= 2020 Belmont Stakes =

American horse race

152nd Belmont Stakes
- Belmont Stakes
- Grade I stakes race
- "The Run for the Carnations"
- Location: Belmont Park; Elmont, New York, U.S.
- Date: June 20, 2020
- Distance: 1 1/8 mi (9 furlongs; 1,811 m)
- Winning horse: Tiz the Law
- Winning time: 1:46.53
- Final odds: 0.80 (to 1)
- Jockey: Manny Franco
- Trainer: Barclay Tagg
- Owner: Sackatoga Stable
- Conditions: Fast
- Surface: Dirt
- Attendance: — (Note: The event was held without a live audience due to the COVID-19 pandemic in the United States.)

The 2020 Belmont Stakes was the 152nd running of the Belmont Stakes and the 109th time the event took place at Belmont Park. It was run June 20, 2020, and was won by Tiz the Law, the first New York-bred winner of the event since Forester in 1882. The race is one of the three legs of the American Triple Crown, open to three-year-old Thoroughbreds.

Due to concerns relating to the ongoing COVID-19 pandemic, the race, which is normally the last Triple Crown race of the season, was run as the first race in the 2020 Triple Crown series and was shortened to 1 1/8 miles (9 furlongs) instead of the usual 1 1/2 miles (12 furlongs), which it had been run at since 1926. This was the first time since 1931 for the Triple Crown races to be run in a different order and the first time for the Belmont Stakes to be run as the opening leg of the Triple Crown.

== Background ==
Since 1969, the American Triple Crown has been scheduled to begin with the Kentucky Derby on the first Saturday in May, followed by the Preakness Stakes two weeks later in mid-May, and the Belmont three weeks after that in early June. Major prep races for the series are normally run from three to six weeks before the Derby. However, the COVID-19 pandemic led to the shutdown of several race meetings starting in mid-March, which led to the postponement or outright cancellation of several of these major preps.

The shutdowns led Churchill Downs to reschedule the 2020 Kentucky Derby to the first Saturday in September. Pimlico followed suit by rescheduling the 2020 Preakness Stakes to the first Saturday in October. The New York Racing Association (NYRA) decided instead to hold the Belmont Stakes on June 20, three weeks after racing in New York reopened on June 3. Because of the disrupted racing schedule, NYRA also decided to shorten the race from its traditional distance of 1 1/2 miles (2.4 km) to 1 1/8 miles (1.8 km). The race thus went from being the longest race of the series, the so-called "test of the champion", to the shortest. NYRA had considered running the race at 1 1/4 miles (2.0 km), but this would have meant starting the race on the clubhouse turn — a serious disadvantage for some horses in a large field. "I think given the circumstances this was the best choice," said trainer Todd Pletcher of the revised distance. "A mile and a half wasn't going to fit many horses at this stage. It was the right move."

The Belmont was the first major sporting event in New York state since the pandemic began. The event was held behind closed doors, with NYRA's online and off-track betting was permitted via the NYRA Bets site and other OTB parlors. Total prize winnings for the race were $1 million, down from $1.5 million the prior year.

== Field ==
After the new date and distance were announced in mid-May, the field was expected to have up to 16 starters. However, Nadal and Charlatan, both leading contenders trained by Bob Baffert, were subsequently injured. This left Tiz the Law as the clear favorite, and connections of several other contenders decided to skip the Belmont to focus on preparing for the Kentucky Derby. "There's other opportunities out there," said owner Barry Irwin of his decision to bypass the race. "Even though it's the Belmont Stakes, it's not the Belmont Stakes. Whatever prestige that would have come from it, that little extra something that makes you run in a race like that is lacking this year. If your goal is to get into the Kentucky Derby, why do you want to get your socks knocked off by Tiz the Law when you can go elsewhere?"

The ten starters were:

- Tap It to Win – allowance race winner
- Sole Volante – won the Sam F. Davis, second in the Tampa Bay Derby
- Max Player – won the Withers Stakes in February, but unraced since then
- Modernist – winner of the Risen Star, third in the Louisiana Derby
- Farmington Road – second in Oaklawn Stakes and fourth in Arkansas Derby
- Fore Left – won the UAE 2000 Guineas in Dubai in February, but unraced since then
- Jungle Runner – winless since November, eighth in the Arkansas Derby
- Tiz the Law – won the Florida Derby and Holy Bull Stakes
- Dr Post – won the Unbridled Stakes
- Pneumatic – third in Matt Winn Stakes

== Results ==
Only essential personnel such as trainers, grooms and a limited number of press were allowed to attend the race – not even the owners were allowed on site. Governor Andrew Cuomo gave the traditional call for "Riders up" remotely. Several sources commented on the eerie silence of the racetrack, with one comparing the experience to filming a movie. "You come out of the tunnel on your horse and there's nobody there," said jockey Manny Franco. "But this is the world we are living in."

Given the shortened distance and the dimensions of Belmont Park, the race started in a chute at the end of the backstretch. Tap It to Win went to the early lead and set a moderate pace. Tiz the Law raced in stalking position a few lengths behind, then launched his move on the turn. He moved by Tap It to Win near the head of the stretch and continued to draw away, winning by 3 3/4 lengths. Dr Post closed ground late to finish second.

Barclay Tagg became the oldest trainer, at age 82, to win the Belmont. Tagg was previously best known as the trainer of 2003 Kentucky Derby winner Funny Cide, who also won the Preakness but failed in his Triple Crown bid by finishing third in that year's Belmont. Both Funny Cide and Tiz the Law are owned by Sackatoga Stable, although the composition of the ownership group has changed over the years. Sackatoga's managing partner Jack Knowlton remarked on how rare it was for such a small operation to have such success. "We buy New York-breds — that's our game — and we don't spend a lot of money. We've been with Barclay Tagg for 25 years, and I keep telling everybody Barclay doesn't get a lot of big horses, big opportunities, but when he does, he knows what to do."

Jockey Manny Franco earned his first win in the Belmont Stakes in his first start in the race. Tiz the Law became the first New-York bred to win the race since Forester in 1882.

Finish	PP	Horse	Jockey	Trainer	Record†	Morning line odds	Final odds	Margin (lengths)	Winnings
1	8	Tiz the Law	Manuel Franco	Barclay Tagg	5–4–0–1	6–5	0.80	—	$535,000
2	9	Dr Post	Irad Ortiz Jr.	Todd Pletcher	3–2–0–0	5–1	7.90	3 3/4	$185,000
3	3	Max Player	Joel Rosario	Linda Rice	3–2–1–0	15–1	14.20	5 1/4	$100,000
4	10	Pneumatic	Ricardo Santana Jr.	Steve Asmussen	3–2–0–1	8–1	17.80	7 3/4	$65,000
5	1	Tap It to Win	John Velazquez	Mark Casse	6–3–1–0	6–1	5.20	14	$40,000
6	2	Sole Volante	Luca Panici	Patrick Biancone	6–4–1–1	9–2	11.20	15 3/4	$30,000
7	4	Modernist	Junior Alvarado	Bill Mott	5–2–0–2	15–1	23.40	20 1/2	$25,000
8	5	Farmington Road	Javier Castellano	Todd Pletcher	6–1–2–0	15–1	17.60	21 1/4	$20,000
9	6	Fore Left	José Ortiz	Doug O'Neill	9–4–0–2	30–1	25.25	22 3/4	—
10	7	Jungle Runner	Reylu Gutierrez	Steve Asmussen	8–2–0–0	50–1	29.50	39 1/4	—

† Starts–Wins–Places–Shows, prior to the Belmont Stakes

Times
Distance	Fractional	Split
1/4 mile	23.11	—
1/2 mile	46.16	23.05
3/4 mile	1:09.94	23.78
1 mile	1:34.46	24.52
Finish	1:46.53	12.07

Track condition: Fast

=== Payouts ===
Based on $2 bet:

Program number	Horse name	Win	Place	Show
8	Tiz the Law	$3.60	$2.90	$2.60
9	Dr Post	–	$5.80	$4.20
3	Max Player	–	–	$5.20

- $1 Exacta: (8–9) $9.80
- $1 Trifecta: (8–9–3) $99.50
- $1 Superfecta: (8–9–3–10) $556.50
