= 2003 in sports =

2003 in sports describes the year's events in world sport.

== Alpine skiing ==
- Alpine Skiing World Cup
  - Men's overall season championship: Stephan Eberharter, Austria
  - Women's overall season championship: Janica Kostelić, Croatia

== American football ==
- Super Bowl XXXVII – the Tampa Bay Buccaneers (NFC) won 48–21 over the Oakland Raiders (AFC)
  - Location: San Diego Stadium
  - Attendance: 67,603
  - MVP: Dexter Jackson, S (Tampa Bay)
- Fiesta Bowl (2002 season):
  - The Ohio State Buckeyes won 31-24 over the Miami Hurricanes (double overtime) to win BCS National Championship
- September 14 – Jamal Lewis sets NFL single game record for rushing yards (295) helping Baltimore Ravens beat Cleveland Browns 33-13.

== Artistic gymnastics ==
- World Artistic Gymnastics Championships –
  - Men's all-around champions: Paul Hamm, US, Yang Wei, China
  - Women's all-around champion: Svetlana Khorkina, Russia
  - Men's team competition champion: China
  - Women's team competition champion: US

== Association football ==
- 2003 Confederations Cup – host nation France wins a tournament marred by tragedy after Cameroon player Marc-Vivien Foé collapsed and died during a semifinal match.
- UEFA Champions League – AC Milan wins 3-2 on penalties over Juventus, after a 0-0 draw at Old Trafford. This was AC Milan’s 6th European Cup.
- UEFA Cup – FC Porto wins 3-2 in the final against Celtic, after extra time, with a silver goal by Derlei. This is Porto’s first UEFA Cup title.
- European Super Cup – AC Milan beats FC Porto 1-0, winning the cup for the fourth time.
- Intercontinental Cup – Boca Juniors win 3-1 on penalties over AC Milan, after a 1-1 draw at the end of extra time. This is Boca Juniors’ third cup.
- Women's World Cup – Germany wins the final against Sweden 2-1 after extra time.

== Athletics ==
- 23–31 August – 2003 World Championships in Athletics held in Paris

== Australian rules football ==
- Australian Football League
  - The Brisbane Lions win the 107th AFL premiership by defeating Collingwood 20.14 (134) to 12.12 (84) in the 2003 AFL Grand Final. The Lions’ win gives them the first premiership “hat-trick” since Melbourne in 1955, 1956 and 1957.
  - Brownlow Medal awarded to Nathan Buckley (Collingwood), Adam Goodes (Sydney Swans) and Mark Ricciuto (Adelaide Crows)
  - Leigh Matthews Trophy awarded to Michael Voss (Brisbane Lions)
- West Australian Football League:
  - August 10: On a rainswept Arena Joondalup, East Perth score only 0.9 (9) against deadly rivals West Perth. It is the first goalless score in WAFL/WANFL/Westar Rules football since West Perth themselves kicked 0.10 (10) against soon-to-be-defunct Midland Junction in May 1916.

== Baseball ==
- April 4 – Sammy Sosa hits his 500th career home run off Cincinnati Reds pitcher Scott Sullivan in the seventh inning at Great American Ball Park, becoming only the eighteenth player in Major League Baseball history to hit 500 or more home runs, as well as the first Hispanic to do so.
- May 5 – Matt Stairs’ home run off Houston Astros pitcher Wade Miller was estimated at 461 feet, making it the longest home run in the history of Minute Maid Park.
- May 11 – Rafael Palmeiro hit his 500th career home run off Cleveland Indians pitcher David Elder becoming only the 19th player in Major League Baseball history to hit 500 or more home runs.
- June 11 – Houston Astro pitcher Roy Oswalt started a no-hitter against the New York Yankees on June 11. Oswalt left after one inning, and five more Astros continued to no-hit the Yankees. Peter Munro pitched 2? innings, Kirk Saarloos pitched 1? innings, Brad Lidge pitched two innings, Octavio Dotel pitched one inning in which he recorded four strikeouts and Billy Wagner pitched a perfect ninth to close out a six-pitcher no-hitter that resulted in 13 strikeouts and an 8-0 victory over the Yankees.
- June 13 – New York Yankee Roger Clemens becomes the 21st pitcher in history to win 300 games and only the 3rd pitcher to record 4,000 career strikeouts as he defeats the St. Louis Cardinals 5-2.
- July 29 – Bill Mueller becomes the only player in major league history to hit two grand slams in a single game from opposite sides of the plate. He in fact hit three home runs in that game, and the two grand slams were in consecutive at-bats.
- 2003 World Series – The Florida Marlins win 4 games to 2 over the New York Yankees.

== Basketball ==
- NBA Finals – The San Antonio Spurs win their second NBA title, defeating the New Jersey Nets 4 games to 2. Tim Duncan, who nearly scores a quadruple-double in the deciding Game 6, is named Finals MVP.
- NCAA Men's Basketball Championship –
  - Syracuse Orange win 81-78 over the Kansas Jayhawks
- December 13 – The largest crowd in the sport's history, 78,129, packed Ford Field in Detroit to watch Michigan State and Kentucky. Kentucky wins 79-74.*
- NCAA Women's Basketball Championship –
  - UConn Huskies win 73-68 over the Tennessee Lady Vols
- WNBA Finals – Detroit Shock win 2 games to 1 over the Los Angeles Sparks, winning the franchise's first title, and marking the first time an Eastern conference team is WNBA world champions.
- Chinese Basketball Association finals: Bayi Rockets defeat Guangdong Southern Tigers, 3 games to 1.
- National Basketball League (Australia) Finals: Sydney Kings defeated the Perth Wildcats 2-0 in best-of-three final series.

== Boxing ==
- May 9 to May 18 – African Amateur Boxing Championships held in Yaoundé, Cameroon
- July 6 to July 13 – World Amateur Boxing Championships held in Bangkok
- August 8 to August 15 – Pan American Games held in Santo Domingo, Dominican Republic
- September 13 – Shane Mosley conquers the WBA and WBC world Jr. Middleweight titles with a 12-round unanimous decision over Oscar De La Hoya in rematch of their 2000 bout
- October 4 to October 13 – All-Africa Games held in Abuja, Nigeria

== Canadian football ==
- February 27 – Darren Flutie retires
- November 16 – the Edmonton Eskimos win the 91st Grey Cup game, defeating the Montreal Alouettes 34–22 at Mosaic Stadium in Regina.
- November 22 – Université Laval win the Vanier Cup, defeating St. Mary's University 14–7.

== Cricket ==
- The Ashes – Australia defeats England 4-1
- May – West Indies defeats Australia by scoring a world record 418 runs in the fourth innings
- 2003 Cricket World Cup – Australia defeats India in the final by 125 runs
- Domestic competitions
  - County Championship (England and Wales) – Sussex CCC
  - Sheffield Shield (Australia) – New South Wales
  - First Twenty20 Cup series held in England and won by Surrey CCC

== Curling ==
- 2003 Ford World Curling Championship
  - Women's Final: (April 12) United States (Debbie McCormick) 5-3 Canada (Colleen Jones)
  - Men's Final: (April 13) Canada (Randy Ferbey) 10-6 Switzerland (Ralph Stöckli)

== Cycle racing ==
Road bicycle racing

- Giro d'Italia won by Gilberto Simoni of Italy
- Tour de France – Lance Armstrong (Rescinded)
- 2003 UCI Road World Championships – Men's road race – Igor Astarloa of Spain

Cyclo-cross

- UCI Cyclo-cross World Championships
  - men's competition won by Bart Wellens
  - women's competition won by Daphny van den Brand

== Dogsled racing ==
- Iditarod Trail Sled Dog Race Champion
  - Robert Sørlie wins will lead dog: Tipp

== Field hockey ==
- Men's Champions Trophy: Netherlands
- Women's Champions Trophy: Australia

== Figure skating ==
- World Figure Skating Championships –
  - Men's champion: Evgeni Plushenko, Russia
  - Ladies’ champion: Michelle Kwan, United States
  - Pair skating champions: Shen Xue and Zhao Hongbo, China
  - Ice dancing champions: Shae-Lynn Bourne and Victor Kraatz, Canada

== Floorball ==
- Women's World Floorball Championships
  - Champion: Sweden
- Men's under-19 World Floorball Championships
  - Champion: Finland
- European Cup
  - Men's champion: Haninge IBK
  - Women's champion: Balrog IK

== Gaelic Athletic Association ==
- Camogie
  - All-Ireland Camogie Champion: Tipperary
  - National Camogie League: Cork
- Gaelic football
  - All-Ireland Senior Football Championship – Tyrone 0-12 defeated Armagh 0-9
  - National Football League – Tyrone 0-21 defeated Laois 1-8
- Ladies' Gaelic football
  - All-Ireland Senior Football Champion: Mayo
  - National Football League: Laois
- Hurling
  - All-Ireland Senior Hurling Championship – Kilkenny 1-14 died Cork 1-11
  - National Hurling League – Kilkenny 5–14 beat Tipperary 5–13

== Gliding ==
- World Gliding Championships, Leszno, Poland
  - Open Class Winner: Holger Karow, Germany; Glider: Schempp-Hirth Nimbus-4
  - 18-metre Class Winner: Wolfgang Janowitsch, Austria; Glider: Schempp-Hirth Ventus-2
  - 15-metre Class Winner: John Coutts, New Zealand; Glider: Alexander Schleicher ASW 27
  - Standard Class Winner: Andrew Davis, UK; Glider: Schempp-Hirth Discus 2
- World Gliding Championships, Nitra, Slovakia
  - World Class Winner: Sebastian Kawa, Poland; Glider: PZL PW-5

== Golf ==
Men's professional

- Major championship results:
  - Masters Tournament – Mike Weir becomes the first Canadian and the first left-handed golfer to win The Masters. He defeats Len Mattiace on the first playoff hole.
  - U.S. Open – Jim Furyk. Tournament takes place at Olympia Fields, and Furyk wins his first major by 3 shots.
  - British Open – Ben Curtis, an outsider, wins by a single shot from Thomas Björn and Vijay Singh at Royal St. George's.
  - PGA Championship – Shaun Micheel, another outside, wins by 2 shots at Oak Hill Country Club.

Men's amateur

- British Amateur – Gary Wolstenholme
- U.S. Amateur – Nick Flanagan
- European Amateur – Brian McElhinney

Women's professional

- Major results:
  - Kraft Nabisco Championship – Patricia Meunier-Lebouc
  - U.S. Women's Open – Hilary Lunke wins an 18-hole playoff over Angela Stanford and Kelly Robbins.
  - LPGA Championship – Annika Sörenstam
  - Women's British Open – Annika Sörenstam
- September 12–14 – 2003 Solheim Cup – Team Europe win back the cup from Team United States 17½ to 10½ points.

== Handball ==
- 2003 World Men's Handball Championship played in Portugal
  - Gold medal: Croatia
  - Silver medal: Germany
  - Bronze medal: France

== Harness racing ==
- North America Cup – Yankee Cruiser
- United States Pacing Triple Crown races –
  1. Cane Pace – No Pan Intended
  2. Little Brown Jug – No Pan Intended
  3. Messenger Stakes – No Pan Intended
- United States Trotting Triple Crown races –
  1. Hambletonian – Amigo Hall
  2. Yonkers Trot – Sugar Trader
  3. Kentucky Futurity – Mr. Muscleman
- Australian Inter Dominion Harness Racing Championship –
  - Pacers: Baltic Eagle
  - Trotters: Take A Moment

== Horse racing ==
Steeplechases

- Cheltenham Gold Cup – Best Mate
- Grand National – Monty's Pass

Hurdle races

- Champion Hurdle – Rooster Booster

Flat races

- Australia – Melbourne Cup won by Makybe Diva
- Canadian Triple Crown Races:
  1. Queen's Plate won by Wando
  2. Prince of Wales Stakes won by Wando
  3. Breeders' Stakes won by Wando
  - Wando becomes the seventh horse to win the Canadian Triple Crown.
- Dubai – Dubai World Cup won by Moon Ballad
- France – Prix de l'Arc de Triomphe won by Dalakhani
- Ireland – Irish Derby Stakes won by Alamshar
- Japan – Japan Cup won by Tap Dance City
- English Triple Crown Races:
  1. 2,000 Guineas Stakes – Refuse To Bend
  2. The Derby – Kris Kin
  3. St. Leger Stakes – Brian Boru
- United States Triple Crown Races:
  1. Kentucky Derby won by Funny Cide
  2. Preakness Stakes won by Funny Cide
  3. Belmont Stakes won by Empire Maker
- Breeders' Cup World Thoroughbred Championships:
  1. Breeders' Cup Classic – Pleasantly Perfect
  2. Breeders’ Cup Distaff – Adoration
  3. Breeders' Cup Filly & Mare Turf – Islington
  4. Breeders' Cup Juvenile – Action This Day
  5. Breeders' Cup Juvenile Fillies – Halfbridled
  6. Breeders' Cup Mile – Six Perfections
  7. Breeders' Cup Sprint – Cajun Beat
  8. Breeders' Cup Turf – High Chaparral and Johar dead-heated

== Ice hockey ==
- Art Ross Trophy as the NHL’s leading scorer during the regular season: Peter Forsberg, Colorado Avalanche.
- Hart Memorial Trophy for the NHL’s Most Valuable Player: Peter Forsberg, Colorado Avalanche.
- Stanley Cup – New Jersey Devils win 4 games to 3 over the Mighty Ducks of Anaheim. The Conn Smythe Trophy as the playoffs MVP is won by Jean-Sébastien Giguère of Anaheim.
- World Hockey Championship
  - Men’s champion: Canada defeats Sweden 3-2.
  - Junior Men’s champion: Russia win 3-2 over Canada.
  - Women’s champion: tournament scheduled for Beijing, China cancelled due to the outbreak of SARS.
- 2003 Memorial Cup
  - Final: Kitchener Rangers 6-3 Hull Olympiques.

== Lacrosse ==
- Victoria Shamrocks win the Mann Cup.
- St. Catharines Athletics win the Minto Cup
- In May, Canada wins the first World Indoor Lacrosse Championship, defeating the Iroquois Nation in the final by a score of 21-4.
- The Toronto Rock win the Champion's Cup over the Rochester Knighthawks.
- The Long Island Lizards win the Steinfeld Cup over the Baltimore Bayhawks.
- Amherst College Women’s Lacrosse team defeats Middlebury College to win the Division III National Championship, 11-9.

== Mixed martial arts ==
The following is a list of major noteworthy MMA events during 2003 in chronological order.

| Date | Event | Alternate Name/s | Location | Attendance | PPV Buyrate | Notes |
| February 28 | UFC 41: Onslaught | —N/a | (United States) Atlantic City, New Jersey, US | 13,401 | 60,000 | This event marked the return of Tank Abbott to the UFC. This was Abbott's first fight since October 1998. |
| March 16 | Pride 25: Body Blow | —N/a | Yokohama, Japan | —N/a | —N/a | —N/a |
| March 27 | WEC 6: Return of a Legend | —N/a | (United States) Lemoore, California, US | —N/a | —N/a | This event is noted for the return of Frank Shamrock in his first fight since retiring. Shamrock had not fought since December 2000. |
| April 25 | UFC 42: Sudden Impact | —N/a | (United States) Miami, Florida, US | 6,700 | 35,000 | —N/a |
| June 6 | UFC 43: Meltdown | —N/a | (United States) Paradise, Nevada, US | 9,800 | 49,000 | UFC rule change, in the event of a stoppage fights restart in the position the fight was stopped. |
| June 8 | Pride 26: Bad to the Bone | Pride 26: Reborn | Yokohama, Japan | —N/a | —N/a | —N/a |
| August 10 | Pride Total Elimination 2003 | —N/a | Saitama, Japan | 40,316 | —N/a | Quarterfinals to Pride GP 2003 middleweight tournament. |
| September 26 | UFC 44: Undisputed | —N/a | (United States) Las Vegas, Nevada, US | 10,400 | 94,000 | —N/a |
| October 5 | Pride Bushido 1 | —N/a | Saitama, Japan | —N/a | —N/a | —N/a |
| October 10 | Rumble on the Rock 4 | —N/a | (United States) Honolulu, Hawaii, US | —N/a | —N/a | —N/a |
| November 9 | Pride Final Conflict 2003 | —N/a | Tokyo, Japan | 67,450 | —N/a | Present record holder for the highest attendance of a strictly MMA event. Semifinals and final to Pride GP 2003 middleweight tournament. Wanderlei Silva becomes the Pride 2003 middleweight Grand Prix champion. |
| November 21 | UFC 45: Revolution | —N/a | (United States) Uncasville, Connecticut, US | 9,200 | 40,000 | —N/a |
| December 31 | Pride Shockwave 2003 | —N/a | Saitama, Japan | 39,716 | —N/a | Gary Goodridge announced he would retire from Pride FC at this event. |
| December 31 | K-1 PREMIUM 2003 Dynamite!! | —N/a | Nagoya, Japan | 43,560 | —N/a | Event featured six K-1 MMA bouts and four K-1 kickboxing bouts. |

== Radiosport ==
- Fifth High Speed Telegraphy World Championship held in Minsk, Belarus.

== Rugby league ==
- 2003 NRL grand final - won by the Penrith Panthers.
- 2003 Kangaroo tour took place in the post season with Australia winning The Ashes
- 2003 Challenge Cup - won by the Bradford Bulls
- 2003 World Club Challenge - won by the Sydney Roosters
- 2003 Super League Grand Final - won by the Bradford Bulls
- 2003 State of Origin series - won by New South Wales

== Rugby union ==
- 109th Six Nations Championship series is won by England who complete the Grand Slam
- Bledisloe Cup – New Zealand All Blacks defeats the Wallabies 2 matches to 0 in a two-match series
- Heineken Cup – Toulouse defeats Perpignan 22–17
- Rugby World Cup – England defeats Australia 20–17 after extra time
- Tri Nations Series – New Zealand

== Show jumping ==
- Marcus Ehning of Germany wins the Show Jumping World Cup riding his Oldenburg mare, Anka

== Snooker ==
- World Snooker Championship – Mark Williams beats Ken Doherty 18-16
- World rankings – Mark Williams becomes world number one for 2003/04

== Swimming ==
- July – 10th World LC Championships held at Barcelona
- August – Swimming at the 2003 Pan American Games, held at Santo Domingo, Dominican Republic
- December – 7th European SC Championships 2003, held at Dublin
  - Germany wins the most medals (21); Germany and Great Britain win the most gold medals (7)

== Tennis ==
- Grand Slam in tennis men's results:
  - Australian Open – Andre Agassi defeats Rainer Schüttler, 6-2, 6-2, 6-1.
  - French Open – Juan Carlos Ferrero defeats Martin Verkerk, 6-1, 6-3, 6-2.
  - Wimbledon championships – Roger Federer defeats Mark Philippoussis, 7-6, 6-2, 7-6.
  - U.S. Open – Andy Roddick defeats Juan Carlos Ferrero, 6-3, 7-6, 6-3.
- Grand Slam in tennis women's results:
  - Australian Open – Serena Williams defeats Venus Williams, 7-6, 3-6, 6-4.
  - French Open – Justine Henin-Hardenne defeats Kim Clijsters, 6-0, 6-4.
  - Wimbledon championships – Serena Williams defeats Venus Williams, 4-6, 6-4, 6-2.
  - U.S. Open – Justine Henin-Hardenne defeats Kim Clijsters, 7-5, 6-1.
- Pete Sampras retires, aged 32 on August 25

== Volleyball ==
- Men's World League: Brazil
- Women's World Grand Prix: China
- 2003 FIVB Men's World Cup: Brazil
- 2003 FIVB Women's World Cup: China
- 2003 Men's European Volleyball Championship: Italy
- 2003 Women's European Volleyball Championship: Poland

== Water polo ==
- 2003 FINA Men's World Water Polo Championship: Hungary
- 2003 FINA Men's Water Polo World League: Hungary
- 2003 Men's European Water Polo Championship: Yugoslavia
- 2003 FINA Women's World Water Polo Championship: USA
- 2003 Women's European Water Polo Championship: Italy

== Weightlifting ==
- World Championships held in Vancouver, British Columbia, Canada

== Yacht racing ==
- Switzerland becomes the first landlocked country to win the America's Cup as Alinghi, from the Société Nautique de Genève, beats defender Team New Zealand, of the Royal New Zealand Yacht Squadron, 5 races to 0

== Multi-sport events ==
- 14th Pan American Games held in Santo Domingo, Dominican Republic
  - United States tops the medal table with a total number of 270 medals, including 117 golds.
- 8th All-Africa Games held in Abuja, Nigeria
  - Egypt tops the medal table with a total number of 214 medals, including 80 golds.
- Fifth Winter Asian Games held in Aomori, Japan
  - Japan tops the medal table with a total number of 67 medals, including 24 golds.
- First Afro–Asian Games held in Hyderabad, India
  - China tops the medal table with a total number of 41 medals, including 25 golds.
- XXII Summer Universiade held in Daegu, South Korea
  - China tops the medal table with a total number of 80 medals, including 41 golds.
- 21st Winter Universiade held in Tarvisio, Italy
  - Russia tops the medal table with a total number of 31 medals, including 11 golds.
- 12th South Pacific Games held in Suva, Fiji

== Awards ==
- Associated Press Male Athlete of the Year – Lance Armstrong, Cycling
- Associated Press Female Athlete of the Year – Annika Sörenstam, LPGA golf
