= Florida Derby top three finishers =

This is a listing of the horses that finished in either first, second, or third place and the number of starters in the Florida Derby, an American Grade 1 race for three-year-olds at 1-1/8 miles on the dirt held at Gulfstream Park in Hallandale Beach, Florida. (List from 1971-present)

Year	Winner	Second	Third	Starters
2025	Tappan Street	Sovereignty	Neoequos	10
2024	Fierceness	Catalytic	Grand Mo The First	8
2023	Forte	Mage	Cyclone Mischief	12
2022	White Abbario	Charge It	Simplification	11
2021	Known Agenda	Soup and Sandwich	Greatest Honour	11
2020	Tiz the Law	Shivaree	Ete Indien	9
2019	Maximum Security	Bodexpress	Code of Honor	11
2018	Audible	Hofburg	Mississippi	9
2017	Always Dreaming	State of Honor	Gunnevera	10
2016	Nyquist	Majesto	Fellowship	8
2015	Materiality	Upstart	Flatter	9
2014	Constitution	Wildcat Red	General a Rod	8
2013	Orb	Itsmyluckyday	Merit Man	10
2012	Take Charge Indy	Reveron	Union Rags	9
2011	Dialed In	Shackleford	To Honor and Serve	8
2010	Ice Box	Pleasant Prince	Rule	11
2009	Quality Road	Dunkirk	Theregoesjojo	7
2008	Big Brown	Smooth Air	Tomcito	12
2007	Scat Daddy	Notional	Chelokee	9
2006	Barbaro	Sharp Humor	Sunriver	11
2005	High Fly	Noble Causeway	B. B. Best	9
2004	Friends Lake	Value Plus	The Cliff's Edge	10
2003	Empire Maker	Trust N Luck	Indy Dancer	7
2002	Harlan's Holiday	Blue Burner	Peekskill	11
2001	Monarchos	Outofthebox	Invisible Ink	13
2000	Hal's Hope	High Yield	Takodha Hills	10
1999	Vicar	Wondertross	Cat Thief	10
1998	Cape Town	Lil's Lad	Halory Hunter	6
1997	Captain Bodgit	Pulpit	Frisk Me Now	8
1996	Unbridled's Song	Editor's Note	Skip Away	9
1995	Thunder Gulch	Suave Prospect	Mecke	10
1994	Holy Bull	Ride the Rails	Halo's Image	14
1993	Bull in the Heather	Storm Tower	Wallenda	13
1992	Technology	Dance Floor	Pistols and Roses	12
1991	Fly So Free	Strike the Gold	Hansel	8
1990	Unbridled	Slavic	Run Turn	9
1989	Mercedes Won	Western Playboy	Big Stanley	11
1988	Brian's Time	Forty Niner	Notebook	10
1987	Cryptoclearance	No More Flowers	Talinum	9
1986	Snow Chief	Badger Land	Mogambo	16
1985	Proud Truth	Irish Slur	Do It Again Dan	11
1984	Swale	Dr. Carter	Darn That Alarm	9
1983	Croeso	Copelan	Law Talk	13
1982	Timely Writer	Star Gallant	Our Escapade	7
1981	Lord Avie	Akureyri	Linnleur	11
1980	Plugged Nickle	Naked Sky	Lord Gallant	8
1979	Spectacular Bid	Lot o' Gold	Fantasy 'n Reality	7
1978	Alydar	Believe It	Dr. Valeri	7
1977	Coined Silver	Nearly On Time	Fort Prevel	8
1977	Ruthie's Native	For The Moment	Sir Sir	10
1976	Honest Pleasure	Great Contractor	Proud Birdie	6
1975	Prince Thou Art	Sylvan Place	Foolish Pleasure	9
1974	Judger	Cannonade	Buck's Bid	16
1973	Royal and Regal	Forego	Restless Jet	8
1972	Upper Case	No Le Hace	Gentle Smoke	11
1971	Eastern Fleet	Executioner	Jim French	11
