= Kings Point Handicap =

- Class: Restricted stakes
- Location: Aqueduct Racetrack; Jamaica, Queens, New York, United States
- Inaugurated: 1981
- Race type: Thoroughbred – Flat racing
- Website: www.nyra.com/aqueduct/Stakes/KingsPoint.shtml

Race information
- Distance: 1 1/8 miles (9 furlongs)
- Surface: Dirt
- Track: left-handed
- Qualification: Three-years-old & up
- Weight: Assigned
- Purse: US$100,000

The Kings Point Handicap is an American Thoroughbred horse race held annually during the latter part of March (or February) at Aqueduct Racetrack in Jamaica, New York. Open to horses age three and older bred in the State of New York, it is contested on dirt over a distance of one and one eighth miles (9 furlongs).

Inaugurated in 1981, the race is named for the village of Kings Point, New York on the north shore of Long Island, New York which is home to the U.S. Merchant Marine Academy.

The Kings Point Handicap was run at a mile and seventy yards from 1981 to 1987, and from 1989 to 1995. In 1988 it was run at one mile.

The race was run in two divisions in 2002.

In 2006, Kentucky Derby, Preakness Stakes and Jockey Club Gold Cup winner, Funny Cide won this race.

== Records ==
Most wins:

- 3 – Smart Coupons (1998, 1999, 2000)

Most wins by a jockey:

- 3 – Ángel Cordero Jr. (1981, 1983, 1984)
- 3 – John Velazquez (1994, 2001, 2004)

Most wins by a trainer:

- 3 – Deborah S. Bodner (1998, 1999, 2000)

Most wins by an owner:

- 2 – Arthur Wendel (1987, 1988)
- 2 – Louis J. Porreco (1999, 2000)
- 2 – Edwin H. Wachtel (2000) (2×)

== Winners ==
Year	Winner	Age	Jockey	Trainer	Owner	Time
2014	Zivo	5	Abel Castellano Jr.	Chad C. Brown	Thomas Coleman	1:46.66
2013						
2012						
2011	Inherit the Gold	5	Eddie Castro	James Hooper	Glas-Tipp Stable & Hooper	1:50.99
2010	Icabad Crane	5	Gabriel Saez	H. Graham Motion	Earle I. Mack	1:50.65
2009	Wishful Tomcat	4	Ramon Domínguez	Richard E. Dutrow Jr.	IEAH stables	1:48.96
2008	R Clear Victory	5	Stewart Elliott	Steve Asmussen	Coastal Racing Stable	1:50.25
2007	Accountforthegold	5	Mike Luzzi	Gary C. Contessa	Winning Move Stable	1:48.41
2006	Funny Cide	6	Richard Migliore	Barclay Tagg	Sackatoga Stable	1:50.47
2005	Chowder's First	4	Joe Bravo	Philip Serpe	Inniscarra Stable, Inc.	1:51.44
2004	Gander	8	John Velazquez	John Terranova	Gatsas Stable	1:52.31
2003	Lord of the Thunder	4	Javier Castellano	Jennifer Pedersen	Paraneck Stable	1:49.47
2002	Mount Intrepid	5	Norberto Arroyo Jr.	Howard M. Tesher	Edwin H. Wachtel	1:51.92
2002	Compelling World	4	Shaun Bridgmohan	John DeStefano Jr.	Edwin H. Wachtel	1:52.27
2001	Toddler	4	John Velazquez	Richard Dutrow Jr.	Gabrielle Farm	1:50.10
2000	Smart Coupons	7	Cornelio Velásquez	Deborah S. Bodner	Louis J. Porreco	1:49.79
1999	Smart Coupons	6	René Douglas	Deborah S. Bodner	Louis J. Porreco	1:50.40
1998	Smart Coupons	5	Chuck C. Lopez	Deborah S. Bodner	Dee-Pee Stable	1:49.60
1997	Ormsby	5	Chuck C. Lopez	Sue Alpers	Woodside Stud	1:47.60
1996	Patsyprospect	5	Jorge F. Chavez	H. Allen Jerkens	Black Marlin Stable	1:47.20
1995	More to Tell	4	Frank Alvarado	Gasper Moschera	Barbara J. Davis	1:43.20
1994	Double Calvados	4	John Velazquez	Susan A. Duncan	Susan L. Fackler	1:46.00
1993	Fabersham	5	Mike E. Smith	Gasper S. Moschera	Moses Eichenbaum	1:46.20
1992	Packett's Landing	6	Julio Pezua	Dennis J. Brida	Michael Watral	1:45.40
1991	G'Day Mate	8	Herb McCauley	Peter Ferriola	James Riccio	1:42.40
1990	Packett's Landing	4	Jorge Velásquez	Reginald S. Vardon	Sam F. Morrell	1:44.40
1989	Whodam	4	Chris Antley	Dan C. Peitz	Arrow Head Stables	1:46.20
1988	Landing Plot	5	José A. Santos	Arther Wendel	Arthur Wendel	1:37.20
1987	Landing Plot	4	José A. Santos	Arthur Wendel	Arthur Wendel	1:44.00
1986	Ask Mikey	5	Jorge Velásquez	Oscar S. Barrera	Oscar S. Barrera	1:46.60
1985	Talc Duster	4	Kenneth Skinner	Thomas Gullo	James F. Edwards	1:44.40
1984	Jacque's Tip	4	Ángel Cordero Jr.	John Parisella	Theodore M. Sabarese	1:43.60
1983	Master Digby	4	Ángel Cordero Jr.	Howard M. Tesher	Jerome Brody	1:41.20
1982	Accipiter's Hope	4	Nick Santagata	Stephen L. DiMauro	Harold I. Snyder	1:41.20
1981	Kim's Chance	5	Ángel Cordero Jr.	Steven T. Jerkens	Rodger E. Leslie	1:42.00
