= 2003 Preakness Stakes =

128th running of the Preakness Stakes

128th Preakness Stakes
- The Preakness Stakes
- "The Middle Jewel of the Triple Crown" "The Run for the Black-Eyed Susans"
- Location: Pimlico Race Course, Baltimore, Maryland, United States
- Date: May 17, 2003
- Winning horse: Funny Cide
- Winning time: 1:55.61
- Final odds: 1.9-1
- Jockey: José A. Santos
- Trainer: Barclay Tagg
- Conditions: Fast
- Surface: Dirt
- Attendance: 109,931

The 2003 Preakness Stakes was the 128th running of the Preakness Stakes thoroughbred horse race. The race took place on May 17, 2003, and was televised in the United States on the NBC television network. Funny Cide, who was jockeyed by José A. Santos, won the race by nine and three quarter lengths over runner-up Midway Road. Approximate post time was 6:14 p.m. Eastern Time. The race was run over a track listed as good in a final time of 1:55.61. The Maryland Jockey Club reported total attendance of 109,931, this is recorded as second highest on the list of American thoroughbred racing top attended events for North America in 2003.

== Payout ==
The 128th Preakness Stakes Payout Schedule

Program Number	Horse Name	Win	Place	Show
9	Funny Cide	$ 5.80	$4.60	$3.40
6	Midway Road	-	$15.40	$9.00
1	Scrimshaw	-	-	$4.00

- $2 Exacta: (9–6) paid $120.60
- $2 Trifecta: (9–6–1) paid $684.20
- $1 Superfecta: (9–6–1–7) $792.20

== The full chart ==
Finish Position	Margin (lengths)	Post Position	Horse name	Jockey	Trainer	Owner	Post Time Odds	Purse Earnings
1st	0	9	Funny Cide	José A. Santos	Barclay Tagg	Sackatoga Stable	1.90-1 favorite	$650,000
2nd	9 3/4	6	Midway Road	Robby Albarado	Neil J. Howard	William S. Farish	20.00-1	$200,000
3rd	10 1/2	1	Scrimshaw	Gary Stevens	D. Wayne Lukas	Robert B. Lewis	4.90-1	$100,000
4th	10 1/2	7	Peace Rules	Edgar Prado	Robert J. Frankel	Edmund A. Gann	2.40-1	$50,000
5th	12 1/2	1A	Senor Swinger	Pat Day	Bob Baffert	Robert B. Lewis	4.90-1	
6th	12 3/4	8	New York Hero	Jorge F. Chavez	Jennifer Pederson	Paraneck Stable	19.60-1	
7th	15	3	Foufa's Warrior	Ramon A. Dominguez	Lawrence E. Murray	Sondra D. Bender	22.40-1	
8th	16 1/4	2	Cherokee's Boy	Ryan Fogelsonger	Gary Capuano	Z W P Stable	9.70-1	
9th	22	5	Ten Cents A Shine	Jerry Bailey	D. Wayne Lukas	Kenneth and Sarah Ramsey	8.50-1	
10th	23	4	Kissin Saint	Richard Migliore	Lisa L. Lewis	P. Karches & M. Rankowitz	10.20-1	

- Winning Breeder: WinStar Farm; (NY)
- Final Time: 1:55.61
- Track Condition: Fast
- Total Attendance: 109,931

== See also ==
- 2003 Kentucky Derby
- 2003 Belmont Stakes
