= 1882 Belmont Stakes =

American horse race

16th Belmont Stakes
- Belmont Stakes
- Location: Jerome Park Racetrack
- Date: June 8, 1882
- Distance: 1 1/2 mi (12 furlongs; 2.4 km)
- Winning horse: Forester
- Winning time: 2:43
- Final odds: 0.20
- Jockey: Jim McLaughlin
- Owner: Appleby & Johnson
- Conditions: Fast
- Surface: Dirt

The 1882 Belmont Stakes was the 16th running of the Belmont Stakes. It was held on June 8, 1882, at Jerome Park Racetrack in Fordham, Bronx, New York City.

In a field of three horses, Forester, the favorite ridden by Jim McLaughlin, won the event by five lengths over second place Babcock. For winning, Forester's owners received $2,600.

Bred by August Belmont, Forester was the last New York-bred horse to win the Belmont Stakes before Tiz the Law won the 2020 Belmont Stakes.

== Results ==
Finish	Horse	Jockey	Owner	Odds	Win
1	Forester	Jim McLaughlin	Appleby & Johnson	0.20	$2,600
2	Babcock	Kelso	W. Lakeland	12.00	
3	Wyoming	Feakes	P. Lorillard	6.00	
