= Sackatoga Stable =

Thoroughbred racehorse racing and breeding operation

Coordinates: 43.0816°N 73.7876°W

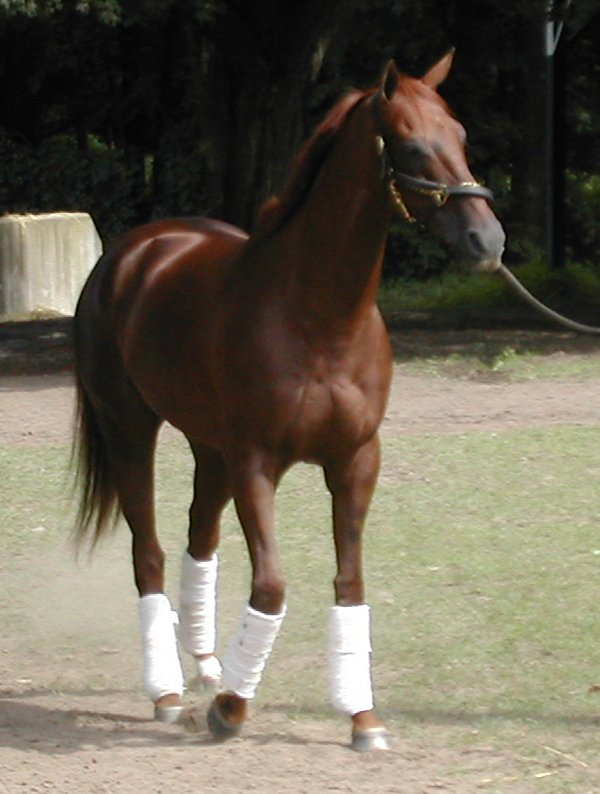
Sackatoga Stable's champion, Funny Cide

Sackatoga Stable is an American Thoroughbred horse racing syndicate in Saratoga Springs, New York. They are best known as the owners of 2003 Kentucky Derby and Preakness winner Funny Cide and 2020 Belmont Stakes and Travers Stakes winner Tiz the Law.

The stable is an ownership syndicate where the public can buy minor ownership shares in thoroughbred horses. The name Sackatoga is a portmanteau of Sackets Harbor and Saratoga Springs; Sackets Harbor for the original hometown of Operating Manager, Jack Knowlton, and Saratoga Springs for his current hometown and location of Sackatoga Stable's home office.

Initially a partnership with Jack Knowlton as a managing partner since 1995, Sackatoga Stables became an LLC in 2006, now led by Jack Knowlton and Ed Mitzen, with Everard and Tagg also involved. The stable now creates ownership syndicates which have owned and raced many horses over the years, focusing on races with value-added purses for New York-bred horses.

The stable works with horse trainer Barclay Tagg and his team. They usually purchase yearlings and two-year-olds in training which are shipped to New Episode Training Center in Ocala, Florida owned by Tony Everard. At New Episode, they obtain their initial training and then go to Tagg for race competition.

Sackatoga Stable participates with Thoroughbred Owners and Breeders Association (TOBA), i.e., thoroughbred owners & breeders, professionals, and others who support and promote Thoroughbred ownership (and sponsorship), such as through networking and a high level of education.

== Horses ==
Sackatoga Stable are notable on focusing New York State bred horses.

"Funny Cide has the heart of a champion. This horse is all heart." (from 'Starter Analysis')

— Steve Fugitte

Funny Cide, winner of the 2003 Kentucky Derby and Preakness and third in the Belmont, was purchased after Knowlton asked Tagg to "find them a good horse." Tagg recommended Funny Cide, as Tagg had seen then-owner Tony Everard buy the colt for $50,000 at a 2001 sale. Tagg had wanted to buy the colt, but he had not found a client who would meet Everard's asking price.

After a mare owned by Sackatoga, Bail Money, was claimed for $62,500 at Gulfstream Park, the consortium was able to swing the price. Tagg then purchased the gelding for $75,000 in a private transaction in March, 2002.

Following Funny Cide's win, the stable owned and raced a significant number of other horses, primarily in New York.

In 2020, Sackatoga returned to the Triple Crown series with 2020 Belmont Stakes winner Tiz the Law, who became the first New York-bred to win the Belmont since Forester in 1882.
