= Tiz the Law =

American thoroughbred racehorse

- Sire: Constitution
- Grandsire: Tapit
- Dam: Tizfiz
- Damsire: Tiznow
- Sex: Stallion
- Foaled: March 19, 2017 (age 9)
- Country: USA
- Colour: Bay
- Breeder: Twin Creeks Farm
- Owner: Sackatoga Stable
- Trainer: Barclay Tagg
- Record: 9: 6–1–1
- Earnings: $2,615,300

Major wins
- Champagne Stakes (2019); Holy Bull Stakes (2020); Florida Derby (2020); Travers Stakes (2020); U.S. Triple Crown series: Belmont Stakes (2020)

Honors
- New York bred Champion Two-Year-Old Male Horse (2019); New York bred Champion Three-Year-Old Male Horse (2020); New York bred Horse of the Year (2019, 2020)
- Last updated on September 5, 2020

Tiz the Law (foaled March 19, 2017) is an American Thoroughbred racehorse who won the 2020 Belmont Stakes and Travers Stakes. He was the first New York-bred horse to win the Belmont since Forester in 1882. He also won the 2019 Champagne Stakes and 2020 Florida Derby, and came second in the 2020 Kentucky Derby.

== Background ==
Tiz the Law is a bay horse with a broad white blaze, bred in New York state by Twin Creeks Farm. As a yearling in 2018 he was consigned to the Fasig-Tipton Saratoga Sale and was bought for $110,000 by Jack Knowlton. Knowlton is a founder of Sackatoga Stable, and formed a syndicate of 35 partners who race the colt under Sackatoga colors. The colt was sent into training with Barclay Tagg, who had previously handled Sackatoga's 2003 Kentucky Derby winner Funny Cide.

Tiz the Law is from the first crop of foals by Constitution, a Kentucky-bred stallion whose wins included the Florida Derby and the Donn Handicap. Tiz the Law's dam Tizfiz, a daughter of Tiznow, was a successful racemare who included the Grade II San Gorgonio Handicap among her seven track victories. Her grand-dam Crafty And Evil was a half-sister to Favorite Trick.

== Racing career ==
=== 2019: two-year-old season ===
Tiz the Law's first race was on August 8, 2019, at Saratoga in a maiden special weight race for New York-bred two-year-olds. He rated in fourth place behind a fast early pace then swung to the outside as the turned into the stretch. He quickly went to the lead and continued to widen his margin down the stretch, winning by 4 1/4 lengths while under a hold.

Tiz the Law made his second start on October 5 at Belmont Park where Tagg stepped him sharply up in class by entering him in the 2019 Grade 1 Champagne Stakes, New York's most important race for two-year-old colts. The favorite in the field of six was Green Light Go, winner of the Saratoga Special, who went to the early lead. Tiz the Law stumbled at the start then settled at the back of the pack. He started his move on the turn but briefly ran into traffic. When he finally found racing room, Tiz the Law quickly took command of the race and drew off to win by four lengths.

Although the win gave the colt a free entry into the Breeders' Cup Juvenile four weeks later, Tagg opted to miss the race, commenting, "It's a little close, and I think it will be pushing him". He instead finished out his 2019 season in the Kentucky Jockey Club Stakes on November 30 at Churchill Downs. Over a sloppy track, Tiz the Law was close to the early pace but became trapped in a pocket and did not respond quickly enough when he finally got racing room. finishing a close third.

Due to his win at the 2019 Champagne Stakes, Tiz the Law was the early favorite on the 2020 Road to the Kentucky Derby.

=== 2020: three-year-old season ===
Tiz the Law began his 2020 season on February 1 with a win in the Grade III Holy Bull Stakes at Gulfstream Park in Florida. On March 28, he easily won the Grade I Florida Derby at the same track. By that time though, Florida was one of the few racing jurisdictions not to be closed down by the COVID-19 pandemic. Kentucky, Maryland and New York had all put racing on hold, which meant that the Triple Crown races held in those states would need to be rescheduled. Churchill Downs had already announced that the 2020 Kentucky Derby, normally held on the first Saturday in May, would instead be held on the first Saturday in September. Tiz the Law's connections decided to give the colt a break while waiting for the racing schedule for the rest of the year to develop. "You plan on being at Louisville in five weeks and we have a horse who had a great chance to win on the first Saturday in May", said Knowlton. "Now we have to find a path to get him to the first Saturday in September and with the way the world is now, no one knows what that path looks like."

==== Belmont Stakes ====
Governor Larry Hogan of Maryland announced in mid-May that the 2020 Preakness Stakes would be held on October 3. When Belmont Park was finally reopened for racing on June 1, the New York Racing Association (NYRA) was faced with a difficult scheduling choice. If the 2020 Belmont Stakes followed the Preakness, as had become traditional, the race would conflict with the Breeders' Cup to be held in early November. NYRA ultimately decided to hold the race on June 20, making it the first race of the Triple Crown series for the first time. Because many horses, including Tiz the Law, had not raced since the shutdown in March, they also decided to shorten the race from its traditional distance of 1 1/2 miles to 1 1/8 miles, changing it from the longest race of the series to the shortest. "I think given the circumstances this was the best choice", said trainer Todd Pletcher. "A mile and a half wasn't going to fit many horses at this stage. It was the right move."

Tiz the Law was the morning line favorite, at 6-to-5. Tap It to Win went to the early lead and set a moderate pace. Tiz the Law raced in stalking position a few lengths behind, then launched his move on the turn. He moved by Tap It to Win near the head of the stretch and continued to draw away, winning by 3 3/4 lengths. Dr Post closed ground late to finish second. "Barclay had him in great shape", said Knowlton, who had to watch the race remotely as even owners were not allowed at the racetrack. "People were talking about the layoff, but he won (after) eight weeks off and nine weeks off, and now he did it in (12). Barclay was brimming with confidence, which is unlike him, and 'Tiz' got the job done easily."

Although many jockeys had sought the mount, Tagg stayed with the relatively inexperienced Manuel Franco, who thus won the Belmont in his first try. Tiz the Law became the first New-York bred to win the race since Forester in 1882.

==== Travers Stakes ====
Because of Sackatoga Stables' connections to Saratoga, one of their main goals was to win the racetrack's premier race, the Travers Stakes. Normally scheduled at the end of August, the Travers was moved up to August 8 as part of the 2020 changes to the racing schedule prompted by the COVID-19 pandemic. Attendance at the track was limited, but unlike at the Belmont Stakes, some of the owners were allowed to attend. Tiz the Law was made the heavy 1-2 favorite in a field of seven, with Uncle Chuck the second choice at almost 3–1. Uncle Chuck went to the early lead and set a reasonable pace with Tiz the Law poised to the outside about a length behind. Rounding the final turn, Tiz the Law moved gradually closer. Uncle Chuck's jockey went to the whip while Franco on Tiz the Law remained still until they entered the stretch. Franco then released his horse, who quickly opened a lead of several lengths. Tiz the Law geared down for the final sixteenth but still won going away by 5 1/2 lengths. "He gave me chills", Franco said. "When I pressed the button, he just took off. He accelerated really hard. After that, I took a peek back and he was going away, and I just saved horse. I'm looking forward to the next race."

"After winning the Kentucky Derby [with Funny Cide in 2002], which is really the highlight for anyone who is involved in this sport, this is easily number 2", said Knowlton. "It's quite an accomplishment for our little stable of New York-breds, and for Barclay Tagg training them, to win the two biggest races in New York. We're just thrilled to death."

==== Kentucky Derby ====
Tiz the Law's next start was the Kentucky Derby on September 5, in which he was the heavy favorite. On the far turn, Tiz The Law sprinted into second place and started moving closer and closer to the leader, Authentic. But he couldn't make up the lengths he needed to overtake the leader, finishing second by 1 1/4 lengths.

On September 22, the owning stable of Tiz the Law announced that he would not run in the 2020 Preakness Stakes.

==== Breeders' Cup Classic ====
Tiz the Law next raced in the 2020 Breeders' Cup Classic where he finished sixth. He was expected to do a lot better, but from his number 2 post he had to run on the rail when he usually runs best on the outside, and had a rough trip down the homestretch.

== Retirement and stud careers ==
Tiz the Law's racing career came to an end in December 2020, upon veterinary advice. It was at Ashford Stud in Kentucky in January 2021 that he stated his life as a breeding stallion.

=== Notable progeny ===
c = colt, f = filly, g = gelding

Foaled	Name	Sex	Major Wins
2022	Eunomia	F	Clement L. Hirsch Stakes
2022	Fully Subscribed	F	Personal Ensign Stakes, Mother Goose Stakes, Shuvee Stakes, Spinster Stakes
2022	Tiztastic	C	Louisiana Derby
2022	Usha	F	La Brea Stakes
2023	Caroline St. Beat	C	Nashville Derby

== Racing statistics ==
Date	Age	Distance	Race	Grade	Track	Odds	Field	Finish	Winning Time	Winning (Losing) Margin	Jockey	Ref
Aug 8, 2019	2	6 1/2 furlongs	Maiden Special Weight		Saratoga	3.55	8	1	1:18.02	4 1/2 lengths	Junior Alvarado	
Oct 5, 2019	2	1 mile	Champagne Stakes	I	Belmont Park	1.40	6	1	1:35.41	4 lengths	Manuel Franco	
Nov 30, 2019	2	1 1/16 miles	Kentucky Jockey Club Stakes	II	Churchill Downs	0.60*	8	3	1:45.94	(3/4 lengths)	Manuel Franco	
Feb 1, 2020	3	1 1/16 miles	Holy Bull Stakes	III	Gulfstream Park	1.30*	7	1	1:42.04	3 lengths	Manuel Franco	
Mar 28, 2020	3	1 1/8 miles	Florida Derby	I	Gulfstream Park	1.40*	9	1	1:50.00	4 1/4 lengths	Manuel Franco	
Jun 20, 2020	3	1 1/8 miles	Belmont Stakes	I	Belmont Park	0.80*	10	1	1:46.53	3 3/4 lengths	Manuel Franco	
Aug 8, 2020	3	1 1/4 miles	Travers Stakes	I	Saratoga	0.50*	7	1	2:00.95	5 1/2 lengths	Manuel Franco	
Sep 5, 2020	3	1 1/4 miles	Kentucky Derby	I	Churchill Downs	0.70*	15	2	2:00.61	(1 1/4 lengths)	Manuel Franco	
Nov 7, 2020	3	1 1/4 miles	Breeders' Cup Classic	I	Keeneland	3.20*	10	6	1:59.60	(7 ¼ lengths)	Manuel Franco	

== Pedigree ==
Pedigree of Tiz the Law (USA), 2017
Sire Constitution (USA) 2011	Tapit (USA); 2001	Pulpit	A.P. Indy
Sire Constitution (USA) 2011	Tapit (USA); 2001	Pulpit	Preach
Sire Constitution (USA) 2011	Tapit (USA); 2001	Tap Your Heels	Unbridled
Sire Constitution (USA) 2011	Tapit (USA); 2001	Tap Your Heels	Ruby Slippers
Sire Constitution (USA) 2011	Baffled (USA); 2005	Distorted Humor	Forty Niner
Sire Constitution (USA) 2011	Baffled (USA); 2005	Distorted Humor	Danzig's Beauty
Sire Constitution (USA) 2011	Baffled (USA); 2005	Surf Club	Ocean Crest
Sire Constitution (USA) 2011	Baffled (USA); 2005	Surf Club	Horns Gray
Dam Tizfiz (USA) 2004	Tiznow (USA); 1997	Cee's Tizzy	Relaunch
Dam Tizfiz (USA) 2004	Tiznow (USA); 1997	Cee's Tizzy	Tizly
Dam Tizfiz (USA) 2004	Tiznow (USA); 1997	Cee's Song	Seattle Song
Dam Tizfiz (USA) 2004	Tiznow (USA); 1997	Cee's Song	Lonely Dancer
Dam Tizfiz (USA) 2004	Gin Running (USA); 1997	Go For Gin	Cormorant
Dam Tizfiz (USA) 2004	Gin Running (USA); 1997	Go For Gin	Never Knock
Dam Tizfiz (USA) 2004	Gin Running (USA); 1997	Crafty And Evil	Crafty Prospector
Dam Tizfiz (USA) 2004	Gin Running (USA); 1997	Crafty And Evil	Evil Elaine
