= Midway Road =

American-bred Thoroughbred racehorse

- Sire: Jade Hunter
- Grandsire: Mr. Prospector
- Dam: Fleet Road
- Damsire: Magesterial
- Sex: Stallion
- Foaled: 2000
- Country: United States
- Colour: Bay
- Breeder: William S. Farish
- Owner: William S. Farish
- Trainer: Neil J. Howard
- Record: 17: 7-2-2
- Earnings: $695,060

Major wins
- Fayette Stakes (2004); Ben Ali Stakes (2004); Tenacious Handicap (2004) American Classic Race placing: Preakness Stakes 2nd (2003)
- Last updated on September 12, 2009

Midway Road (foaled April 11, 2000) is an American Thoroughbred racehorse. A descendant of Mr. Prospector, he was sired by Jade Hunter and bred by Will Farish. Midway Road is a multiple graded stakes winner best remembered for his two grade one runner-up finishes in important stake races during his career. Most notably, he finished second in the 2003 Preakness Stakes.

== Three-year-old season ==
Trained by Neil Howard, Midway Road won four of six races early in his career. He broke his maiden at Arlington Park in Chicago, Illinois at age two. As a sophomore, he won two allowance races at Keeneland before his connections entered him in the 2003 Preakness Stakes. He was listed as the longest shot in the field on the morning line at 20-1 along with New York Hero and Kissin Saint.

Midway Road broke in good order and settled in sixth of ten runners going into the first turn of the Preakness. He was squeezed in tight and then piloted by jockey Robby Albarado along the inside path early. Just after the five-eighths pole, Midway Road made his move to engage the top three. With only one furlong to go, he skimmed the rail just to the inside of Louisiana Derby winner Peace Rules and hooked up with him in a head-to-head battle. In the meantime, Kentucky Derby winner Funny Cide pulled away from the rest of the field and won by 9-3/4 lengths (the second-largest winning margin in 128 years at that time). Midway Road finished second and earned $200,000. He beat Peace Rules by 3/4 of a length and also finished ahead of Scrimshaw, Senor Swinger, local favorite Cherokee's Boy, Foufa's Warrior, New York Hero, Kissin Kris and Ten Cents a Shine. Trainer Neil Howard said, "He had a good trip but he may have been in a little too tight. He was forced to take the inside path about mid-race."

Later that summer, Midway Road also placed in the 2003 grade two Ohio Derby at Thistledown Racecourse outside Cleveland, Ohio, to Wild and Wicked.

== Four-year-old season ==
In his four-year-old season, Midway Road set a track record at Keeneland Race Course when he covered 1-1/8 miles in 1:46.78 in winning the grade three Ben Ali Stakes in 2004 by a record 11 1/4 lengths. That day, he defeated the stakes winners Evening Attire and Sir Cherokee. Later that year, he finished second to Southern Image in the grade one Pimlico Special Handicap.

Midway Road then scored consecutive stakes wins in the grade three Fayette Stakes at Keeneland Race Course and Tenacious Handicap at Fair Grounds Race Course in New Orleans, Louisiana.

== Retirement ==
Midway Road did not race since fracturing a cannon bone in a January workout in 2005. After eight months of rehabilitation, he was not progressing to the satisfaction of his trainer and was retired to stand stud at owner-breeder William S. Farish's Lane's End Farm in Versailles, Kentucky. His first season of breeding was in the early spring of 2006 for a stud fee of $7,500. He was transferred to Lane's End Farm Farm Texas in Hempstead, Texas, for a stud fee of $4,000. His first foals were yearlings of 2008 and raced as three-year-olds in 2010. After being sold to Trophy Club Training Center in Royal, Arkansas in 2010, he is now currently pensioned from stud duty and was re-homed to his current owner, and his former racetrack groom, in Florida.
