= Wadsworth Memorial Handicap =

The Wadsworth Memorial Handicap is a Thoroughbred race for horses three years old and older of either gender set at a distance of one and one eighth miles on the dirt. Run at Finger Lakes Race Track on the 4th of July each year (the track is 46 years old in 2007), the Wadsworth is an ungraded stakes race offering a purse of $50,000.

In 2007, in order to attract the dual classic winner (Kentucky Derby & Preakness Stakes), Funny Cide, to the 31st running of the Wadsworth, Finger Lake Race Track raised the purse to $100,000.

The Wadsworth will be in its 35th running in 2010.

== Past winners ==
- 2009 - Sweetnorthernsaint (John Davila Jr.)
- 2008 - Rises the Phoenix
- 2007 – Funny Cide (Alan Garcia) (1:51.77)
- 2006 – Johnie Bye Night
- 2005 - Sinister G
- 2004 - Dulce de Leche (Joe Badamo)
- 2003 - Right Stop
- 2002 - Toddler
- 2001 - Woodwork
- 2000 - Turbulent Spirit, Salish Prince - (dead heat)
- 1999 - Missionary Monk
- 1998 - Cherokee Reef
- 1997 - C B Account
- 1996 - Rosie's Buddy
- 1995 - Le Frisky
- 1994 - Baron Von Blixen
- 1993 - Dangerous Dawn
- 1992 - Dangerous Dawn
- 1991 - Brave Beast
- 1990 - Sea Hunter
- 1989 - Matthew's Moment
- 1988 - Lord Penguin
- 1987 - Lord Penguin
- 1986 - Spruce Arrow
- 1985 - Last Tactic
- 1984 - Org
- 1982 - The Boy Mikey
- 1981 - Captain Pat
- 1980 - Fio Rito
- 1979 - Helpful Henry
- 1978 - Bout
- 1975 - Sole Image
- 1974 - Nashem Bay
