= Funny Cide Stakes =

- Class: Restricted stakes (NY bred)
- Location: Saratoga Race Course; Saratoga Springs, New York, United States
- Inaugurated: 2009
- Race type: Thoroughbred - Flat racing
- Website: www.nyra.com/saratoga/stakes-race/funny-cide-nyb/

Race information
- Distance: 6 1/2 furlongs
- Surface: Dirt
- Track: left-handed
- Qualification: Two-years-old, bred in NY state
- Purse: $200,000

The Funny Cide Stakes is an American Thoroughbred horse race for two-year-old horses bred in New York, approved by the New York State-Bred Registry, and run at Saratoga Race Course in Saratoga Springs, New York. An ungraded stakes race, it is set at a distance of 6 1/2 furlongs on the dirt and currently offers a purse of $200,000.

Named for Funny Cide, the first New York bred horse to win the Kentucky Derby and the first gelding to win since Clyde Van Dusen in 1929, this race was first run on August 28, 2009.

In 2014, this race was part of the inaugural "Saratoga Showcase Day" featuring New York State bred horses.

In 2009 this race was set at 9 furlongs. After a gap, in 2014 it was restricted to two-year-olds bred in the state of New York.

== Record ==
Most wins by a jockey

- 2 – John R. Velazquzez (2015, 2016)
- 2 – Manny Franco (2021, 2023)
- 2 – Irad Ortiz Jr. (2022, 2024)

Most wins by a trainer

- 3 – Todd A. Pletcher (2015, 2016, 2023)

Most wins by an owner

- 2 – Reeves Thoroughbred Racing (2019, 2021)

== Past winners ==
Year	Winner	Jockey	Trainer	Owner	Distance	Time
2025	Minorinconvenience	Ricardo Santana Jr.	Amelia J. Green	Amelia J. Green, Amanda L. Gillman & Upland Flats Racing	6 furlongs	1:11.56
2024	Mo Plex	Irad Ortiz Jr.	Jeremiah C. Englehart	R and H Stable	6 furlongs	1:11.72
2023	The Wine Steward	Manny Franco	Todd A. Pletcher	Michael J. Maker	6 furlongs	1:10.92
2022	Andiamo a Firenze	Irad Ortiz Jr.	Kelly J. Breen	Mr. Amore Stable	6 1/2 furlongs	1:18.72
2021	Senbei	Manny Franco	Christophe Clement	Reeves Thoroughbred Racing, Darlene Bilinski	6 1/2 furlongs	1:18.09
2020	Thin White Duke	Joel Rosario	David Donk	Philip A. Gleaves	6 1/2 furlongs	1:16.75
2019	City Man	Joel Rosario	Christophe Clement	Reeves Thoroughbred Racing, Peter Searles, Patty Searles	6 1/2 furlongs	1:16.93
2018	Dugout	Javier Castellano	Larry Rivelli	Richard Ravin, Patricia's Hope LLC & Larry Rivelli	6 1/2 furlongs	1:16.43
2017	Aveenu Malcainu	Luis Saez	Jeremiah C. Englehart	Goldsquare LLC	6 1/2 furlongs	1:17.69
2016	Syndergaard	John R. Velazquez	Todd A. Pletcher	Jerry Fein, Christopher Fein, Eric, McKenna Harris, Guri Singh and Walia Singh	6 1/2 furlongs	1:16.75
2015	Sudden Surprise	John R. Velazquez	Todd A. Pletcher	Repole Stable	6 1/2 furlongs	1:16.42
2014	Upstart	José Ortiz	Rick Violette	Ralph M. Evans	6 1/2 furlongs	1:16.23
2009	Future Prospect	Rajiv Maragh	Dodson Skaggs	Dodson H. Skaggs	1 mile	1:50.12
