= Constitution (horse) =

American thoroughbred racehorse

- Sire: Tapit
- Grandsire: Pulpit
- Dam: Baffled
- Damsire: Distorted Humor
- Sex: Colt
- Foaled: February 11th, 2011
- Country: USA
- Breeder: Grapestock LLC & Fox Hill Farm
- Owner: WinStar Farm LLC and Twin Creeks Racing Stables, LLC
- Trainer: Todd A. Pletcher
- Jockey: Javier Castellano
- Record: 8:4-0-1
- Earnings: $1,031,596

Major wins
- Donn Handicap (2015); Florida Derby (2014)

Constitution (foaled February 11, 2011) is an American Thoroughbred racehorse and the winner of the 2015 Donn Handicap. He is also known for being the sire of 2020 Belmont Stakes winner, Tiz the Law.

== Career ==
Constitution's first race was on January 11, 2014, at Gulfstream Park, where he came in first in a Maiden Special Weight race. He then followed it up with another victory on February 22, 2014, in an Allowance Optional Claiming race at Gulfstream Park.

On March 29, 2014, he picked up his first graded race win when he won the Grade 1 Florida Derby, beating Wildcat Red by a neck.

He came in 4th in an Allowance Optional Claiming race at Belmont Park on October 12, 2014. Then on November 28, 2014, at the Grade-1 Clark Handicap, he came in 3rd place behind race winner Hoppertunity and Protonico.

He started off his 2015 season strong by picking up a Grade-1 win at the February 7th, 2015, Donn Handicap. He won by 3/4th's of a length. The win would end up being his last victory of his career.

He came in 5th at the September 7th 2015 Grade-2 Bernard Baruch Handicap and retired after a 6th-place finish at the Grade-1 Jockey Gold Cup Stakes on October 3, 2015.

Constitution was retired to stud for Winstar Farm soon after his final race in October 2015.

== Stud career ==
Pedigree descendants include:

c = colt, f = filly

Foaled	Name	Sex	Major Wins
2017	Tiz the Law	c	Belmont Stakes, Florida Derby
2017	Laura's Light	f	San Clemente Stakes, Honeymoon Stakes
2017	Independence Hall	c	Nashua Stakes
2018	Americanrevolution	c	Cigar Mile Handicap
2018	Niquense	c	Clásico St. Leger (Chilean St.Leger)
2018	Y Nada Más	f	Nacional Ricardo Lyon, Clásico El Ensayo, Las Oaks
2020	Spazzatura	c	Gran Premio Hipodromo Chile
2021	Mindframe	c	Churchill Downs Stakes, Stephen Foster Stakes
2024	American History	c	Breeders' Futurity Stakes

== Pedigree ==
Pedigree of Constitution (USA), bay horse, 2011
Sire Tapit (USA) 2001	Pulpit (USA); 1994	A.P. Indy	Seattle Slew
Sire Tapit (USA) 2001	Pulpit (USA); 1994	A.P. Indy	Weekend Surprise
Sire Tapit (USA) 2001	Pulpit (USA); 1994	Preach	Mr. Prospector
Sire Tapit (USA) 2001	Pulpit (USA); 1994	Preach	Narrate
Sire Tapit (USA) 2001	Tap Your Heels (1996); USA)	Unbridled	Fappiano
Sire Tapit (USA) 2001	Tap Your Heels (1996); USA)	Unbridled	Gana Facil
Sire Tapit (USA) 2001	Tap Your Heels (1996); USA)	Ruby Slippers	Nijinsky
Sire Tapit (USA) 2001	Tap Your Heels (1996); USA)	Ruby Slippers	Moon Glitter
Dam Baffled (USA) 2005	Distorted Humor (USA); 1993	Forty Niner	Mr. Prospector
Dam Baffled (USA) 2005	Distorted Humor (USA); 1993	Forty Niner	File
Dam Baffled (USA) 2005	Distorted Humor (USA); 1993	Danzigs Beauty	Danzig
Dam Baffled (USA) 2005	Distorted Humor (USA); 1993	Danzigs Beauty	Sweetest Chant
Dam Baffled (USA) 2005	Surf Club (USA); 1998	Ocean Crest	Storm Bird
Dam Baffled (USA) 2005	Surf Club (USA); 1998	Ocean Crest	S S Aroma
Dam Baffled (USA) 2005	Surf Club (USA); 1998	Horn's Gray	Pass the Tab
Dam Baffled (USA) 2005	Surf Club (USA); 1998	Horn's Gray	Cox's Angel
