= Florida Derby =

American Thoroughbred horse race

- Class: Grade I
- Location: Gulfstream Park; Hallandale Beach, Florida, USA
- Inaugurated: 1952
- Race type: Thoroughbred – Flat racing
- Website: www.floridaderby.com

Race information
- Distance: 1 1/8 miles (9 furlongs)
- Surface: Dirt
- Track: Left-handed
- Qualification: Three-year-olds
- Weight: 122 lbs (55.3 kg)
- Purse: $1,000,000

The Florida Derby is an American Thoroughbred horse race for three-year-old horses held annually at Gulfstream Park in Hallandale Beach, Florida. Since 2005, it has been run five weeks before the Kentucky Derby, which is held on the first Saturday in May. Thus the Florida Derby is currently run either at the end of March or the beginning of April. Added to the racing schedule in 1952, the Grade I race is run at 1 1/8 miles on the dirt. The purse was increased to $1 million in 2011 but was reduced to $750,000 for 2020 and 2021 due to the COVID-19 pandemic. The purse was once again increased to $1 million in 2022.

== History ==
The Florida Derby was first run in 1952. It has long been a prestigious prep race for the Kentucky Derby and since 2013 has been part of the official Road to the Kentucky Derby.

The race was originally run in early to mid-March and Kentucky Derby hopefuls would then run in another major prep race in April. In 2005, Gulfstream Park shifted its scheduling to run the race five weeks before the Kentucky Derby. This was originally believed to be a liability, as the preferred spacing of races is typically three to four weeks. When Barbaro won the 2006 Kentucky Derby, the five-week spacing began to be viewed as a potentially positive feature, allowing a horse to come into the Kentucky Derby well rested.

In 1977, a large field resulted in the race being run in two divisions.

Between 1926 and 1937, the Flamingo Stakes was known as the Florida Derby.

== Triple Crown Classic Winners ==
In total, 21 winners of the Florida Derby have gone on to win one or more Triple Crown Classics (Kentucky Derby, Preakness Stakes, and Belmont Stakes).

Kentucky Derby Winners: Needles (1956), Tim Tam (1958), Carry Back (1961), Northern Dancer (1964), Forward Pass (1968), Spectacular Bid (1979), Swale (1984), Unbridled (1990), Thunder Gulch (1995), Monarchos (2001), Barbaro (2006), Big Brown (2008), Orb (2013), Nyquist (2016), and Always Dreaming (2017).

- In 1968, Florida Derby winner Forward Pass was promoted to first place in the Kentucky Derby after the original winner, Dancer's Image, was disqualified due to a medication violation.
- In 2019, Florida Derby winner Maximum Security crossed the finish line first in the Kentucky Derby, but was disqualified due to interference.

Preakness Stakes Winners: Nashua (1955), Tim Tam (1958), Bally Ache (1960), Carry Back (1961), Candy Spots (1963), Northern Dancer (1964), Forward Pass (1968), Spectacular Bid (1979), Snow Chief (1986), and Big Brown (2008).

Belmont Stakes Winners: Nashua (1955), Needles (1956), Swale (1984), Thunder Gulch (1995), Empire Maker (2003), and Tiz the Law (2020).

== Records ==
Speed Record:

- 1:46.80 – Gen. Duke (1957), equaled the world record for 1 1/8 miles at the time.

Most wins by an owner:

- 5 – Calumet Farm (1957, 1958, 1968, 1971, 1978)

Most wins by a jockey:

- 6 – John R. Velazquez (2009, 2013, 2015, 2017, 2018, 2024)

Most wins by a trainer:

- 8 – Todd A. Pletcher (2007, 2014, 2015, 2017, 2018, 2021, 2023, 2024)

Largest margin of victory:

- 13 1/2 lengths – Fierceness (2024)

Shortest priced winners:

- $2.10 (1/20 on) – Honest Pleasure (1976), Spectacular Bid (1979)

Longest priced winner:

- $183.60 (~91/1) – Williamstown Kid (1966)

== Winners ==
Year	Winner	Jockey	Trainer	Owner	Time	Purse	Gr.
2026	Commandment	Flavien Prat	Brad H. Cox	Wathan Racing	1:49.99	$1,000,000	G1
2025	Tappan Street	Luis Saez	Brad H. Cox	Winstar Farm & China Horse Club Inc.	1:49.27	$1,000,000	G1
2024	Fierceness	John R. Velazquez	Todd A. Pletcher	Repole Stable	1:48.22	$1,000,000	G1
2023	Forte	Irad Ortiz Jr.	Todd A. Pletcher	Repole Stable & St. Elias Stable	1:49.37	$1,000,000	G1
2022	White Abarrio	Tyler Gaffalione	Saffie A. Joseph Jr.	C2 Racing Stable & La Milagrosa Stable	1:50.64	$1,000,000	G1
2021	Known Agenda	Irad Ortiz Jr.	Todd A. Pletcher	St. Elias Stable	1:49.45	$750,000	G1
2020	Tiz the Law	Manny Franco	Barclay Tagg	Sackatoga Stable	1:50.00	$750,000	G1
2019	Maximum Security	Luis Saez	Jason Servis	Mary & Gary West	1:48.86	$1,000,000	G1
2018	Audible	John R. Velazquez	Todd A. Pletcher	China Horse Club, Head of Plains Partners, Starlight Racing & WinStar Farm	1:49.48	$1,000,000	G1
2017	Always Dreaming	John R. Velazquez	Todd A. Pletcher	Brooklyn Boyz Stables, Teresa Viola Racing Stable, Siena Farm, West Point Thoroughbreds, MeB Racing & St. Elias Stable	1:47.47	$1,000,000	G1
2016	Nyquist	Mario Gutierrez	Doug O'Neill	Reddam Racing	1:49.11	$1,000,000	G1
2015	Materiality	John R. Velazquez	Todd A. Pletcher	Alto Racing	1:52.30	$1,000,000	G1
2014	Constitution	Javier Castellano	Todd A. Pletcher	Winstar Farm	1:49.17	$1,000,000	G1
2013	Orb	John Velazquez	Claude. R. McGaughey III	Stuart S. Janney III & Phipps Stable	1:50.87	$1,000,000	G1
2012	Take Charge Indy	Calvin Borel	Patrick B. Byrne	Chuck & Maribeth Sandford	1:48.79	$1,000,000	G1
2011	Dialed In	Julien Leparoux	Nick Zito	Robert V. LaPenta	1:50.74	$1,000,000	G1
2010	Ice Box	Jose Lezcano	Nick Zito	Robert V. LaPenta	1:49.19	$750,000	G1
2009	Quality Road	John Velazquez	James A. Jerkens	Edward P. Evans	1:47.72	$750,000	G1
2008	Big Brown	Kent Desormeaux	Richard E. Dutrow Jr.	IEAH Stables & Paul Pompa Jr.	1:48.16	$1,000,000	G1
2007	Scat Daddy	Edgar Prado	Todd A. Pletcher	James Scatuorchio & Michael Tabor	1:49.00	$1,000,000	G1
2006	Barbaro	Edgar Prado	Michael Matz	Lael Stables	1:49.01	$1,000,000	G1
2005	High Fly	Jerry Bailey	Nick Zito	Live Oak Plantation	1:49.43	$1,000,000	G1
2004	Friends Lake	Richard Migliore	John C. Kimmel	Chester & Mary Broman	1:51.38	$1,000,000	G1
2003	Empire Maker	Jerry Bailey	Robert Frankel	Juddmonte Farms	1:49.05	$1,000,000	G1
2002	Harlan's Holiday	Edgar Prado	Kenneth McPeek	Starlight Stable (Jack & Laurie Wolf)	1:48.80	$1,000,000	G1
2001	Monarchos	Jorge Chavez	John T. Ward Jr.	John C. Oxley	1:49.95	$1,000,000	G1
2000	Hal's Hope	Roger Velez	Harold J. Rose	Rose Family Stable	1:51.49	$1,000,000	G1
1999	Vicar	Shane Sellers	Carl Nafzger	James B. Tafel	1:50.83	$750,000	G1
1998	Cape Town (Note: Lil's Lad finished 1st but was disqualified to 2nd)	Shane Sellers	D. Wayne Lukas	Overbrook Farm	1:49.21	$750,000	G1
1997	Captain Bodgit	Alex Solis	Gary Capuano	Team Valor	1:50.60	$750,000	G1
1996	Unbridled's Song	Mike Smith	James T. Ryerson	Paraneck Stable	1:47.85	$750,000	G1
1995	Thunder Gulch	Mike Smith	D. Wayne Lukas	Michael Tabor	1:49.70	$500,000	G1
1994	Holy Bull	Mike Smith	Warren A. Croll Jr.	Warren A. Croll Jr.	1:47.66	$500,000	G1
1993	Bull Inthe Heather	Wigberto Ramos	Howard M. Tesher	Arthur Klein	1:51.38	$500,000	G1
1992	Technology	Jerry Bailey	Hubert Hine	Scott C. Savin	1:50.72	$500,000	G1
1991	Fly So Free	José A. Santos	Scotty Schulhofer	Tommy Valando	1:50.44	$500,000	I
1990	Unbridled	Pat Day	Carl Nafzger	Genter Stable	1:52.00	$500,000	G1
1989	Mercedes Won	Earlie Fires	Arnold Fink	Christopher Spencer	1:49.60	$500,000	G1
1988	Brian's Time	Randy Romero	John M. Veitch	James W. Phillips	1:49.80	$500,000	G1
1987	Cryptoclearance	José A. Santos	Scotty Schulhofer	Phil Teinowitz	1:49.60	$500,000	G1
1986	Snow Chief	Alex Solis	Melvin F. Stute	Carl Grinstead & Ben Rochelle	1:51.80	$500,000	G1
1985	Proud Truth	Jorge Velásquez	John M. Veitch	Darby Dan Farm	1:50.00	$500,000	G1
1984	Swale	Laffit Pincay Jr.	Woody Stephens	Claiborne Farm	1:47.60	$300,000	G1
1983	Croeso	Frank Olivares	Stephen A. DiMauro	Cardiff Stud Farm, Jerry Fowler & Roy Fowler	1:49.80	$300,000	G1
1982	Timely Writer	Jeffrey Fell	Dominic Imprescia	Peter Martin & Francis Martin	1:49.60	$250,000	G1
1981	Lord Avie	Chris McCarron	Daniel Perlsweig	David Simon	1:50.40	$250,000	G1
1980	Plugged Nickle	Buck Thornburg	Thomas J. Kelly	John M. Schiff	1:50.20	$250,000	G1
1979	Spectacular Bid	Ronnie Franklin	Bud Delp	Hawksworth Farm (Harry & Teresa Meyerhoff)	1:48.80	$200,000	G1
1978	Alydar	Jorge Velásquez	John M. Veitch	Calumet Farm	1:47.00	$200,000	G1
1977 Div 2	Ruthie's Native	Craig Perret	Eugene Jacobs	Ruth A. Perlmutter	1:50.20	$125,000	G1
1977 Div 1	Coined Silver	Buck Thornburg	George T. Poole III	Cornelius V. Whitney	1:48.80	$125,000	G1
1976	Honest Pleasure	Braulio Baeza	LeRoy Jolley	Bertram R. Firestone	1:47.80	$125,000	G1
1975	Prince Thou Art	Braulio Baeza	Lou Rondinello	Darby Dan Farm	1:50.40	$150,000	G1
1974	Judger	Laffit Pincay Jr.	Woody Stephens	Claiborne Farm	1:49.00	$150,000	G1
1973	Royal and Regal	Walter Blum	Warren A. Croll Jr.	Aisco Stable	1:47.40	$130,000	
1972	Upper Case	Ron Turcotte	Lucien Laurin	Meadow Stable	1:50.00	$130,000	
1971	Eastern Fleet	Eddie Maple	Reggie Cornell	Calumet Farm	1:47.40	$125,000	
1970	My Dad George	Ray Broussard	Frank J. McManus	Raymond M. Curtis	1:50.80	$125,000	
1969	Top Knight	Manuel Ycaza	Raymond F. Metcalf	Steven B. Wilson	1:48.40		
1968	Forward Pass	Don Brumfield	Henry Forrest	Calumet Farm	1:49.00		
1967	In Reality	Earlie Fires	Melvin Calvert	Frances A. Genter	1:50.20		
1966	Williamston Kid (Note: Abe's First finished 1st but was disqualified to 4th)	Robert Stevenson	James Bartlett	Paul F. Ternes & James Bartlett	1:50.60		
1965	Native Charger	John L. Rotz	Raymond F. Metcalf	Warner Stable	1:51.20		
1964	Northern Dancer	Bill Shoemaker	Horatio Luro	Windfields Farm	1:50.80		
1963	Candy Spots	Bill Shoemaker	Mesh Tenney	Rex C. Ellsworth	1:50.60		
1962	Ridan	Manuel Ycaza	LeRoy Jolley	Mrs. Moody Jolley, Ernest Woods, John L. Greer	1:50.40		
1961	Carry Back	Johnny Sellers	Jack A. Price	Katherine Price	1:48.80		
1960	Bally Ache	Bobby Ussery	Jimmy Pitt	Edgehill Farm (Leonard D. & Morris Fruchtman)	1:47.60		
1959	Easy Spur	Bill Hartack	Paul L. Kelley	Spring Hill Farm	1:47.20		
1958	Tim Tam	Bill Hartack	Horace A. Jones	Calumet Farm	1:49.20		
1957	Gen. Duke	Bill Hartack	Horace A. Jones	Calumet Farm	1:46.80		
1956	Needles	David Erb	Hugh L. Fontaine	D & H Stable (Jack Dudley & Bonnie Heath)	1:48.60		
1955	Nashua	Eddie Arcaro	Jim Fitzsimmons	Belair Stud	1:53.20		
1954	Correlation	Bill Shoemaker	Noble Threewitt	Robert S. Lytle	1:55.20		
1953	Money Broker	Alfred Popara	Vester R. Wright	G. & G. Stable (T. Alie Grissom & Edward Grosfield)	1:53.80		
1952	Sky Ship	Ronnie Nash	Preston M. Burch	Brookmeade Stable	1:50.80		

== See also ==
- Florida Derby "top three finishers" and starters
- Road to the Kentucky Derby
