= Peace Rules =

American-bred Thoroughbred racehorse

- Sire: Jules
- Grandsire: Forty Niner
- Dam: Hold To Fashion
- Damsire: Hold Your Peace
- Sex: Stallion
- Foaled: 2000
- Country: United States
- Colour: Chestnut
- Breeder: Newchance Farm
- Owner: Edmund A. Gann
- Trainer: 1) Gary C. Contessa; 2) Robert J. Frankel
- Record: 19 Starts: 9 – 2 – 2
- Earnings: $3,084,278

Major wins
- Generous Stakes (2002); Hill Rise Stakes (2002); Blue Grass Stakes (2003); Louisiana Derby (2003); Haskell Invitational Handicap (2003); New Orleans Handicap (2004); Oaklawn Handicap (2004); Suburban Handicap (2004)

Awards
- Florida-bred Horse of the Year (2003)

Honours
- Fair Grounds Racing Hall of Fame (2011)
- Last updated on October 20, 2009

Peace Rules (bred and foaled in Florida at Newchance Farm on April 26, 2000), is a multiple Grade I-winning American Thoroughbred race horse. By Jules, a "black type" winner and classic sire in Brazil, Peace Rules' grandsire was Forty Niner, a son of the great sire- producing stallion, Mr. Prospector, a Leading sire in North America. His dam, Hold To Fashion, has dropped five foals, all winners.

== Early career ==
Initially trained as a juvenile by Gary Contessa, Peace Rules broke his maiden by four lengths on the turf. He was then sold to Edmund A. Gann and transferred to Hall of Famer Robert Frankel. Peace Rules won five times in nine starts before he met Funny Cide in the 2003 Kentucky Derby. Overshadowed in Frankel's barn by Empire Maker, Frankel's pick to win that year's Derby, Peace Rules had won the Grade II Louisiana Derby, beating Funny Cide (second after a late rally), before Empire Maker won a single stakes race. He then won the Grade I Blue Grass Stakes gate to wire, beating Offlee Wild.

== The 2003 Classics ==
Peace Rules was often ridden by jockey Edgar Prado, who won the 2006 Kentucky Derby on the ill-fated Barbaro. Coming into the Derby, Empire Maker was the "chalk" (horse racing term for favorite, taken from the days of a bookmakers chalking the odds on blackboards). Both of Frankel's Derby entries were beaten by the longshot Funny Cide, but Peace Rules led for over a mile and held on for third place and a check for $110,000.

In the Preakness Stakes, Peace Rules was the second choice on the morning-line at 8–5, behind only the Derby winner in a full field of twelve colts. He went to the lead as the field passed the stands for the first time. Scrimshaw pressed Peace Rules, forcing a quickened pace as Funny Cide and Cherokee's Boy sat a few lengths back going into the club-house turn. Coming out of the far turn, Midway Road skimmed up along the rail to challenge the leaders. Funny Cide then rallied to win by 9-3/4 lengths. Midway Road overtook Peace Rules, who held on to third by a neck over Scrimshaw.

== Late career ==
In the summer months of his sophomore campaign, Peace Rules won the grade one Haskell Invitational Handicap, beating Sky Mesa and Funny Cide at Monmouth Park during the first week of August. Then he shipped north and placed second in the grade one Travers Stakes behind Ten Most Wanted at Saratoga Race Course on the last Saturday of August.

In 2004, at age four, Peace Rules won the Grade II New Orleans Handicap (beating Saint Liam and Funny Cide), the Grade II Oaklawn Handicap (again beating Saint Liam), and the Grade I Suburban Handicap by a neck in a three-horse duel with Funny Cide and Newfoundland. In 2004, Peace Rules was listed among the world's top 30 horses in the 2004 World Thoroughbred Racehorse Rankings.

== Peace Rules at stud ==
Peace Rules retired in 2004 to stand at Vinery Stables in Summerfield, Florida. His first winner was Trifecta King, a filly who took Hollywood Park Racetrack's Cinderella Stakes in 2008.

In October 2009, he was sold to the Korea Racing Authority to stand at the KRA'S Jeju Stud Farm. As of August 2012, he had sired the stakes winners Cash Rules, Trifecta King, Peace Town, and Izzy Rules.

In 2011, Peace Rules was inducted into the Fair Grounds Racing Hall of Fame.

== Race record ==
Date	Distance (Condition)	Race	Class	Course	Odds (Favorite)	Field	Finish	Time	Winning (Losing) Margin	Winner (2nd Place)	Jockey	Ref
2002 – two-year-old season
Jul 31	5 furlongs (Fast)	Maiden Special Weight	Maiden	Saratoga	16.00 (7th)	8	3rd	58.50	(2 1/2 lengths)	Mister Deux	Norberto Arroyo Jr.	
Aug 24	6 1/2 furlongs (Sloppy)	Maiden Special Weight	Maiden	Saratoga	7.90 (4th)	11	5th	1:18.54	(4 1/2 lengths)	Atfirst Blush	Norberto Arroyo Jr.	
Sep 25	1 mile (Firm)	Maiden Special Weight	Maiden	Belmont Park	9.20 (3rd)	10	1st	1:34.89	4 lengths	(Kon Tiki)	Jose Santos	
Oct 24	1 mile (Firm)	Pinjara Stakes	Black Type	Santa Anita Park	1.10 (1st)	8	2nd	1:34.64	(head)	Man Among Men	Patrick Valenzuela	
Nov 30	1 mile (Firm)	Generous Stakes	G3	Hollywood Park	2.60 (2nd)	9	1st	1:35.49	1 1/4 lengths	(Lismore Knight)	Victor Espinoza	
Dec 28	1 mile (Firm)	Hill Rise Stakes	Listed	Santa Anita Park	0.40 (1st)	5	1st	1:35.44	3/4 length	(Singletary)	Victor Espinoza	
2003 – three-year-old season
Mar 9	1 1/16 miles (Fast)	Louisiana Derby	G2	Fair Grounds	9.40 (4th)	10	1st	1:42.67	2 1/4 lengths	(Funny Cide)	Edgar Prado	
Apr 12	1 1/8 miles (Fast)	Toyota Blue Grass Stakes	G1	Keeneland	0.60 (1st)	10	1st	1:51.73	3 1/2 lengths	(Brancusi)	Edgar Prado	
May 3	1 1/4 miles (Fast)	Kentucky Derby	G1	Churchill Downs	6.30 (2nd)	16	3rd	2:01.19	(1 3/4 lengths)	Funny Cide	Edgar Prado	
May 17	1 3/16 miles (Good)	Preakness Stakes	G1	Pimlico	2.40 (2nd)	16	4th	1:55.61	(10 1/2 lengths)	Funny Cide	Edgar Prado	
Aug 3	1 1/8 miles (Fast)	Haskell Invitational Handicap	G1	Monmouth Park	2.30 (2nd)	7	1st	1:49.32	1 3/4 lengths	(Sky Mesa)	Edgar Prado	
Aug 23	1 1/4 miles (Fast)	Travers Stakes	G1	Saratoga	2.30 (1st)	6	2nd	2:02.14	(4 1/2 lengths)	Ten Most Wanted	Jerry Bailey	
Oct 25	1 1/4 miles (Fast)	Breeders' Cup Mile	G1	Santa Anita	3.10 (1st)	13	13th	1:33.86	(15 1/2 lengths)	Six Perfections	Edgar Prado	
2004 – four-year-old season
Jan 24	1 1/8 miles (Fast)	Barretts/CTBA Classic Stakes	Black Type	Santa Anita	1.00 (1st)	12	4th	1:47.67	(8 1/2 lengths)	Southern Image	Jerry Bailey	
Feb 29	1 1/8 miles (Fast)	New Orleans Handicap	G2	Fair Grounds	3.60 (3rd)	8	1st	1:48.61	head	(Saint Liam)	Jerry Bailey	
Apr 3	1 1/8 miles (Fast)	Oaklawn Handicap	G2	Oaklawn Park	0.80 (1st)	8	1st	1:48.26	2 lengths	(Ole Faunty)	Jerry Bailey	
Jun 12	1 1/8 miles (Sloppy)	Stephen Foster Handicap	G1	Churchill Downs	2.80 (3rd)	6	4th	1:50.40	(8 3/4 lengths)	Colonial Colony	Jerry Bailey	
Jul 3	1 1/4 miles (Fast)	Suburban Handicap	G1	Belmont Park	3.20 (2nd)	8	1st	1:59.52	neck	(Newfoundland)	Jerry Bailey	
Aug 7	1 1/8 miles (Fast)	Whitney Handicap	G1	Saratoga	3.05 (1st)	9	6th	1:48.54	(8 1/4 lengths)	Roses In May	Jerry Bailey	

== Pedigree ==
Pedigree of Peace Rules (USA), chestnut stallion, 2000
Sire Jules (USA) 1994	Forty Niner (USA) 1985	Mr. Prospector (USA) (1970)	Raise a Native (USA) (1961)
Sire Jules (USA) 1994	Forty Niner (USA) 1985	Mr. Prospector (USA) (1970)	Gold Digger (USA) (1962)
Sire Jules (USA) 1994	Forty Niner (USA) 1985	File (USA) (1976)	Tom Rolfe (USA) (1962)
Sire Jules (USA) 1994	Forty Niner (USA) 1985	File (USA) (1976)	Continue (USA) (1958)
Sire Jules (USA) 1994	Bonita Francita (USA) 1987	Devil's Bag (USA) (1981)	Halo (USA) (1969)
Sire Jules (USA) 1994	Bonita Francita (USA) 1987	Devil's Bag (USA) (1981)	Ballade (USA) (1972)
Sire Jules (USA) 1994	Bonita Francita (USA) 1987	Raise the Standard (USA) (1978)	Hoist The Flag (USA) (1968)
Sire Jules (USA) 1994	Bonita Francita (USA) 1987	Raise the Standard (USA) (1978)	Natalma (USA) (1957)
Dam Hold to Fashion (USA) 1989	Hold Your Peace (USA) (1969)	Speak John (USA) (1958)	Prince John (USA) (1953)
Dam Hold to Fashion (USA) 1989	Hold Your Peace (USA) (1969)	Speak John (USA) (1958)	Nuit de Folies (FR) (1947)
Dam Hold to Fashion (USA) 1989	Hold Your Peace (USA) (1969)	Blue Moon (USA) (1948)	Eight Thirty (USA) (1936)
Dam Hold to Fashion (USA) 1989	Hold Your Peace (USA) (1969)	Blue Moon (USA) (1948)	Blue Grail (USA) (1943)
Dam Hold to Fashion (USA) 1989	Toga Toga (USA) (1978)	Greek Answer (USA) (1972)	Northern Answer (CAN) (1966)
Dam Hold to Fashion (USA) 1989	Toga Toga (USA) (1978)	Greek Answer (USA) (1972)	Greek Victress (CAN) (1965)
Dam Hold to Fashion (USA) 1989	Toga Toga (USA) (1978)	Dancing Bend (USA) (1990)	Never Bend (USA) (1960)
Dam Hold to Fashion (USA) 1989	Toga Toga (USA) (1978)	Dancing Bend (USA) (1990)	Cerelia (USA) (1965)
