= 2003 Belmont Stakes =

American horse race

135th Belmont Stakes
- Belmont Stakes
- Location: Belmont Park; Elmont, New York, U.S.
- Date: June 7, 2003
- Distance: 1 1/2 mi (12 furlongs; 2,414 m)
- Winning horse: Empire Maker
- Winning time: 2:28.26
- Final odds: 2.00 (to 1)
- Jockey: Jerry Bailey
- Trainer: Robert Frankel
- Owner: Juddmonte Farms
- Conditions: Sloppy
- Surface: Dirt

The 2003 Belmont Stakes was the 135th running of the Belmont Stakes. The 1 1/2-mile (2,400 m) race, known as the "test of the champion" and sometimes called the "final jewel" in thoroughbred horse racing's Triple Crown series, was held on June 7, 2003, three weeks after the Preakness Stakes and five weeks after the Kentucky Derby.

New York-bred Funny Cide won the Derby and Preakness and attracted an enthusiastic following. Before a near-record crowd, Funny Cide's attempt to win the Triple Crown was derailed by Empire Maker, who had finished second as the favorite in the Derby and had skipped the Preakness to train up to the Belmont.

== Pre-race ==
Funny Cide won the 2003 Kentucky Derby in an upset, then turned in a dominating performance to win the Preakness. For the Belmont he faced only five other horses, but all of them were more rested. In particular, Empire Maker had skipped the Preakness after finishing second in the Derby as the favorite. He was considered to have an excellent chance in the Belmont, having beaten Funny Cide earlier in the year in the Wood Memorial.

A crowd of 101,562 showed up despite the cold, rainy weather. It was a near-record for Belmont Park, just behind the 2002 attendance of 103,222 that watched Sarava upset War Emblem's Triple Crown bid.

== Race description ==
Funny Cide broke well and went to the early lead. Although he set reasonable fractions, the jockeys in the race saw cause for concern. José A. Santos on Funny Cide felt the horse was not handling the sloppy track, while Jerry Bailey on Empire Maker felt Funny Cide was running rank, wasting valuable energy. Funny Cide led for the first mile but tired around the far turn where he was passed by Empire Maker. Ten Most Wanted made a late run to finish second, while Funny Cide held on for third.

Despite a Hall of Fame career, it was the first win in a Triple Crown race for trainer Robert Frankel. "I really wanted to win it, more so for the horse," said Frankel. "I just wanted to prove he was the best horse. I was very, very confident all week. I didn't think I could get beat."

Funny Cide became the ninth horse since Affirmed in 1978 to win the first two legs of the Triple Crown, only to fall short in the Belmont. "I am very proud for all of the New Yorkers, Spanish people and New York-bred people who came out to support this horse today," said Santos said. "To win the Triple Crown is very difficult. That is why it has been 25 years since somebody did it."

== Chart ==
| Finish | Program Number | Horse | Margin | Jockey | Trainer | Post Time Odds | Winnings |
|---|---|---|---|---|---|---|---|
| 1 | 1 | Empire Maker | 3/4 | Jerry Bailey | Robert Frankel | 2.00 | $600,000 |
| 2 | 6 | Ten Most Wanted | 4 3/4 | Pat Day | Wallace Dollase | 9.70 | $200,000 |
| 3 | 4 | Funny Cide | 5 1/4 | José A. Santos | Barclay Tagg | 1.00 | $110,000 |
| 4 | 5 | Dynever | 15 1/4 | Edgar Prado | Christophe Clement | 8.50 | $60,000 |
| 5 | 2 | Supervisor | 4 1/2 | John Velazquez | Linda Rice | 14.80 | $30,000 |
| 6 | 3 | Scrimshaw | | Gary Stevens | D. Wayne Lukas | 11.00 | |

Source: Equibase
Times: 1/4 — 0:23.85; 1/2 — 0:48.70; 3/4 — 1:13.51; mile — 1:38.05; 1 1/4 — 2:02.62; final — 2:28.26.
Fractional Splits: (:23.85) (:24.85) (:24.81) (:24.54) (:24.57) (:25.64)

== Payout ==
The 135th Belmont Payout Schedule

| Program Number | Horse Name | Win | Place | Show |
|---|---|---|---|---|
| 1 | Empire Maker | $6.00 | $3.70 | $2.80 |
| 6 | Ten Most Wanted | - | $5.80 | $3.20 |
| 4 | Funny Cide | - | - | $2.70 |

- $2 Exacta (1-6): $44.00
- $2 Trifecta (1-6-4): $67.50

There was no Superfecta betting.

== See also ==
- 2003 Kentucky Derby
- 2003 Preakness Stakes
