= Forester (horse) =

American-bred Thoroughbred racehorse

- Sire: The Ill-Used
- Grandsire: Breadalbane
- Dam: Woodbine
- Damsire: Kentucky
- Sex: Stallion
- Foaled: 1879
- Country: United States
- Breeder: August Belmont Jr.
- Owner: Lucien O. Appleby & Davy C. Johnson
- Trainer: L. Stuart
- Earnings: $13,125

Major wins
- Withers Stakes (1882); Triple Crown wins: Belmont Stakes (1882)
- Last updated on March 3, 2022

Forester was an American Thoroughbred racehorse best known for winning the 1882 Belmont Stakes.

== Background ==
Forester was bred at Nursery Stud in New York by August Belmont Jr. His sire was The Ill-Used, who had been imported into the states, and his dam was Woodbine. Forester was later sold to Lucien O. Appleby & Davy C. Johnson, the owners of La Belle Stud.

== Racing career ==
As a three-year-old, Forester won the Withers Stakes, making him the heavy favorite to win the Belmont Stakes in June of that year. The 1882 Belmont Stakes had a field of only three horses and Forester, ridden by Jim McLaughlin, won the race by five lengths, leading the entire time. He was the last New York-bred horse to win the Belmont until Tiz the Law won in 2020.

Forester took a two-year break from racing after the three-year-old season, and returned in 1885. He raced four more times that year, bringing his total amount of starts to 15. He won five of those races, and his total career earnings were $13,125.

== Pedigree ==
Pedigree of Forester
Sire The Ill-Used 1870	Breadalbane 1862	Stockwell	The Baron
Sire The Ill-Used 1870	Breadalbane 1862	Stockwell	Pocahontas
Sire The Ill-Used 1870	Breadalbane 1862	Blink Bonny	Melbourne
Sire The Ill-Used 1870	Breadalbane 1862	Blink Bonny	Queen Mary
Sire The Ill-Used 1870	Ellermire 1852	Chanticleer	Birdcatcher
Sire The Ill-Used 1870	Ellermire 1852	Chanticleer	Whim
Sire The Ill-Used 1870	Ellermire 1852	Ellerdale	Lanercost
Sire The Ill-Used 1870	Ellermire 1852	Ellerdale	Tomboy Mare
Dam Woodbine 1869	Kentucky 1861	Lexington	Boston
Dam Woodbine 1869	Kentucky 1861	Lexington	Alice Carneal
Dam Woodbine 1869	Kentucky 1861	Magnolia	Glencoe I
Dam Woodbine 1869	Kentucky 1861	Magnolia	Myrtle
Dam Woodbine 1869	Fleur Des Champs 1862	Newminster	Touchstone
Dam Woodbine 1869	Fleur Des Champs 1862	Newminster	Beeswing
Dam Woodbine 1869	Fleur Des Champs 1862	Maria	Harkaway
Dam Woodbine 1869	Fleur Des Champs 1862	Maria	Suspicion
