= Funny Cide =

American-bred Thoroughbred racehorse (2000–2023)

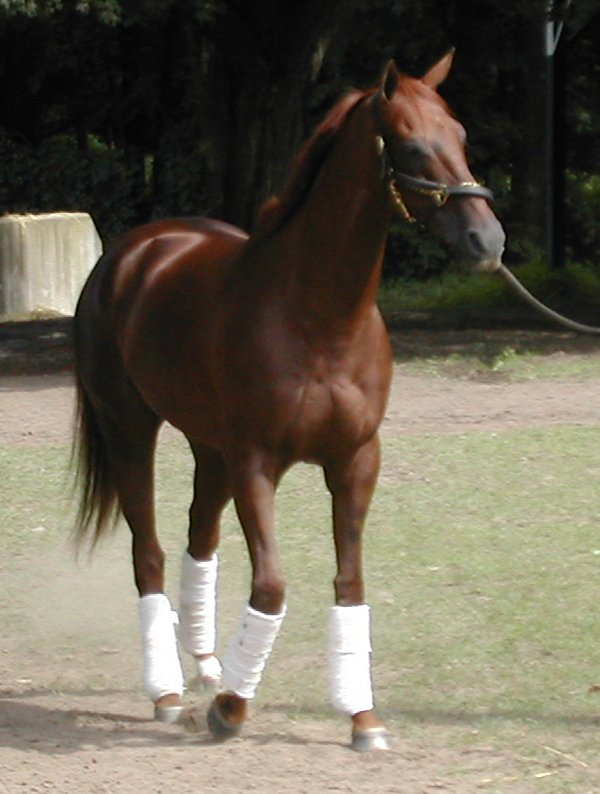
- Funny Cide at Saratoga, September 1, 2006
- Sire: Distorted Humor
- Grandsire: Forty Niner
- Dam: Belle's Good Cide
- Sex: Gelding
- Foaled: April 20, 2000; Saratoga Springs, New York, U.S.
- Died: July 16, 2023 (aged 23); Kentucky Horse Park, Lexington, Kentucky, U.S.
- Country: United States
- Colour: Chestnut
- Breeder: WinStar Farm
- Owner: Sackatoga Stable
- Trainer: Barclay Tagg
- Record: 38: 11-6-8
- Earnings: $3,529,412

Major wins
- Bertram F. Bongard Stakes (2002); Sleepy Hollow Stakes (2002); Excelsior Breeders' Cup Handicap (2004); Jockey Club Gold Cup (2004); Kings Point Handicap (2006); Dominion Day Stakes (Can., 2006); Wadsworth Memorial Handicap (2007) Triple Crown classic race wins: Kentucky Derby (2003); Preakness Stakes (2003)

Awards
- New York Breeders' Award for Champion Two-Year-Old (2002); U.S. Champion 3-Year-Old Male (2003); Champion New York Horse of the Year (2003 & 2004); NTRA "Moment of the Year" (2003); Big Sport of Turfdom Award (Sackatoga Stable 2003); Presidents' Award from New York Turf Writers (2004); New York Thoroughbred Breeders Award as the New York–bred horse of the decade. (2010)

Honours
- Funny Cide Street in Napa, California; Funny Cide written and performed by Blue Hand Luke. Funny Cide Stakes at Saratoga Race Course
- Last updated on 16 July 2023

Funny Cide (April 20, 2000 – July 16, 2023) was an American Thoroughbred champion racehorse who won the 2003 Kentucky Derby and Preakness Stakes. He was the first New York-bred horse to win the Kentucky Derby. He was a popular horse and remained a fan favorite in retirement at the Kentucky Horse Park.

== Background ==
Funny Cide was bred at WinStar Farm in Versailles, Kentucky, but was foaled at the McMahon of Saratoga Thoroughbred Farm, owned by Joe and Anne McMahon in Saratoga Springs, New York. His sire is Distorted Humor, who was then an unproven sire at WinStar, struggling to attract good mares. Belle's Good Cide, an Oklahoma-bred granddaughter of Seattle Slew, was already at the farm, and was therefore bred to him. She was then shipped to New York so her foal would be eligible for New York-bred races.

Joe and Anne McMahon, owners of the farm where Funny Cide was foaled

Funny Cide was part of Distorted Humor's first American crop when his stud fee was $12,500, dropping down the next year to $10,000. Due to the success of Funny Cide and the rest of his first crop, Distorted Humor's fee then rose to $20,000 in 2003. It would eventually go as high as $300,000 in 2008 for a live foal. The fee later dropped, and in 2018 was $50,000.

Funny Cide was consigned to the August 2001 Fasig-Tipton Saratoga-preferred yearling auction, where he was inspected by Tony Everard, a "pinhooker" looking for young, undeveloped horses to train and resell in a few months at a profit. Everard liked what he saw, even though the colt was a ridgling with one undescended testicle, and purchased the colt for $22,000. Everard then took the colt to his New Episode Training Center in Ocala, Florida, and made the decision to geld the colt. "With ridglings, it's better to go ahead and geld them early," he would later say. "My experience is once they start training around turns they are moving faster and getting pinched and it hurts them."

=== Barclay Tagg ===
Barclay Tagg at Saratoga, September 1, 2006

Barclay Tagg purchased the gelding for $75,000 in a private transaction in March, 2002 for Sackatoga Stable.

Once a steeplechase jockey, Tagg (who grew up in Abington, Pennsylvania and won his first race in 1972 at Liberty Bell Park) was a journeyman who had been on the racing scene for over 30 years. The victory by Funny Cide made Tagg the first trainer to win the Derby in his first attempt since Neil Drysdale saddled Fusaichi Pegasus to win the 2000 Derby.

Ray Paulick of The Blood-Horse said of Tagg, "He has some characteristics uncannily like hall-of-famer "Silent" Tom Smith, the trainer of Seabiscuit. He takes care of his horse, doesn't rush into anything or run him when he shouldn't. I like that about Tagg. Like Tom Smith, he's his own man and will put the horse first. I wish we had more trainers out there like him."

=== Sackatoga Stable ===
Sackatoga Stable was formed by ten friends from Sacket's Harbor, a small town in upstate New York, who purchased their first horse by contributing $5,000 each. The managing partner was Jackson Knowlton, a health care consultant. They coined the name Sackatoga by combining their origins in Sacket's Harbor and Saratoga. Knowlton said, "We joined up with Barclay Tagg [in 1999] and he was able to locate a couple of nice horses for us. We claimed Bail Money for $40,000. She won three races and $130,000 for us before she was claimed for $62,500. So that really helped make things easier — we were playing with the house's money when we bought Funny Cide for $75,000."

== Racing career ==
=== 2002: two-year-old season ===
The chestnut gelding, ridden by jockey José A. Santos, made his two-year-old racing debut at Belmont Park on September 8, 2002. Running away from the New York field under a hand ride, he easily won the six-furlong race by 14 3/4 lengths. Three weeks later, Funny Cide won his first seven-furlong stakes race, the Bertram F. Bongard Stakes, under another hand ride, this time by 8 lengths. In the Bongard, his Beyer Speed Figure was 103: no two-year-old in the country had run faster.

His third winning effort as a two-year-old was his first mile race, the Sleepy Hollow Stakes (also at Belmont Park). Under a hard hold by Santos, he was for the first time challenged for the lead (by Spite the Devil). Despite being bumped several times, Funny Cide won by a neck. Santos believed he had found his Derby horse.

Funny Cide was named the Champion two-year-old New-York bred for 2002, though little attention was paid to him nationally. He was not included on the Experimental Free Handicap, which was led by the champion two-year-old Vindication.

=== 2003: three-year-old season ===
Funny Cide began his three-year-old campaign on January 18, 2003, in the 1 1/16-mile Holy Bull Stakes at Gulfstream Park. Breaking from post position 13, he hit the gate and raced wide for the entire trip, eventually finishing fifth behind Offlee Wild. He then shipped to Fair Grounds for the Louisiana Derby on March 9, where he faced Peace Rules, Kafwain, and Badge of Silver. Staying close to the pace, he rallied in the stretch, dropped back, and then came on again along the rail. Finishing third after Peace Rules, he was moved up to second place after the disqualification of Kafwain.

On April 12, he entered the Wood Memorial at Aqueduct as the second betting choice. Empire Maker, conditioned by Hall of Fame trainer Bobby Frankel and ridden by Jerry Bailey, was the odds-on favorite after an impressive win in the Florida Derby. Funny Cide was bumped at the start then moved up to challenge New York Hero on the lead. Empire Maker raced in third, then took the lead as they entered the stretch. Funny Cide fought back gamely, losing by only 1/2 length. Funny Cide earned a Beyer Speed Figure of 110 for the Wood.

==== Kentucky Derby ====
Empire Maker was the favorite for the Derby despite suffering a bruised right front hoof that caused him to miss a few days of training: his odds did drift up though from 6–5 on the morning-line to a more lukewarm 5–2. Peace Rules, also trained by Frankel, was the second choice at 6-1 while Funny Cide was sixth choice at 13–1. Bumped again at the start, Funny Cide tracked the early pace set by Peace Rules, and moved to the lead heading into the stretch. Empire Maker then started closing fast but Funny Cide was able to hold on by 1 1/2 lengths. "I hit him and he kept digging and digging and he did it," said Santos. "It was New York pride." Funny Cide's time of 2:01.19 was the tenth fastest time in Kentucky Derby history. Funny Cide was the first gelding since Clyde Van Dusen in 1929 to win the Derby.

==== Preakness Stakes ====
Blood-Horse magazine's Steven Haskin wrote: "Pimlico stakes coordinator David Rollinson had to go out and recruit Preakness Stakes horses when it looked like only six or seven were going to run. All was calm that first week after the Derby. Then, Empire Maker was officially declared out, leaving only six confirmed starters. Then Midway Road came in. Then all hell broke loose when the Miami Herald's bogus story and photo of Santos cheating in the Derby appeared. Empire Maker suddenly jumped back in, his Triple Crown hopes alive once again. Hours later, when the inferno began to subside, he was back out. Then Peace Rules officially came in. Sometime, in between all that, Champali scratched after colicking. Then Kissin Saint and Alysweep came in. Then Indian Express came out. Then Rollinson popped a couple of Advil and braced for week two." Week two was like week one, now including the in and outs and ins of New York Hero, Ten Cents A Shine, Foufa's Warrior, and During. Haskin said, "All this confusion could have been avoided if all involved had known how Funny Cide was going to run in the Preakness."

Shipped in at the last moment by Tagg and stabled in Mary Eppler's barn to keep him calm and away from the press, this time Funny Cide was the betting favorite. On a cold, wet day in May, he broke from post position nine (only Layminister in 1910 and Canonero II in 1971 won from the ninth post) and was the runaway winner of the 2003 Preakness Stakes at Baltimore's Pimlico Race Course. His time was 1:55:61 and he took the race by 9 3/4 lengths, the second-largest margin in Preakness history.

"I couldn't find my horse, so I was watching Funny Cide," said Bob Baffert, trainer of Senor Swinger, who finished fifth. "It was fun watching and listening to the crowd respond to Funny Cide as he drew off like that."

Funny Cide earned a Beyer Speed Figure of 114. He was only the third New York-bred to win the Preakness. The other two were Jacobus in 1883 and Margrave in 1896 when the Preakness was run at Gravesend Race Track in Coney Island, New York.

==== Belmont Stakes ====
With a Triple Crown on the line, Funny Cide and his connections were the center of attention in the weeks leading up to the 2003 Belmont Stakes. Funny Cide posted several fast works: too fast, some worried. Then it rained all day before the Belmont Stakes, the most grueling of the three Triple Crown races and a quarter mile longer than the Kentucky Derby. Regardless, New Yorkers came to the track in near record numbers, hoping to see the New York-bred make history. Funny Cide broke well and rushed to the early lead, but wasted energy struggling against Santos's efforts to set a sensible pace down the backstretch. As they rounded the final turn, Empire Maker ranged up on the outside and gradually pulled clear. Funny Cide tried to respond but eventually tired, finishing third. The horses who beat him, Empire Maker and Ten Most Wanted, were both fresher horses, having skipped the Preakness Stakes.

Frankel had said before the race that if everyone hated him after the Belmont Stakes, then he had done his job. Robin Smullen, Tagg's assistant and companion, had predicted that win, lose or draw, Funny Cide would remain everyone's favorite horse. Both Frankel and Smullen proved to be correct.

Later that year, Island Fashion, trained by Tagg, won the Alabama Stakes. Her victory denied a $2 million Triple Tiara bonus to the owners of Spoken Fur, trained by Frankel.

Funny Cide became the 17th horse to take the Derby and Preakness and then lose the Belmont. Tagg wondered if the sloppy track may have played a role in the loss, despite training over it nearly every day regardless of weather. "I just feel bad for all the people who came out," Tagg said. "We were beaten by a good horse. I don't know what else to say. I am being honest. It is horse racing."

==== Later three-year-old season ====
Funny Cide was given a two-month break, then returned on August 3 in the Haskell Invitational at Monmouth Park where he finished third to Peace Rules. His next target was supposed to be the Travers Stakes at Saratoga in a face-off against Empire Maker, but both horses became ill and missed the race. In Funny Cide's case it was a respiratory condition, although Tagg didn't know whether the gelding had a lung infection or allergies. During a routine gallop, he started making noise so a veterinarian examined his lungs and found them full of mucus. Funny Cide may have been suffering from the same ailment when he finished third in the Haskell: he showed mucus after that race, as well as an elevated temperature.

Funny Cide missed most of the fall racing season but recovered in time to enter the Breeders' Cup Classic, held that year at Santa Anita Park on October 25. Facing an excellent field, he raced wide just off the pace before fading on the final turn, finishing ninth behind Pleasantly Perfect. Tagg would say later that Funny Cide didn't like the heat.

Funny Cide won the Eclipse Award for 3 Year Old Male of the Year, the first New York-bred to do so. (Saratoga Dew was named American Champion Three-Year-Old Filly of 1992). The voters had to weigh Empire Maker's two wins in their three head-to-head races, versus the brilliance of Funny Cide's two Classic wins. As Andrew Beyer put it: "[Funny Cide] performed honorably throughout the series, while stimulating widespread public interest in the sport. Is he less worthy of a title than a rival who won one race, had an excuse in one and skipped one?" Ultimately, Funny Cide prevailed by 150 votes to 92.

=== 2004: four-year-old season ===
On January 10, 2004, Funny Cide returned to the track with a win in allowance company at Gulfstream Park, followed by third-place finishes in the Donn Handicap and New Orleans Handicap. In April, he won the Excelsior Breeders' Cup Handicap at Aqueduct, digging in down the stretch to beat Evening Attire by half a length. His next start was in the 1-mile Metropolitan Handicap where he finished fifth.

In June 2004, the New York Turf Writer's Association honoured Funny Cide with its Presidents' Award as the first New York-bred to win the Kentucky Derby and for how his Triple Crown bid captivated the nation. Jose Santos received the Red Smith "Good Guy" Award for his "grace under pressure" when dealing with a false accusation concerning his ride in the Kentucky Derby.

Funny Cide next started in the Massachusetts Handicap on July 3, 2004, earning a 110 Beyer Speed Figure. The finish was a three-way photo at the wire between runner-up Funny Cide, the winner Offlee Wild, and The Lady's Groom. He next ran in the Suburban Handicap, finishing third in another close finish behind old foe Peace Rules. Funny Cide then ran second behind Evening Attire in the Saratoga Breeders' Cup Handicap before a near record crowd of 70,175.

Coming into the Jockey Club Gold Cup, Funny Cide had only two wins in eight starts for the year, but was still co-favorite at 3–1 with Love of Money. The two battled for the lead for the first mile, then Funny Cide fell back as Newfoundland moved to the lead with Love of Money, and The Cliff's Edge came closing on the outside. Funny Cide appeared to be struggling, but fought back and began to gradually wear down Newfoundland, finally winning by three-quarters of a length. "I thought he was done," Tagg said. "Maybe he wanted to take a breather, I don't know... I was about ready to get sick then, but he came back running. He always does that. He never gives up. He always comes back running, even in some of his worst races." The Cliff's Edge was third and Evening Attire fourth, as Love of Money dropped out of contention. In the winner's circle, Funny Cide appeared exhausted by the effort. In the Gold Cup, he earned a 112 Beyer.

Funny Cide's last race of the year was a tenth-place finish in the Breeders' Cup Classic, held that year at Lone Star Park.

=== 2005–2007: four to six-year-old season ===
Since the middle of his three-year-old campaign, Funny Cide was beset with respiratory problems, perhaps aggravated by racing in the heat at the 2003 Breeders' Cup Classic at Santa Anita when a major forest fire raged nearby. Tagg would call him "fractious", later saying, "He had a lot of good qualities about him, but he was pretty difficult to train." During his five-year-old season he had back problems, undiagnosed until he had raced out of the money in the Pimlico Special, Brooklyn Handicap, and Suburban Handicap. Tagg decided to rest Funny Cide for the last half of the season.

Funny Cide returned to the track on January 7, 2006, in the six-furlong Gulfstream Park Handicap, finishing a disappointing seventh. On February 2, 2006, he finished second in a one-mile allowance race at Gulfstream, finishing behind Sir Greeley but ahead of odds-on favorite Sun King, winner of the Pennsylvania and Tampa Bay Derbies. Funny Cide's jockey for the race, Edgar Prado, said, "This was not his best distance but he was trying the whole way. He galloped out real strong. I think he's back, hopefully."

On April 1, he again finished second, this time in the Excelsior Breeders' Cup Handicap at Aqueduct. "He ran a fantastic race", new jockey Richard Migliore said. "Blood and guts all the way to the wire. He's a fantastic racehorse. I wasn't looking for the lead, but my horse was keen and I didn't want to get into a fight with him. When he got alone, he idled better and when company joined him, he fought on again. It was a very game performance."

Funny Cide with his hotwalker, Raunie Hart (who was there from the start)

On April 30, Funny Cide broke his losing streak by taking the Kings Point Handicap for state-breds at Aqueduct. Funny Cide took the early lead but dropped into second coming into the stretch. Migliore hit him with the stick, which Funny Cide resented. "I turned my stick over and hit him with it before he was ready," said Migliore. "I kind of took him out of his game. My little bit of worry almost cost us. I should have been more confident." He followed this with a third-place finish in the William Donald Schaefer Handicap at Pimlico.

On July 1, Funny Cide led all the way to win the Grade III $200,800, 1 1/4-mile Dominion Day Stakes at Woodbine Racetrack in Toronto, Canada. The race attracted many who had come just to see Funny Cide; they crowded the walking ring when he entered the paddock and gave him an ovation during the post parade. His 1 1/2-length win over a strong field brought the crowd to its feet. Funny Cide broke from the inside post and set a fast pace, then held off challenges from Cryptograph, who finished third and Nolan's Cat, who finished second. "I kind of figured we'd be on the lead," said Migliore. "I knew I had horse. When the challenge came, he met it. He likes to fight. As long as he can see them, they weren't going to beat him." Funny Cide was the first Derby winner to win at Woodbine since Secretariat took the Canadian International Stakes in 1973. He was also the first Kentucky Derby winner to win a graded stakes race at the age of six. He was also one of only two Kentucky Derby winners in 46 years to race at the age of six. (The other was Gato Del Sol, the 1982 winner.)

Funny Cide, foaled in Saratoga Springs, next ran in the Grade I Woodward Stakes at Saratoga on September 2, 2006. The field contained Sun King, the favorite after finishing second in the Whitney, the 2005 Travers winner Flower Alley, and Suave, who won the 2005 Saratoga Breeders' Cup Handicap. But Funny Cide was the star: the New York Thoroughbred Breeders gave out 10,000 Funny Cide posters to his fans. Unfortunately, Funny Cide was not up to the task and faded after chasing the pace while running wide, finishing eighth.

Funny Cide finished 2006 with two losses in the Brooklyn Breeders Cup Handicap and the Empire Cup Handicap. He was given some time off, then returned on April 29, 2007, in the Kings Point Handicap. He chased the pace three-wide but had no rally in the stretch and finished third. In the Wagon Limit Stakes for New York-breds, he went to the early lead but tired and again finished third.

On July 4, 2007, lured to Finger Lakes Race Track by an extra $50,000 added to the purse, Funny Cide took the $100,000 Wadsworth Memorial Handicap by three lengths under Alan Garcia, breaking his six-race winless streak. The track, which could accommodate 2,000 patrons in the clubhouse and another 4,000 in the grandstand, had an attendance of well over 11,000 people, its second-largest crowd since 1962. Funny Cide was only the second winner of a Triple Crown race to run at Finger Lakes in its 46-year history.

== Retirement ==
On July 13, 2007, Funny Cide's retirement was announced. "We decided that after the great fun and excitement of watching Funny Cide win the Wadsworth Memorial at Finger Lakes at the age of 7, it would be a good note on which to retire the horse," Tagg said. Jack Knowlton, managing partner for Sackatoga Stable, agreed that Funny Cide's future career would be at the track with Tagg. He became a stable pony in the mornings, accompanying younger horses in their training. "He'll still be doing what he's done the past five years, but he just won't be racing in the afternoon," Knowlton said.

NYRA (the New York Racing Association) held a "Funny Cide Retirement Party" at Saratoga on August 10, 2007.

On December 5, 2008, Funny Cide took up residence at the Kentucky Horse Park alongside Cigar, Da Hoss, and other champions. His work as Barclay Tagg's stable pony had begun to give him some discomfort. Shortly after Cigar's death in October 2014, Funny Cide was given his stall and paddock.

In August 2012, Funny Cide visited Saratoga's racetrack along with the retired jockey Richard Migliore and the trainer Nick Zito in a seminar for prospective racehorse owners. While there, he was a guest of Old Friends farm at Cabin Creek in Greenfield Center.

Funny Cide made several other racetrack appearances during retirement, most notably in August 2015 when he was shipped to Saratoga with American Pharoah. "He and (American Pharoah) were on the same flight with a pony (Smokey) of AP's, and it was just really neat to have a Triple Crown winner and a near-Triple Crown winner (together)," Knowlton said. "It was fun. I'd love for the pony to talk so we knew what those guys were talking about." Knowlton added, "People still adore him. They remember him and they love him. I have people all the time when I'm around racetracks (ask me), 'How's Funny Cide doing?' They don't know my name, but they know Funny Cide and they know I'm associated with him. I'm kind of the human side of Funny Cide."

== Death ==
Funny Cide died due to complications of colic on July 16, 2023, at the age of 23. He resided at the Kentucky Horse Park for the last 15 years of his life.

A portion of Funny Cide's ashes were buried behind the clubhouse of Saratoga Race Course on August 27, 2023. Portions of the remains are planned to be buried at McMahon of Saratoga Thoroughbred Farm and the Kentucky Horse Park.

== Honors ==
Funny Cide was a two-time "New York–bred Horse of the Year". He retired with 11 wins from 38 starts with six second-place finishes and eight thirds and earnings of $3,529,412. Funny Cide had the highest earnings of any New York-bred racehorse in history. Saratoga Race Course honored him with a stakes race for older New York-breds, the Funny Cide Stakes.

In April 2010, the New York Thoroughbred Breeders voted Funny Cide the New York-bred Horse of the Decade.

In August 2012, a statue of Funny Cide was unveiled in Saratoga Springs. On his saddle blanket is the number 6, his post position at Churchill Downs on the day he won the Kentucky Derby.

== Race record ==
| Date | Age | Distance | Race | Grade | Track | Odds | Field | Finish | Winning Time | Winning (Losing) Margin | Jockey | Ref |
|---|---|---|---|---|---|---|---|---|---|---|---|---|
| Sep 8, 2002 | 2 | 6 furlongs | Maiden Special Weight | Maiden | Belmont Park | *2.25 | 12 | 1 | 1:11.38 | 14 3/4 lengths | Jose Santos | |
| Sep 29, 2002 | 2 | 7 furlongs | Bertram F. Bongard Stakes | Black Type | Belmont Park | 2.95 | 10 | 1 | 1:22.95 | 9 lengths | Jose Santos | |
| Oct 19, 2002 | 2 | 1 mile | Sleepy Hollow Stakes | Black Type | Belmont Park | *0.20 | 6 | 1 | 1:36.76 | neck | Jose Santos | |
| Jan 18, 2003 | 3 | 1 1/16 miles | Holy Bull Stakes | III | Gulfstream Park | 5.30 | 13 | 5 | 1:43.00 | (6 1/2 lengths) | Jose Santos | |
| Mar 9, 2003 | 3 | 1 1/16 miles | Louisiana Derby | II | Fair Grounds Race Course (Louisiana) | 6.10 | 10 | 3 | 1:42.67 | (3 3/4 lengths) | Jose Santos | |
| Apr 12, 2003 | 3 | 1 1/8 miles | Wood Memorial Stakes | I | Aqueduct | 5.20 | 8 | 2 | 1:48.70 | (1/2 length) | Jose Santos | |
| May 3, 2003 | 3 | 1 1/4 miles | Kentucky Derby | I | Churchill Downs | 12.80 | 16 | 1 | 2:01.19 | 1 3/4 lengths | Jose Santos | |
| May 17, 2003 | 3 | 1 3/16 miles | Preakness Stakes | I | Pimlico Race Course | *1.90 | 10 | 1 | 1:55.61 | 9 3/4 lengths | Jose Santos | |
| Jun 7, 2003 | 3 | 1 1/2 miles | Belmont Stakes | I | Belmont Park | *1.00 | 6 | 3 | 2:28.26 | (5 lengths) | Jose Santos | |
| Aug 3, 2003 | 3 | 1 1/8 miles | Haskell Invitational Handicap | I | Monmouth Park | *1.00 | 7 | 3 | 1:49.77 | (9 lengths) | Jose Santos | |
| Oct 25, 2003 | 3 | 1 1/4 miles | Breeders' Cup Classic | I | Santa Anita Park | 8.70 | 10 | 9 | 1:59.88 | (12 lengths) | Julie Krone | |
| Jan 10, 2004 | 4 | 7 furlongs | Allowance Optional Claiming | Claiming | Gulfstream Park | *0.40 | 5 | 1 | 1:22.83 | 5 lengths | Jose Santos | |
| Feb 7, 2004 | 4 | 1 1/8 miles | Donn Handicap | I | Gulfstream Park | 3.00 | 8 | 3 | 1:47.68 | (8 1/2 lengths) | Jose Santos | |
| Feb 29, 2004 | 4 | 1 1/8 miles | New Orleans Handicap | II | Fair Grounds Race Course (Louisiana) | 5.40 | 8 | 3 | 1:48.61 | (3 lengths) | Jose Santos | |
| Apr 3, 2004 | 4 | 1 1/8 miles | Excelsior Breeders' Cup Handicap | III | Aqueduct | *1.30 | 5 | 1 | 1:49.57 | 1/2 length | Jose Santos | |
| May 31, 2004 | 4 | 1 mile | Metropolitan Handicap | I | Belmont Park | 4.20 | 9 | 5 | 1:35.47 | (5 1/4 lengths) | Jose Santos | |
| Jun 19, 2004 | 4 | 1 1/8 miles | Massachusetts Handicap | II | Suffolk Downs | *2.10 | 9 | 2 | 1:49.14 | (head) | Jose Santos | |
| Jul 3, 2004 | 4 | 1 1/4 miles | Suburban Handicap | I | Belmont Park | 4.10 | 8 | 3 | 1:59.52 | (1/2 length) | Jose Santos | |
| Aug 22, 2004 | 4 | 1 1/4 miles | Saratoga Breeders' Cup Handicap | II | Saratoga | *1.00 | 7 | 2 | 2:00.83 | (5 lengths) | Edgar Prado | |
| Oct 2, 2004 | 4 | 1 1/4 miles | Jockey Club Gold Cup | I | Belmont Park | *2.80 | 7 | 1 | 2:02.44 | 3/4 length | Jose Santos | |
| Oct 30, 2004 | 4 | 1 1/4 miles | Breeders' Cup Classic | I | Lone Star Park | 7.70 | 13 | 10 | 1:59.02 | (14 1/4 lengths) | Jose Santos | |
| May 20, 2005 | 5 | 1 3/16 miles | Pimlico Special Handicap | I | Pimlico | 3.80 | 7 | 4 | 1:58.05 | (7 1/2 lengths | Jose Santos | |
| Jun 11, 2005 | 5 | 1 1/8 miles | Brooklyn Handicap | II | Belmont Park | 2.55 | 9 | 5 | 1:46.69 | (10 1/2 lengths | Jose Santos | |
| Jul 2, 2005 | 5 | 1 1/4 miles | Suburban Handicap | I | Belmont Park | 2.95 | 8 | 6 | 2:00.50 | (19 1/4 lengths) | Jose Santos | |
| Jan 7, 2006 | 6 | 6 furlongs | Mr. Prospector Handicap | III | Gulfstream Park | 6.00 | 8 | 7 | 1:08.50 | (11 lengths) | Edgar Prado | |
| Feb 2, 2006 | 6 | 1 mile | Allowance Optional Claiming | Claiming | Gulfstream Park | 4.60 | 6 | 2 | 1:34.42 | (1 1/2 lengths | Edgar Prado | |
| Mar 4, 2006 | 6 | 1 3/16 miles | Gulfstream Park Handicap | II | Gulfstream Park | 4.80 | 8 | 7 | 2:02.44 | (10 1/4 lengths) | Edgar Prado | |
| Apr 1, 2006 | 6 | 1 1/8 miles | Excelsior Breeders' Cup Handicap | III | Aqueduct | 4.50 | 9 | 2 | 1:48.28 | (1 3/4 lengths) | Richard Migliore | |
| Apr 30, 2006 | 6 | 1 1/8 miles | Kings Point Handicap | Black Type | Aqueduct | *0.60 | 4 | 1 | 2:02.44 | 3/4 length | Richard Migliore | |
| May 20, 2006 | 6 | 1 1/8 miles | William Donald Schaefer Handicap | III | Pimlico | 1.60 | 6 | 3 | 1:49.42 | (7 1/2 lengths) | Richard Migliore | |
| Jul 1, 2006 | 6 | 1 1/4 miles | Dominion Day Stakes | III | Woodbine | *1.60 | 7 | 1 | 2:02.41 | 1 1/2 lengths | Richard Migliore | |
| Sep 2, 2006 | 6 | 1 1/8 miles | Woodward Stakes | I | Saratoga | 12.00 | 10 | 8 | 1:50.65 | (12 lengths) | Richard Migliore | |
| Sep 16, 2006 | 6 | 1 1/8 miles | Brooklyn Breeders' Cup Handicap | II | Belmont Park | 7.30 | 6 | 4 | 1:47.94 | (5 3/4 lengths) | Cornelio Velasquez | |
| Oct 21, 2006 | 6 | 1 1/8 miles | Empire Classic Handicap | Black Type | Belmont Park | 4.70 | 8 | 4 | 1:49.45 | (1 1/2 lengths) | Cornelio Velasquez | |
| Apr 6, 2007 | 7 | 1 1/16 miles | Allowance Optional Claiming | Claiming | Keeneland | 4.90 | 9 | 7 | 1:41.94 | (12 1/4 lengths) | Cornelio Velasquez | |
| Apr 29, 2007 | 7 | 1 1/8 miles | Kings Point Handicap | Black Type | Aqueduct | 4.50 | 5 | 3 | 1:48.41 | (6 1/2 lengths) | Cornelio Velasquez | |
| May 18, 2007 | 7 | 1 1/2 miles | Wagon Limit Stakes | Black Type | Belmont Park | 3.60 | 7 | 3 | 2:31.29 | (7 1/2 lengths) | Cornelio Velasquez | |
| Jul 4, 2007 | 7 | 1 1/8 miles | Wadsworth Memorial Handicap | Listed | Finger Lakes | 1.00 | 8 | 1 | 1:51.77 | 3 lengths | Alan Garcia | |

== Pedigree ==
Pedigree of Funny Cide, chestnut gelding, 2000
| Sire Distorted Humor chestnut 1993 | Forty Niner chestnut 1985 | Mr. Prospector | Raise A Native |
| Sire Distorted Humor chestnut 1993 | Forty Niner chestnut 1985 | Mr. Prospector | Gold Digger |
| Sire Distorted Humor chestnut 1993 | Forty Niner chestnut 1985 | File | Tom Rolfe |
| Sire Distorted Humor chestnut 1993 | Forty Niner chestnut 1985 | File | Continue |
| Sire Distorted Humor chestnut 1993 | Danzig's Beauty bay 1987 | Danzig | Northern Dancer |
| Sire Distorted Humor chestnut 1993 | Danzig's Beauty bay 1987 | Danzig | Pas De Nom |
| Sire Distorted Humor chestnut 1993 | Danzig's Beauty bay 1987 | Sweetest Chant | Mr. Leader |
| Sire Distorted Humor chestnut 1993 | Danzig's Beauty bay 1987 | Sweetest Chant | Gay Sonnet |
| Dam Belle's Good Cide chestnut 1993 | Slewacide bay 1980 | Seattle Slew | Bold Reasoning |
| Dam Belle's Good Cide chestnut 1993 | Slewacide bay 1980 | Seattle Slew | My Charmer |
| Dam Belle's Good Cide chestnut 1993 | Slewacide bay 1980 | Evasive | Buckpasser |
| Dam Belle's Good Cide chestnut 1993 | Slewacide bay 1980 | Evasive | Summer Scandal |
| Dam Belle's Good Cide chestnut 1993 | Belle of Killarney chestnut 1981 | Little Current | Sea-Bird |
| Dam Belle's Good Cide chestnut 1993 | Belle of Killarney chestnut 1981 | Little Current | Luiana |
| Dam Belle's Good Cide chestnut 1993 | Belle of Killarney chestnut 1981 | Cherished Moment | Graustark |
| Dam Belle's Good Cide chestnut 1993 | Belle of Killarney chestnut 1981 | Cherished Moment | Pumpkin Patch (family 6-d) |

== In popular culture ==
In 2006, Funny Cide appeared in a children's book about his life called, A Horse Named Funny Cide, written by The Funny Cide Team and illustrated by Barry Moser.

== See also ==
- List of racehorses
