= Empire Maker =

American-bred Thoroughbred racehorse

- Sire: Unbridled
- Grandsire: Fappiano
- Dam: Toussaud
- Damsire: El Gran Senor
- Sex: Stallion
- Foaled: April 27, 2000
- Country: United States
- Colour: Dark Bay
- Breeder: Juddmonte Farms
- Owner: Juddmonte Farms
- Trainer: Robert J. Frankel
- Record: 8: 4-3-1
- Earnings: $1,985,800

Major wins
- Florida Derby (2003); Wood Memorial Stakes (2003); Triple Crown race wins: Belmont Stakes (2003)
- Last updated on August 23, 2007

Empire Maker (April 27, 2000 - January 18, 2020) was an American Thoroughbred racehorse who won the 2003 Belmont Stakes and is the grandsire of the 2015 Triple Crown winner American Pharoah.

== Background ==
Owned and bred by Prince Khalid Abdullah's Juddmonte Farms, Empire Maker was sired by champion Unbridled, winner of the 1990 Kentucky Derby and Breeders' Cup Classic. Empire Maker's dam, Toussaud, was the daughter of British champion and Classic Race winner El Gran Senor, who in turn was a son of the great Northern Dancer. Toussaud was a multiple stakes winner in England and a Blue Hen broodmare who would produce five Grade I winners (including Chester House) from five different stallions.

== Racing career ==
=== 2002: two-year-old season ===
At age two, Empire Maker made two starts, winning his maiden debut in October 2002 at Belmont Park then taking third in the Remsen Stakes, some 5½ lengths back of the winner Toccet. As a three-year-old, he would make six starts, winning three and finishing second three times.

=== 2003: three-year-old season ===
In February 2003, Empire Maker began his three-year-old season with a second-place finish in the Sham Stakes at Santa Anita Park in California. For his next start, trainer Bobby Frankel put blinkers on the colt in an effort to make him concentrate and he responded with a nine and three quarter length win in the Grade I Florida Derby. He followed this up with another important win in the Grade I Wood Memorial Stakes. These two performances resulted in Empire Maker being made the solid betting favorite in the 2003 Kentucky Derby.

Under his regular rider, the U.S. Racing Hall of Fame jockey, Jerry Bailey, Empire Maker ran second in the Kentucky Derby to Funny Cide whom he had beaten by a half-length in the Wood Memorial. Trainer Bobby Frankel believed that if he did not go light on Empire Maker's training before the Derby because of his feet issues, then Empire Maker would have won the Derby. His handlers then chose to rest the colt and did not run him in the Preakness Stakes, the second leg of the U.S. Triple Crown series, which has become a common racing tactic when a horse does not win the first leg. Funny Cide won the Preakness Stakes by more than nine lengths and headed to New York's Belmont Park favored to become the first Triple Crown champion in twenty-five years.

Heavy rains left the racetrack at Belmont Park officially rated as sloppy for the 2003 Belmont Stakes. In an attempt to control the pace, Funny Cide's handlers changed his racing tactics and he took the lead early. Empire Maker was running a length back to the outside when at the mile mark, jockey Jerry Bailey made his move. The fresh Empire Maker won the race with Ten Most Wanted a strong second and Funny Cide finishing third, more than five lengths back.

In what would be Empire Maker's final race, as a 3-10 favorite he ran second by a neck in the Jim Dandy Stakes at Saratoga Race Course.

== Stud career ==
Empire Maker was retired to stand at stud beginning in 2004 at his owner's Juddmonte Farms in Lexington, Kentucky. His American-bred offspring include Bodemeister and Royal Delta. Through Pioneerof the Nile, he is the grand-sire of American Pharoah, 2015 U.S. Triple Crown winner. Through Bodemeister he is the grandsire of 2017 Kentucky Derby winner Always Dreaming.

In November 2010 Empire Maker was sold to the Japan Bloodhorse Breeders' Association and stood at the Shizunai Stallion Station. In September 2015, it was announced that Empire Maker would be returning to the U.S. to stand at Gainesway Farm in 2016. Gainesway announced in October that Empire Maker's 2016 stud fee would be $100,000. In 2019 it was $85,000.

Empire Maker died at 20-years-old on January 18, 2020, due to a rare disease that compromised his immune system.

=== Notable progeny ===
Empire Maker sired 12 individual Grade 1 winners:

c = colt, f = filly, g = gelding

Foaled	Name	Sex	Major wins
2005	Acoma	f	Spinster Stakes
2005	Country Star	f	Alcibiades Stakes, Hollywood Starlet Stakes
2005	Icon Project	f	Personal Ensign Stakes
2005	Mushka	f	Spinster Stakes
2006	Pioneerof the Nile	c	Cash Call Futurity, Santa Anita Derby
2008	Last Full Measure	f	Madison Stakes
2008	Royal Delta	f	Alabama Stakes, Breeders' Cup Ladies' Classic x 2, Beldame Stakes, Delaware Handicap, Personal Ensign Handicap
2009	Bodemeister	c	Arkansas Derby
2009	Grace Hall	f	Spinaway Stakes
2009	In Lingerie	f	Spinster Stakes
2010	Emollient	f	Ashland Stakes, American Oaks, Spinster Stakes, Rodeo Drive Stakes
2013	Empire Pegasus	c	Seiran Sho
2017	Eight Rings	c	American Pharoah Stakes
