= 2003 Kentucky Derby =

Horse race

129th Kentucky Derby
- Kentucky Derby
- Location: Churchill Downs
- Date: May 3, 2003
- Winning horse: Funny Cide
- Winning time: 2:01.19
- Starting price: 13:1
- Jockey: José A. Santos
- Trainer: Barclay Tagg
- Owner: Sackatoga Stable
- Conditions: Fast
- Surface: Dirt
- Attendance: 148,530

The 2003 Kentucky Derby was the 129th running of the Kentucky Derby. The race took place on May 3, 2003, and was won by longshot Funny Cide. There were 148,530 in attendance.

== Contenders ==
Sportswriter Steve Haskin called the 2003 Derby contenders a "perplexing group". The horses with the best form at age two (Vindication, Toccet, and Sky Mesa) all got injured while preparing for the Derby and ultimately missed the race. Instead, later developing colts dominated the final major preps in March and April. The clear favorite was Empire Maker, who had won both the Florida Derby and Wood Memorial. Empire Maker was at 6:5 on the morning line but drifted out to 5:2 by post-time based on concerns about a bruise to his right front hoof in the final days of training. Peace Rules was the second choice at odds of 6:1 after winning the Louisiana Derby and Blue Grass Stakes. Both horses were trained by Bobby Frankel, a Hall of Fame inductee who had never won a Triple Crown event. Other leading contenders included Buddy Gil (Santa Anita Derby), Ten Most Wanted (Illinois Derby), and Scrimshaw (Lexington Stakes).

Funny Cide was a moderate longshot at odds of 13:1. Bred in New York, Funny Cide won all three starts at age two in restricted stakes company and was named the New York bred champion two-year-old colt or gelding. When moved to open stakes company at age three, he ran fifth in the Holy Bull Stakes to Offlee Wild, second to Peace Rules in the Louisiana Derby and second to Empire Maker in the Wood Memorial.

Sir Cherokee was originally entered but was scratched by the track veterinarian.

== Full results ==
Brancusi, Peace Rules and Eye of the Tiger went to the early lead and set moderately-fast fractions of 22.78 seconds for the first quarter mile and 46.23 for the first half. Funny Cide was bumped at the start but moved into tracking position going around the first turn while Empire Maker rated in eighth place. Peace Rules went to the lead on the far turn while Funny Cide moved into second and Empire Maker into third. Turning into the stretch, jockey José A. Santos went to the whip and Funny Cide opened a clear lead, then held on to win by 1 3/4 lengths. Empire Maker finished a head in front of stablemate Peace Rules for second. The time of 2:01.19 was the 10th fastest running in Derby history.

The race set a number of firsts. Funny Cide was the first gelding to win the race since Clyde Van Dusen in 1929. It was the first time a New York-bred had won the Kentucky Derby. It was the first win for Santos in seven attempts, and the first for trainer Barclay Tagg. It was also the first major win for Funny Cide's owners, six friends from upper New York state who named their outfit Sackatoga Stable after their hometown Sackett's Harbor and favorite racetrack, Saratoga. "We are a three-horse stable", said one of the partners, Jackson Knowlton. "We are the little guys in the game. Everyone who dreams in this game, who owns two or five horses, look at what you can accomplish. Little did we know."

Finish	Program number	Horse	Jockey	Trainer	Odds	Margin	Earnings
1	6	Funny Cide	José A. Santos	Barclay Tagg	12.80		$800,200
2	12	Empire Maker	Jerry Bailey	Robert J. Frankel	2.50	1 3/4 lengths	$170,000
3	5	Peace Rules	Edgar Prado	Robert J. Frankel	6.30	1 3/4 lengths	$85,000
4	4	Atswhatimtalknbout	David R. Flores	Ronald W. Ellis	8.90	2 lengths	$45,000
5	13	Eye of the Tiger	Eibar Coa	Jerry Hollendorfer	41.50	4 3/4 lengths	
6	8	Buddy Gil	Gary Stevens	Jeff Mullins	7.20	5 3/4 lengths	
7	15	Outta Here	Kent Desormeaux	William Currin	39.70	6 1/2 lengths	
8	14	Ten Cents a Shine	Calvin Borel	D. Wayne Lukas	37.20	7 1/2 lengths	
9	16	Ten Most Wanted	Pat Day	Wallace Dollase	6.60	7 3/4 lengths	
10	11	Domestic Dispute	Alex Solis	Patrick Gallagher	44.00	9 1/2 lengths	
11	17	Scrimshaw	Cornelio Velásquez	D. Wayne Lukas	16.50	10 1/2 lengths	
12	7	Offlee Wild	Robby Albarado	Thomas Smith	29.90	11 1/2 lengths	
13	1	Supah Blitz	Rosemary Homeister Jr.	Emanuel Tortora	43.10	17 lengths	
14	9	Indian Express	Tyler Baze	Bob Baffert	10.80	18 3/4 lengths	
15	10	Lone Star Sky	Shane Sellers	Thomas M. Amoss	52.10	20 lengths	
16	2	Brancusi	Tony Farina	Patrick Biancone	29.30	21 lengths	

Track condition: Fast

Times: 1/4 mile – 22.78; 1/2 mile – 46.23; 3/4 mile – 1:10.48; mile – 1:35.75; final – 2:01.19.
Splits for each quarter-mile: (22.78) (23.45) (24.25) (25.27) (25.44)

Source: Equibase Chart

== Payout ==
The 129th Kentucky Derby Payout Schedule

Program Number	Horse Name	Win	Place	Show
6	Funny Cide	US$27.60	$12.40	$8.20
12	Empire Maker	-	$5.80	$4.40
5	Peace Rules	-	-	$6.00

- $2 Exacta: (6-12) Paid $97.00
- $2 Trifecta: (6-12-5) Paid $664.80
- $1 Superfecta: (6-12-5-4) Paid $2,795.80

== Controversy ==
On the Thursday after the race, the Miami Herald published a photo that supposedly showed Santos holding a "buzzer" (a device that administers an electric shock to horses, intended to make them run faster). The story became national news and prompted a meeting of the Churchill Downs' stewards. In the photo, there was a dark area between Santos' hand and the whip. The Associated Press subsequently published another photo that clearly showed Santos held no such device: the dark area in the original photo may have been the green silks of the runner-up Empire Maker. Santos was officially cleared a few days later. "I'm thankful this nightmare is over", he said. "A week ago was the happiest moment of my life, and then this photograph came along and nearly ruined my life."

== Subsequent racing careers ==
Several horses went on to record Grade I wins after the Derby:

- Funny Cide – Preakness Stakes, 2004 Jockey Club Gold Cup
- Empire Maker – Belmont Stakes
- Peace Rules – Haskell Invitational, 2004 Suburban Handicap
- Ten Most Wanted – Travers Stakes
- Offlee Wild – 2005 Suburban Handicap

== Subsequent breeding careers ==
Leading progeny of participants in the 2003 Kentucky Derby

Empire Maker

- Royal Delta – 2011 Breeders' Cup Ladies Classic, Alabama Stakes, 2012 Breeders' Cup Ladies Classic, Beldame Stakes, 2013 Delaware Handicap, Personal Ensign
- Pioneerof the Nile – 2009 Santa Anita Derby, 2nd in Kentucky Derby, 2008 CashCall Futurity
- Bodemeister – 2012 Arkansas Derby, 2nd in both Kentucky Derby and Preakness Stakes
- Emollient – 2013 Ashland Stakes, American Oaks, Spinster Stakes, 2014 Rodeo Drive Stakes
- Grace Hall – Spinaway Stakes

Offlee Wild

- Bayern – 2014 Breeders' Cup Classic, Haskell Invitational
- She Be Wild – 2009 Breeders' Cup Juvenile Fillies
