= Barclay Tagg =

American Thoroughbred trainer (born 1937)

Personal information
- Born: December 30, 1937 (age 88) Lancaster, Pennsylvania, United States
- Occupation: Horse trainer

Horse racing career
- Sport: Horse racing
- Career wins: 1,514+ (ongoing)

Major racing wins
- Dahlia Stakes (USA) (1985, 1987); Black Helen Handicap (1992); Pennsylvania Governor's Cup Handicap (1992); Royal Palm Handicap (1994); Alabama Stakes (2003); Jockey Club Gold Cup (2004); Coolmore Lexington Stakes (2006); Colonial Turf Cup (2006); Secretariat Stakes (2006); Jamaica Breeders' Cup Handicap (2006); Hollywood Derby (2006); Remsen Stakes (2006); Cornhusker Handicap (2007); Holy Bull Stakes (2007); Wood Memorial Stakes (2007, 2008); Red Smith Handicap (2007); Mrs. Revere Stakes (2007); Queen Elizabeth II Challenge Cup Stakes (2007); Futurity Stakes (2007); U.S. Racing Hall of Fame Stakes (2007); Kent Breeders' Cup Stakes (2007); Jamaica Handicap (2007); Tampa Bay Derby (2008); Suburban Handicap (2009); Cigar Mile Handicap; Beaugay Stakes (1999, 2009) (2010); Kelso Handicap (2012); Appalachian Stakes (2013); Lake Placid Stakes (2013); Comely Stakes (2016); Florida Derby (2020); Travers Stakes (2020) American Classics; Kentucky Derby (2003); Preakness Stakes (2003); Belmont Stakes (2020)

Significant horses
- Funny Cide, Nobiz Like Shobiz, Showing Up, Big Truck, Tale of Ekati, Tiz the Law
- Updated on November 27, 2010

Barclay Tagg (born December 30, 1937, in Lancaster, Pennsylvania) is an American Thoroughbred horse trainer. Tagg graduated from Pennsylvania State University with a degree in Animal Husbandry in 1961. Tagg is best known for conditioning Kentucky Derby, Preakness Stakes, and Jockey Club Gold Cup winner Funny Cide. Horses in Tagg's stable have included Tiz the Law, Showing Up, and Nobiz Like Shobiz.

Formerly a steeplechase jockey, Tagg won his first race in 1972 at Old Liberty Park. He has been a journeyman trainer for many years and with Funny Cide became the first trainer to win the Kentucky Derby in his first attempt since Cam Gambolati with Spend a Buck in 1985. He won the 2020 Belmont Stakes with New York-bred Tiz the Law
