= San Lazaro Tourism and Business Park =

Mixed-use development in Manila, Philippines

Coordinates: 14°37′10″N 120°59′10″E

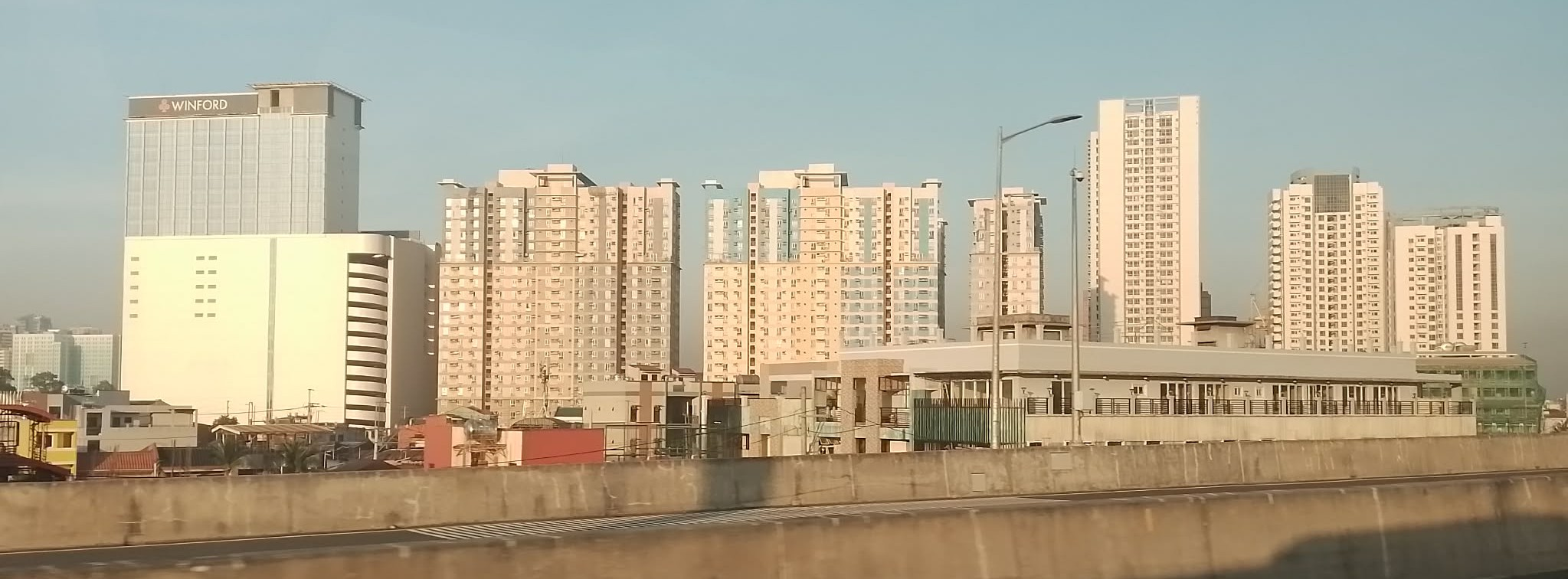
- The development as seen from NLEX Connector (2026)

Project
- Opening date: 2001
- Developer: Manila Jockey Club Investments Corp.
- Owner: Manila Jockey Club Investments Corp.
- Website: MJC Investments Corp.

Location
- Interactive map of San Lazaro Tourism and Business Park
- Location: Santa Cruz, Manila, Philippines

San Lazaro Tourism and Business Park is a 16-hectare (40-acre) mixed-used development by the Manila Jockey Club Investments Corp. in Manila, Philippines. It takes its name from the old San Lazaro Hippodrome, a horse racetrack that stood on the site from circa 1900 to 2003. Currently, the site includes the SM City San Lazaro shopping center, the two-tower Vertex office complex, the three-tower Celadon Park and Celadon Residences, and the five-tower Avida Towers San Lazaro condominium complex. It has been declared a tourism economic zone with information technology component in 2009.

== Location ==
San Lazaro is located in the northern portion of Manila within the city district of Santa Cruz between the University Belt area and the Manila North Cemetery. It is bounded by Tayuman Street and Consuelo Street on the south, the Philippine National Railways (PNR) line and NLEX Connector on Antipolo Street on the north, Elias Street to the east, and Felix Huertas Road to the west which runs parallel to Rizal Avenue. The site is close to major Manila landmarks such as the University of Santo Tomas, the Archdiocesan Shrine of Espiritu Santo, the Manila Chinese Cemetery, and the San Lazaro compound which houses the Department of Health head office, Hospital de San Lazaro and José R. Reyes Memorial Medical Center.

== History ==
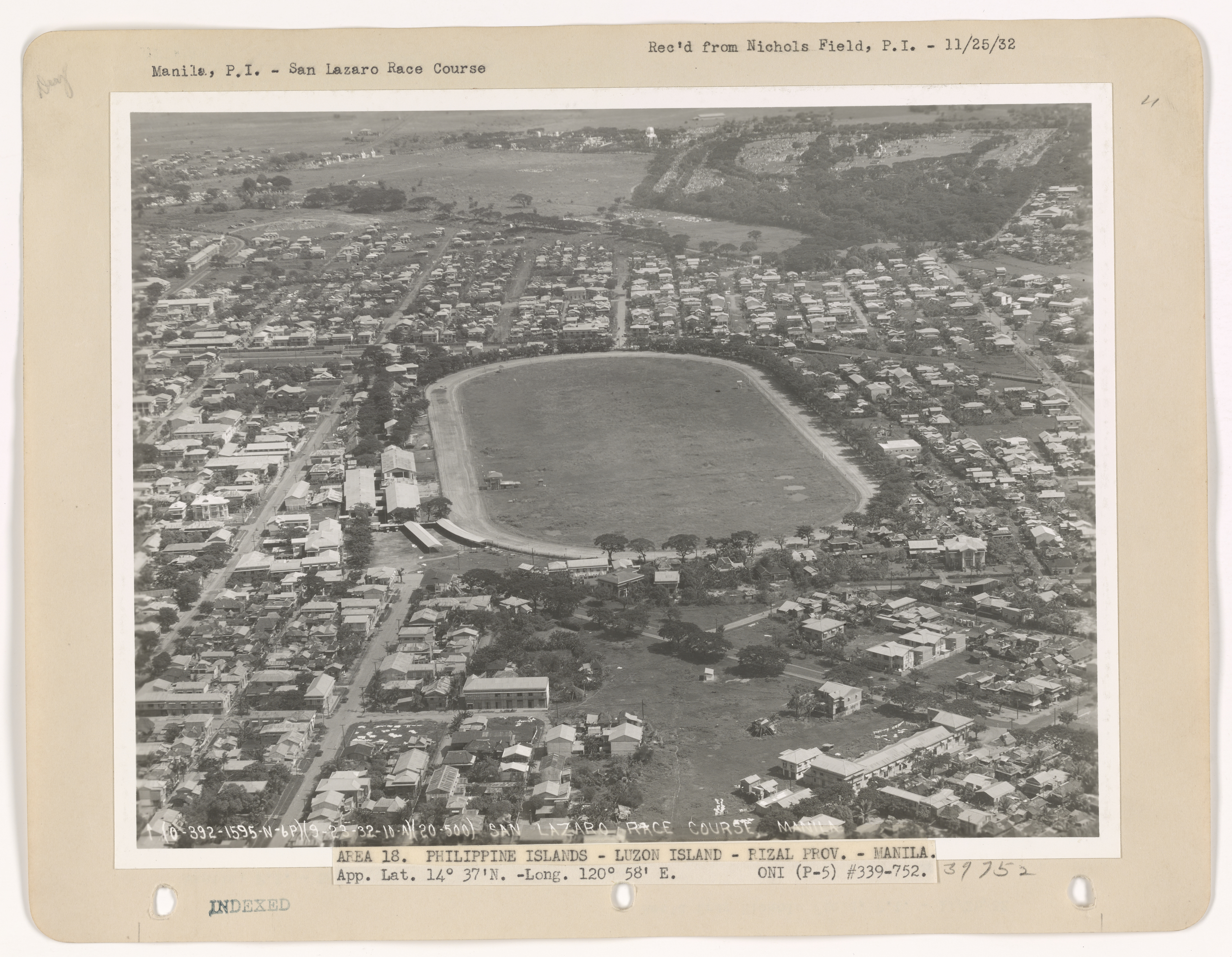
Aerial view of the San Lazaro Hippodrome, 1932

The land the development sits on was the site of the San Lazaro Hippodrome, home of the Manila Jockey Club, the first racing club in Southeast Asia established in 1867. It was built circa 1900 on the 400-hectare (990-acre) former friar estate known in the Spanish colonial period as Hacienda de Mayhaligue. It later came to be called Hacienda de San Lázaro being home of the Hospital de San Lázaro, the leprosarium administered by the Franciscan religious order since 1785. The site itself was the location of the Monasterio de Santa Clara which the Manila Jockey Club purchased in the early days of the American colonial period in 1900. Prior to the construction of the hippodrome at San Lazaro, the club held its races at the Santa Mesa Hippodrome in Santa Mesa.

In 2001, the Manila Jockey Club entered into a joint venture agreement with SM Prime Holdings for conversion of 4 hectares (9.9 acres) of property into a shopping mall. It also signed a venture with Ayala Land for office and residential development in the property in 2007. The racing club moved to its new location at the San Lazaro Leisure Park in Carmona, Cavite in 2003.

== Winford Hotel and Casino ==
Winford Hotel and Casino (formerly Winford Leisure and Entertainment Complex) is an ₱8 billion hotel-casino that opened in January 2016. It is anchored on a 22-story five-star hotel building with 128 all-suite rooms and close to 1 hectare (2.5 acres) of casino floor. The casino is operated by the Philippine Amusement and Gaming Corporation (PAGCOR) under the terms of the license issued to Manila Jockey Club in 2009. The complex also contains facilities for meetings and events targeted to the affluent Filipino Chinese community in the area of Central Manila.

== Transportation ==
San Lazaro is near major transportation arteries. It is accessible from downtown Manila via Rizal Avenue (Radial Road 9) and Lacson Avenue (Circumferential Road 2). It is served by both the Tayuman Station and Blumentritt Station of the Manila Light Rail Transit System Line 1 and the Blumentritt railway station of PNR.

== Gallery ==
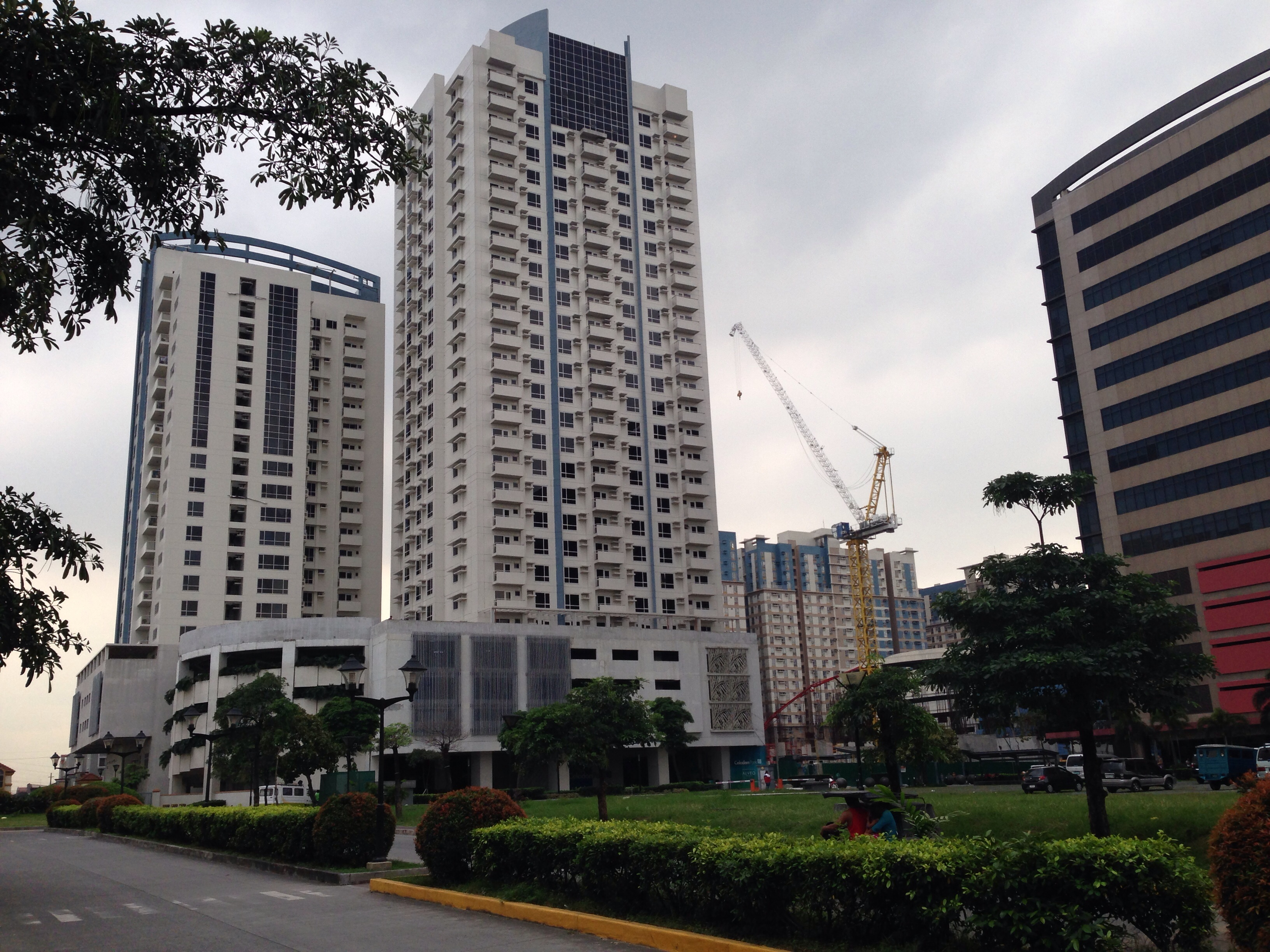
The Celadon and Vertex One

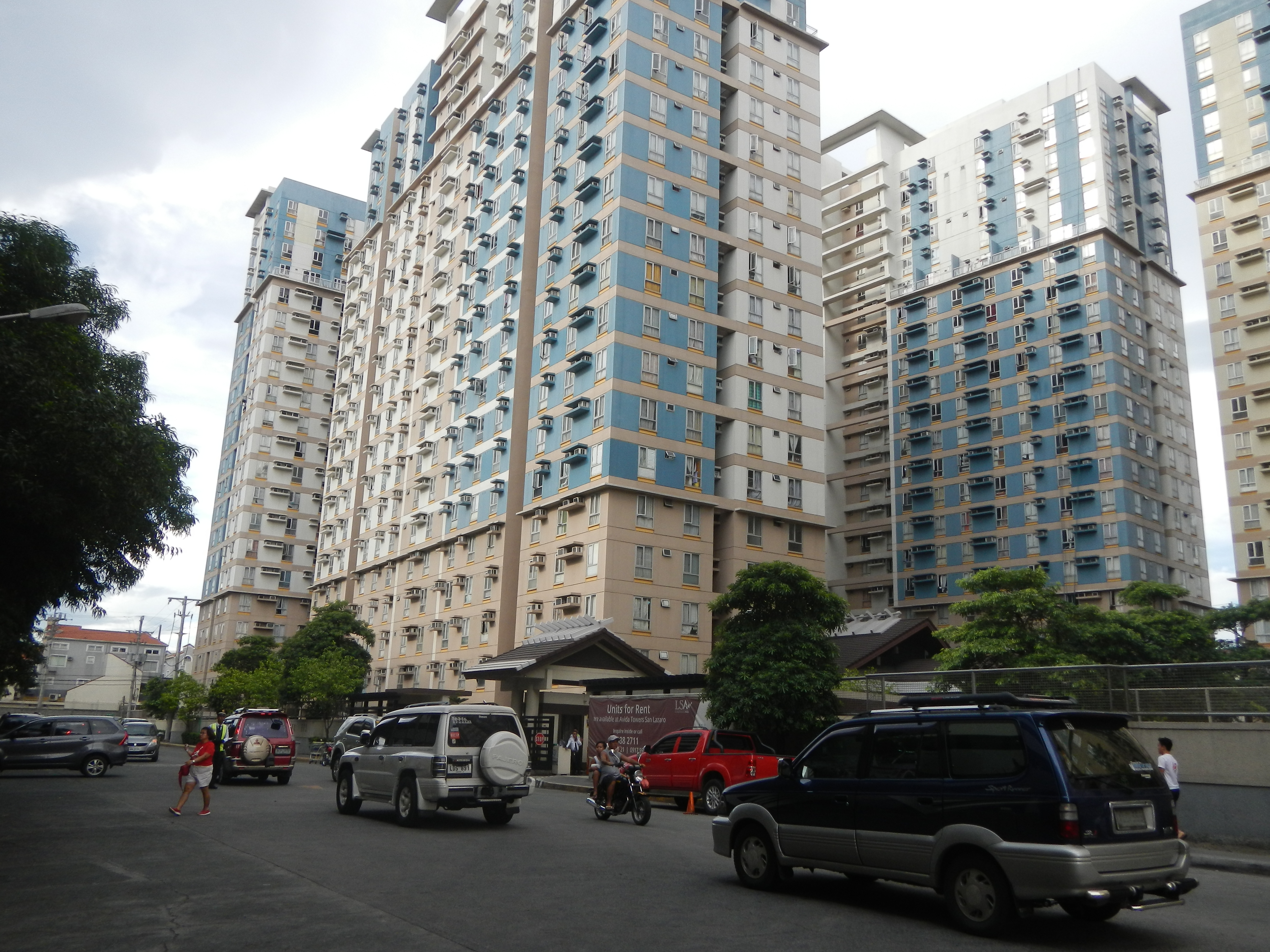
Avida Towers San Lazaro

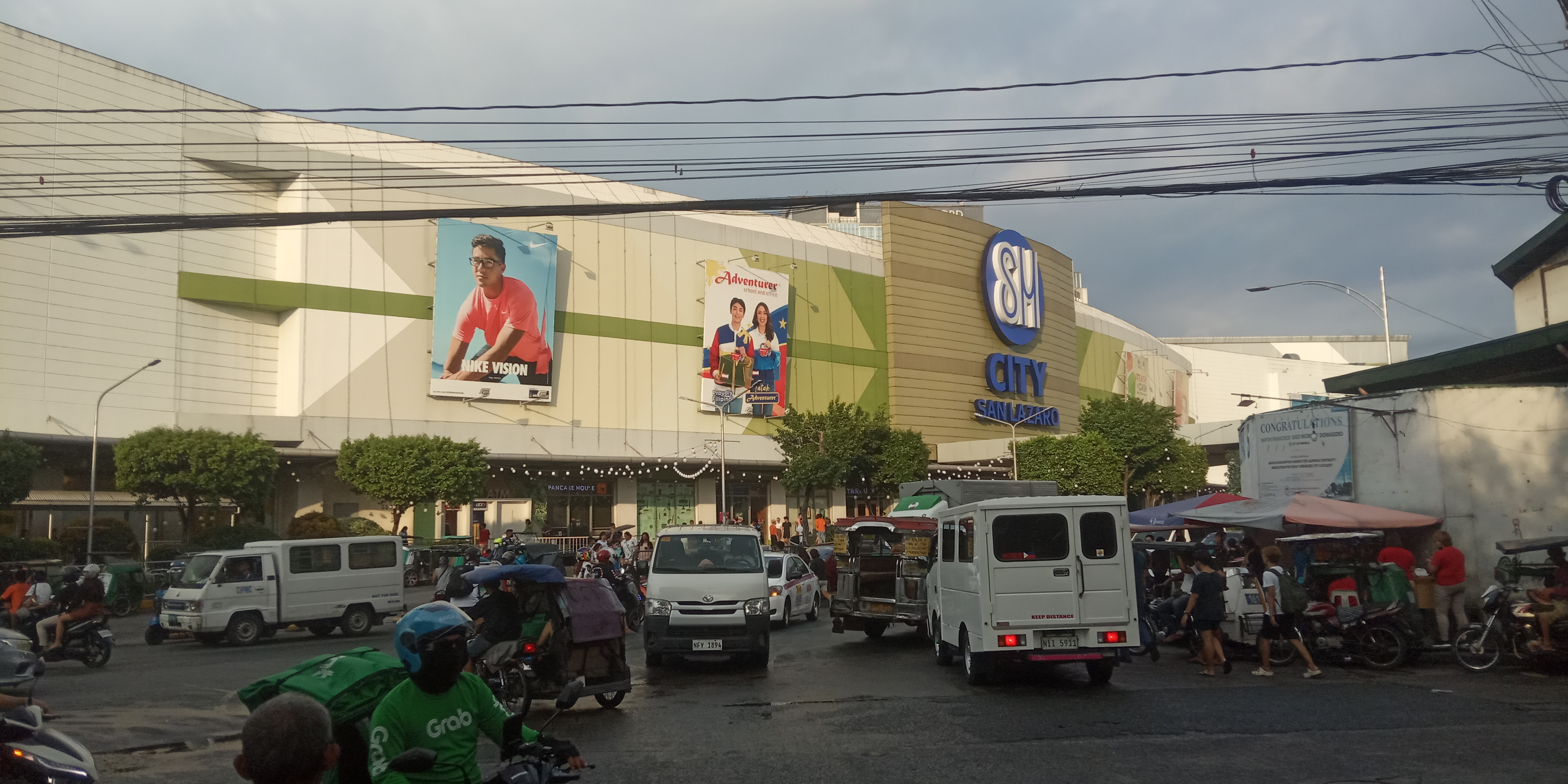
SM City San Lazaro

== See also ==
- Circuit Makati
- Media related to San Lazaro Tourism and Business Park at Wikimedia Commons
