= San Lazaro Hippodrome =

Horse racing venue in Manila, Philippines

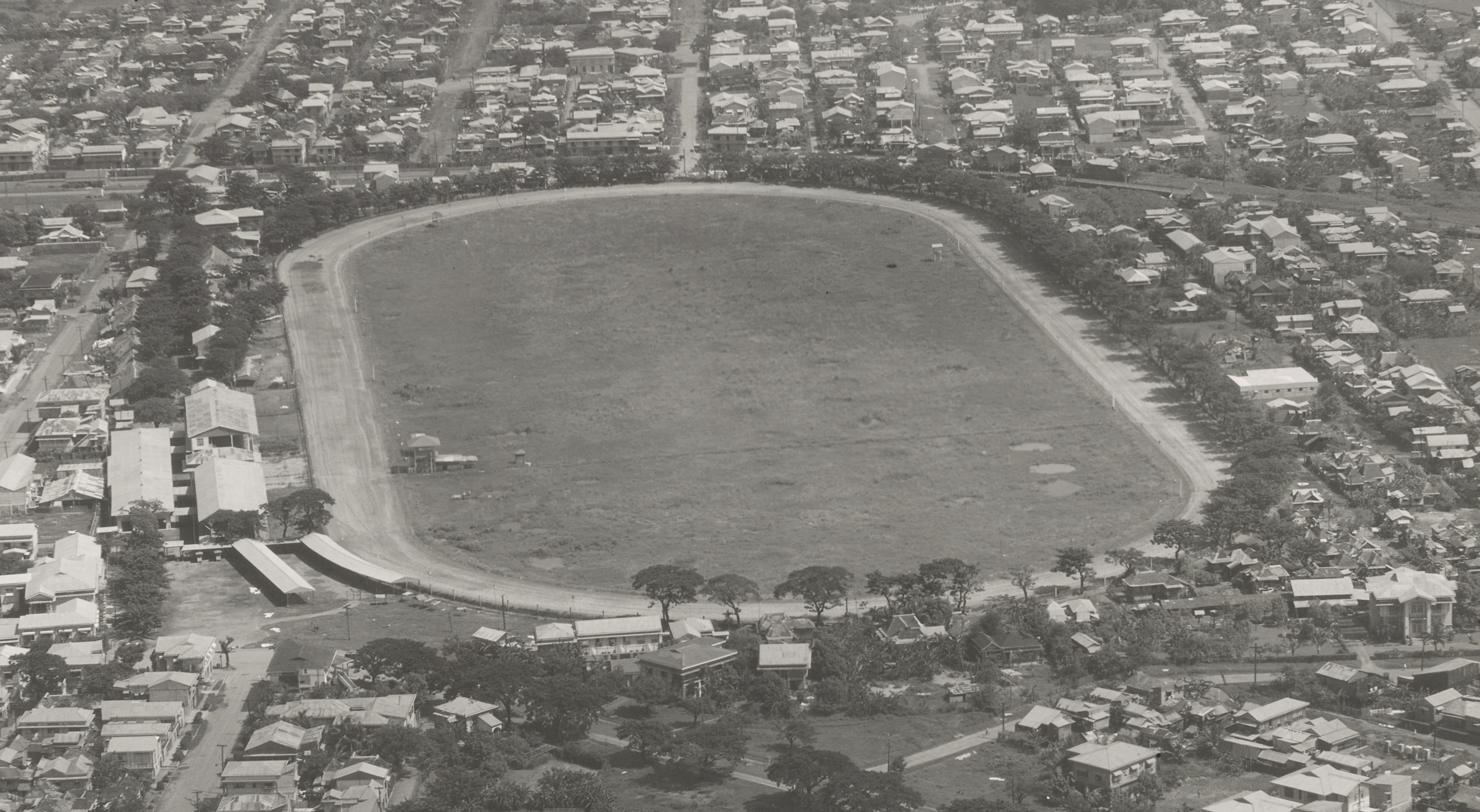
- San Lazaro Hippodrome in 1932
- Interactive map of San Lazaro Hippodrome
- Location: Santa Cruz, Manila, Philippines
- Owned by: Manila Jockey Club
- Operated by: Manila Jockey Club
- Date opened: 1912
- Date closed: 2002
- Notable races: Presidential Gold Cup

The San Lazaro Hippodrome was a horse racing venue in Manila, Philippines. Owned by the Manila Jockey Club it operated from 1912 to 2002.

== History ==
The San Lazaro Hippodrome was owned and operated by the Manila Jockey Club (MJC) which was formed in 1867. Originally MJC organized races at the Santa Mesa Hippodrome.

In 1900, MJC under Juan Jose Tuason leased 12 hectares (30 acres) of land in Santa Cruz from the Sisters of the Monasterio de Santa Clara. In 1912, they bought the land from the nuns where they built a new grandstand and a six-furlong turf track for the San Lazaro Race Course.

In 1942, MJC ceased operation following the Japanese occupation during World War II. The club's facilities themselves were occupied by the Japanese the following year and after the Battle of Manila of 1945, it was used by the Americans. MJC regained possession of the racecourse in March 1946 and after renovation work it was reopened.

The Presidential Gold Cup was inaugurated at the San Lazaro race course in 1973. Subsequent editions were held until 1978. From 1979, the MJC alternated hosting duties with the Philippine Racing Club.

== Closure ==
The MJC granted SM Prime Holdings to develop 4 hectares (9.9 acres) of the track to a shopping mall.

In 2002, the MJC moved out of the San Lazaro Hippodrome to a new venue in Cavite which became known as the San Lazaro Leisure Park.

The site back in Manila was gradually developed to a mixed-use development known as the San Lazaro Tourism and Business Park.
