= Manila Jockey Club =

Horse racing institution in Manila, Philippines

- Traded as: PSE: MJC
- Industry: Horse racing
- Founded: 1867; 159 years ago in Quiapo, Manila, Captaincy General of the Philippines
- Founders: José de la Gándara y Navarro and about 100 others as co-founders
- Headquarters: Carmona, Cavite, Philippines
- Services: Horse race betting and recreation
- Website: www.manilajockey.com

The Manila Jockey Club, Inc. (MJC) was a horse racing institution in the Philippines. One of the oldest race clubs in the Asia-Pacific region, the club was established in 1867 in Manila and is based in Carmona, Cavite. It is also a member of the Asian Racing Federation.

== History ==
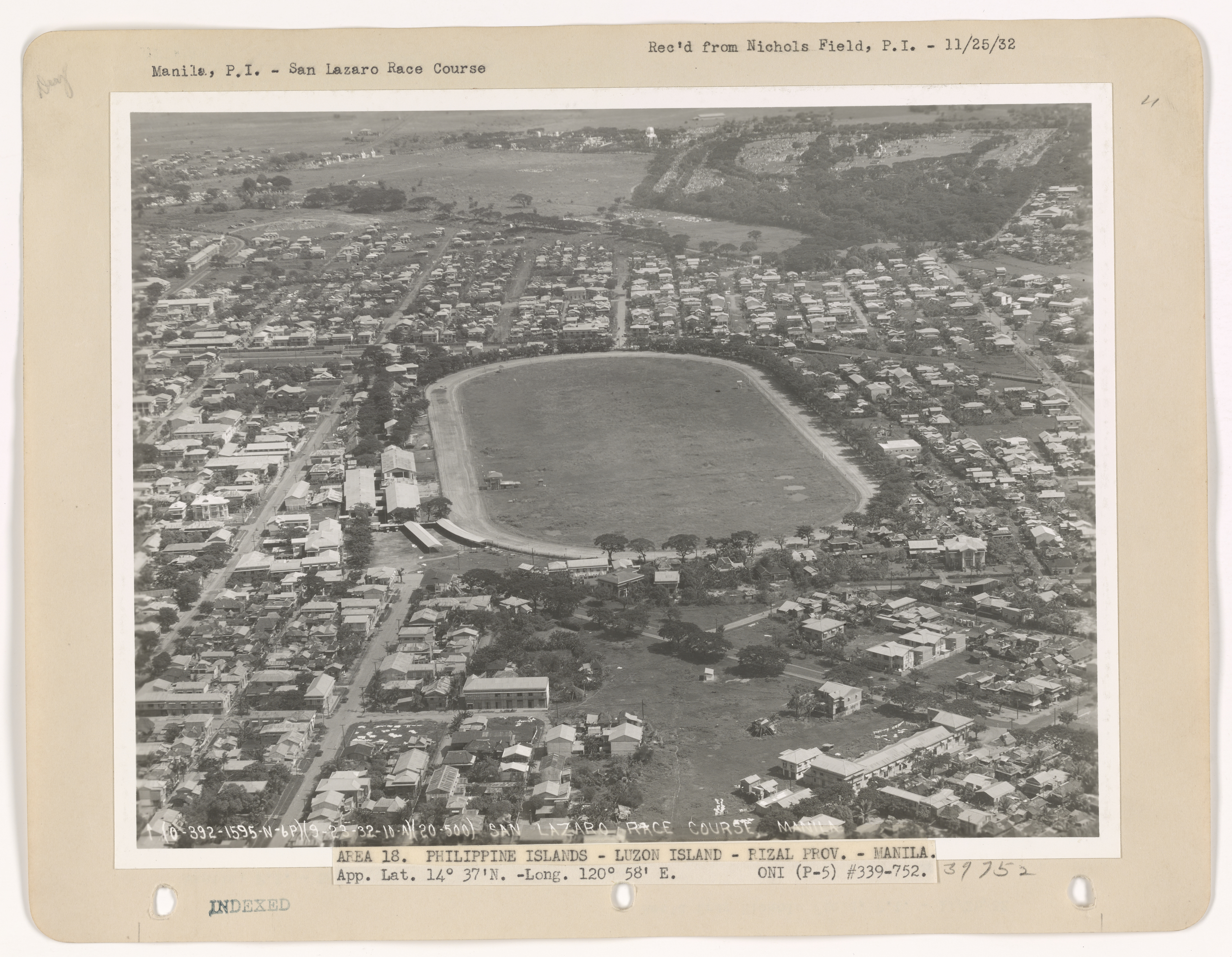
Aerial view of San Lazaro Race Course, Manila, 1932

As one of the oldest racing clubs still existing in the Asia-Pacific region, the Manila Jockey Club was established in 1867 by Governor General José de la Gándara y Navarro along with about 100 people from Spanish, American and Filipino clans from Manila. Initially, the club founded in Quiapo, held races that were only for recreation purposes where no betting is involved. Annual horse races called "fun runs" were organized by the club which ran from San Sebastian Church to Quiapo Church was held.

By the 1880s, the club moved out of Quiapo which was then becoming a commercial and residential hub for business tycoon to a rice field along the Pasig River in then-rural Santa Mesa which was rented from the Tuason family. An oval track, as well as a nipa and bamboo grandstand, was set up at the site. At least two racing meets were held at least twice starting from 1881. Initially, only members of the clubs could compete in official races while professional jockeys were allowed to compete in two of the average eight races a day.

Following the Pact of Biak-na-Bato signing in 1897, the MJC organized the Gran Copa de Manila a horse race which was later cancelled due to Battle of Manila Bay which led to the end of the Spanish colonization of the Philippines. The horse racing club temporarily closed until it was reopened in 1899.

In 1900, the MJC moved to San Lazaro in Santa Cruz, Manila. The 16-hectare (40-acre) property was leased from the Monasterio de Santa Clara. Horse racing which was previously an activity followed and practiced by the rich began to be patronized by the masses when horse race betting was introduced in 1903. The proceeds of the race either went to the improvement of MJC's assets or to charity organizations. The property was bought by the MJC in 1912 and a new grandstand and six-furlong turf track were built after the purchase.

The club had to close down again when the Japanese soldiers used the club's buildings as their barracks in 1943 during the Japanese occupation of the Philippines of World War II. After the Battle of Manila of 1945, American soldiers took over the club's facilities and used them as their garrison. The Americans later use the facilities as a hospital. Members of the club regained control over their facility in March 1946 and within two months after reconstruction efforts, the San Lazaro Hippodrome resumed operations.

MCJ was incorporated decades later after its establishment in 1937 under the name, "Manila Jockey Club, Inc.". It transferred out of the San Lazaro Hippodrome to its current site in Carmona, Cavite. Since then it holds races at the San Lazaro Leisure Park.

In August 2022, the Club (1867-2022) shut down its 155-year-old horse racing operations of the San Lazaro Leisure Park with the last races under its banners in October, disclosing the "it would focus on real estate ventures while leasing existing properties." The Club leases its horse racing facilities in Carmona, Cavite, to The Horsemen's Track of Hapi Jockey Club Inc. (HJCI)

== Other sports ==
Aside from horse racing, the Manila Jockey Club has been involved in football. It had its own football club in the early 1900s which was organized after the end of the Philippine-American War. MJC's football team competed with other local teams such as the Manila Sporting Club, the Paris Club, the Sandow Athletic Club, and the Bohemian Sporting Club. It has also worked with the Philippine Football Federation to establish the National Training Center, a football training center within San Lazaro Leisure Park.
