= Santa Cruz, Manila =

District of Manila

Santa Cruz
- District of Manila
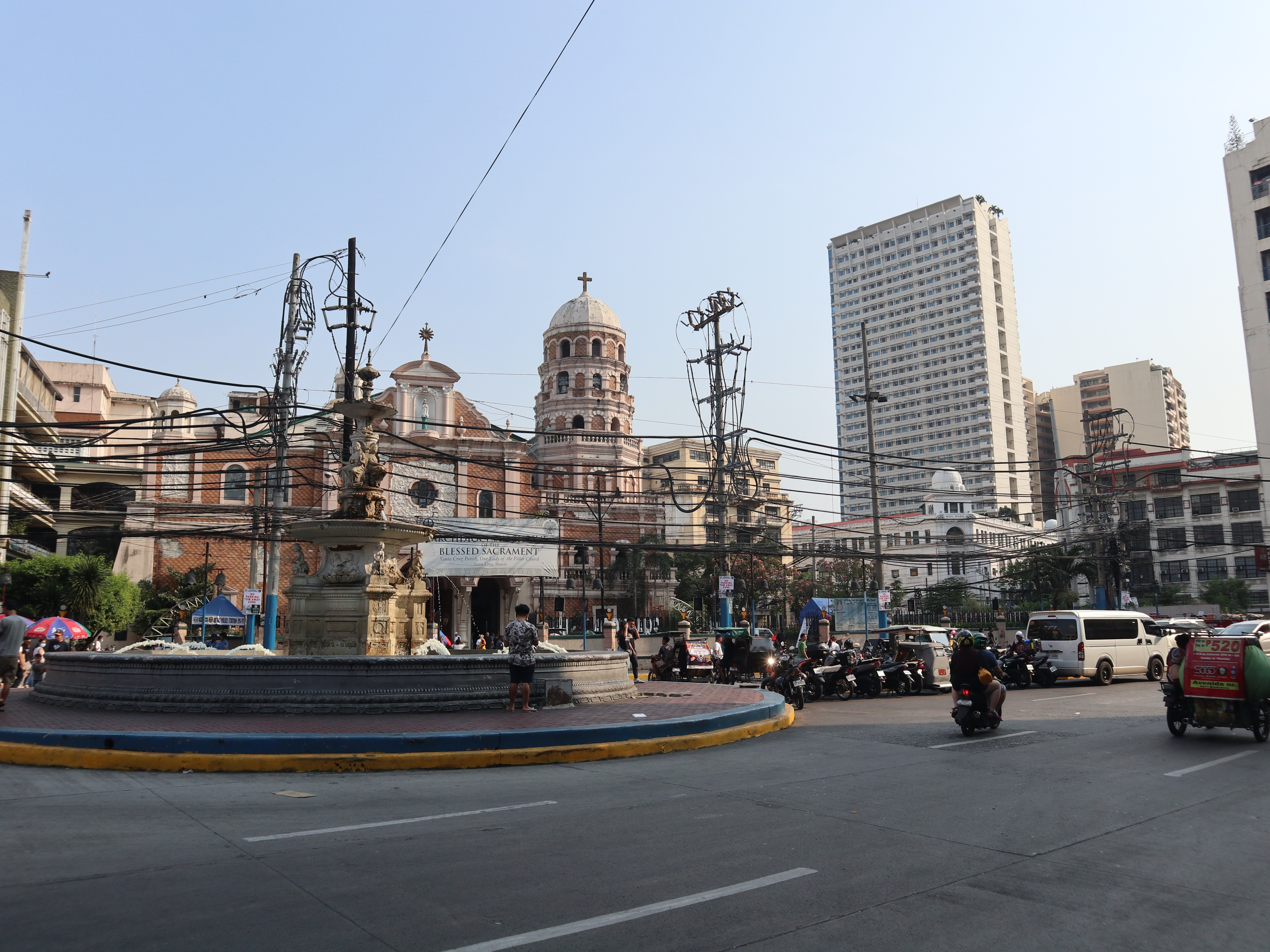
- Plaza Santa Cruz with Carriedo Fountain and Santa Cruz Church

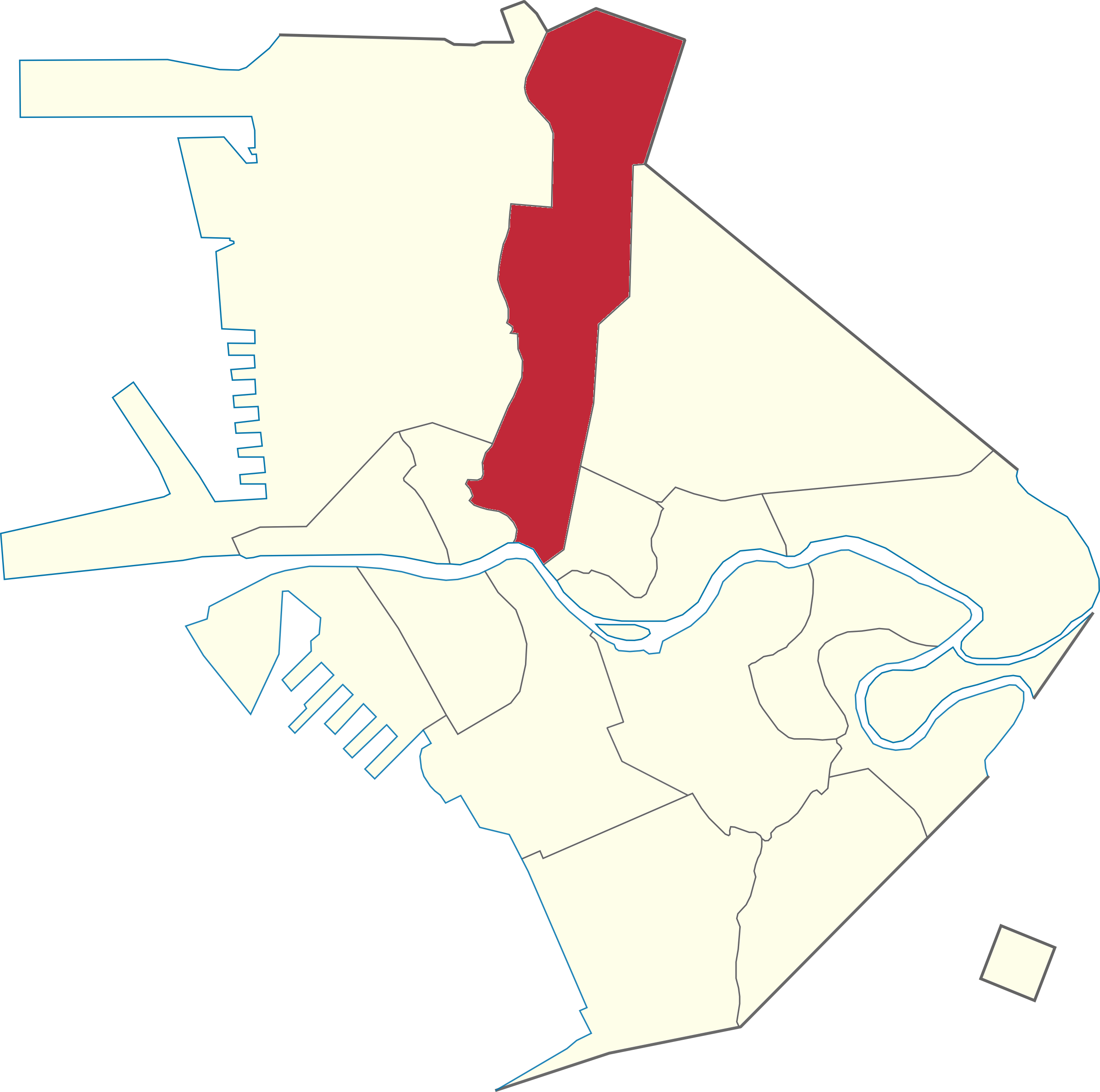
- Map of Manila showing the location of Santa Cruz
- Coordinates: 14.5998366°N 120.9801955°E
- Country: Philippines
- Region: National Capital Region
- City: Manila
- District: Part of the 3rd district of Manila
- Barangays: 82

Area
  - Total: 3.0901 km^{2} (1.1931 sq mi)

Population (2020)
  - Total: 126,735
  - Density: 41,013/km^{2} (106,220/sq mi)
- Time zone: UTC+08:00 (Philippine Standard Time)
- Zip codes: 1003 (Santa Cruz South); 1014 (Santa Cruz North)
- Area codes: 02

Santa Cruz is a district in the northern part of the City of Manila, Philippines, located on the right bank of the Pasig River near its mouth. It is bordered by the districts of Tondo, Binondo, Quiapo, and Sampaloc, as well as the areas of Grace Park and Barrio San José in Caloocan, and the district of La Loma in Quezon City. The district belongs to the 3rd congressional district of Manila.

== History ==
=== Spanish colonial era ===
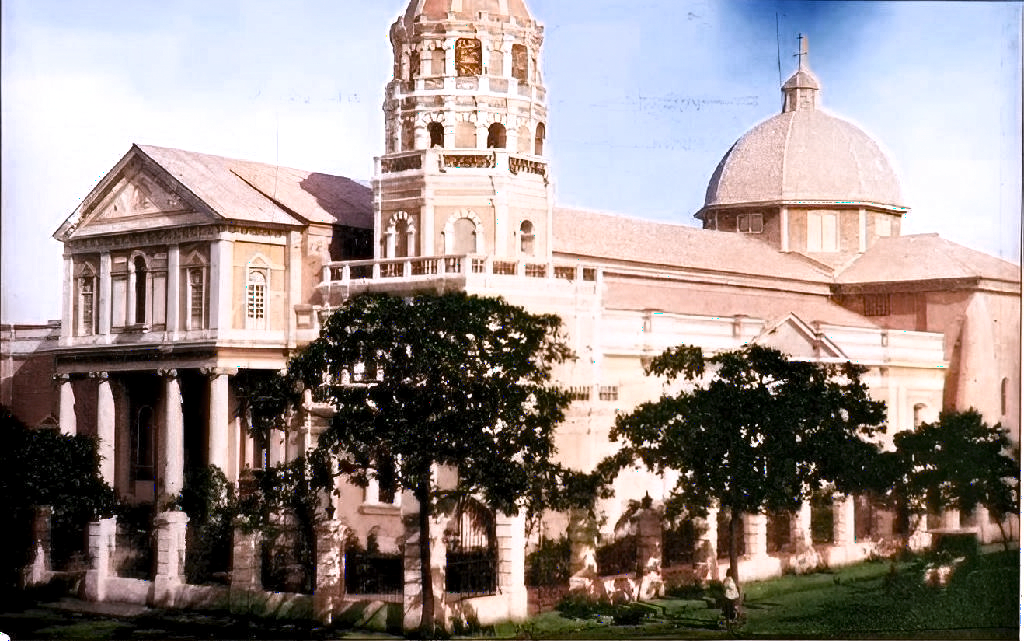
Old Santa Cruz Church with its Ionic columns before it was destroyed in World War 2.

Prior to the arrival of the Spanish conquistadors to the Philippine archipelago in 1521, the district of Santa Cruz was partly marshland, patches of greenery, orchards, and ricefields. A Spanish expedition in 1581 claimed the territory and awarded it to the Society of Jesus. Back then it was called the island of Mayhaligue.

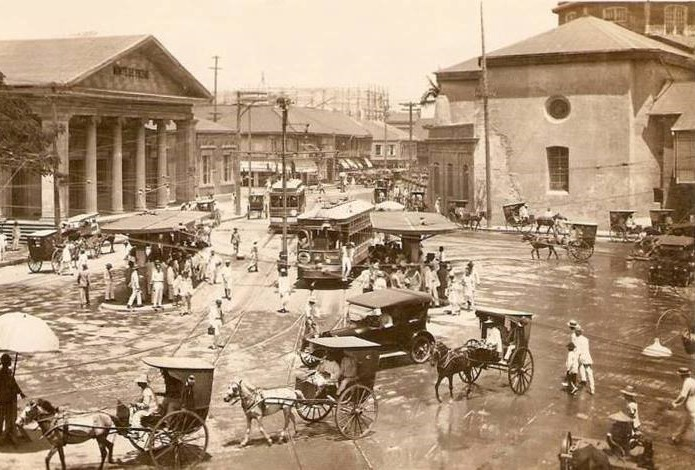
Plaza Goiti (now Plaza Lacson)

The Jesuits then built the first Catholic church in the area, where the present Santa Cruz Church stands on June 20, 1619. The Jesuits enshrined the image of the Our Lady of The Pillar in 1643, and they served the area’s pre-dominantly Chinese residents. The image attracted devotees and a popular cultus grew around it

At Santa Cruz Church, a small park was built that connected the area to the headquarters of the Spanish cavalry, which once was the Jesuit-run Colegio de San Ildefonso. The district in Spanish times also had a slaughterhouse and meat market, and further north was the Chinese Cemetery.

On June 24, 1784, King Carlos III of Spain gave the deeds to about 2 km^{2} (0.77 sq mi) of land that was part of the Hacienda de Mayhaligue to San Lázaro Hospital, which served as the regional leprosarium. Franciscans were charged with caring for the lepers of the city, and Father Félix Huerta developed San Lázaro into a refuge for the afflicted on the north side of the Pasig River.

=== World War II ===
During World War II, the Japanese occupying forces, caught unaware of the fast-approaching joint American and Filipino soldiers from the north, abandoned the northern banks of the Pasig including the Santa Cruz area. The district and northern portions of Manila were spared from the heavy shelling which flattened the city, and to date, a number of pre-World War II buildings still stand in Santa Cruz.

When the Third Philippine Republic was proclaimed on July 4, 1946, the San Lázaro Hospital complex became the headquarters of the Department of Health.

== Notable buildings ==
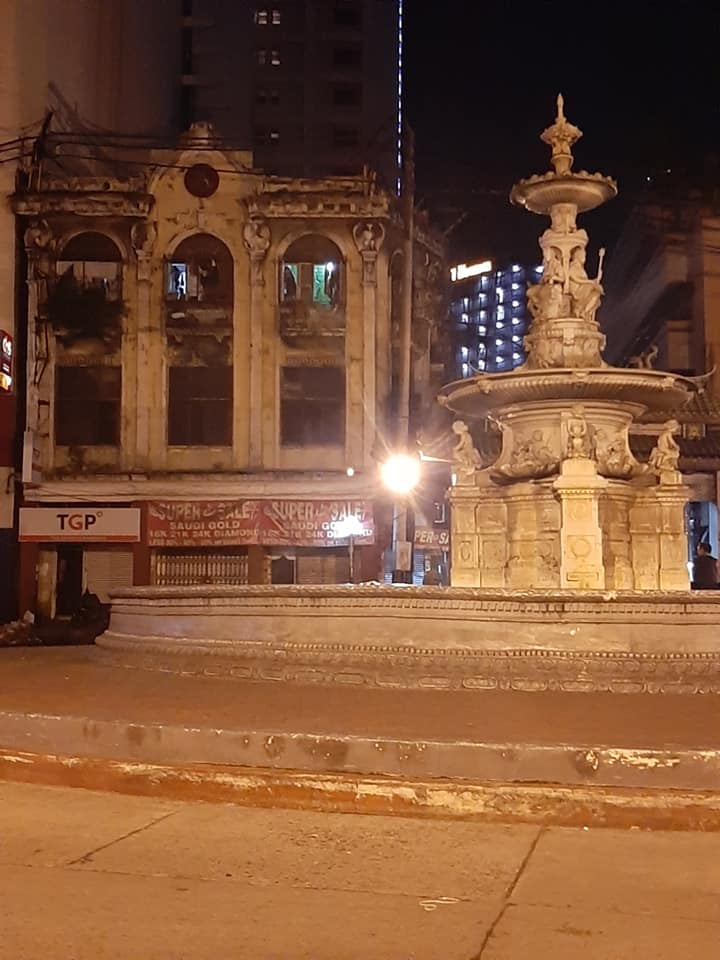
Carriedo Fountain

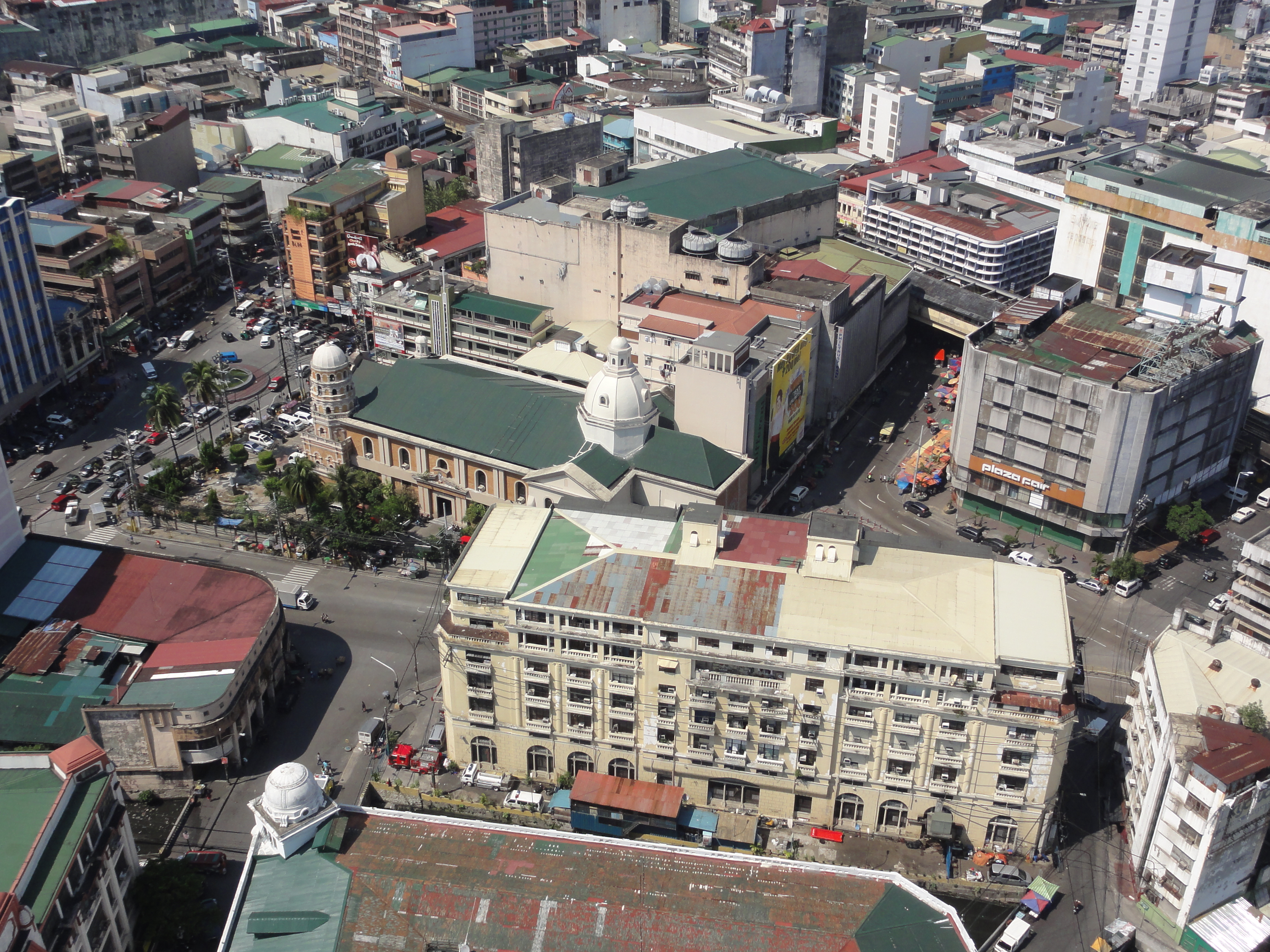
Aerial view of Santa Cruz

=== Santa Cruz Church ===
The first Santa Cruz Church was built when the Arrabal (Suburb) of Santa Cruz was established by the Jesuits in the early 1600s. The church had undergone many repairs and reconstruction, with the last reconstruction done in the 1950s. Today, the church architecture employs a California Spanish Mission style facade silhouette with the usual Filipino (Asian-Hispanic mix) Baroque ornamentation. The church facade is topped with an effigy statue of Our Lady of the Pillar, the patroness of the church whose feast happens every third Sunday of October and on the 12th day of October.

=== Cemeteries ===
Santa Cruz is home to Manila's oldest cemeteries located in the district's northern section namely, La Loma Cemetery (shared with Caloocan), the Manila Chinese Cemetery, and the city's biggest, the Manila North Cemetery.

== Main thoroughfares ==
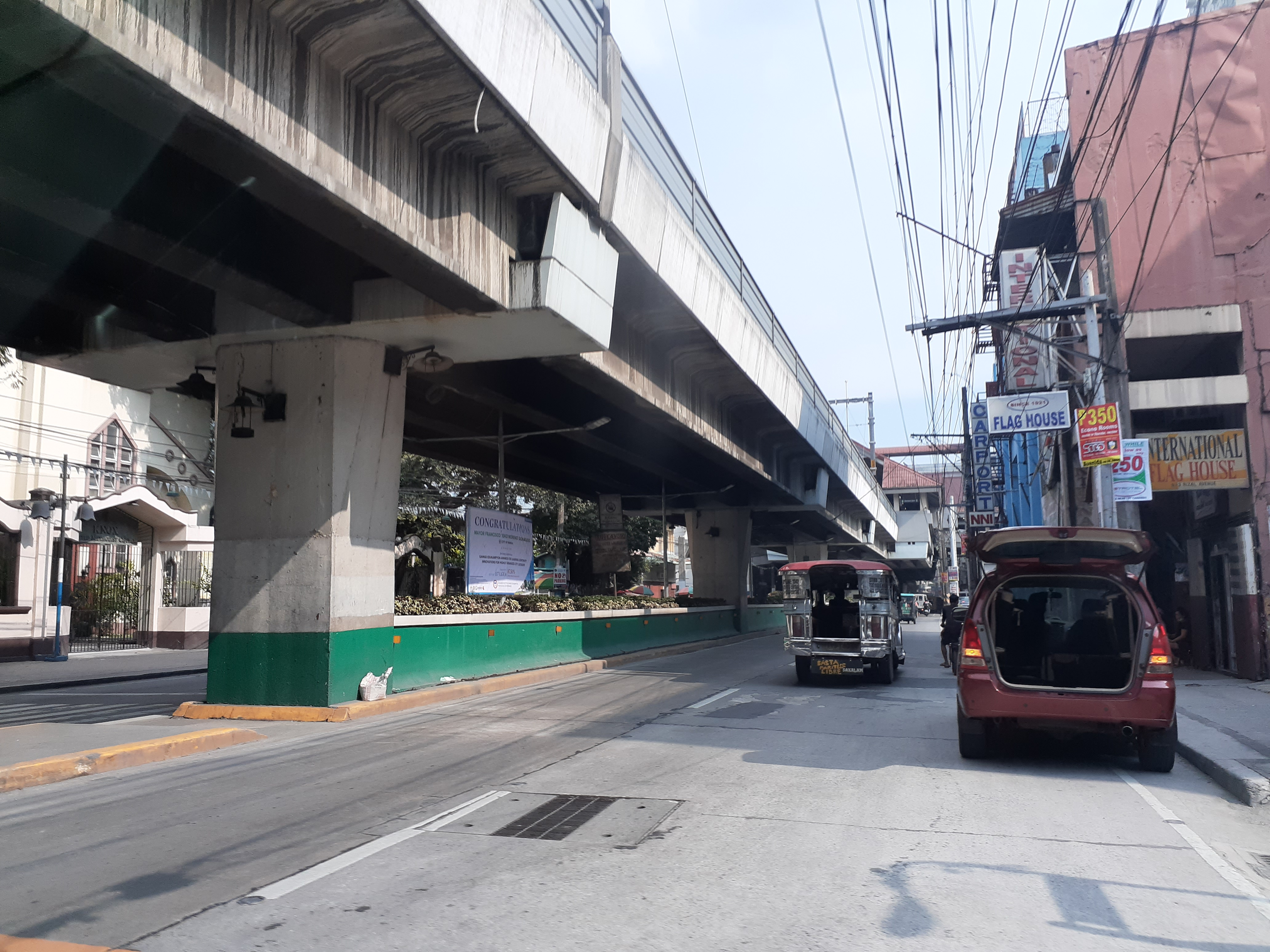
Rizal Avenue

Rizal Avenue is the main thoroughfare in the district. The district is also accessible via the following roads:

- Recto Avenue
- Tayuman Street
- Blumentritt Road

Stations of the LRT Line 1 located in Santa Cruz are Carriedo (shared with Quiapo), Doroteo Jose, Bambang, Tayuman and Blumentritt (shared with Tondo). The Philippine National Railways has a station in Blumentritt. Jeepneys coming from Baclaran, Pasay, Valenzuela, Novaliches and Caloocan pass through Rizal Avenue.

== Education ==
As of February 2024, the Manila Department of Education lists three senior high schools in Santa Cruz, namely Cayetano Arellano, Manuel L. Quezon (SHS), and Doña Teodora Alonzo.

== Barangays ==
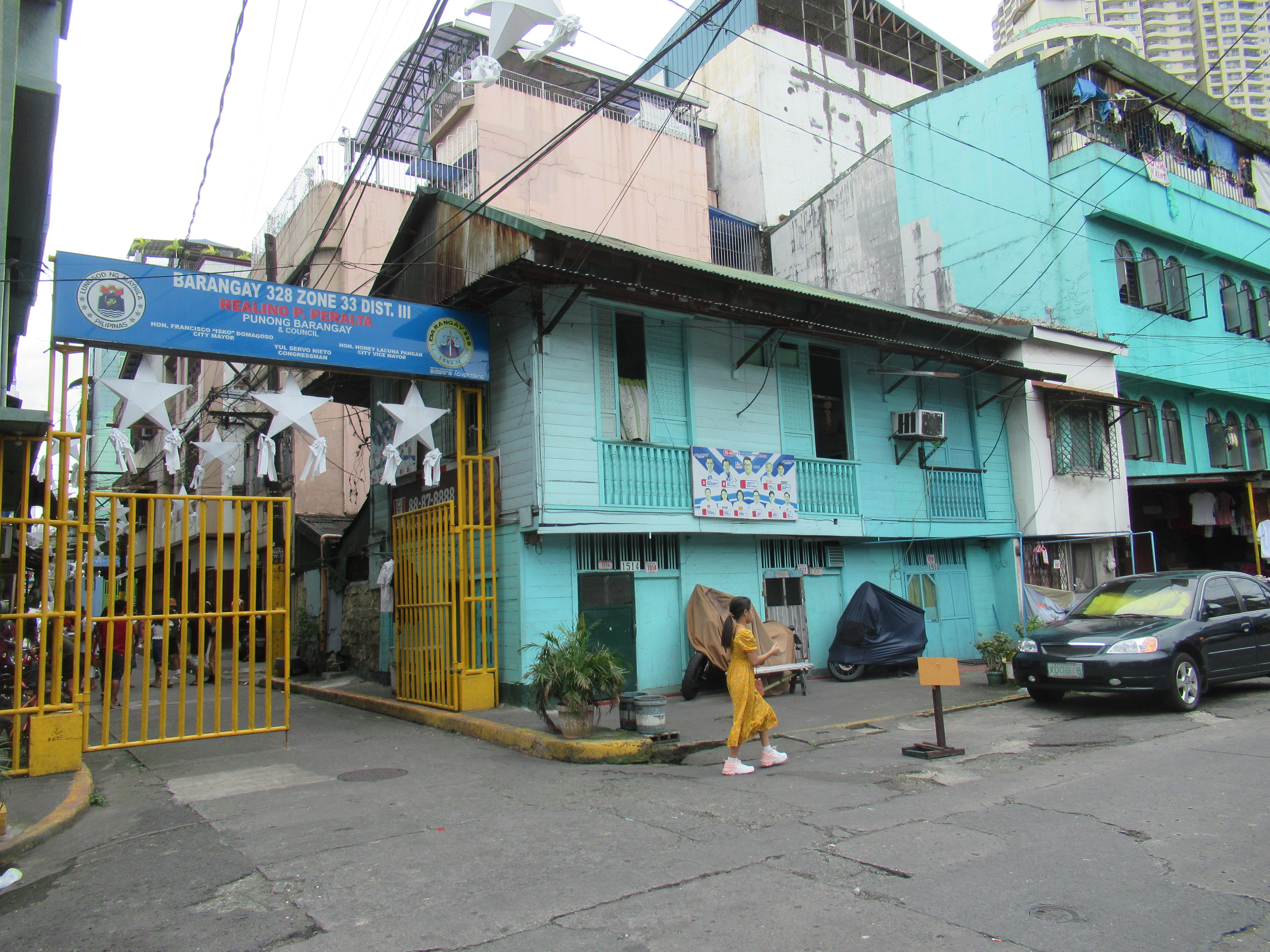
Barangay 328

Santa Cruz has 82 barangays, grouped in nine Zones of the City of Manila.

Barangay	Land area (km^{2})	Population (2020 census)
Zone 29
Barangay 297	0.03272 km^{2}	2,005
Barangay 298	0.03450 km^{2}	1,020
Barangay 299	0.03215 km^{2}	1,300
Barangay 300	0.01291 km^{2}	981
Barangay 301	0.01767 km^{2}	448
Barangay 302	0.01031 km^{2}	654
Barangay 303	0.06499 km^{2}	641
Barangay 304	0.02792 km^{2}	298
Barangay 305	0.03740 km^{2}	645
Zone 31
Barangay 310	0.08649 km^{2}	13,602
Barangay 311	0.04576 km^{2}	2,401
Barangay 312	0.03626 km^{2}	3,328
Barangay 313	0.05434 km^{2}	2,848
Barangay 314	0.05279 km^{2}	2,064
Zone 32
Barangay 315	0.06805 km^{2}	1,786
Barangay 316	0.01934 km^{2}	829
Barangay 317	0.02480 km^{2}	1,542
Barangay 318	0.01268 km^{2}	740
Barangay 319	0.01705 km^{2}	1,209
Barangay 320	0.02429 km^{2}	1,300
Barangay 321	0.01300 km^{2}	240
Barangay 322	0.01519 km^{2}	799
Barangay 323	0.02378 km^{2}	1,060
Barangay 324	0.01246 km^{2}	605
Barangay 325	0.009850 km^{2}	522
Zone 33
Barangay 326	0.01226 km^{2}	825
Barangay 327	0.03052 km^{2}	1,239
Barangay 328	0.01152 km^{2}	679
Barangay 329	0.01629 km^{2}	439
Barangay 330	0.02729 km^{2}	2,244
Barangay 331	0.1383 km^{2}	924
Barangay 332	0.01247 km^{2}	582
Barangay 333	0.01653 km^{2}	877
Barangay 334	0.03035 km^{2}	1,461
Barangay 335	0.02878 km^{2}	1,350
Zone 34
Barangay 336	0.03266 km^{2}	2,134
Barangay 337	0.02884 km^{2}	1,386
Barangay 338	0.02865 km^{2}	1,378
Barangay 339	0.02748 km^{2}	1,265
Barangay 340	0.02861 km^{2}	2,009
Barangay 341	0.03320 km^{2}	1,463
Barangay 342	0.05714 km^{2}	1,634
Barangay 343	0.04155 km^{2}	2,209
Zone 35
Barangay 344	0.03498 km^{2}	536
Barangay 345	0.02953 km^{2}	1,149
Barangay 346	0.02944 km^{2}	1,511
Barangay 347	0.02963 km^{2}	1,266
Barangay 348	0.02268 km^{2}	1,249
Barangay 349	0.01395 km^{2}	788
Barangay 350	0.1555 km^{2}	6,776
Barangay 351	0.05098 km^{2}	3,401
Barangay 352	0.03569 km^{2}	1,342
Zone 36
Barangay 353	0.04906 km^{2}	2,232
Barangay 354	0.04162 km^{2}	1,810
Barangay 355	0.04534 km^{2}	970
Barangay 356	0.02078 km^{2}	505
Barangay 357	0.02063 km^{2}	736
Barangay 358	0.02023 km^{2}	1,029
Barangay 359	0.01921 km^{2}	410
Barangay 360	0.03144 km^{2}	741
Barangay 361	0.02054 km^{2}	715
Barangay 362	0.01722 km^{2}	252
Zone 37
Barangay 363	0.02382 km^{2}	559
Barangay 364	0.02242 km^{2}	1,985
Barangay 365	0.01923 km^{2}	1,278
Barangay 366	0.02240 km^{2}	1,193
Barangay 367	0.03112 km^{2}	1,708
Barangay 368	0.02616 km^{2}	1,337
Barangay 369	0.02241 km^{2}	1,396
Barangay 370	0.02005 km^{2}	772
Barangay 371	0.02486 km^{2}	842
Barangay 372	0.5443 km^{2}	4,136
Zone 38
Barangay 373	0.01963 km^{2}	3,788
Barangay 374	0.02657 km^{2}	3,277
Barangay 375	0.01737 km^{2}	3,909
Barangay 376	0.04343 km^{2}	930
Barangay 377	0.01518 km^{2}	578
Barangay 378	0.02461 km^{2}	602
Barangay 379	0.009460 km^{2}	654
Barangay 380	0.01454 km^{2}	921
Barangay 381	0.02978 km^{2}	1,591
Barangay 382	0.03314 km^{2}	896

=== Sub-districts ===
Barangays

Zone	Barangays
Zone 29	Barangays 297, 298, 299, 300, 301, 302, 303, 304, and 305
Zone 31	Barangays 310, 311, 312, 313, and 314
Zone 32	Barangays 315, 316, 317, 318, 319, 320, 321, 322, 323, 324, and 325
Zone 33	Barangays 326, 327, 328, 329, 330, 331, 332, 334, and 335
Zone 34	Barangays 336, 337, 338, 339, 340, 341, 342, and 343
Zone 35	Barangays 344, 345, 346, 347, 348 349, 350, 351, and 352
Zone 36	Barangays 353, 354, 355, 356, 357, 358, 359, 360, 361, and 362
Zone 37	Barangays 363, 364, 365, 366, 367, 368, 369, 370, 371, and 372
Zone 38	Barangays 373, 374, 375, 376, 377, 378, 379, 380, 381, and 382

Santa Cruz has two postal codes corresponding to its two sub-districts: 1014 for Santa Cruz North and 1003 for Santa Cruz South.

List of Streets within Santa Cruz (North)
STREETS
ALMEDA
ANACLETO
ANDRADE
ARAGON
AURORA BLVD.
BALAGUER
BALANGA
BALDWIN
BATANGAS
BECERINA
BLUMENTRITT
BOLINAO
BUGALLON
BULACAN
CAMARINES
CAVITE
CHINESE CEMETERY
CONSUELO
DINALUPIHAN
ELIAS
FELINA
FELIX HUERTAS
FIESTA
GEN. DIOKNO
ILUSTRE
IPIL
JOSE ABAD SANTOS
KALIMBAS
KARAPATAN
KUSANG LOOB
LA LOMA CEMETERY
LICO
LICO EXT.
M. HIZON
M. NATIVIDAD
MAKATA
MOUNT SAMAT
NEW ANTIPOLO
NORTH CEMETERY
OLD ANTIPOLO
ORANI
ORION
OROQUIETA
P.GUEVARRA
PAMPANGA
QUIROGA
RIVERA
RIZAL AVE.
S.REYES
SAGANI
SAMPAGUITA
SAN LAZARO HIPPODROME
SULU
TAMBUNTING
TAYABAS
TECSON
TIAGO
TINDALO
TINDALO EXT.
TOMAS MAPUA
VISION
YAKAL

List of Streets within Santa Cruz (South)
Streets
AGUILAR
ALEGRE
ALMEDA
ALONZO
ALVARADO EXT.
ALVAREZ
ALVAREZ EXT.
ANACLETO
APITONG
BAHAMA
BAMBANG
BENAVIDEZ
BERMUDA
BIAK-NA-BATO
BUSTOS
DAPDAP
DE GUIA
DIZON
DOROTEO JOSE
E. REMIGIO
ESPELETA
F.DE LEON
F. TORRES
FELIX HUERTAS
FERNANDEZ
G. ARANETA
GANDARA
GIL PUYAT
INFEROR
IPIL
J.REYES MEMORIAL HOSPITAL
KALIMBAS
KATUBUSAN
KUSANG LOOB
LA TORRE
LOPE DE VEGA
LUZON
M. NATIVIDAD
MAKATA
MALABON
MASANGKAY
MAYHALIGUE
MILAGROS
NARCISA RIZAL
OKIPINJA
ONGPIN
OROQUIETA
P. GUEVARRA
PIEDAD
QUIRICADA
REYES
SALAZAR
SAN BERNARDO
SAN LAZARO HOSPITAL
SAN NICOLAS
SANCHEZ
SANTIAGO
SOLER
SULU
TECSON
TETUAN
TINDALO
TOMAS MAPUA
TRONQUED
TUBERIA
YAKAL
YEBANA
ZACATEROS

== Barangay Beatles ==
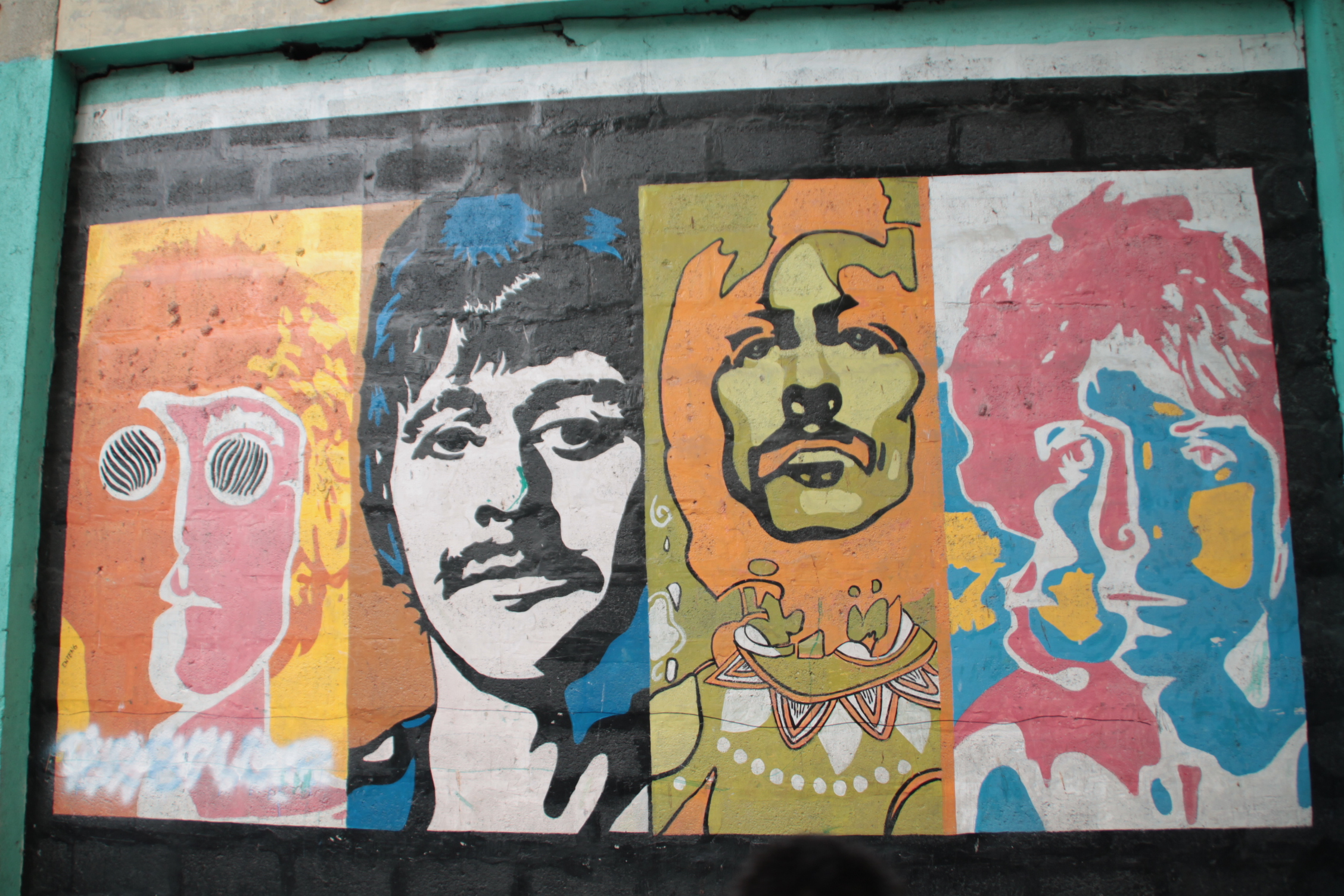
Barangay Beatles street art

Barangay Beatles is a nickname for an alley called officially, Kusang Loob, meaning voluntary, (historical name — Calle Negros) located in the district of Santa Cruz, Manila in the Philippines. This alley is unique because it only serves as a passageway for pedestrians and tricycles, with gates installed at each end which are opened strictly during stated hours of the day. The Brgy. Beatles alleyway traverses alongside two adjacent Taoist temples, named Kiu Siao and Liu Siao of the Fil-Sino Taoist Movement, from its gate at Lope de Vega Street on one end, to its second gate at Valeriano Fugoso street (historical name: Calle Zurbaran) on the other end, where the walls are drawn and painted with decorative graffiti of the Beatles by commissioned Barangay staff there. The nomenclature Barangay Beatles emerged as part of a broader cultural trend among residents of Greater Manila as an homage to The Beatles.

Coordinates: 14°36'28"N 120°58'47"E

== Gallery ==
=== Religious buildings ===
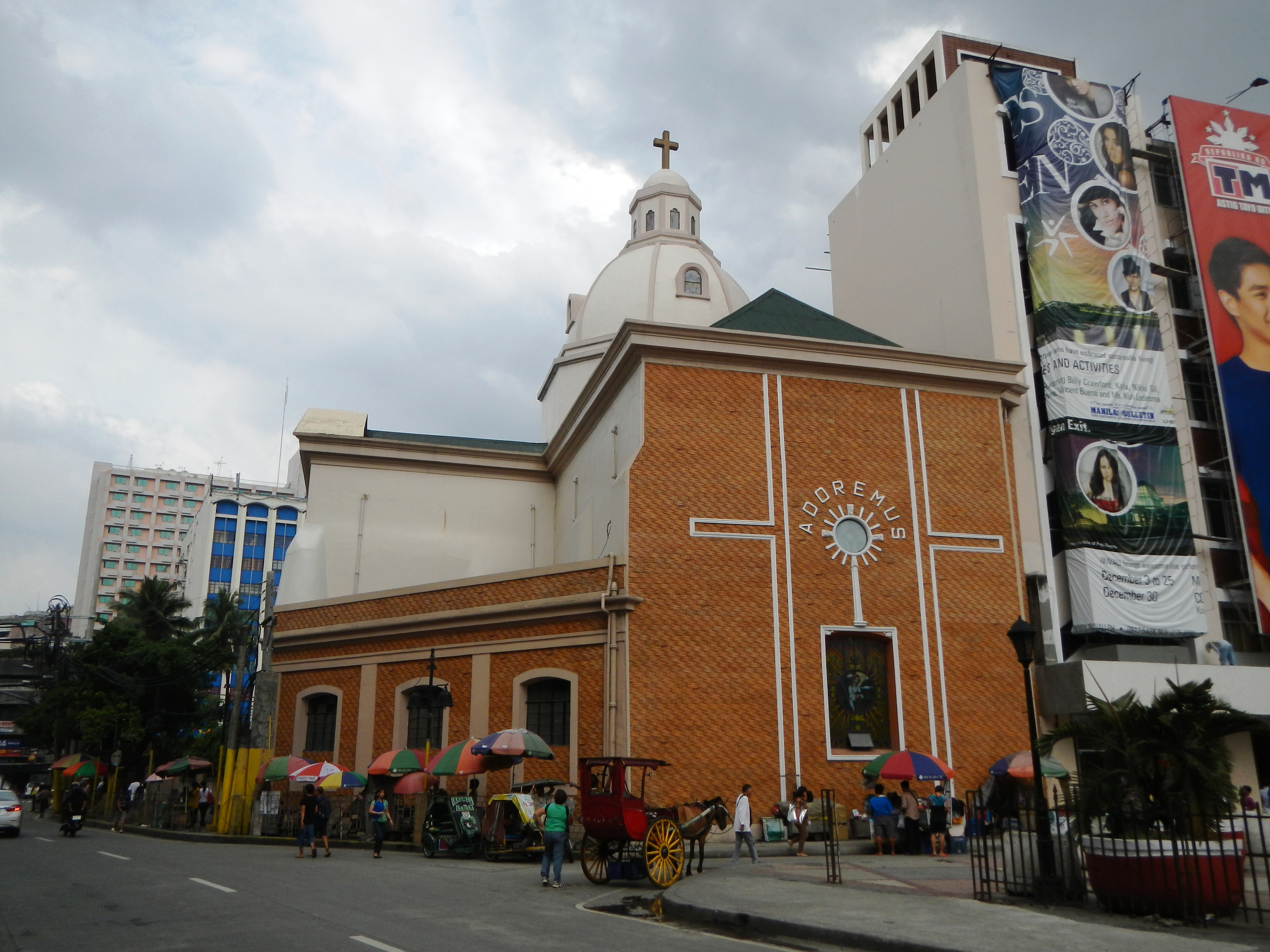
Santa Cruz Church

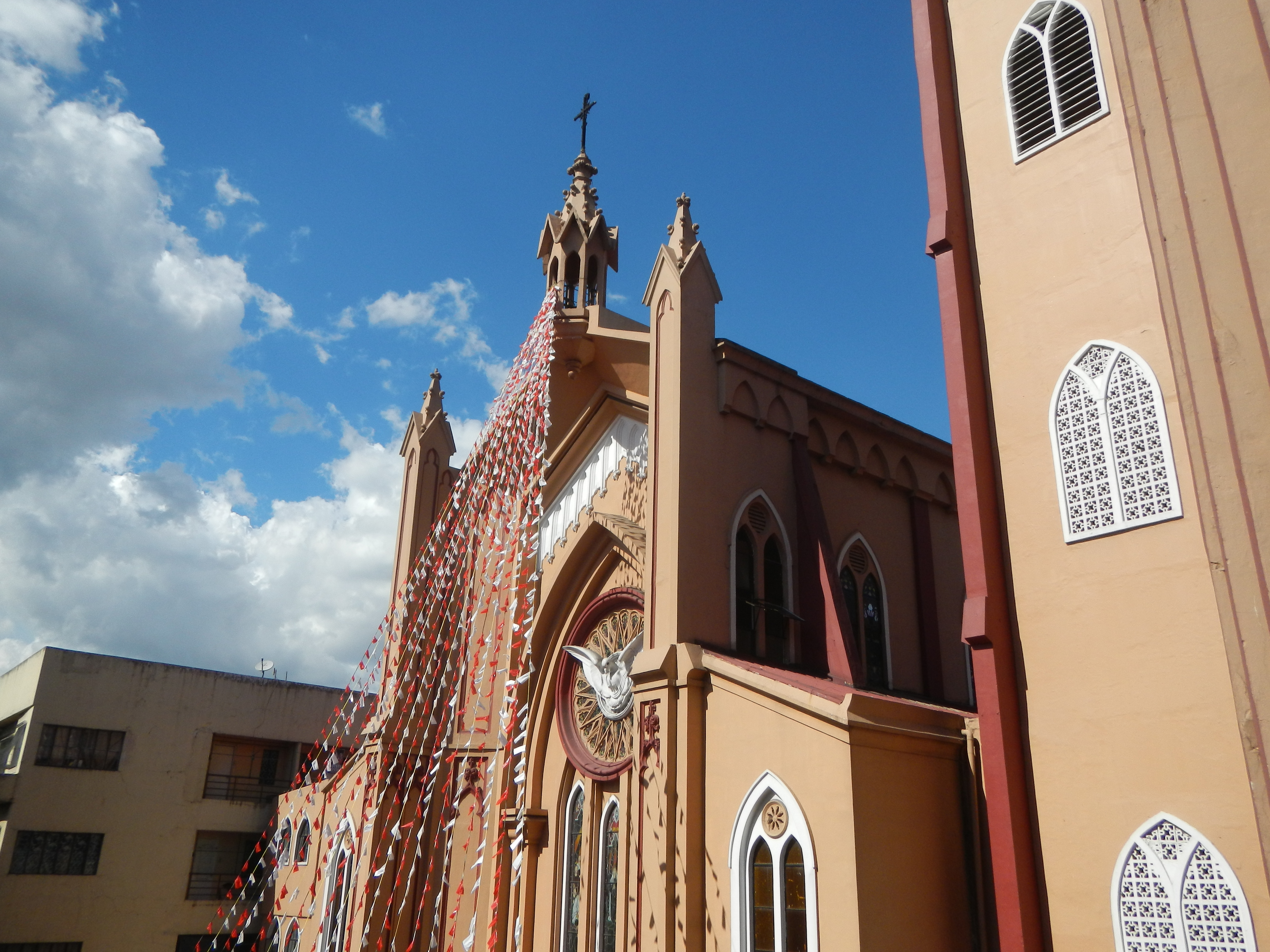
Archdiocesan Shrine of Espiritu Santo

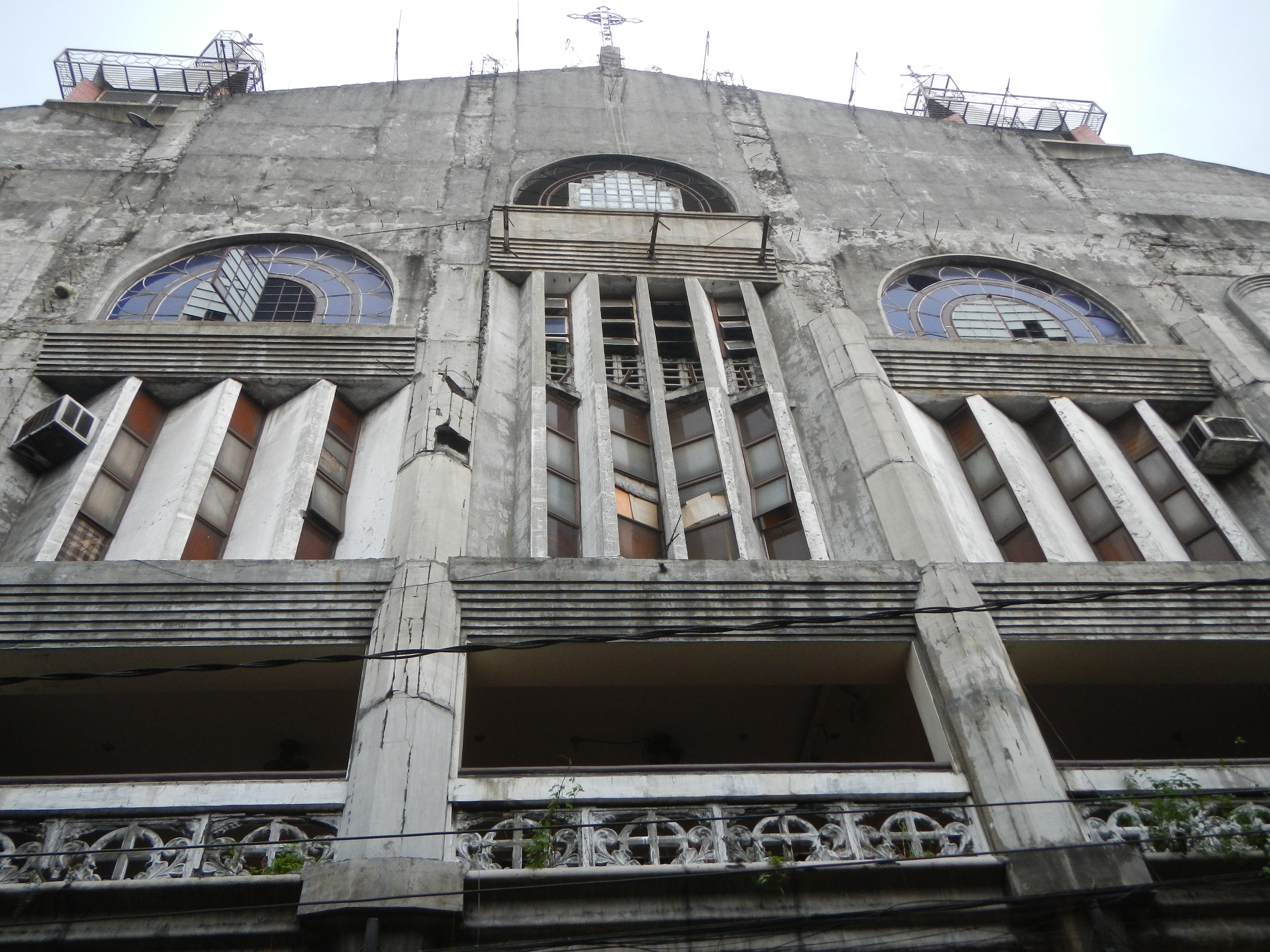
San Roque Church

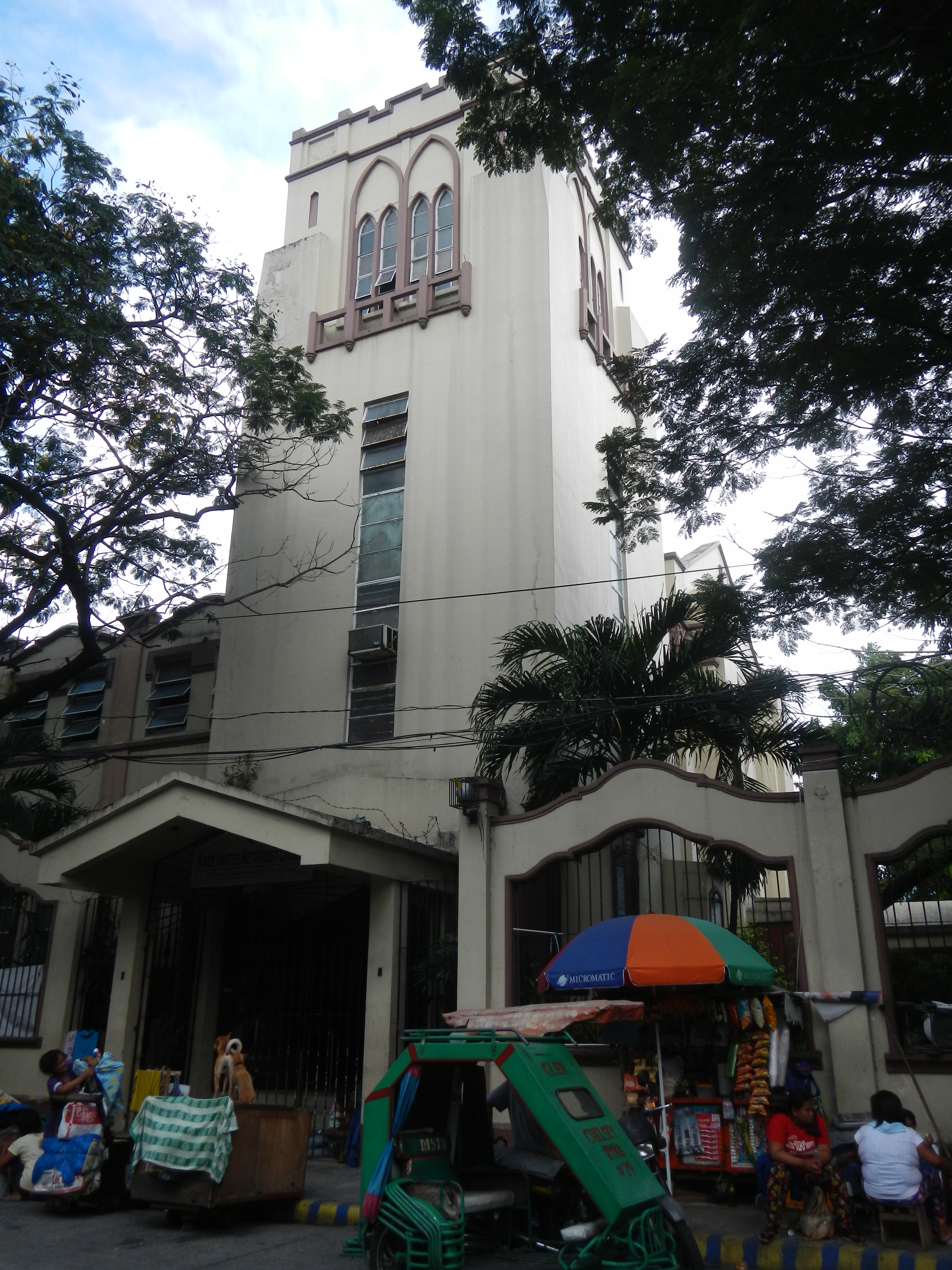
Bethel Knox United Methodist Church

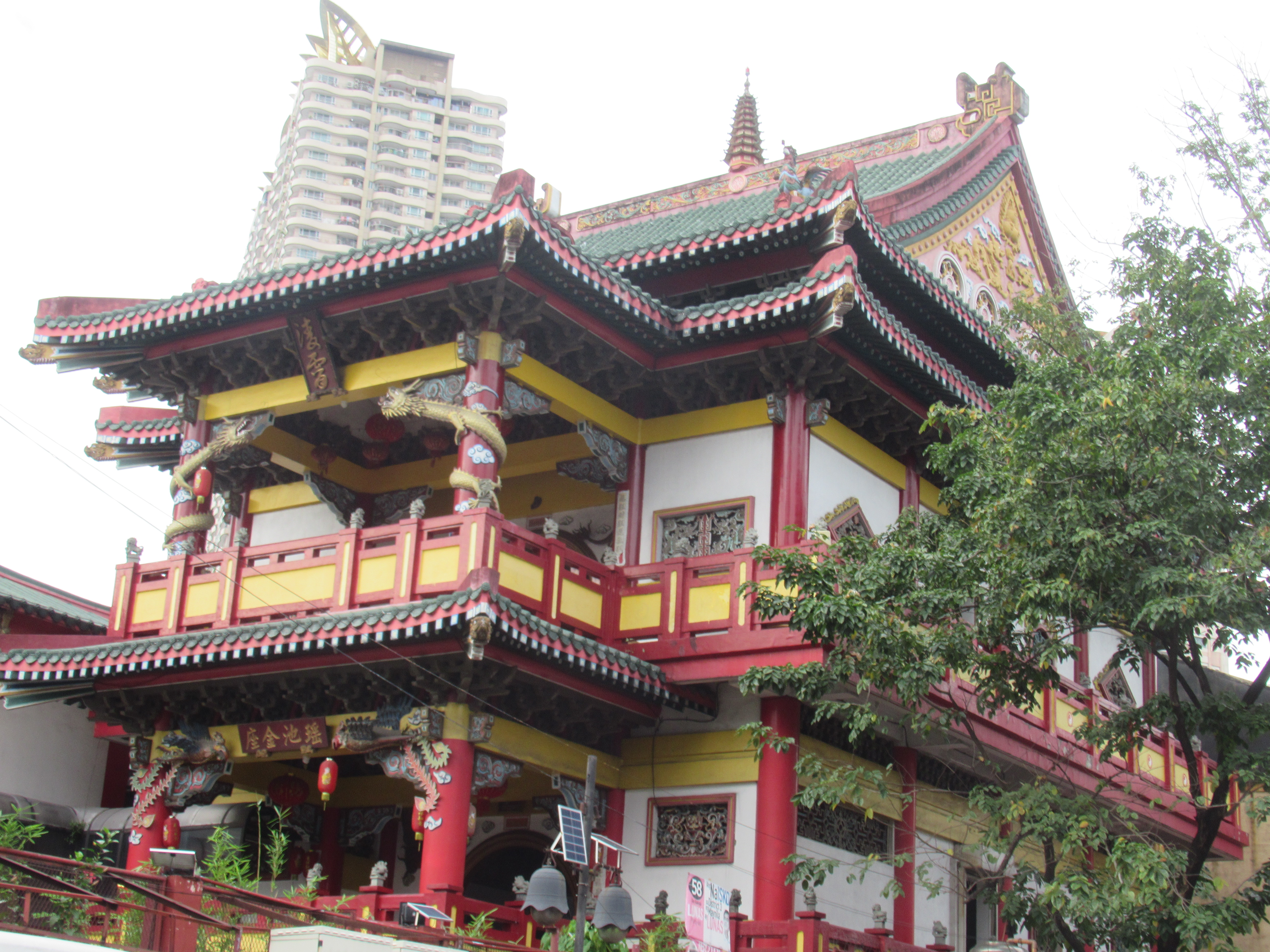
Philippine Kiu Siao Grand Taoist Temple

=== Civic institutions ===
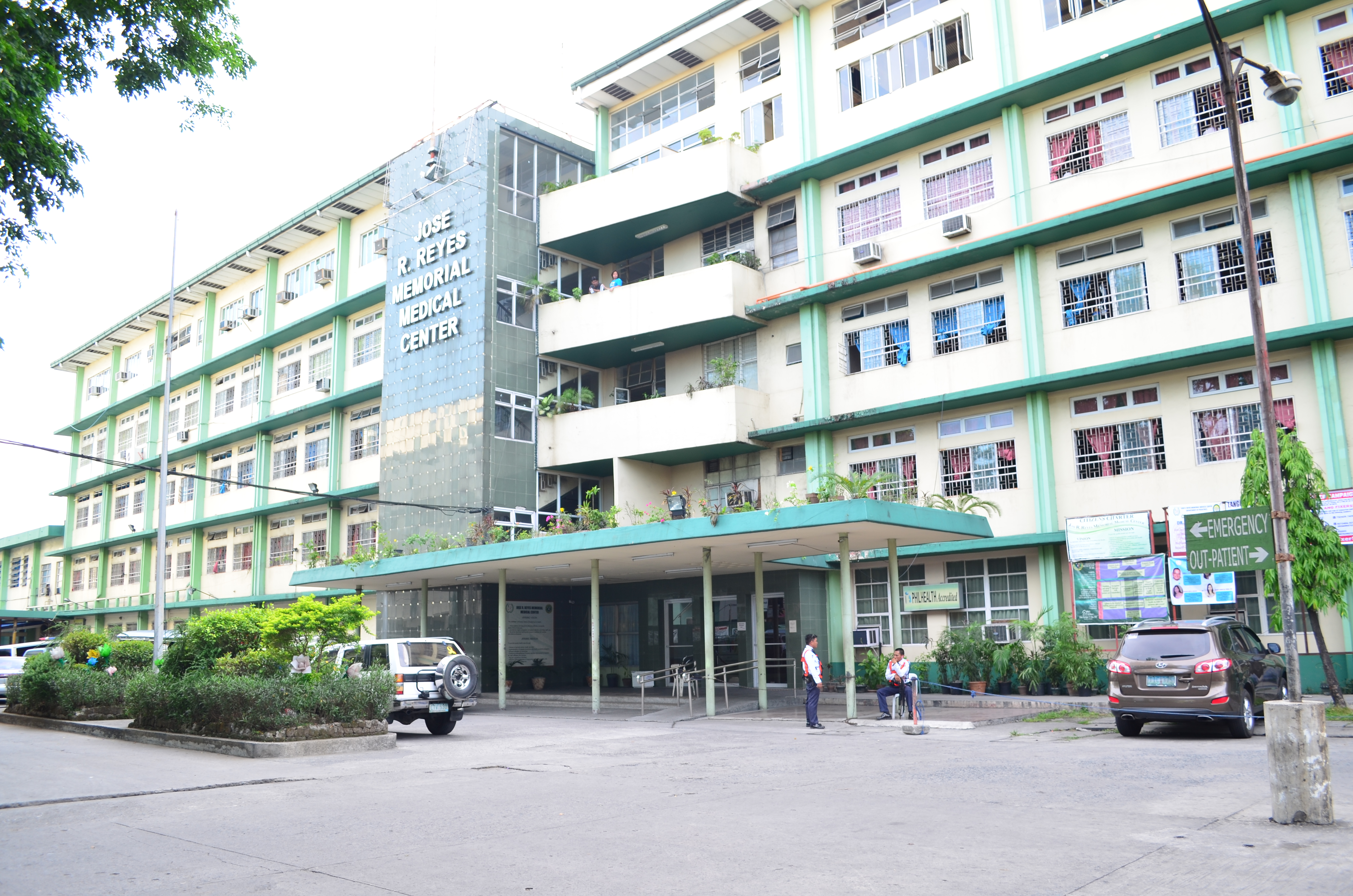
José R. Reyes Memorial Medical Center

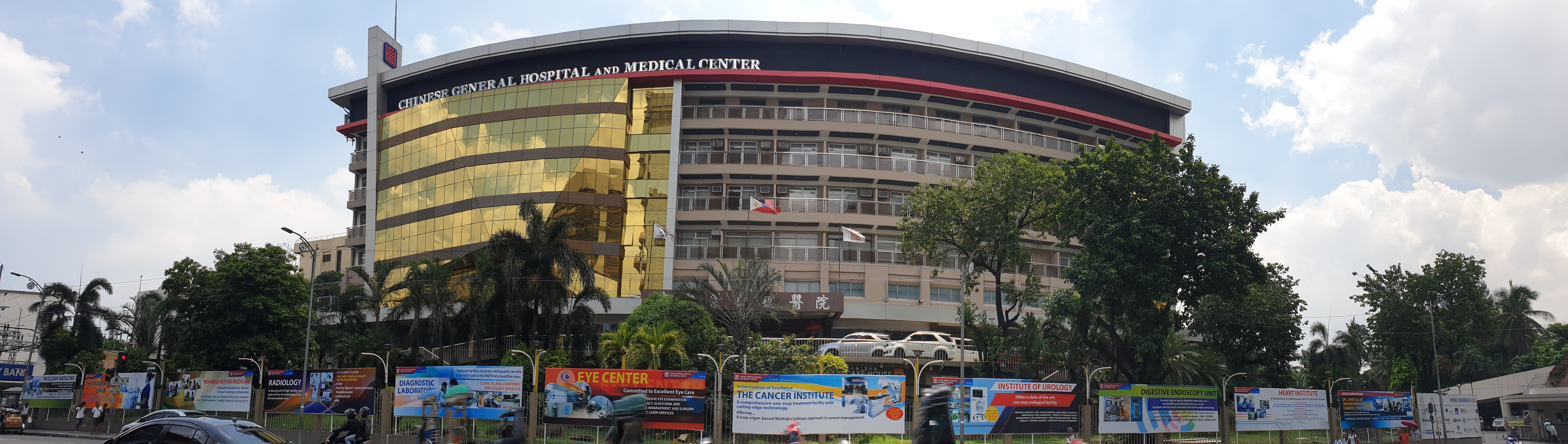
Chinese General Hospital

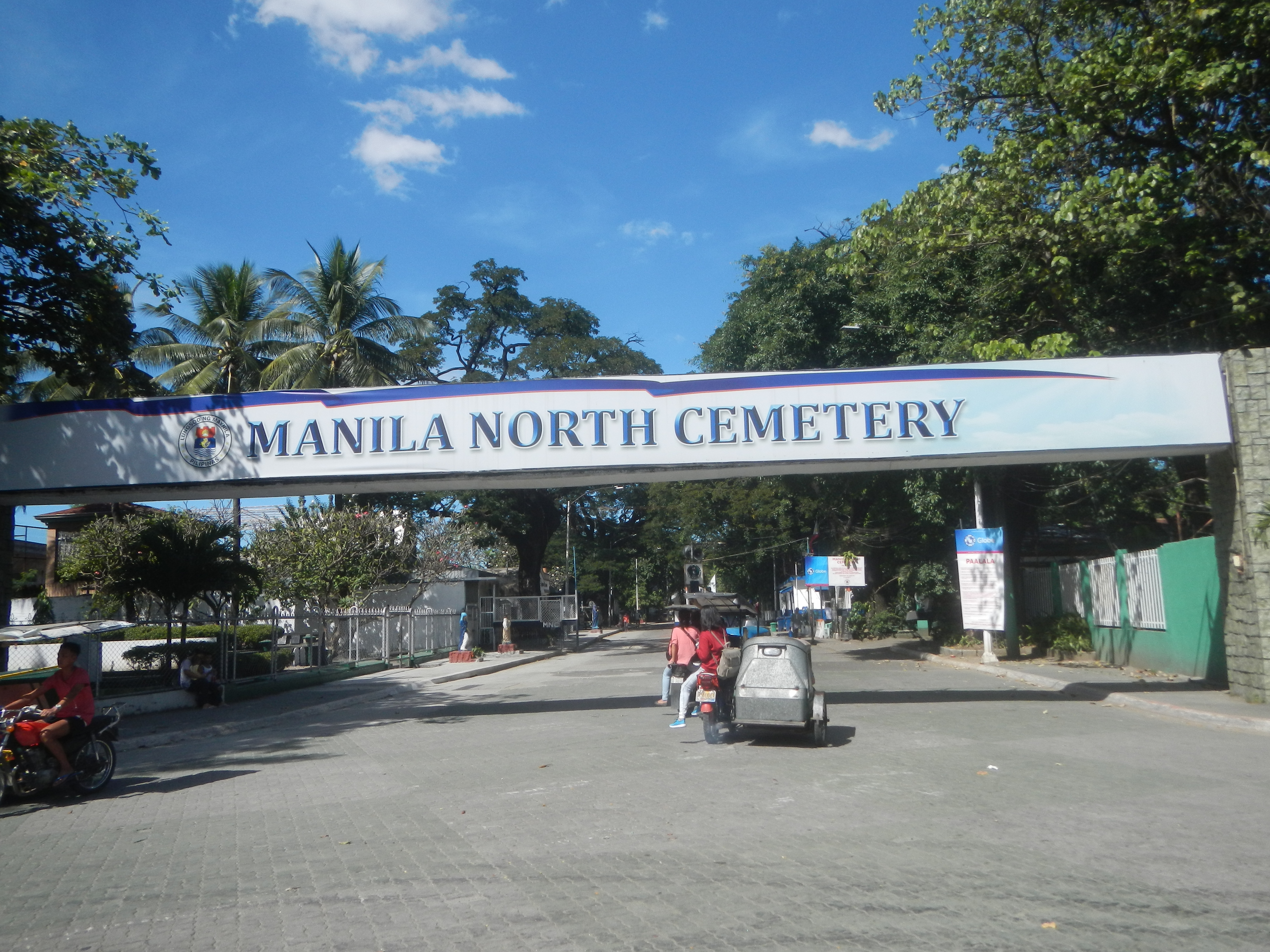
Manila North Cemetery

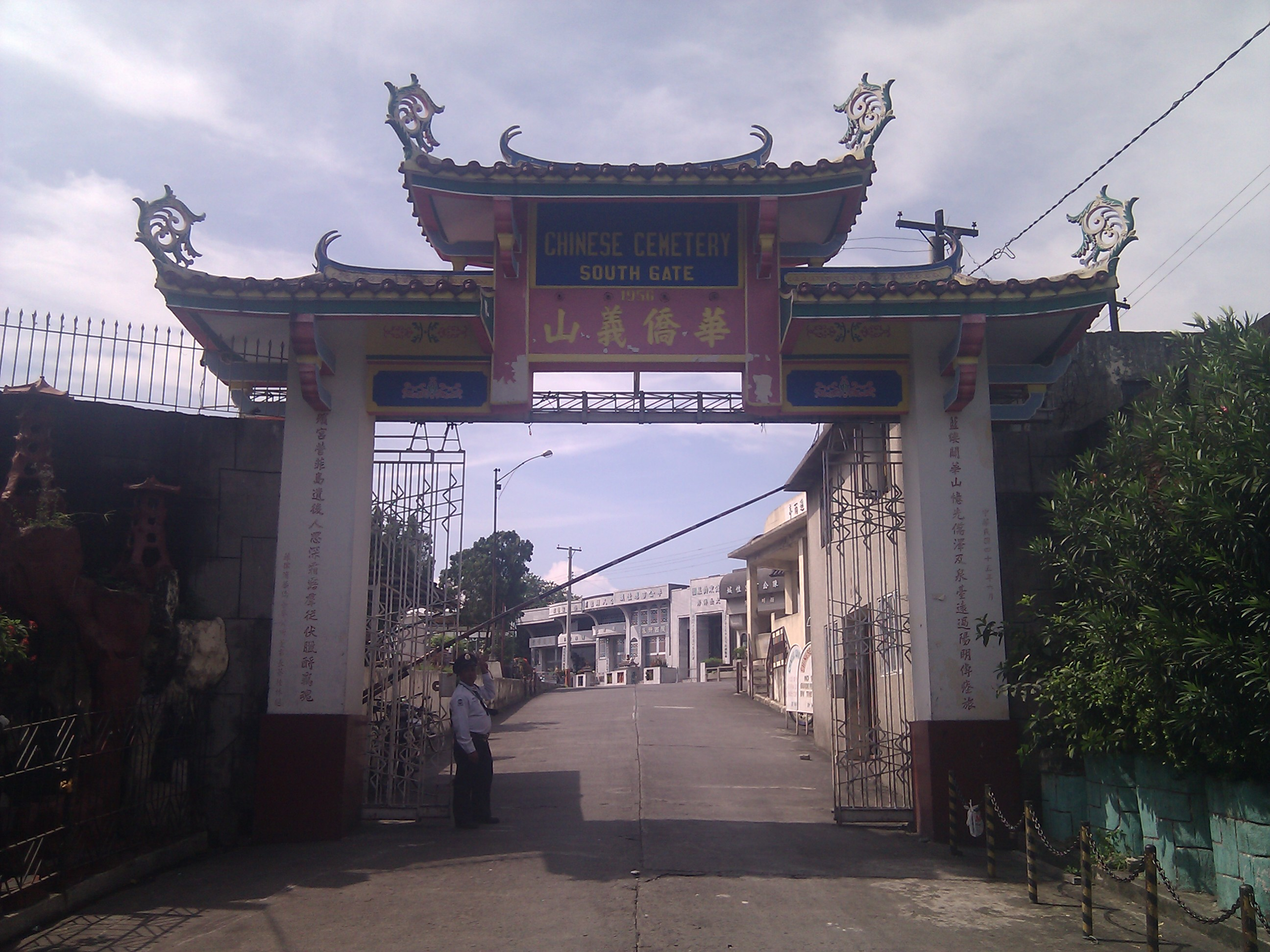
Manila Chinese Cemetery

=== Commercial establishments ===
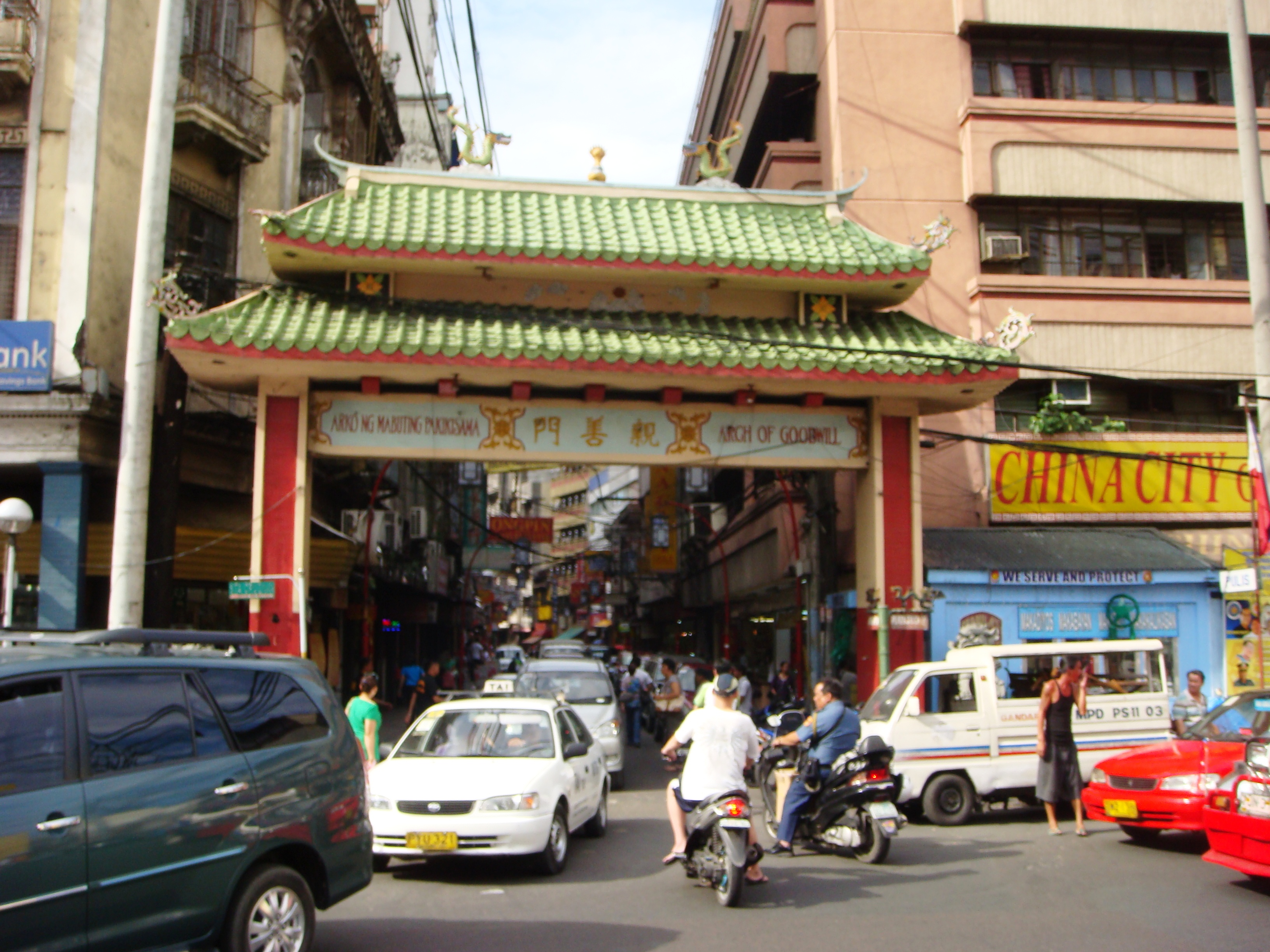
Chinatown (Plaza Santa Cruz), Third Welcome Gate (Arch of Goodwill) to Ongpin Street towards Binondo

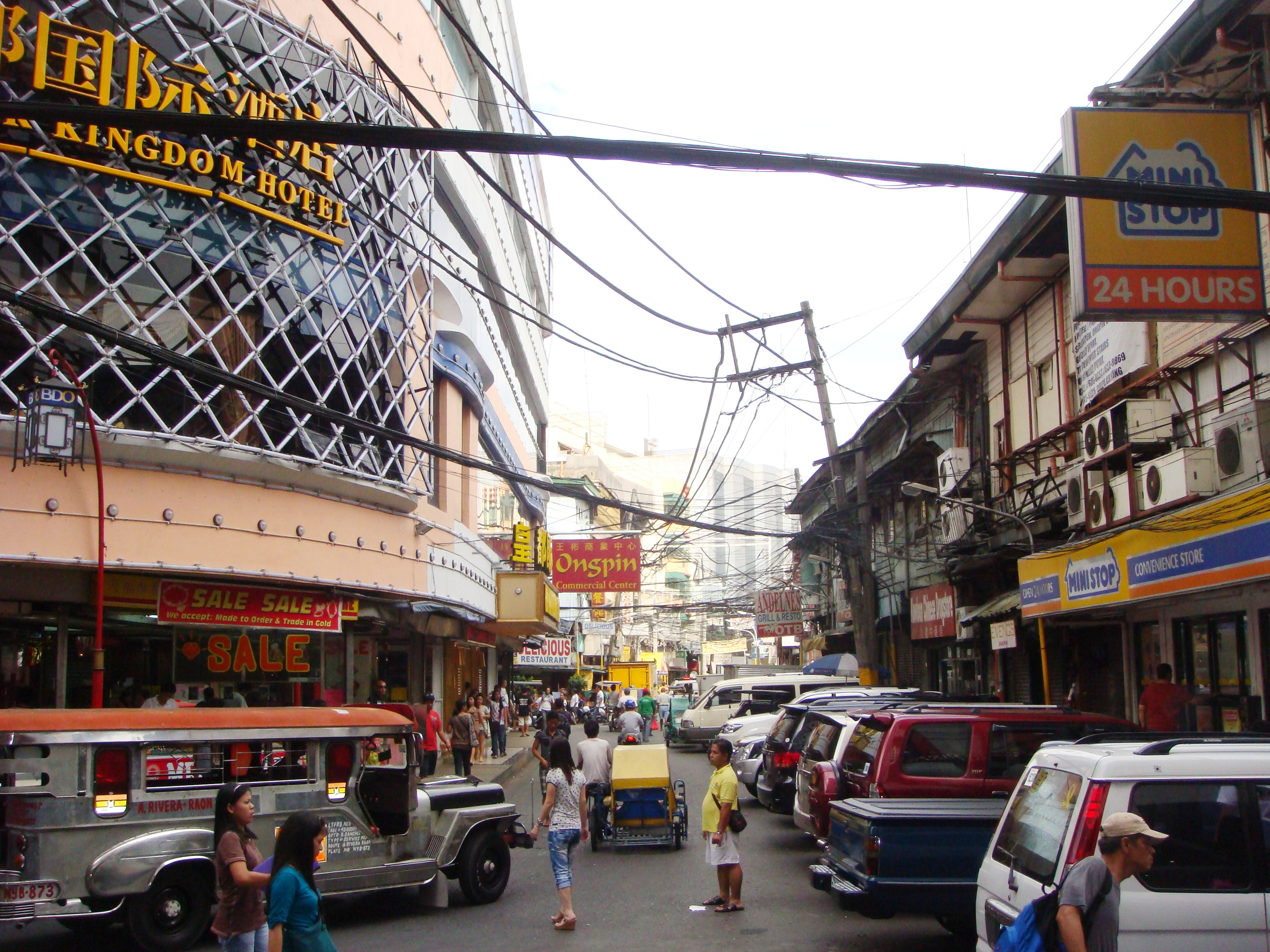
Ongpin Commercial Center

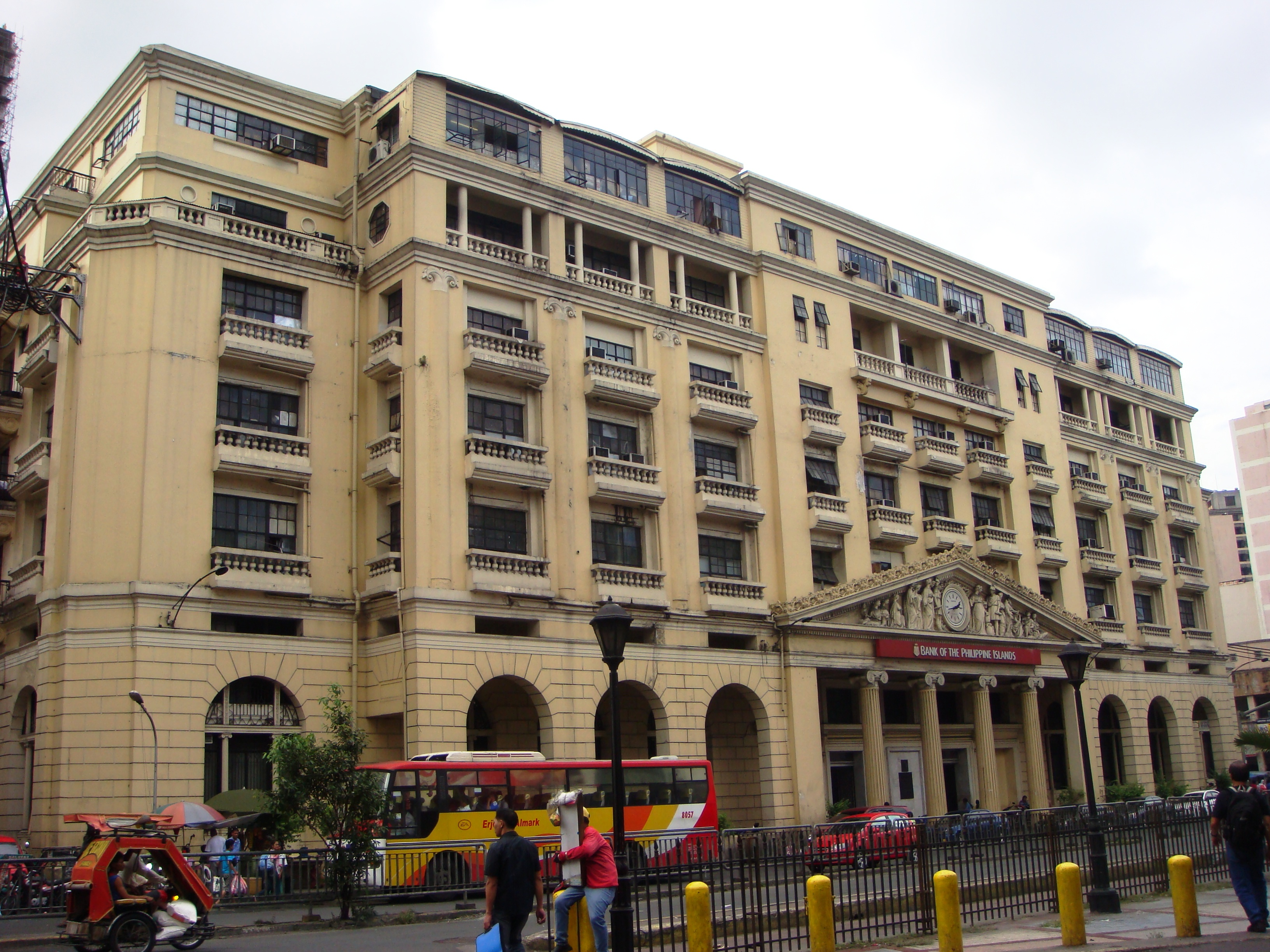
Bank of the Philippine Islands at Don Román Santos Building, a neo-classical, Graeco-Roman structure at Plaza Goiti (now Plaza Lacson)

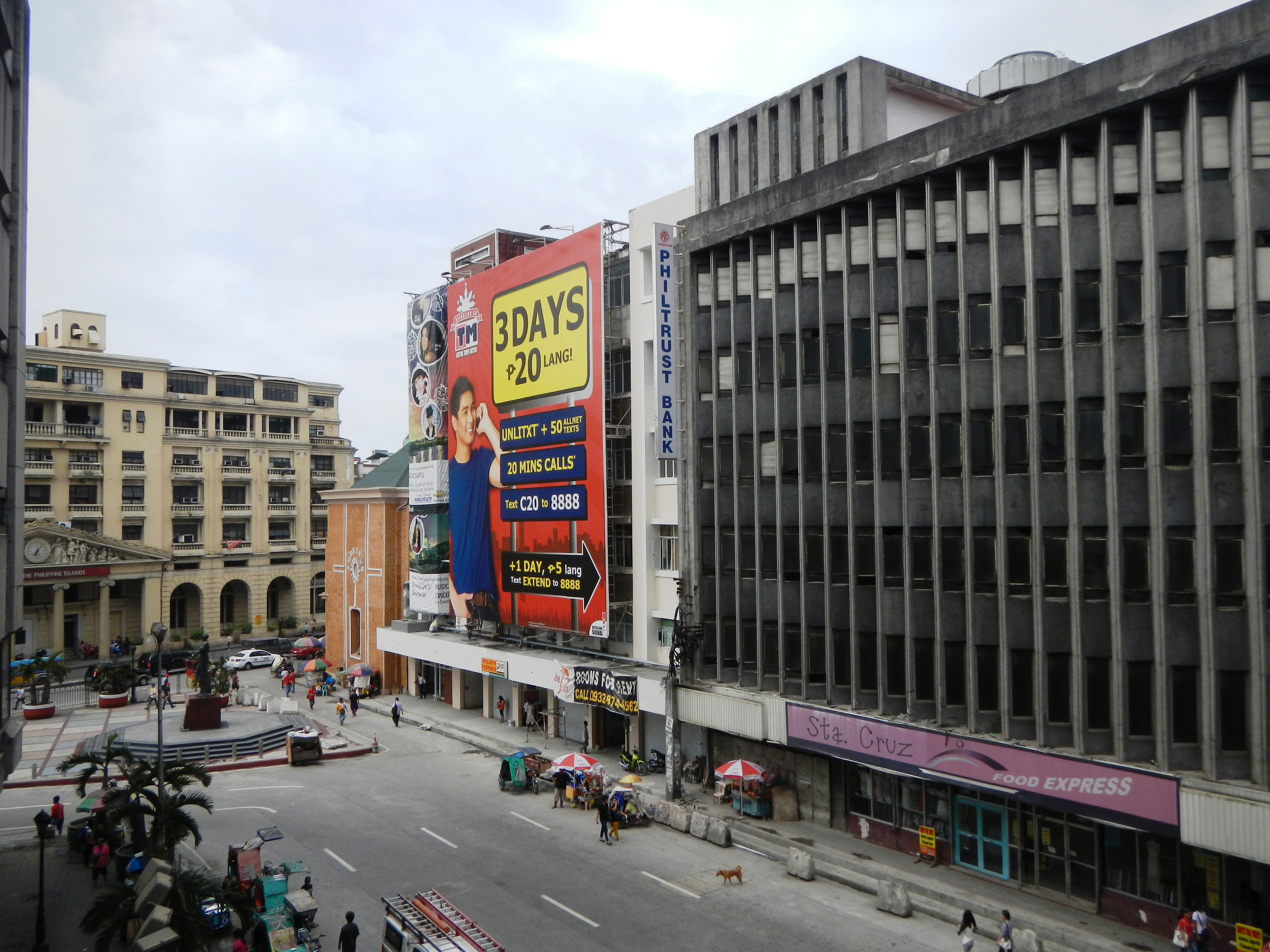
Carriedo Street with Plaza Lacson in the background

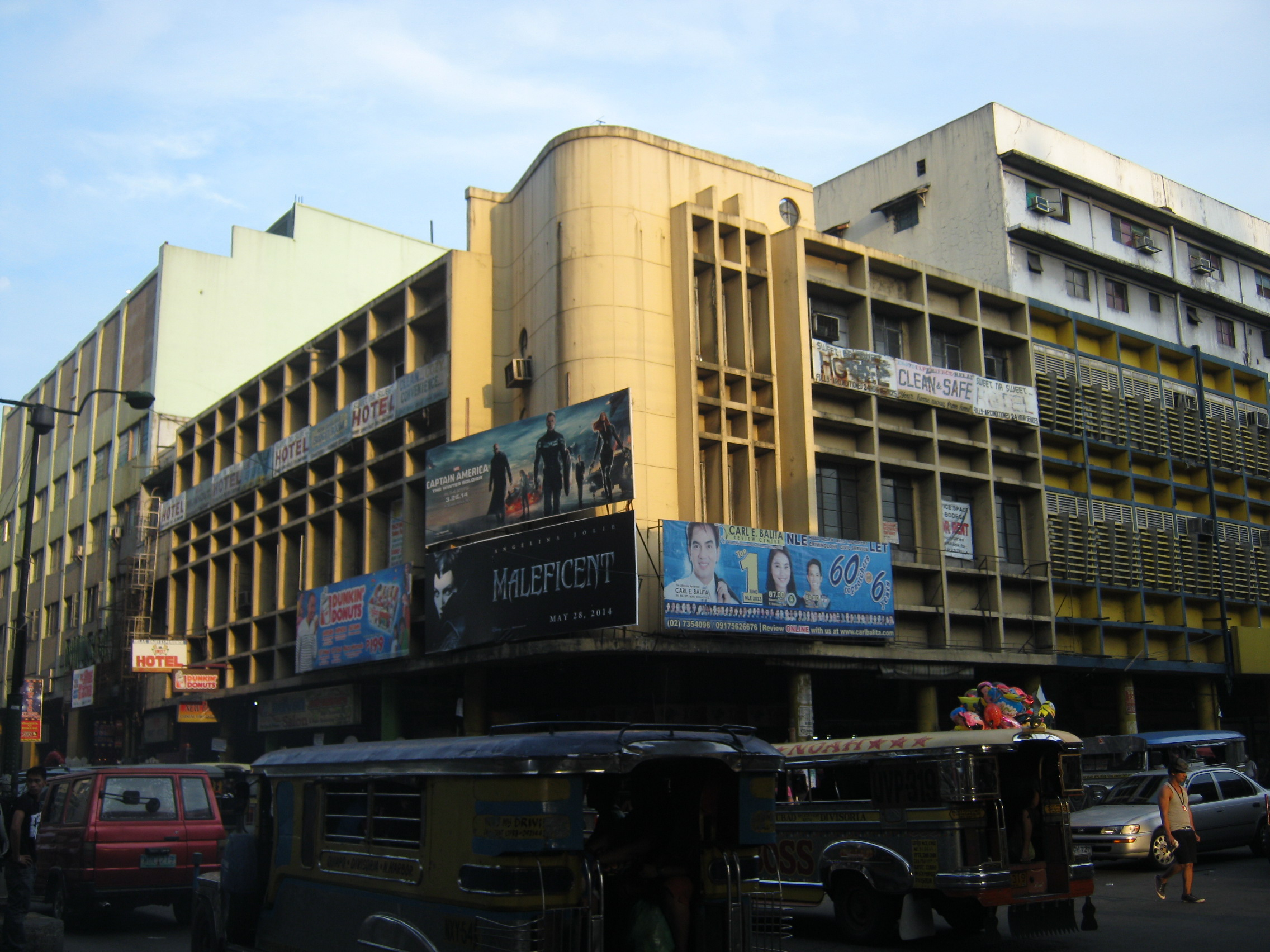
Commercial Buildings in Rizal Avenue

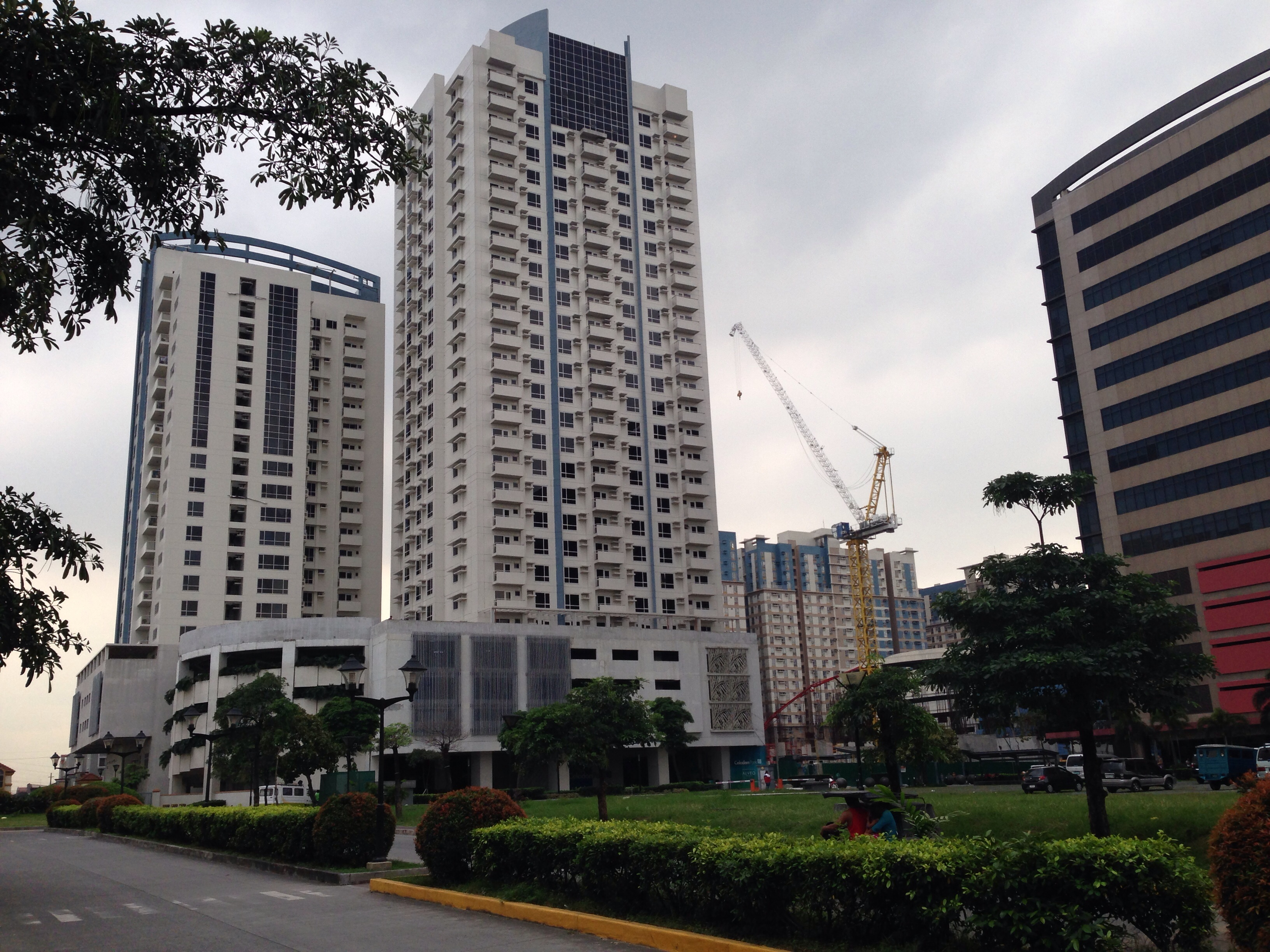
San Lazaro Tourism and Business Park (formerly the San Lázaro Racetrack)

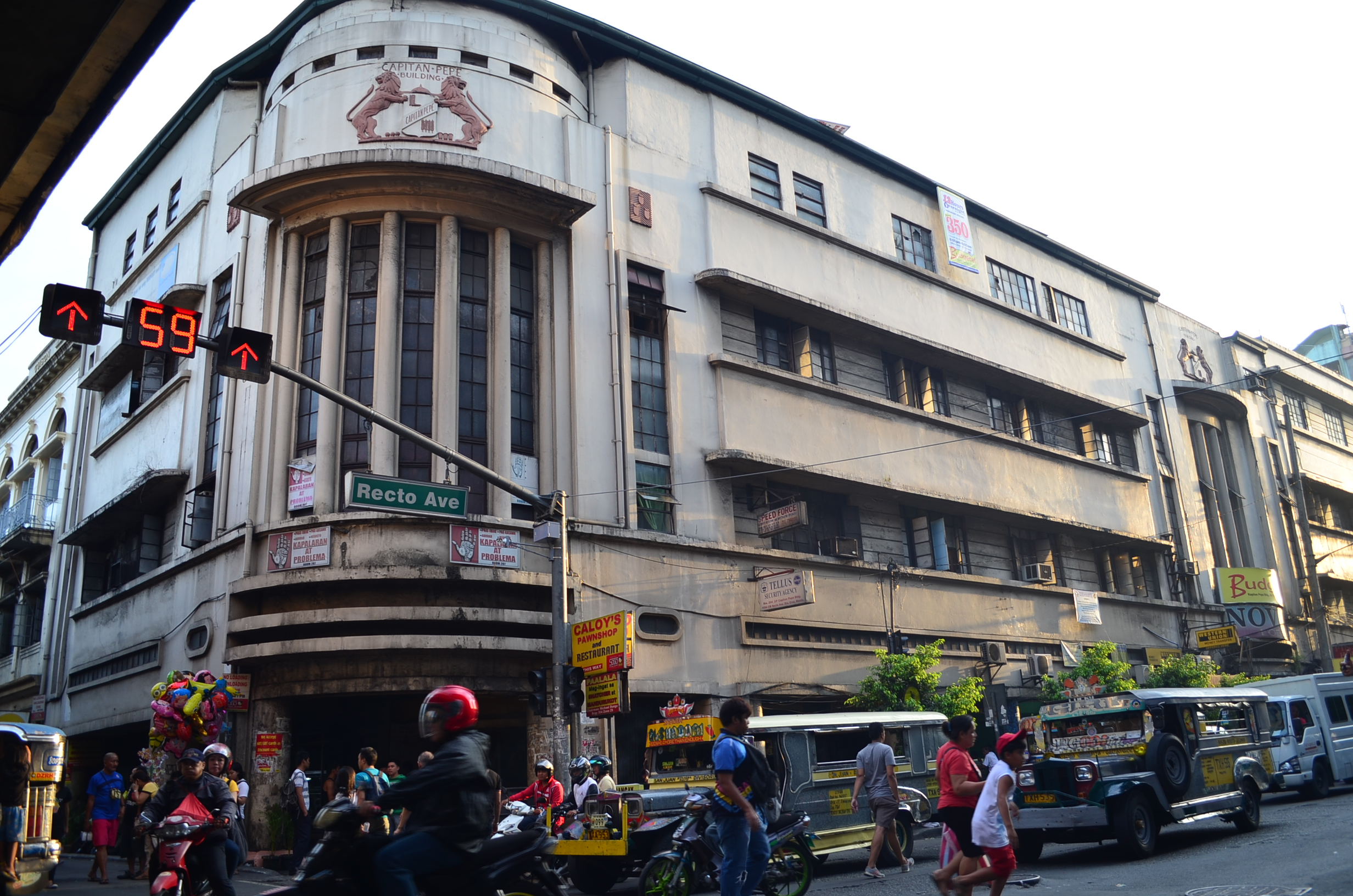
Capitan Pepe Building

=== Residences ===
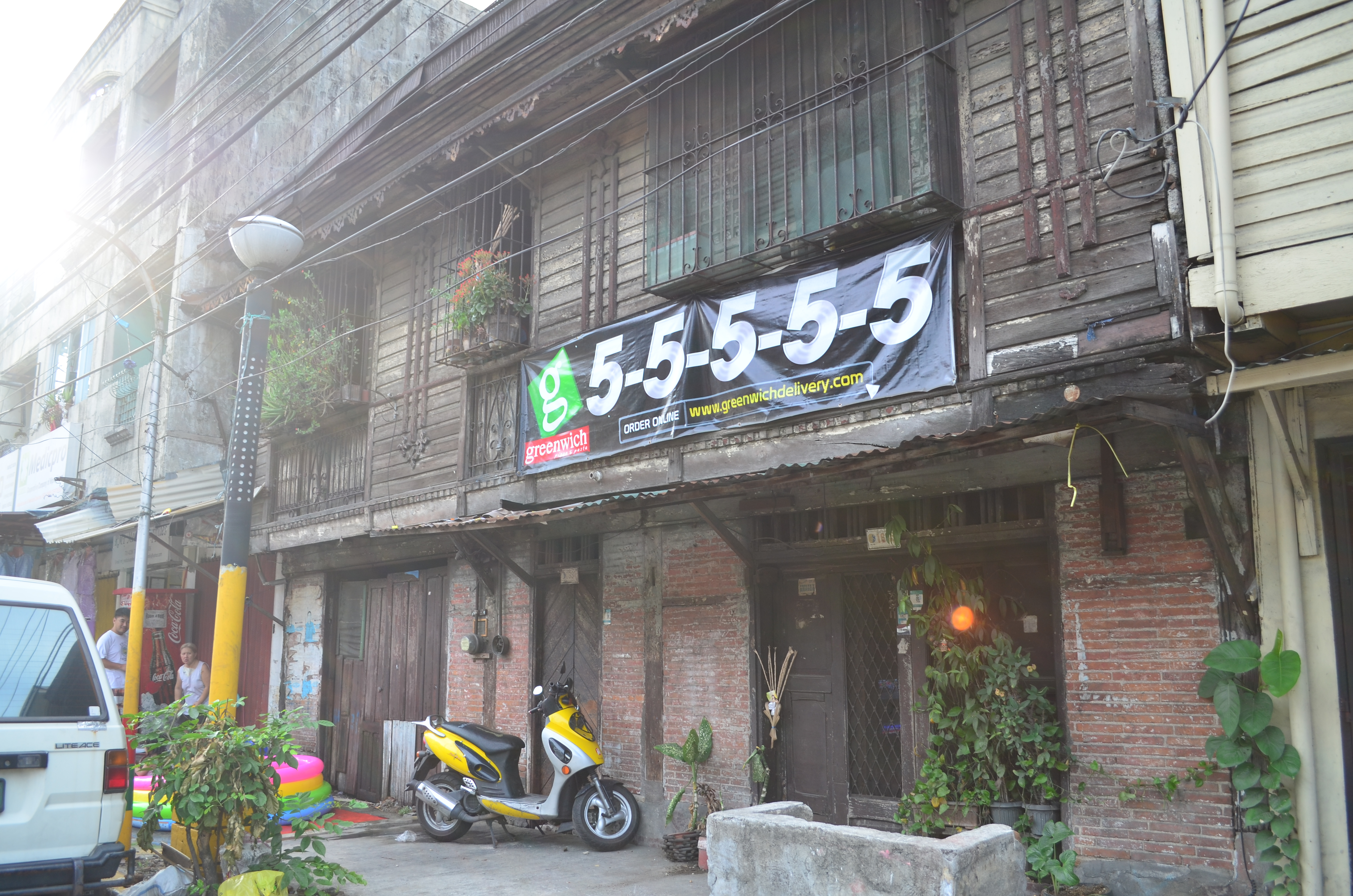
Bahay na bato house in Santa Cruz, Manila

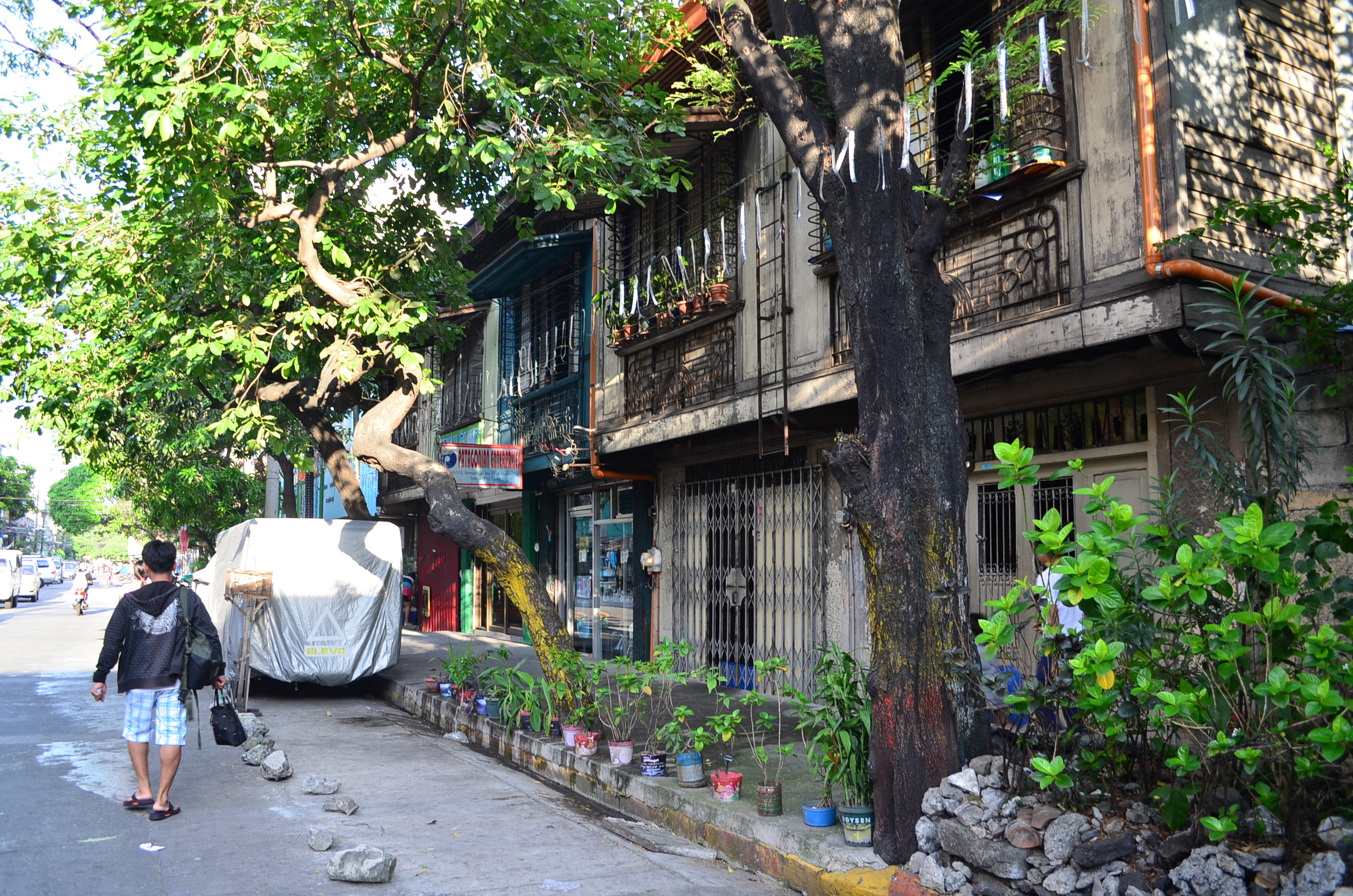
Bahay na bato apartments in Santa Cruz, Manila

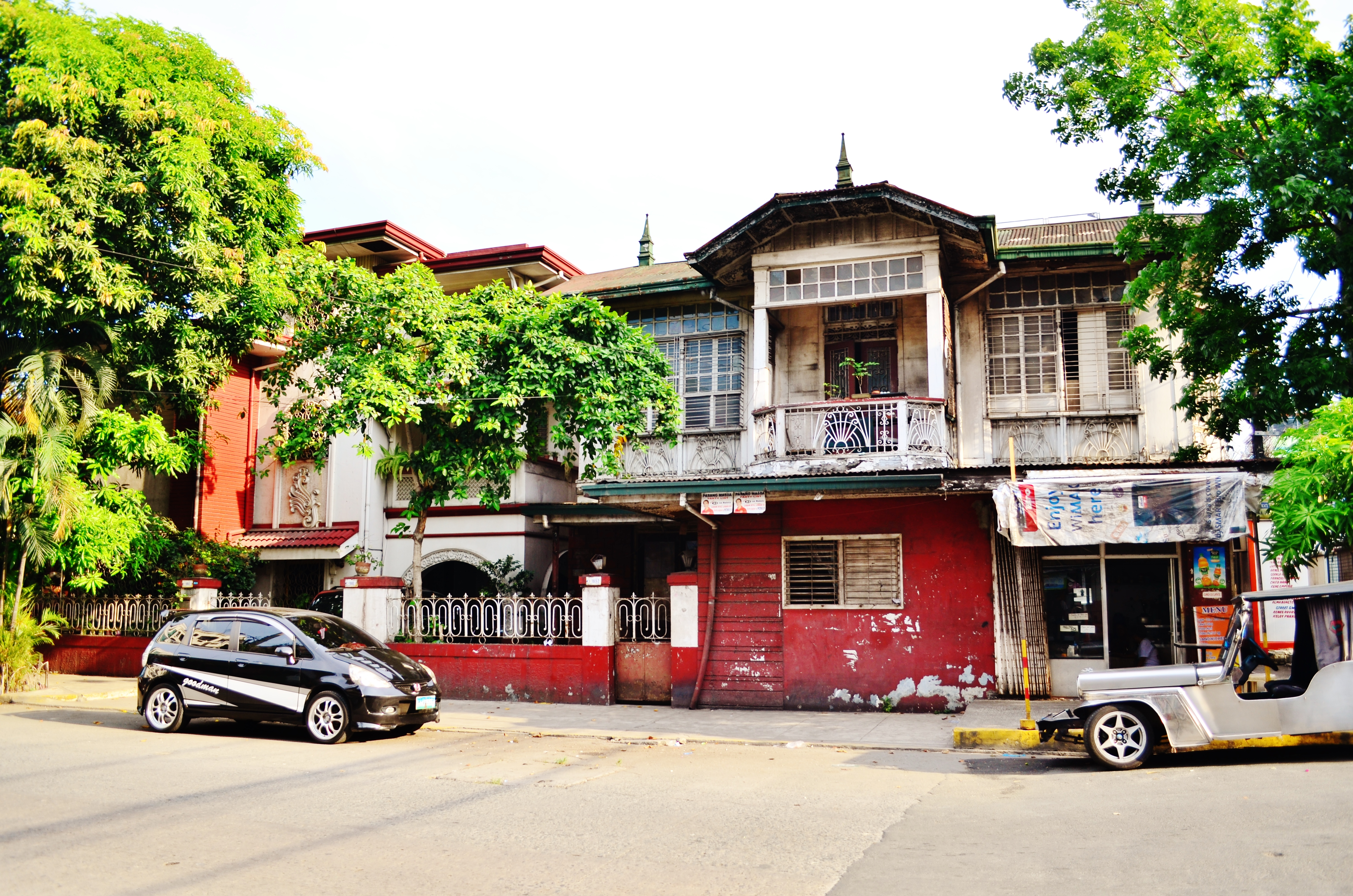
Period architecture in Santa Cruz, Manila

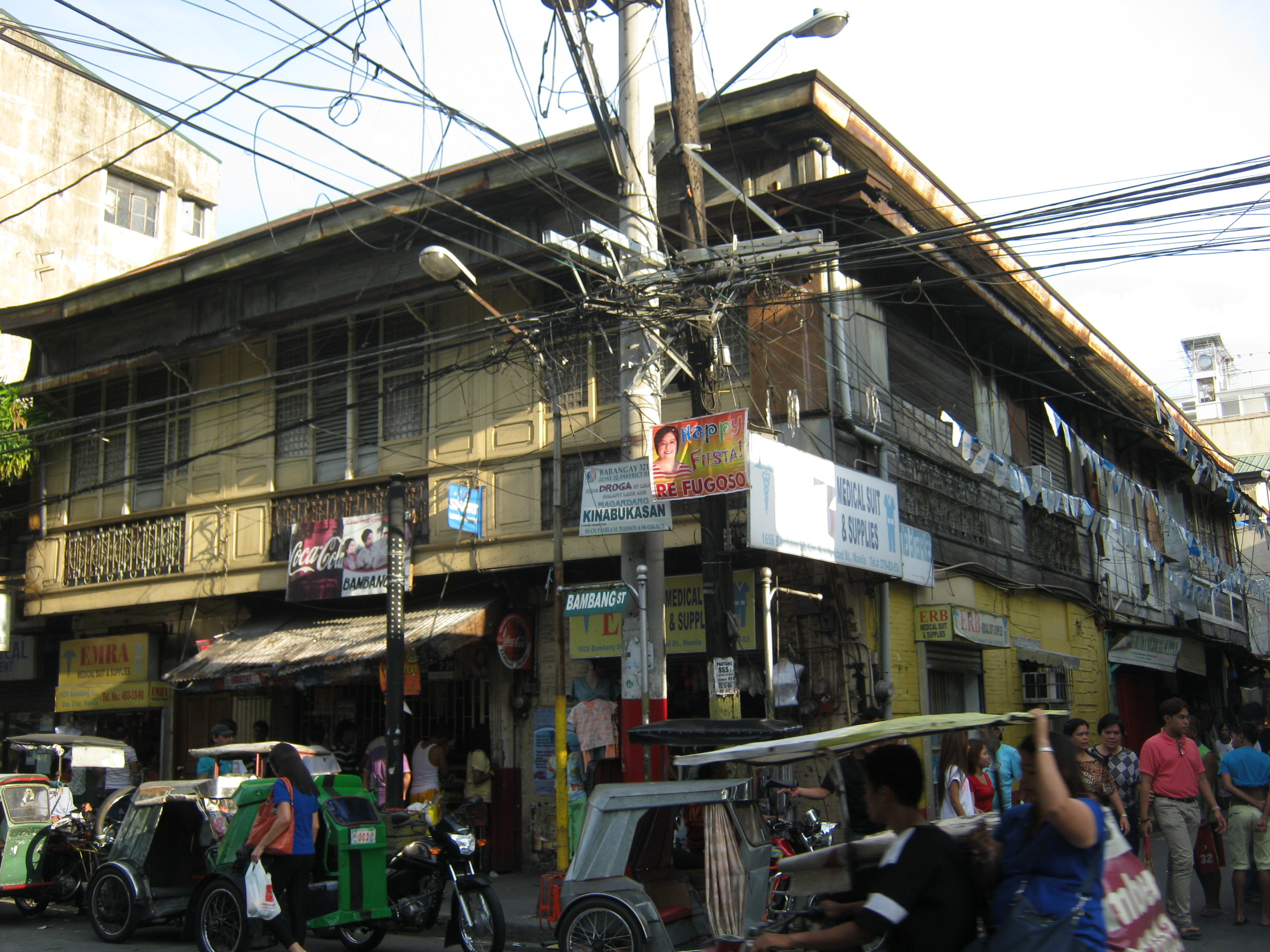
Bahay na Bato House in Bambang Rizal Avenue

== Notable ==
- Sandy Andolong, actress
- Aga Muhlach, actor
- Teodora Alonso Realonda, mother of Jose Rizal
- Coco Martin, actor
- Helen Gamboa, actress
- Mariano Gomez, Catholic priest

== See also ==
- Spanish East Indies
- Spanish Filipino
- Philippine Spanish
- Chavacano
- Captaincy General of the Philippines
