= Cursory Glance =

American-bred Thoroughbred racehorse

- Sire: Distorted Humor
- Grandsire: Forty Niner
- Dam: Time Control
- Damsire: Sadler's Wells
- Sex: Mare
- Foaled: 11 February 2012
- Country: United States
- Colour: Bay
- Breeder: Merry Fox Stud
- Owner: Merry Fox Stud
- Trainer: Roger Varian
- Record: 4: 3-1-0
- Earnings: £219,858

Major wins
- Albany Stakes (2014); Moyglare Stud Stakes (2014)

Cursory Glance (foaled 11 February 2012) is an American-bred, British-trained Thoroughbred racehorse and broodmare. Bred and owned by the Merry Fox Stud, her brief track career consisted of only four races between May and September 2014. After taking a maiden race on her debut she won the Albany Stakes at Royal Ascot and then ran second to Tiggy Wiggy in the Lowther Stakes. On her final racecourse appearance she was sent to Ireland and defeated a very strong field to take the Group 1 Moyglare Stud Stakes. A recurring ankle injury prevented her from racing as a three-year-old and she was retired at the end of 2015.

== Background ==
Cursory Glance is a bay mare with no white markings bred in Kentucky by the British-based Merry Fox Stud. In September 2013 the filly was consigned to the Keeneland September Yearling Sale but failed to reach her reserve price of $150,000. During her track career she was trained by Roger Varian at Newmarket, Suffolk and ridden in all of her races by Andrea Atzeni.

Her sire Distorted Humor was a successful racehorse, but just below top-class, scoring his biggest wins at Grade II level. As a breeding stallion he made an immediate impact by siring Funny Cide in his first crop of foals and went on to get numerous major winners including Drosselmeyer, Commentator, Flower Alley and Any Given Saturday. Cursory Glance's dam Time Control showed modest racing ability, managing one minor win and three placings from six starts, but was well-related, being a daughter of the Musidora Stakes winner Time Away and a full-sister to Time On (Prix de Malleret). She was a female-line descendant of the multiple Group 1 winner Time Charter.

== Racing career ==
=== 2014: two-year-old season ===
Cursory Glance made her debut in a maiden race over six furlongs on the synthetic polytrack surface at Kempton Park Racecourse on 21 May and started the 5/2 favourite against eight other two-year-old fillies. After showing some reluctance to enter the starting stalls she settled in fourth place before making good progress on the outside, taking the lead inside the final furlong, and winning by a length from the Charlie Appleby-trained No Delusion. The filly was then stepped up in class and switched to turf for the Group 3 Albany Stakes at Royal Ascot on 20 June and started at odds of 14/1 in a 21-runner field. The Marygate Stakes winner Patience Alexander started 9/2 joint-favourite alongside the Coolmore representative with the best-fancied of the other fillies being Elite Gardens (from the Godolphin stable and the American challenger Sunset Glow. Cursory Glance overcame a poor start and raced in mid-division as Sunset Glow set the pace. She joined the leaders a furlong out, overtook the American filly in the closing stages, and accelerated away to win by two lengths.

On 21 August at York Racecourse Cursory Glance was moved up to Group 2 class for the Lowther Stakes and started 11/4 third choice in the betting behind Tiggy Wiggy and Anthem Alexander (Queen Mary Stakes). After racing at the rear of the nine-runner field she made headway in the last quarter mile but never looked likely to threaten the front-running Tiggy Wiggy and finished second, beaten one and a half lengths. The filly was then stepped up to Group 1 level when she was sent to Ireland for the Moyglare Stud Stakes over seven furlongs at the Curragh on 14 September. She was made the 11/8 favourite ahead of Found in a ten-runner field which also included Qualify, Malabar (Prestige Stakes), Osaila (Princess Margaret Stakes), Beach Belle (Fillies' Sprint Stakes) and I Am Beautiful (Grangecon Stud Stakes). She tracked the leaders in sixth place before going to the front approaching the final furlong. She was strongly pressed in the closing stages but held on to win by a neck and half a length from Lucida and Found with Malabar and Osaila just behind in fourth and fifth. Roger Varian, who had won the St Leger a day earlier with Kingston Hill said "Andrea felt she was running a bit lazy, and when he gave her a squeeze she took off. Perhaps she ended up in front a bit too long but it was a funny race. She has tremendous natural speed, is very talented and gets this trip well. She is a Group One winner now and that will probably be it for this season. Hopefully she will have a massive year next year. It has been a magical weekend and has not really sunk in yet" After the race bookmakers made Cursory Glance the 8/1 ante-post favourite for the following year's 1000 Guineas.

=== Retirement ===
An ankle injury prevented Cursory Glance from competing in the early part of 2015. When the injury recurred in August her owners decided to retire her from racing. Roger Varian commented "It is a huge shame that she didn't get a chance to showcase her exceptional talent on the racecourse this season... The form of her win in the Moyglare has been franked consistently throughout this year. The work she has shown us on the gallops at home this season gives me every reason to think that she would also be a Group 1 winner at three–sadly it was not to be".

== Breeding record ==
Following her retirement from racing Cursory Glance became a broodmare for the Merry Fox Stud. In December 2015 it was reported that Cursory Glance would be covered by War Front in 2016.

== Pedigree ==
Pedigree of Cursory Glance, bay mare, 2012
Sire Distorted Humor (USA) 1993	Forty Niner (USA); 1985	Mr. Prospector	Raise a Native
Sire Distorted Humor (USA) 1993	Forty Niner (USA); 1985	Mr. Prospector	Gold Digger
Sire Distorted Humor (USA) 1993	Forty Niner (USA); 1985	File	Tom Rolfe
Sire Distorted Humor (USA) 1993	Forty Niner (USA); 1985	File	Continue
Sire Distorted Humor (USA) 1993	Danzig's Beauty (USA); 1987	Danzig	Northern Dancer
Sire Distorted Humor (USA) 1993	Danzig's Beauty (USA); 1987	Danzig	Pas De Nom
Sire Distorted Humor (USA) 1993	Danzig's Beauty (USA); 1987	Sweetest Chant	Mr. Leader
Sire Distorted Humor (USA) 1993	Danzig's Beauty (USA); 1987	Sweetest Chant	Gay Sonnet
Dam Time Control (GB) 2005	Sadler's Wells (USA); 1981	Northern Dancer	Nearctic
Dam Time Control (GB) 2005	Sadler's Wells (USA); 1981	Northern Dancer	Natalma
Dam Time Control (GB) 2005	Sadler's Wells (USA); 1981	Fairy Bridge	Bold Reason
Dam Time Control (GB) 2005	Sadler's Wells (USA); 1981	Fairy Bridge	Special
Dam Time Control (GB) 2005	Time Away (IRE); 1998	Darshaan	Shirley Heights
Dam Time Control (GB) 2005	Time Away (IRE); 1998	Darshaan	Delsy
Dam Time Control (GB) 2005	Time Away (IRE); 1998	Not Before Time	Polish Precedent
Dam Time Control (GB) 2005	Time Away (IRE); 1998	Not Before Time	Time Charter (Family: 22-a)

- Cursory Glance was inbred 3 × 4 to Northern Dancer, meaning that this stallion appears in both the third and fourth generations of her pedigree.
