= Flower Alley =

American-bred Thoroughbred racehorse

- Sire: Distorted Humor
- Dam: Princess Olivia
- Damsire: Lycius
- Sex: Stallion
- Foaled: 2002
- Country: USA
- Colour: Chestnut
- Breeder: George Brunacini & Bona Terra Farms
- Owner: Eugene Melnyk
- Trainer: Todd Pletcher
- Record: 13:5-3-1
- Earnings: $2,533,910

Major wins
- Travers Stakes (2005); Lane's End Stakes (2005); Jim Dandy Stakes (2005); Salvator Mile Handicap (2006)
- Last updated on Sept 15, 2006

Flower Alley (foaled May 7, 2002) is an American Thoroughbred racehorse and sire. Winner of the Travers Stakes during his racing career, he is best known as the sire of 2012 Kentucky Derby and Preakness Stakes winner I'll Have Another.

== Background ==
Flower Alley was bred in Kentucky by George Brunacini's Bona Terra Farms. A chestnut horse, he has a small white star on his forehead and a small white sock on his back right leg. At maturity, he stood 16.1 hands high.

Breeder George Brunacini was notably killed in the August 27, 2006, crash of Comair Flight 5191 at Blue Grass Airport in Lexington, Kentucky.

Flower Alley is a son of Distorted Humor, a Mr. Prospector line sire whose other offspring includes dual classic winner and champion Funny Cide and Belmont Stakes and Breeders' Cup Classic winner Drosselmeyer. Flower Alley is inbred 3×3 to Mr. Prospector.

His dam, Princess Olivia, is sired by Lycius, who won the Gr.I Middle Park Stakes as a juvenile.

Flower Alley was bought by the Melnyk Racing Stables of Eugene Melnyk for $165,000 at the 2003 Keeneland September yearling sale. Eugene Melnyk's daughter is named Olivia, and selected Flower Alley from the sale because of his dam's name.

== Racing career ==
=== Two-year-old season ===
Flower Alley made his racing debut in December 2004 at Calder, finishing third in a maiden race. It was his only run as a juvenile.

=== Three-year-old season ===
Flower Alley won the Grade II Jim Dandy Stakes, the Grade II Lane's End Stakes (in his third career start), and, on August 27, the Grade I Travers Stakes at Saratoga as a sophomore. He was trained by Saratoga's leading trainer, Todd Pletcher, and was ridden in the Travers by top jockey John Velazquez. Flower Alley was second to Eclipse Award for Horse of the Year winner Saint Liam in the Breeders' Cup Classic on October 30, 2005.

Flower Alley spent his 2005 winter break in Ocala, Florida, at his owner's Winding Oaks Farm, then trained at Churchill Downs for an early summer return to the track.

=== Four-year-old season ===
Flower Alley, under his Travers Stakes jockey John Velazquez (who skipped his Saturday Belmont mounts to ride the four-year-old), came back to the races as the favorite to win the Grade III $150,000 Salvator Mile Handicap at Monmouth Park in Oceanport, New Jersey, on June 24, 2006. It was a 3 1/4 -length victory as the 1–2 favorite. Out of 11 starts, he had now won 5, placed three times, and showed once. With that win in the slop, his earnings totaled more than $2,500,000.

After the Salvator Mile, Todd Pletcher said, "We'll go to the Whitney Stakes on August 5th now, if everything goes smoothly." Pletcher also planned to run Flower Alley in Saratoga's G1 Woodward Stakes as well as the Breeder's Cup Classic, run this year at Churchill Downs.

On August 5, 2006, Invasor, an Argentine-bred son of Candy Stripes, won the Whitney by a nose to the surging Sun King. Flower Alley, a joint favorite in the race, made a brief run at the leading horses, then faded to come home seventh. Flower Alley also failed to hit the board in the Woodward Stakes, again finishing seventh.

He finished 11th in the November 2006 Breeders' Cup Classic at Churchill Downs, which was the last race of his career. He was retired after the race with a record of 14: 5-3-1 and earnings of $2,533,910.

== Stud career ==
In 2007, Flower Alley began his career as a stallion at Three Chimneys Farm, alongside Point Given, Rahy, Albert the Great, Big Brown. The Midway, Kentucky, farm had acquired a 50% ownership of Flower Alley, the second graded stakes winner by Distorted Humor to stand at stud.

In May 2012, Flower Alley's son I'll Have Another won the Kentucky Derby and Preakness Stakes, bringing his status as a stallion into the spotlight. After his son's accomplishments on the track, Flower Alley's stud fee was raised to $20,000; a big increase from his $7,500 price tag of recent years.

In 2015, however, despite his recent success as a stallion, Flower Alley was sold to stand at Wilgerbosdrift Stud in South Africa. He currently resides there, alongside United States Gr. III winner Fire Away, a grandson of Personal Ensign.

Flower Alley's most notable progeny includes:

- I'll Have Another: Winner of the 2012 Kentucky Derby, Preakness Stakes, Robert B. Lewis Stakes and Santa Anita Derby
- Bullards Alley: Winner of the 2017 Canadian International Stakes and Louisville Handicap
- My Wandy's Girl: Winner of the Barbara Fritchie Handicap, Clasico Accion de Gracias (PR-G1), Dia de los Padres Stakes (PR-G1), and Roberto Clemente Stakes (PR-G1)
- Lilacs and Lace: Winner of the Ashland Stakes and California Oaks
- Neck 'N Neck: Winner of the Indiana Derby, Matt Winn Stakes, Ack Ack Handicap, and Greenwood Cup Stakes
- Lukes Alley: Winner of the Gulfstream Park Turf Handicap, Autumn Stakes, and Durham Cup Stakes
- Bouquet Booth: Winner of the Delta Downs Princess Stakes and Silverbulletday Stakes

Flower Alley has also found success as a broodmare sire. He is the broodmare sire of:

- Lucky Lilac: Winner of the Ōsaka Hai, Queen Elizabeth II Cup (Japan), Hanshin Juvenile Fillies, and Tulip Sho. She was awarded the JRA Award for Best Two-Year-Old Filly in 2017. Lucky Lilac is a daughter of Lilacs and Lace.
- Daisy: Winner of the Tempted Stakes
- Smooth Like Strait: Winner of the Cecil B. DeMille Stakes
