= 2012 Preakness Stakes =

137th running of the Preakness Stakes

137th Preakness Stakes
- The Preakness Stakes
- "The Middle Jewel of the Triple Crown" "The Run for the Black-Eyed Susans"
- Location: Pimlico Race Course, Baltimore, Maryland, United States
- Date: May 19, 2012
- Winning horse: I'll Have Another
- Winning time: 1:55.94
- Final odds: 3.2-1
- Jockey: Mario Gutierrez
- Trainer: Doug O'Neill
- Conditions: Fast
- Surface: Dirt
- Attendance: ▲121,309

The 2012 Preakness Stakes was the 137th running of the Preakness Stakes thoroughbred horse race. The race took place on May 19, 2012, and was televised in the United States on the NBC television network. The post time was 6:20 p.m. EDT (10:20 p.m. UTC). I'll Have Another won the second leg of the Triple Crown, narrowly defeating Bodemeister in a last-furlong push.

The Maryland Jockey Club report a record crowd of 121,309, the second highest attendance for American thoroughbred racing events in North America during 2012.

I'll Have Another became the 33rd horse to win the Kentucky Derby and Preakness Stakes double.

== Payout ==
The 137th Preakness Payout Schedule

| Program Number | Horse Name | Win | Place | Show |
|---|---|---|---|---|
| 9 | I'll Have Another | US$8.40 | $3.80 | $2.80 |
| 7 | Bodemeister | – | $3.20 | $2.80 |
| 6 | Creative Cause | – | – | $3.60 |

- $2 Exacta: (9–7) paid $18.60
- $2 Trifecta: (9–7–6) paid $70.80
- $1 Superfecta: (9–7–6–4) paid $424.30

== The full chart ==
The post draw was televised on the Horse Racing TeleVision network (HRTV) on May 17, 2012, at 6:00 p.m.EDT.

Both the winner of the 2012 Kentucky Derby, I'll Have Another and the second placed horse Bodemeister entered the race. Also back from the Derby were fourth-place finisher Went the Day Well and fifth-place finisher Creative Cause, as well as Daddy Nose Best, who placed tenth, and Optimizer, who took 11th at the Derby.

Bodemeister was the 8/5 morning-line favorite and I'll Have Another was the 5/2 second choice.

Kent Desormeaux the original named rider of Tiger Walk was removed after failing a breathalyzer test in New York and replaced by Ramon Dominguez.

| Finish Position | Margin (lengths) | Post Position | Horse name | Jockey | Trainer | Owner | Morning Line Odds | Post Time Odds | Purse Earnings |
|---|---|---|---|---|---|---|---|---|---|
| 1st | 0 | 9 | I'll Have Another | Mario Gutierrez | Doug O'Neill | J. Paul Reddam | 5-2 | 3.20 | $600,000 |
| 2nd | neck | 7 | Bodemeister | Mike E. Smith | Bob Baffert | Zayat Sables | 8-5 favorite | 1.70 favorite | $200,000 |
| 3rd | 9 | 6 | Creative Cause | Joel Rosario | Mike Harrington | Mike & Tiffany Moreno | 6-1 | 6.30 | $110,000 |
| 4th | 12 | 4 | Zetterholm | Junior Alvarado | Richard E. Dutrow | Heinz Steinmann | 20-1 | 20.50 | $60,000 |
| 5th | 151/4 | 2 | Teeth of the Dog | Joe Bravo | Michael Matz | Winter Park Partners | 15-1 | 15.50 | $30,000 |
| 6th | 151/2 | 10 | Optimizer | Corey Nakatani | D. Wayne Lukas | Bluegrass Hall | 30-1 | 23.30 | |
| 7th | 173/4 | 11 | Cozzetti | Jose Lezcano | Dale Romans | Albaugh Stables | 30-1 | 27.30 | |
| 8th | 25 | 1 | Tiger Walk | Ramon Dominguez | Ignacio Correas IV | Sagamore Farm | 30-1 | 23.40 | |
| 9th | 271/4 | 8 | Daddy Nose Best | Julien Leparoux | Steven Asmussen | Bob & Cathy Zollars | 12-1 | 11.10 | |
| 10th | 301/2 | 5 | Went the Day Well | John R. Velazquez | H. Graham Motion | Team Valor | 6-1 | 5.70 | |
| 11th | 341/4 | 3 | Pretension | Javier Santiago | Christopher Grove | Kidwell Petite Stable | 30-1 | 33.70 | |

- Winning Breeder: Harvey Clarke; (KY)
- Final Time – 1:55:94
- Track – Fast
- Attendance - 121,309

== See also ==
- 2012 Kentucky Derby
- 2012 Belmont Stakes
