= Distorted Humor =

American-bred Thoroughbred racehorse (1993–2026)

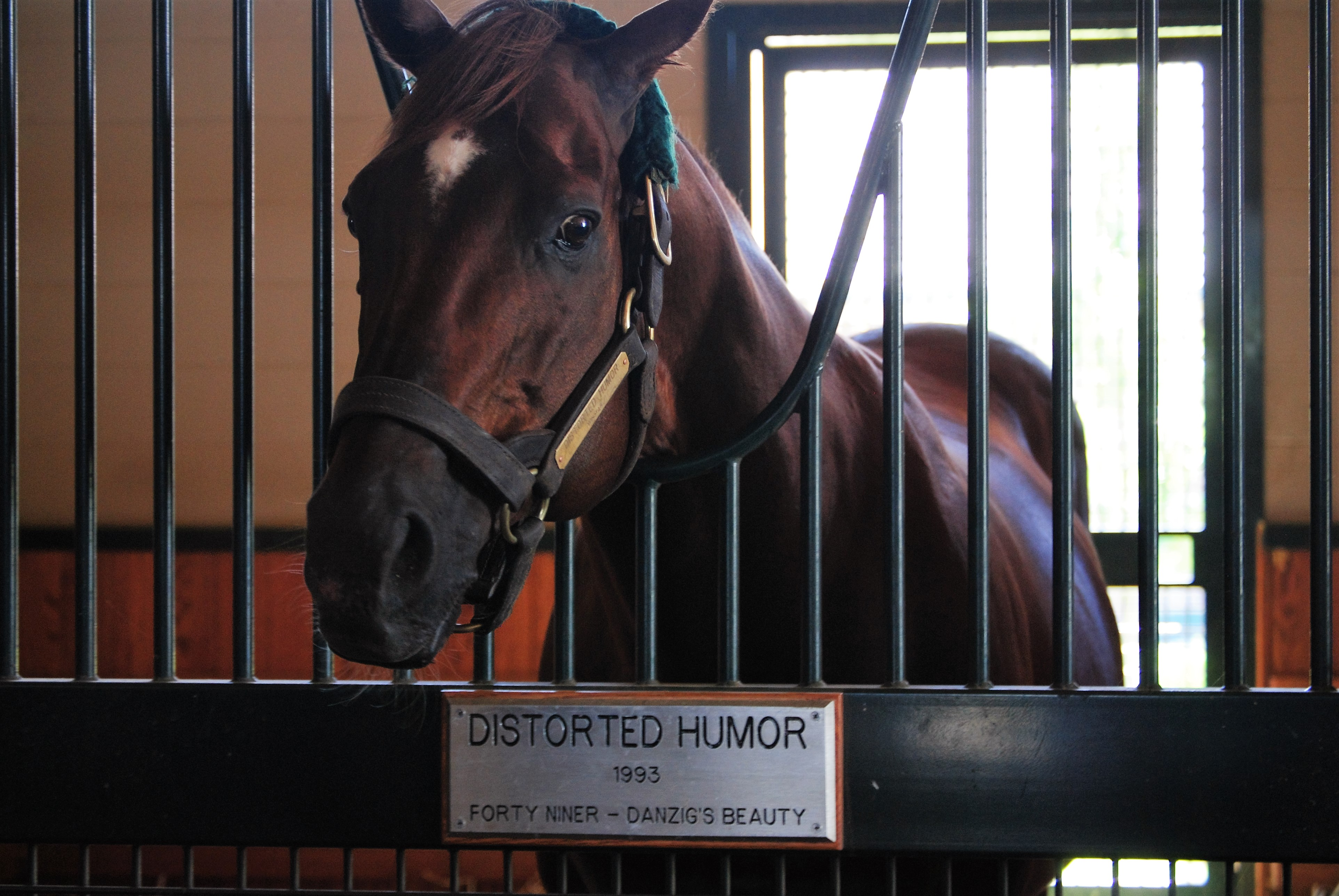
- Distorted Humor in 2015
- Sire: Forty Niner
- Grandsire: Mr. Prospector
- Dam: Danzig's Beauty
- Damsire: Danzig
- Sex: Stallion
- Foaled: March 19, 1993; Kentucky, U.S.
- Died: January 10, 2026 (aged 32)
- Country: United States
- Colour: Chestnut
- Breeder: Nuckols Farm, Inc.
- Owner: Russell L. Reineman Stable & Prestonwood Farm
- Trainer: Phil Gleaves; W. Elliott Walden
- Record: 23: 8–5–3
- Earnings: $769,964

Major wins
- Amsterdam Stakes (1996); Salvator Mile Handicap (1997); Commonwealth Breeders' Cup Stakes (1998); Churchill Downs Stakes (1998); Ack Ack Handicap (1998)

Awards
- Leading American sire (2011); Leading broodmare sire in North America (2017)

Distorted Humor (March 19, 1993 – January 10, 2026) was an American Thoroughbred racehorse and a successful sire.

== Bloodline ==
Distorted Humor's sire was Forty Niner, 1987's Eclipse Award-winning Outstanding Two-Year-Old Male Horse by the champion sire, Mr. Prospector. Distorted Humor's dam was Danzig's Beauty by Danzig. Distorted Humor was her second foal. Danzig's Beauty died June 17, 2006, at the age of 19 due to colic. She'd given birth in April 2006, to her last foal, a filly by Empire Maker.

== Racing career ==
Distorted Humor himself had a career running middle-distance stakes races. He broke his maiden at Florida's Gulfstream Park and was initially trained by Phil Gleaves as a sprinter/miler. Elliott Walden took over training duties in the spring of 1996 after Prestonwood Farm purchased a half-interest in Distorted Humor. Distorted Humor's career race record was 8 wins, 5 places, and 3 shows in 23 starts, with earnings of $769,964. As a three-year-old, he won the Screen King Stakes, was second in the Grade III Fayette Stakes and the Grade II Jerome Handicap, and finished 3rd in the Grade III King's Bishop Stakes. At four, he took the Grade III Salvator Mile Handicap, and was second in the Grade III Kentucky Cup Classic Stakes and the Grade III Philip H. Iselin Handicap. At five, he took the Grade II Commonwealth Breeders' Cup Stakes (setting the record for the distance that still holds), the Grade II Churchill Downs Stakes, and the Grade III Ack Ack Handicap before he was retired.

At maturity, he reached 15.3 hands (63 inches, 160 cm).

== Success as a sire ==
Beginning in 1999, Distorted Humor stood twice in Victoria, Australia, (at Grand Lodge Stud in Avenel) for $12,000. He sired two Australian crops. In those crops, 93 foals were runners, 74 were winners, 12 placed, and two others came in the money. His get includes Rinky Dink: winner of the South Australian Oaks and the Tasmanian Oaks, Distorted Halo: winner of the Moonee Valley and Mercedes-Benz Hong Kong Derby Trial, and Tirade: winner of the Caulfield Guineas Prelude and third in the VRC Ascot Vale Stakes. Among his Australian winners are both flat runners and jumpers. One jumper, four-year-old Some Are Bent, took the Moonee Valley Hurdle in July 2006, his third jumps win in his past four outings.

Back in the United States, Distorted Humor's 2000 fee remained low and his mares average, yet he became America's leading freshman sire of 2002. In 2003, his son Funny Cide won the Kentucky Derby and Preakness Stakes, and Awesome Humor was a Grade I winner.

In 2005, Distorted Humor's oldest foals were five-year-olds. Over the course of 140 races, 88 of his crop (13 of which were two-year-olds) earned $8.6 million. He finished the year as the second top sire in America, beaten only by Saint Ballado. By late 2006, he had 255 winners, including 18 graded stakes winners, from 340 starters and sired 46 stakes winners. From five crops, his progeny have earned $30,265,433. In 2006, as a 14-year-old sire, he had 20 different horses win a combined 31 stakes races, 10 of which were graded.

In 2008, Distorted Humor produced at least 20 stakes winners for the second year in a row. For the third straight year, he ranked among the top six stallions by progeny earnings. For 2007, he ranked third behind Smart Strike (sire of Curlin and English Channel) and A.P. Indy. 2011 was his best year as he earned the title of Leading sire in North America, thanks in part to Belmont Stakes winner Drosselmeyer.

"Distorted Humor's progeny inherit the will to win, the desire; a lot like Storm Cat," said WinStar Farm President and CEO Doug Cauthen. "They're always battling. They battle and win or try to win, and that desire tends to get them in the winner's circle."

In October 2021, WinStar Farm announced that Distorted Humor was being retired from stud duty.

As of March 11, 2025, Distorted Humor has sired 173 stakes winners, according to data by The Jockey Club.

== Death ==
Distorted Humour was euthanized on January 10, 2026, at the age of 32.

== Progeny record ==
Standing stud at WinStar Farm in Versailles, Kentucky until 2021, Distorted Humor produced progeny that include:

=== Grade I winners ===
- Funny Cide – 2003 Kentucky Derby, 2003 Preakness, 2004 Jockey Club Gold Cup
- Drosselmeyer – 2010 Belmont Stakes, 2011 Breeders' Cup Classic
- Flower Alley – 2005 Travers Stakes, 2005 Lane's End Stakes, 2005 Jim Dandy Stakes, Sire of I'll Have Another
- Hystericalady – 2006 Hollywood Breeders' Cup Oaks, 2007 Humana Distaff Handicap, 2007 & 2008 Molly Pitcher Breeders' Cup Handicap – 2008 Azeri Stakes, Fleur de Lis Handicap 2008, Delaware Handicap 2008
- Commentator – 2005/2008 Whitney Handicap, 2008 Richter Scale Breeders' Cup Sprint Championship Handicap, 2008 Massachusetts Handicap
- Awesome Humor – 2002 Spinaway Stakes
- Any Given Saturday – 2007 Dwyer Stakes, 2007 Haskell Invitational Handicap, 2007 Brooklyn Handicap
- Rinky Dink – 2004 Australasian Oaks
- Jimmy Creed – 2012 Malibu Stakes
- Boisterous – 2013 Man O' War Stakes
- Cursory Glance – 2014 Moyglare Stud Stakes
- Bit of Whimsy – 2007 Queen Elizabeth II Challenge Cup Stakes, 2007 Mrs. Revere Stakes
- Restless Rider – 2018 Darley Alcibiades
- Santin – 2022 Turf Classic Stakes, Arlington Million

=== Grade II & III winners ===
- Go Rockin' Robin – 2003 Peter Pan Stakes
- Cowtown Cat – 2007 Illinois Derby, 2007 Gotham Stakes
- Da Stoops – 2005 California Breeders' Champion Stakes, 2006 California Cup Sprint, 2006 Sunshine Millions Dash
- Original Spin – 2005 Grade III Arlington-Washington Breeders' Cup Lassie Stakes
- Sensibly Chic – 2005 Vagrancy Handicap
- Sharp Humor – 2006 Swale Stakes
- Forty Niners Son – 2007 San Luis Rey Handicap
- It's No Joke – 2006 Bet on Sunshine Handicap at Churchill Downs, 2006 Grade II Hawthorne Gold Cup Handicap, 2006 Grade III Ack Ack Handicap
- Change Up – 2006 Pocahontas Stakes
- Z Humor – finished first in a dead heat with Turf War in the 2007 running of the Delta Jackpot Stakes
- Regal Ransom – 2009 UAE Derby, 2009 Super Derby
- Justenuffhumor – 2009 Bernard Baruch Handicap
- Endorsement – 2010 Sunland Derby
- Alternation – 2011 Peter Pan Stakes
- Machen – 2011 Derby Trial Stakes
- Brethren – 2011 Sam F. Davis Stakes
- Alternation, 2012 Oaklawn Handicap, 2012 Pimlico Special
- Ironicus – 2015 Grade II Bernard Baruch Handicap, setting new track record at Saratoga
- Anarchist – 2023 Jacques Cartier Stakes, 2023 Pat O'Brien Stakes

Distorted Humor was also the sire of Maclean's Music whose maiden special weight debut at Santa Anita Park produced the current highest debut Beyer figure in history.

== Fees ==
Distorted Humor's fee for 2008 was $300,000—the same fee commanded by A.P. Indy and Storm Cat. Due to the uncertain financial climate beginning in 2008, his fee was reduced to $225,000 for 2009 and $100,000 for 2011. In 2017 his fee was listed by WinStar and Bloodhorse.com as $80,000. In 2021, he was retired from stud duty.

== Pedigree ==
Pedigree of Distorted Humor, chestnut horse, March 19, 1993
Sire Forty Niner 1985	Mr. Prospector; 1970	Raise a Native	Native Dancer
Sire Forty Niner 1985	Mr. Prospector; 1970	Raise a Native	Raise You
Sire Forty Niner 1985	Mr. Prospector; 1970	Gold Digger	Nashua
Sire Forty Niner 1985	Mr. Prospector; 1970	Gold Digger	Sequence
Sire Forty Niner 1985	File; 1976	Tom Rolfe	Ribot
Sire Forty Niner 1985	File; 1976	Tom Rolfe	Pocahontas
Sire Forty Niner 1985	File; 1976	Continue	Double Jay
Sire Forty Niner 1985	File; 1976	Continue	Courtesy
Dam Danzig's Beauty 1987	Danzig; 1977	Northern Dancer	Nearctic
Dam Danzig's Beauty 1987	Danzig; 1977	Northern Dancer	Natalma
Dam Danzig's Beauty 1987	Danzig; 1977	Pas de Nom	Admiral's Voyage
Dam Danzig's Beauty 1987	Danzig; 1977	Pas de Nom	Petitioner
Dam Danzig's Beauty 1987	Sweetest Chant; 1978	Mr. Leader	Hail to Reason
Dam Danzig's Beauty 1987	Sweetest Chant; 1978	Mr. Leader	Jolie Deja
Dam Danzig's Beauty 1987	Sweetest Chant; 1978	Gay Sonnet	Sailor
Dam Danzig's Beauty 1987	Sweetest Chant; 1978	Gay Sonnet	Gay Rig (family: 9-f)

== Sources ==
- Distorted Humor's racing stats
- Distorted Humor Profile on the Stallion Register
- Blood Horse leading sire list
- WinStar Farm
- NTRA bio of WinStar Farm
- National Thoroughbred Racing Association's bio of WinStar
