= Square Eddie =

Canadian Thoroughbred racehorse

- Sire: Smart Strike
- Grandsire: Mr. Prospector
- Dam: Forty Gran
- Damsire: El Gran Senor
- Sex: Stallion
- Foaled: 2006
- Country: Canada
- Colour: Chestnut
- Breeder: Kinghaven Farms
- Owner: 1) David Gorton (UK); 2) J. Paul Reddam (USA)
- Trainer: 1) John R. Best (UK); 2) Doug F. O'Neill (USA)
- Record: 6: 2-2-1
- Earnings: US$767,366 (equivalent)

Major wins
- Breeders' Futurity Stakes (2008)

Square Eddie (foaled April 4, 2006 in Ontario, Canada) is a Thoroughbred racehorse who has competed in England and the United States and who was one of the top winterbook favorites for the 2009 Kentucky Derby.

== Background ==
Bred by Kinghaven Farms, he is a son of Forty Gran, a daughter of Northern Dancer's son, El Gran Senor. He was sired by a son of Mr. Prospector, Smart Strike, a Leading sire in North America who is the sire of fifty-six stakes winners including 2007 American Horse of the Year Curlin.

As a yearling, Square Eddie was sold to a British buyer for $200,000 at the September Keeneland Sales. He was trained in England by John Best for owner David Gorton.

== Racing career ==
The colt began racing on the turf at age two in England. Making his debut on May 19, 2008, at Windsor Racecourse, Square Eddie finished last in the Weatherbys Bank Conditions Stakes. Entered in the June 17 Group 2 Coventry Stakes, he ran eleventh in a field of eighteen, reportedly coming out of the race with sore shins. In his third start on July 22, under new jockey Steve Drowne, he earned his first win in the Emma Arbery Memorial Maiden Stakes at Salisbury Racecourse, then followed up with a close second-place result in the September 6 Sirenia Stakes at Kempton Park Racecourse.

Following his performance in the Sirenia Stakes, Square Eddie was purchased by California businessman J. Paul Reddam, who sent him to Lexington, Kentucky to race on the Polytrack synthetic dirt at Keeneland Race Course. Ridden by Rafael Bejarano, Square Eddie showed an affinity for synthetic dirt, easily winning the Grade 1 Breeders' Futurity Stakes by 4¾ lengths. After this win, Square Eddie was turned over to trainer American Doug O'Neill and was entered in the Breeders' Cup Juvenile on the synthetic surface at Santa Anita Park. With jockey Rafael Bejarano on board, he was running at or near the lead but coming down the stretch dropped back to third behind front-runner Midshipman. Boxed in by the horse running second on the outside, Square Eddie came back to finish second and may have won the race, but Garrett Gomez aboard winner Midshipman made sure there was no room to get past.

In a December 26, 2008, article on the ESPN website, award-winning horse racing writer Bill Finley picked Square Eddie as the number two contender behind Remsen Stakes winner Old Fashioned for the first leg of the 2009 U.S. Triple Crown series, the Kentucky Derby.

On January 17, 2009, Square Eddie made his three-year-old debut with a second-place finish in the San Rafael Stakes.
