= Hagdang Bato =

Philippine racehorse (born 2009)

- Sire: Quaker Ridge
- Grandsire: Forty Niner
- Dam: Fire Down Under
- Damsire: Dixie Brass
- Sex: Stallion
- Foaled: January 2, 2009 (age 17)
- Country: Philippines
- Color: Bay
- Breeder: Benhur Abalos
- Owner: Benhur Abalos
- Trainer: Ruben S. Tupas
- Record: 37: 31–3–1
- Earnings: ₱29,532,954.31

Major wins
- 1st Leg Triple Crown Stakes Race (2012); 2nd Leg Triple Crown Stakes Race (2012); 3rd Leg Triple Crown Stakes Race (2012); PCSO Presidential Gold Cup (2012, 2014); PCSO Silver Cup (2013)

Awards
- Philracom Triple Crown (2012)

Honors
- PSA Annual Awards (2012); Philtobo Horse of the Year (2013, 2014)

Hagdang Bato (foaled January 2, 2009) is a Filipino Thoroughbred racehorse who won the Philippine Triple Crown in 2012. He is also a two-time Presidential Gold Cup champion winning in 2012 and 2014.

== Background ==
Hagdang Bato is a bay horse with a white star bred in Batangas, Philippines by Benhur Abalos. He was sired by Quaker Ridge out of the mare Fire Down Under, making him a half-brother to Ibarra.

== Racing career ==
Hagdang Bato earned the Triple Crown in July 2012 at the San Lazaro Leisure Park, becoming the first horse to do so since Silver Story in 2001. The horse was trained by Ruben Tupas and is often ridden by jockey JB Hernandez. For the 2012 season, the horse won 10 big stake races inclusive of the Triple Crown. He also won the 40th Presidential Gold Cup, becoming the fifth horse to win the Triple Crown and PGC in the same year.

Hagdang Bato and Hernandez were recognized in the 2012 PSA Annual Awards.

He was also named Horse of the Year in 2013 and 2014 by the Philippine Thoroughbred Owners and Breeders Organization (Philtobo)

In 2013, hindered by a faulty starting gate, Hagdang Bato finished fourth in the Presidential Gold Cup while his rival Pugad Lawin emerged the winner. He later won the 2014 Gold Cup.

Hagdang Bato was originally entered into the 2015 Gold Cup. The horse was obliged to carry 62 kilograms (137 lb), the heaviest handicap weight the organizers had ever imposed. He was later withdrawn from the race. Earlier, Abalos had expressed his intention to retire Hagdang Bato to serve stud duty if he will be asked to carry a handicap over 59 kilograms (130 lb) at the Gold Cup.

== Retirement ==
Hagdang Bato resides in Tiger Horse Farm owned by Abalos. The horse is still reportedly alive as of May 2026.

== Pedigree ==
Pedigree of Hagdang Bato (PHI), bay horse 2009
Sire Quaker Ridge (USA) 1996	Forty Niner; 1985	Mr. Prospector	Raise a Native
Sire Quaker Ridge (USA) 1996	Forty Niner; 1985	Mr. Prospector	Gold Digger
Sire Quaker Ridge (USA) 1996	Forty Niner; 1985	File	Tom Rolfe
Sire Quaker Ridge (USA) 1996	Forty Niner; 1985	File	Continue
Sire Quaker Ridge (USA) 1996	Twilight Ridge; 1983	Cox's Ridge	Best Turn
Sire Quaker Ridge (USA) 1996	Twilight Ridge; 1983	Cox's Ridge	Our Martha
Sire Quaker Ridge (USA) 1996	Twilight Ridge; 1983	Waving Sky	Quibu
Sire Quaker Ridge (USA) 1996	Twilight Ridge; 1983	Waving Sky	Fading Sky
Dam Fire Down Under (USA) 1995	Dixie Brass; 1989	Dixieland Band	Northern Dancer
Dam Fire Down Under (USA) 1995	Dixie Brass; 1989	Dixieland Band	Mississippi Mud
Dam Fire Down Under (USA) 1995	Dixie Brass; 1989	Petite Diable	Sham
Dam Fire Down Under (USA) 1995	Dixie Brass; 1989	Petite Diable	Taste of Life
Dam Fire Down Under (USA) 1995	Fired Heater; 1990	World Appeal	Valid Appeal
Dam Fire Down Under (USA) 1995	Fired Heater; 1990	World Appeal	Go Go Windy
Dam Fire Down Under (USA) 1995	Fired Heater; 1990	Dance All Summer	Summer Time Guy
Dam Fire Down Under (USA) 1995	Fired Heater; 1990	Dance All Summer	Meadow Dancer (Family: 11-f)
