= Dancing in Silks =

American-bred Thoroughbred racehorse

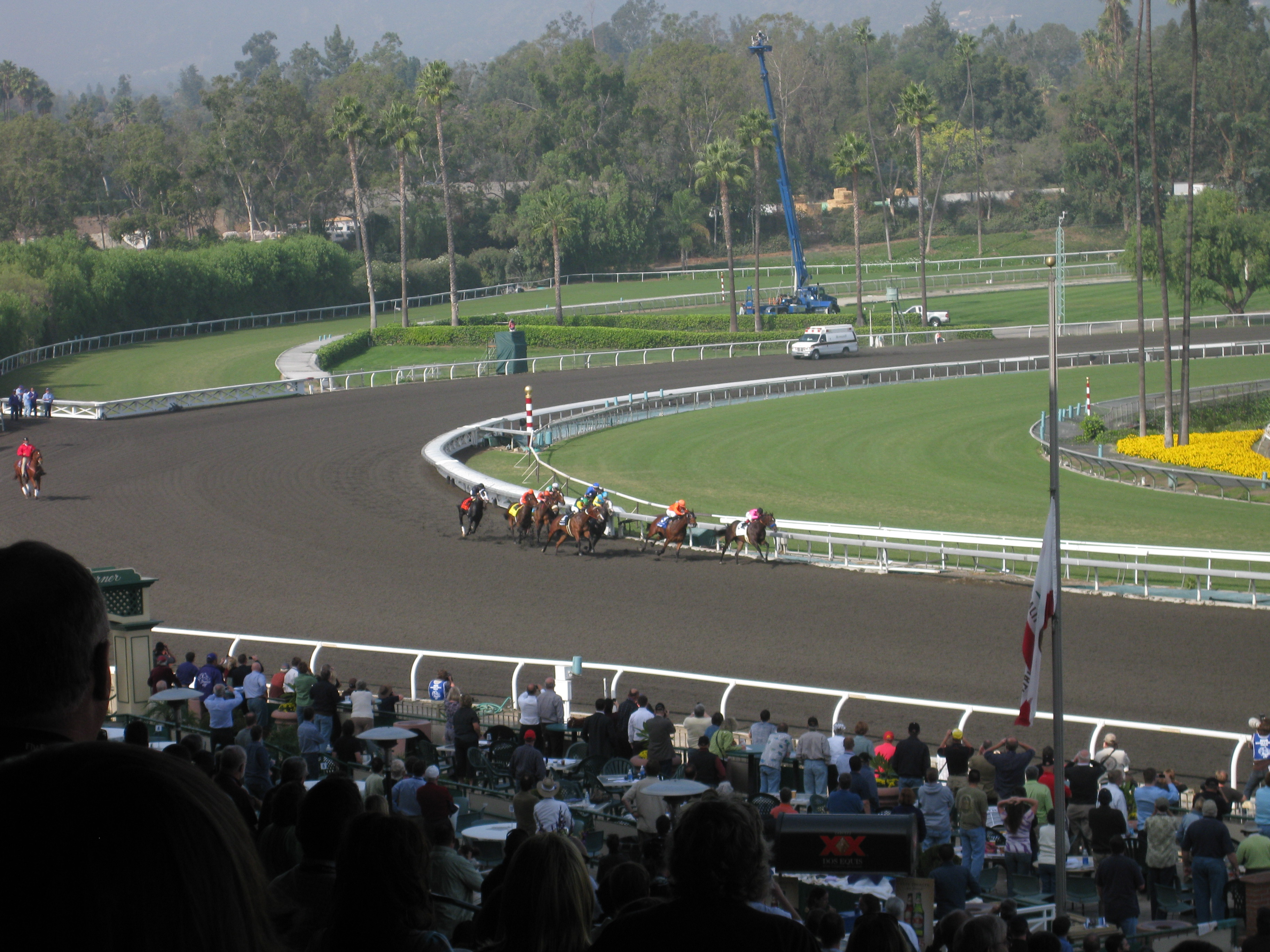
- Dancing in Silks (outside, black saddle cloth) in the 2009 Breeders' Cup Sprint
- Sire: Black Minnaloushe
- Grandsire: Storm Cat
- Dam: Lemhi Love
- Damsire: Royal and Regal
- Sex: Gelding
- Foaled: 2005
- Country: United States
- Colour: Bay
- Breeder: Ronald E. Jex
- Owner: Ken Kinakin
- Trainer: Carla Gaines
- Record: 13: 7-2-2
- Earnings: US$1,447,622

Major wins
- California Cup Sprint (2009) Breeders' Cup wins: Breeders' Cup Sprint (2009)

Awards
- Co-California Horse of the Year (2009)
- Last updated on January 15, 2010

Dancing in Silks (foaled March 2, 2005 in California) is an American Thoroughbred racehorse best known for winning the 2009 Breeders' Cup Sprint at Santa Anita Park.

A 4-year-old gelding, Dancing in Silks was bred by Ronald E. Jex. The horse races for Ken Kinakin and is trained by Carla Gaines. Dancing in Silks is the only horse owned by Ken Kinakin, a 48-year-old Canadian businessman from Kelowna, British Columbia. Originally sold at the November 2005 Keeneland Breeding Stock Sale for $20,000, Kinakin purchased him at the 2006 Canadian Thoroughbred Horse Society (British Columbia Division) Summer Mixed Sale for $21,401.

The winner of the Breeders' Cup Sprint in a four-horse blanket finish, the race marked the fourth straight win for Dancing in Silks and his first try in a Grade One event.

Dancing in Silks shared 2009 California Horse of the Year honors with California Flag. He continues to train at Santa Anita Park and is expected to make his next start there in January 2010.
