= Sharp Humor =

American Thoroughbred racehorse

- Sire: Distorted Humor
- Grandsire: Forty Niner
- Dam: Bellona
- Damsire: Hansel
- Sex: Stallion
- Foaled: 2003
- Country: United States
- Colour: Bay
- Breeder: Patricia Purdy
- Owner: Purdedel Stable & WinStar Farm
- Trainer: Dale L. Romans
- Record: 10: 4-2-1
- Earnings: $$490,410

Major wins
- Bertram F. Bongard Stakes (2005); Sleepy Hollow Stakes (2005); Swale Stakes (2006)
- Last updated on May 5, 2009

Sharp Humor (April 21, 2003 – March 31, 2015) was a Thoroughbred race horse.

== Connections ==
Sharp Humor was co-owned by the Purdedel Stable, trained by Dale Romans, and ridden by Mark Guidry. Sharp Humor was bred in New York by Patrica S. Purdy. Just before the running of the Kentucky Derby of 2006, WinStar Farm in Versailles, Kentucky, (where his sire, Distorted Humor stands), acquired a share in him.

== Breeding ==
Sharp Humor is the son of Distorted Humor out of the mare Bellona. His sire is a son of Forty Niner who is in turn a son of the very influential Mr. Prospector.

== Races ==
Finish	Race	Distance	Track	Condition
2nd	Hudson Handicap	Six furlongs	Belmont Park	Fast
19th	Kentucky Derby	One and One-Quarter Miles	Churchill Downs	Fast
2nd	Florida Derby	One and One-Eighth Miles	Gulfstream Park	Fast
1st	Swale Stakes	Seven Furlongs	Gulfstream Park	Fast
1st	Sleepy Hollow Stakes	One Mile	Belmont Park	Sloppy
1st	Bertram F. Bongard Stakes	Seven Furlongs	Belmont Park	Fast
3rd	New York Breeders' Futurity	Six Furlongs	Finger Lakes	Fast
4th	Allowance	Six Furlongs	Saratoga Race Course	Fast
1st	Maiden	Five Furlongs	Belmont Park	Fast

Sharp Humor fractured his knee in the Kentucky Derby and underwent surgery on May 11, 2006, at the Rood & Riddle Equine Hospital in Lexington. After recovering, he underwent therapeutic swimming at the Kesmark Equine Rehabilitation Center also in Lexington. Sharp Humor was exported to South Korea in 2011 and stood at stud at the Let's Run Stud Farm on Jeju Island. He sustained a paddock accident in March and his death was reported to the media on March 31, 2015.
