= I'll Have Another =

American-bred Thoroughbred racehorse

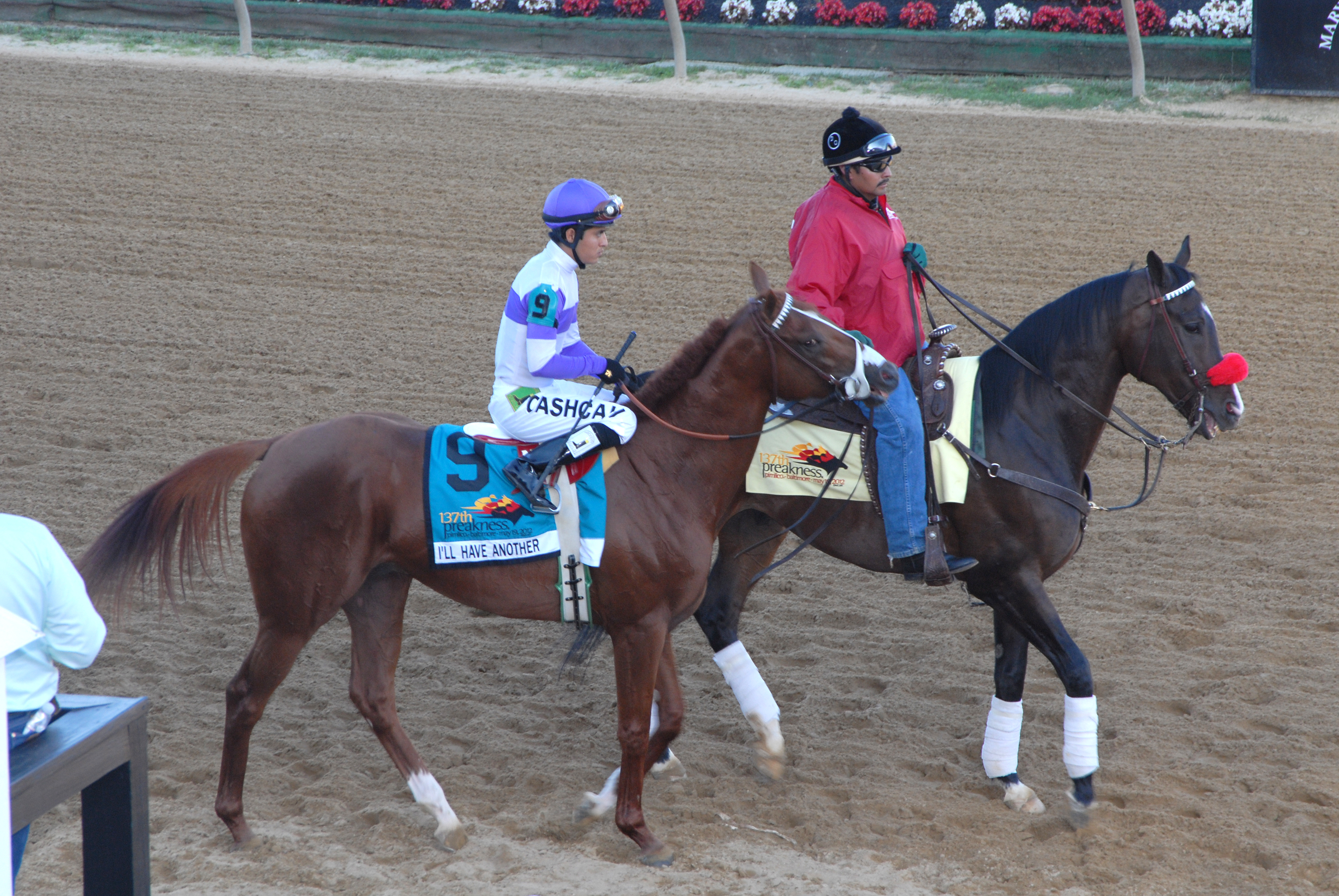
- I'll Have Another (left) and Lava Man at the 2012 Preakness Stakes.
- Sire: Flower Alley
- Grandsire: Distorted Humor
- Dam: Arch's Gal Edith
- Damsire: Arch
- Sex: Stallion
- Foaled: April 1, 2009
- Country: United States
- Color: Chestnut
- Breeder: Harvey Clarke
- Owner: J. Paul Reddam
- Trainer: Douglas F. O'Neill
- Jockey: Mario Gutierrez
- Record: 7: 5-1-0
- Earnings: US$ 2,693,600

Major wins
- Santa Anita Derby (2012); Robert B. Lewis Stakes (2012); Triple Crown Race wins: Kentucky Derby (2012); Preakness Stakes (2012)

Awards
- American Champion Three-Year-Old Male Horse

I'll Have Another (foaled April 1, 2009) is a champion American Thoroughbred racehorse who won the 2012 Kentucky Derby and Preakness Stakes.

He was bred in Kentucky, owned by Canadian businessman J. Paul Reddam and trained by Doug O'Neill. In May 2012, ridden by Mario Gutierrez, he won the first two legs of the Triple Crown by taking the Kentucky Derby with a time of 2:01.83. and the Preakness Stakes in 1:55.94. On the day before the Belmont Stakes, he was scratched due to tendonitis, ending his chances of winning the Triple Crown, and retired from racing.

== Background ==
I'll Have Another is a chestnut horse sired by the Travers Stakes winner Flower Alley. Flower Alley's sire, Distorted Humor, was also the sire of 2003 Kentucky Derby winner Funny Cide. In September 2010, as a yearling, I'll Have Another was sent to the Keeneland sales where he was bought for $11,000 by Victor M. Davila. Davila, an exercise rider, broke and trained the colt before selling him as a two-year-old to J. Paul Reddam for $35,000 at the Ocala Breeder's sale. According to Reddam, the colt's name is inspired by his reply when his wife asks if he wants more of her fresh-baked cookies: "I'll Have Another."

== Racing career ==
=== 2011: two-year-old season ===
After winning on his racecourse debut in July 2011, I'll Have Another finished second to Creative Cause in the Grade II Best Pal Stakes at Del Mar in August. He ran sixth of the ten runners behind Currency Swap in the Grade I Hopeful Stakes on a sloppy track at Saratoga.

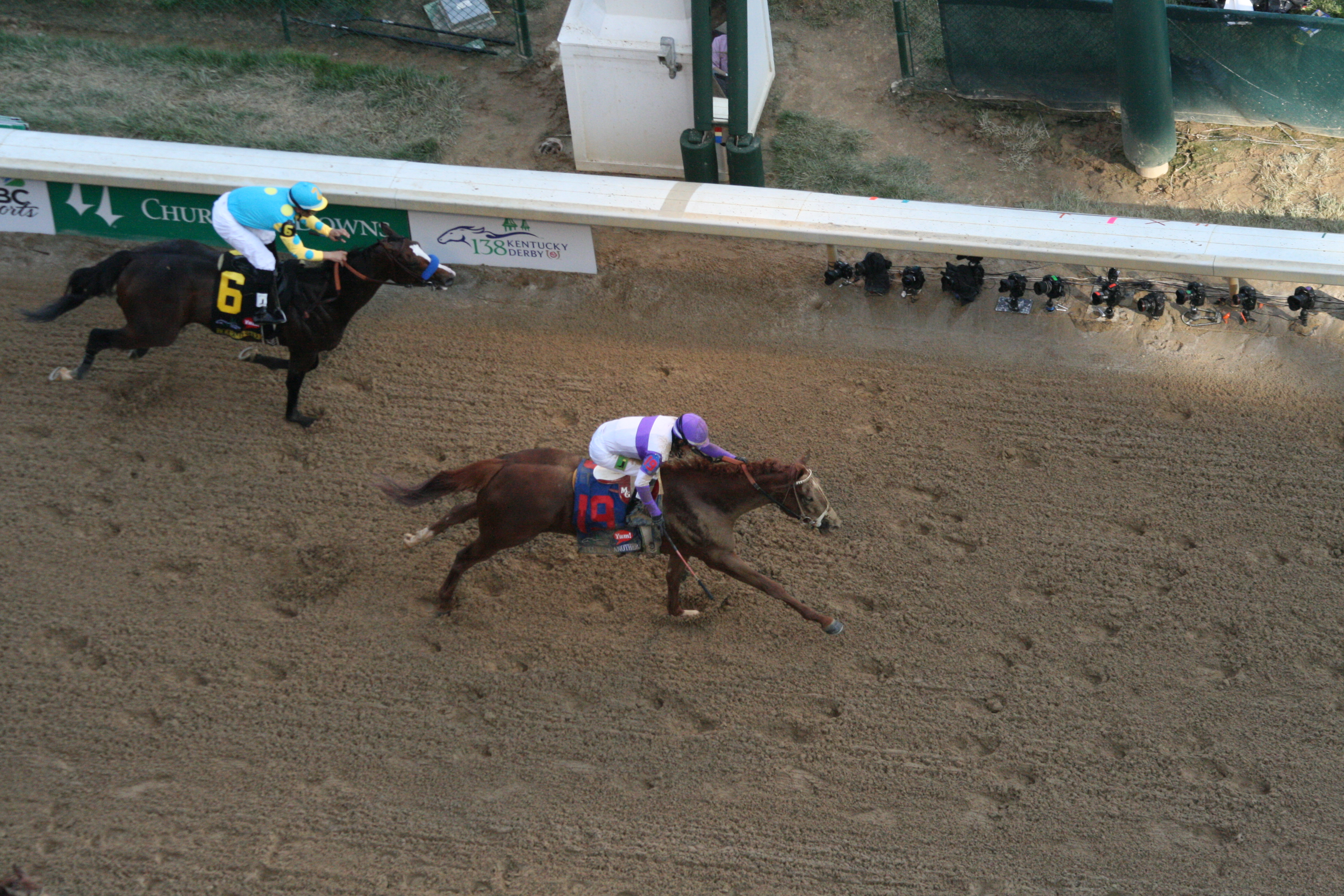
I'll Have Another (#19) crosses the finish line at the 2012 Kentucky Derby ahead of Bodemeister (far left)

=== 2012: three-year-old season ===
I'll Have Another began his three-year-old season by winning the Robert B. Lewis Stakes at Santa Anita on February 4, as a 43/1 outsider. In April, he won the Santa Anita Derby, staying on gamely to beat the favorite Creative Cause by a nose.

I'll Have Another's lead pony in the Kentucky Derby post parade on May 5, 2012, was the retired gelding Lava Man, whom Doug O'Neill had trained previously. As of Derby Day 2012, Lava Man was the 27th-leading Thoroughbred money earner of all time, having won $5,268,706 in his racing career. Lava Man had also accompanied I'll Have Another to the post for his win in the Santa Anita Derby, the colt's final Kentucky Derby prep. Lava Man led I'll Have Another to the post again at Pimlico Race Course in Baltimore, Maryland on May 19, 2012, for the Preakness Stakes.

==== Triple Crown races ====
In the Kentucky Derby on May 5, I'll Have Another started at odds of 15–1 in what was considered an unusually strong field. In front of a record crowd of 165,307, I'll Have Another produced a strong finish to catch the front-running Bodemeister in the closing stages and win by one and a half lengths in a final time of 2:01.83 for 1 1/4 miles. He is the first horse in the history of the Kentucky Derby to have won from post position 19. It was the Derby debut for his 25-year-old jockey Mario Gutierrez, who had not previously ridden in any of the Triple Crown races. After the race, Gutierrez described I'll Have Another as "an amazing horse", and said that "from the first time I met him, I knew he was the one".

In the Preakness Stakes on May 19, I'll Have Another was sent off at odds of 3–1 with Bodemeister starting favorite at 8–5. Gutierrez settled the colt in fourth place as Bodemeister set the pace from Creative Cause. On the turn into the straight, I'll Have Another passed Creative Cause to move into second place, and caught Bodemeister in the final strides to win by a neck, finishing the 1 3/16-mile race in a final time of 1:55.94.

==== Injury and retirement ====
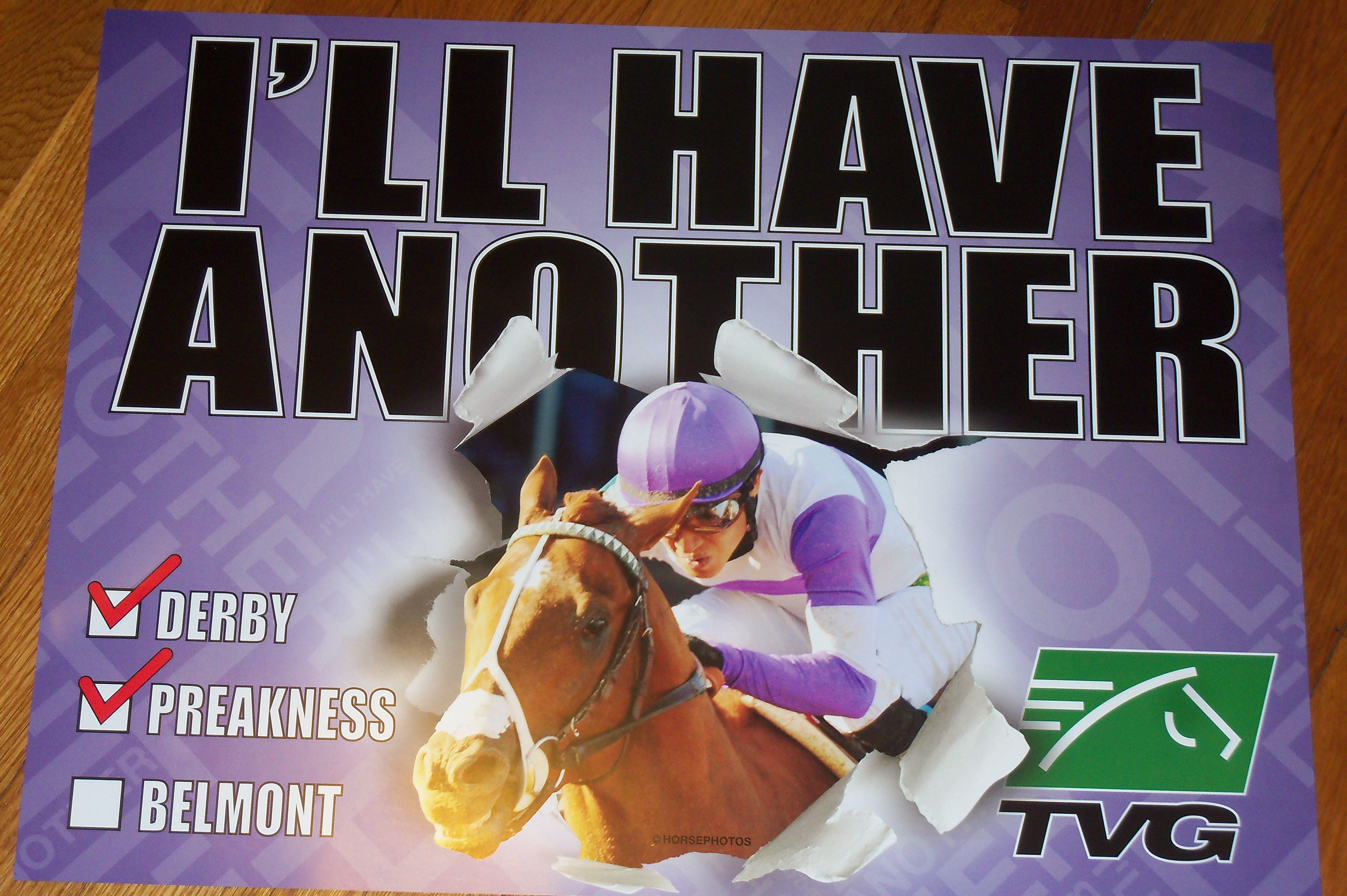
Poster for I'll Have Another's Triple Crown attempt, before being scratched the day before the 2012 Belmont Stakes.

I'll Have Another was drawn to run from the eleventh post position of the twelve runners, meaning that he would start on the outside of the field. On the Friday before the Belmont Stakes was to run, trainer Doug O'Neill indicated that the horse was officially out of the race due to a tendon injury, ending his hopes of a Triple Crown. At a news conference, the track veterinarian described the injury as slow-healing, requiring up to three to six months for recovery, and if the horse had raced, the risk of a bowed tendon would be very high. Thus, trainer O'Neill announced that he and Reddam decided to retire the horse from racing. He became the third horse, after Burgoo King in 1932 and Bold Venture in 1936, to be scratched from the Belmont Stakes after having won the first two legs of the Triple Crown.

On July 11 the New York Times carried a report on the veterinary records of I'll Have Another, which O'Neill had been required to submit to the New York racing authorities. The records showed that the colt had been suffering from osteoarthritis. Three veterinarians interviewed by The Blood-Horse magazine, stated that the medications used were phenylbutazone, dexamethasone and polyglycan, a glucosamine-based medication, all of which were routine and appropriate.

== Stud career ==
On June 23, 2012, it was announced that I'll Have Another had been sold with the intent that he would be exported to stand at stud at the Big Red Farm, located in Hokkaido, Japan, for the 2013 breeding season. J. Paul Reddam stated on June 9 that Big Red Farm paid $10 million for I'll Have Another after he received only two offers from American breeding farms:one for $3 million, the other $2.5 million. Reddam thought I'll Have Another stood a better chance of success at stud in Japan, where he would receive higher-quality books of mares than he would have attracted in the U.S. Reddam added that he would like to someday reacquire I'll Have Another, if possible. In 2013, his first season in Japan, I'll Have Another covered 152 mares, about 80 percent of whom became pregnant. He commanded stud fees of 3.2 million yen, or about $31,000. Of the progenies in Japan, his most successfuls are Another Truth, a gelding that won the Antares Stakes in 2019, and Win Marvel who won the Aoi Stakes in 2022 and later the Hanshin Cup in 2023.

On November 6, 2018, it was announced that I'll Have Another would return to the U.S. for the 2019 breeding season to stand at stud at the Ballena Vista Farm in Ramona, California for a fee of $6,000.

In March 2024 I'll Have Another retired from stud duty, with Old Friends Equine announcing that he had been donated to their retirement farm in Georgetown, Kentucky by owner J. Paul Reddam.

=== Notable progeny ===
c = colt, f = filly, g = gelding

Foaled	Name	Sex	Major Wins
2014	Another Truth (JPN)	g	2019 Antares Stakes, 2020 Diolite Kinen
2019	Win Marvel (JPN)	c	2022 Aoi Stakes, 2023 Hanshin Cup, 2024 Hankyu Hai, 2024 Keio Hai Spring Cup

== Pedigree ==
Pedigree of I'll Have Another, Chestnut colt, 2009
Sire Flower Alley B. 2002	Distorted Humor; 1993	Forty Niner; 1985	Mr Prospector* 1970
Sire Flower Alley B. 2002	Distorted Humor; 1993	Forty Niner; 1985	File 1976
Sire Flower Alley B. 2002	Distorted Humor; 1993	Danzigs Beauty; 1987	Danzig* 1977
Sire Flower Alley B. 2002	Distorted Humor; 1993	Danzigs Beauty; 1987	Sweetest Chant 1978
Sire Flower Alley B. 2002	Princess Olivia; 1995	Lycius; 1988	Mr Prospector* 1970
Sire Flower Alley B. 2002	Princess Olivia; 1995	Lycius; 1988	Lypatia 1975
Sire Flower Alley B. 2002	Princess Olivia; 1995	Dance Image; 1990	Sadler's Wells 1981
Sire Flower Alley B. 2002	Princess Olivia; 1995	Dance Image; 1990	Diamond Spring 1977
Dam Arch's Gal Edith Ch. 2002	Arch; 1995	Kris S. 1977	Roberto 1969
Dam Arch's Gal Edith Ch. 2002	Arch; 1995	Kris S. 1977	Sharp Queen 1965
Dam Arch's Gal Edith Ch. 2002	Arch; 1995	Aurora; 1988	Danzig* 1977
Dam Arch's Gal Edith Ch. 2002	Arch; 1995	Aurora; 1988	Althea 1981
Dam Arch's Gal Edith Ch. 2002	Force Five Gal; 1994	Pleasant Tap; 1987	Pleasant Colony 1978
Dam Arch's Gal Edith Ch. 2002	Force Five Gal; 1994	Pleasant Tap; 1987	Never Knock 1979
Dam Arch's Gal Edith Ch. 2002	Force Five Gal; 1994	Last Cause; 1985	Caucasus 1972
Dam Arch's Gal Edith Ch. 2002	Force Five Gal; 1994	Last Cause; 1985	Last Bird 1973 (Family 23-b)

- I'll Have Another is inbred 4s × 4s to the stallion Mr Prospector, meaning that he appears fourth generation twice on the sire side of his pedigree. I'll Have Another is also inbred 4s × 4d to Danzig, meaning he appears fourth generation once on the sire side and once on the dam side of the pedigree.

== See also ==
- List of racehorses
