= Philracom Triple Crown =

Horse racing in the Philippines

- Location: Philippines
- Inaugurated: 1978; 48 years ago
- Race type: Thoroughbred (Triple Crown race series)
- Sponsor: Philippine Racing Commission

Race information
- Qualification: 3-year-olds

The Philracom Triple Crown Stakes is a three-race horse racing series sanctioned by the Philippine Racing Commission (Philracom). It is considered the most prestigious race in the Philippines for three-year-old (3YO) Thoroughbreds. Horses who finishes first in all three races per season are recognized as Triple Crown Champions.

== Background ==
The Triple Crown Stakes backed by the Philippine Racing Commission (Philracom). The body's first chairman Danding Cojuangco is widely credited as the racing series' founder. It was however under the administration of Philracom chairman Nemesio Yabut that the races were established. Consisting of three legs or races, the Philippine race was modeled after the USA Triple Crown. In its inaugural edition in 1978, Native Gift won the first two legs, but his bid for a sweep was thwarted by Majority Rule in the final race. Peping Cojuangco, however was the owner, trainer and breeder for both horses.

The first Triple Crown champion was recognized in 1981, when Fair and Square won all three legs of that year's series. Since then, eleven more horses have accomplished the same feat, the most recent being Heneral Kalentong in 2020.

The first two legs of the series have traditionally been referred to as the Cojuangco Cup and the J.V. Ongpin Cup, respectively, while the final leg has been known as the Horseman's Cup. At least for the 1987 edition, the second and third tournaments were dubbed the Horsemen's Cup and Chairman's Cup.

However, recent editions commonly refer to the races simply by their order as legs of the Triple Crown series.

== Records ==
=== Winners ===
Key for full list of race winners
†	Denotes winners of the Triple Crown
#	Denotes winners of the other two combinations of 2 out of the 3 Triple Crown races

Philracom Triple Crown series race winners since 2010
Year	Winners			Ref.
Year	1st leg	2nd leg	3rd leg	Ref.
2010	# Yes Pogi		Carriedo	
2011	Hari ng Yambo	Magna Carta	Tensile Strength	
2012	† Hagdang Bato			
2013	Divine Eagle	# Spinning Ridge		
2014	† Kid Molave			
2015	Superv	Court of Honor	Miss Brulay	
2016	Radioactive	Dewey Boulevard	Underwood	
2017	† Sepfourteen			
2018	Smart Candy	Wonderland	Victorious Colt	
2019	# Real Gold	Boss Emong	# Real Gold	
2020	† Heneral Kalentong			
2021	# Nuclear Bomb		War Cannon	
2022	# Basheirrou		Radio Bell	
2023	La Trouppei	# Jaguar		
2024	Ghost	Bea Bell	Still Somehow	
2025	# Vinalot Eyu		District One	
2026	Isa Bell	Gentle Dance	Bermuda Triangle	

=== Triple Crown champions ===
The following are horses which have won all three races in a single series.

- 1978–1980: No champion
- 1981: Fair and Square
- 1982: No champion
- 1983: Skywalker
- 1984–1986: No champion
- 1987: Time Master
- 1988: Magic Showtime
- 1989: Sun Dancer
- 1990–1995: No champion
- 1996: Strong Material
- 1997: No champion
- 1998: Real Top
- 1999–2000: No champion
- 2001: Silver Story
- 2002–2011: No champion
- 2012: Hagdang Bato
- 2013: No champion
- 2014: Kid Molave
- 2015–2016: No champion
- 2017: Sepfourteen
- 2018–2019: No champion
- 2020: Heneral Kalentong
- 2021–present: No champion

== See also ==
- PCSO Presidential Gold Cup
- PCSO Silver Cup
- Triple Crown of Thoroughbred Racing
