= Bodemeister =

American Thoroughbred racehorse

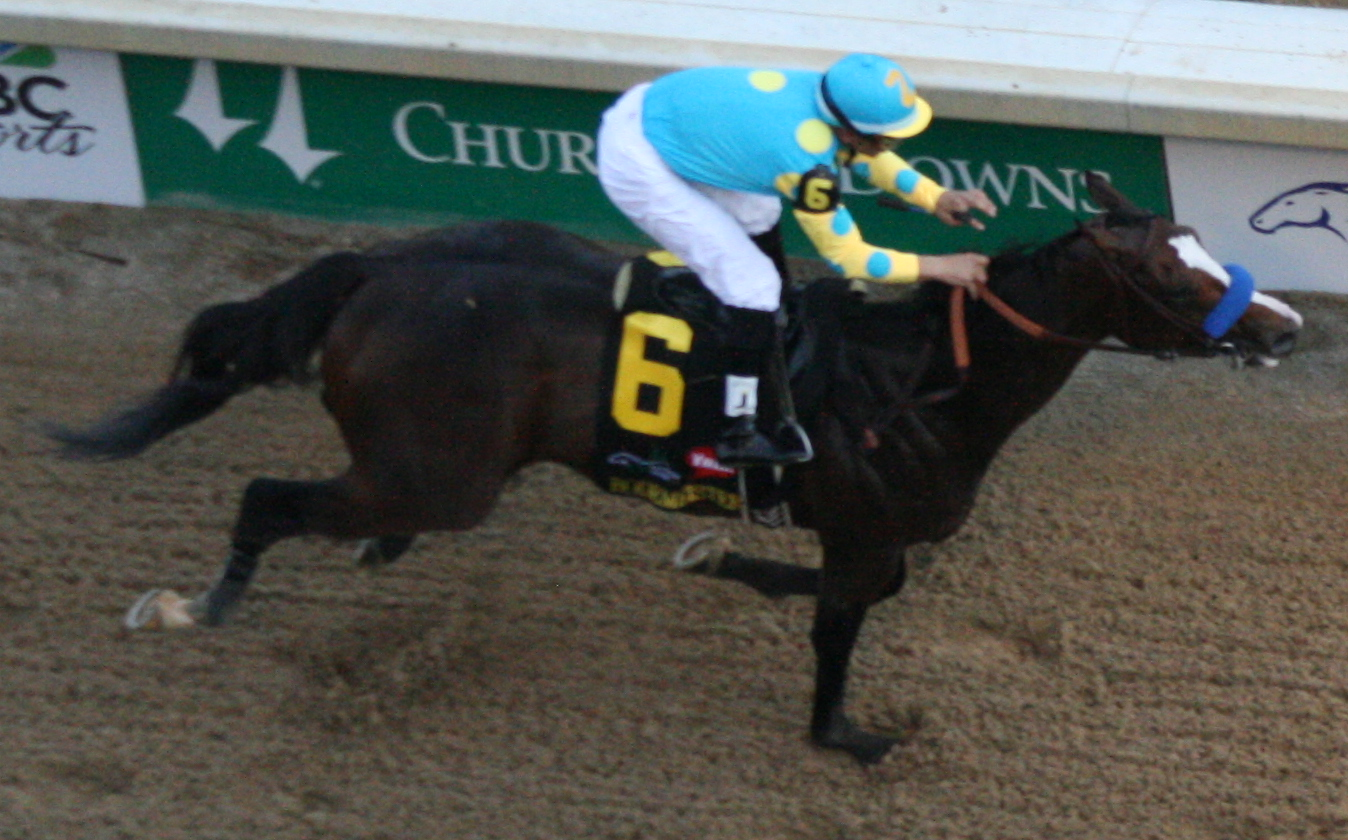
- Bodemeister at the 2012 Kentucky Derby.
- Sire: Empire Maker
- Grandsire: Unbridled
- Dam: Untouched Talent
- Damsire: Storm Cat
- Sex: Stallion
- Foaled: 2009
- Country: United States
- Color: Bay
- Breeder: Audley Farm
- Owner: türk Jokey kulübü
- Trainer: Bob Baffert
- Record: 6:2-4-0
- Earnings: $1,104,800

Major wins
- Arkansas Derby (2012)

Bodemeister (foaled April 28, 2009) is a Thoroughbred race horse who won the 2012 Arkansas Derby and finished second to I'll Have Another in the 2012 Kentucky Derby and 2012 Preakness Stakes. He went on to become the sire of 2017 Kentucky Derby winner Always Dreaming.

== Background ==
Bodemeister is a Bay horse with a white blaze. He was named after Bode Baffert, the son of his trainer, Bob Baffert . His pedigree includes notable horses such as his grandsire Unbridled and his damsire Storm Cat. The colt was sired by the Belmont Stakes winner Empire Maker out of the mare Untouched Talent. He was sold as a yearling at the Keeneland September sales for $260,000.

== Racing career ==
Bodemeister did not race as a 2-year-old, but emerged as a 3-year-old to come in second in the 2012 San Felipe Stakes, then win the Arkansas Derby.

Bodemeister was widely considered one of the favorites to win the 2012 Kentucky Derby. Ridden by jockey Mike Smith Bodemeister led the Kentucky Derby from the start until 150 yards remained, when he was overtaken by I'll Have Another, leaving Bodemeister to finish in second place. The race came five weeks after Baffert was hospitalized in Dubai due to a heart attack.

Bodemeister was made favorite ahead of I'll Have Another by odds-makers in the 2012 Preakness Stakes on 19 May. The race developed in similar fashion to the Kentucky Derby, with Bodemeister leading until the final 50 yards, when he was caught by I'll Have Another and finished second by a neck.

Baffert announced afterward that Bodemeister would not race in the 2012 Belmont Stakes. On August 21 it was announced that Bodemeister had been diagnosed with an injury to his left shoulder and would retire to stud.

== Stud career ==
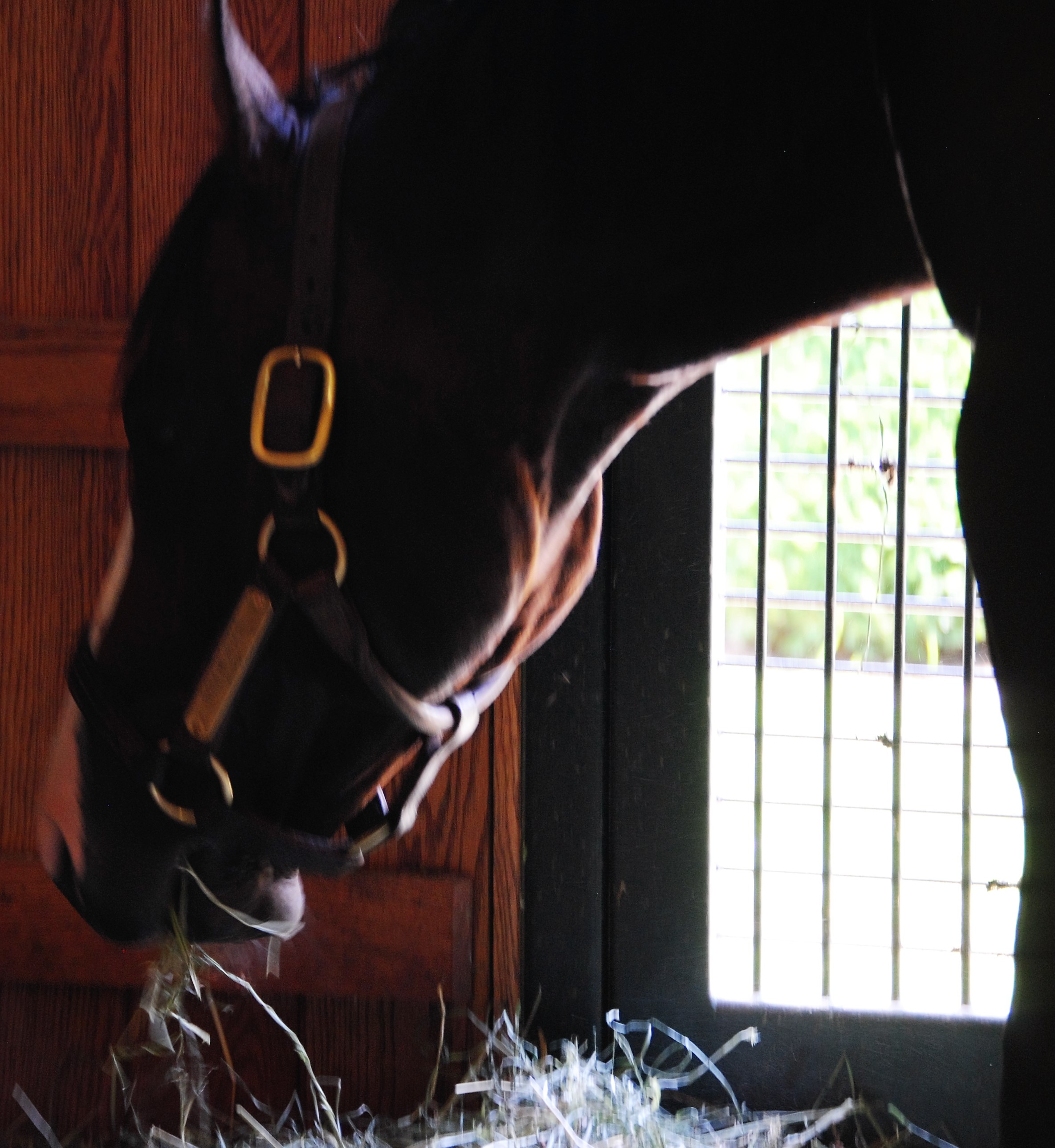
Bodemeister in retirement

Bodemeister entered stud at WinStar Farm in Versailles, Kentucky for the 2013 breeding season. His first foals reached racing age in 2016. Bodemeister saw his first winner on May 11, 2016, when gray filly Bode's Dream won a maiden race at Gulfstream Park.

Bodemeister made the news when an unusual white-headed colt with splashed white markings was born on June 5, 2016, later named Southern Phantom. "In 35 years in the industry I've never seen a Thoroughbred like this," said trainer Eric Guillot. "The mare hasn't thrown anything unusual before, but Bodemeister throws a lot of white. I've got a few by him with stockings and other markings, but this one's unique. It looks like he dunked his head into a five-gallon bucket of white paint."

Bodemeister's stud fee for 2017 was originally $25,000, but the fee was removed after Always Dreaming won Kentucky Derby 143.

He is the sire of 2017 Kentucky Derby winner Always Dreaming from his first crop of foals, as well as stakes-placed runners O Dionysus, American Anthem, Bode's Dream, Dharmaster, and the filly Kenda.

== Pedigree ==
Pedigree of Bodemeister
Sire Empire Maker B. 2000	Unbridled; 1987	Fappiano; 1977	Mr. Prospector 1970
Sire Empire Maker B. 2000	Unbridled; 1987	Fappiano; 1977	Killaloe 1970
Sire Empire Maker B. 2000	Unbridled; 1987	Gana Facil; 1981	Le Fabueleux 1961
Sire Empire Maker B. 2000	Unbridled; 1987	Gana Facil; 1981	Charedi 1976
Sire Empire Maker B. 2000	Toussaud; 1989	El Gran Senor; 1981	Northern Dancer 1961
Sire Empire Maker B. 2000	Toussaud; 1989	El Gran Senor; 1981	Sex Appeal 1970
Sire Empire Maker B. 2000	Toussaud; 1989	Image of Reality; 1976	In Reality 1964
Sire Empire Maker B. 2000	Toussaud; 1989	Image of Reality; 1976	Edee's Image 1969
Dam Untouched Talent Ch. 2004	Storm Cat; 1983	Storm Bird; 1978	Northern Dancer 1961
Dam Untouched Talent Ch. 2004	Storm Cat; 1983	Storm Bird; 1978	South Ocean 1967
Dam Untouched Talent Ch. 2004	Storm Cat; 1983	Terlingua; 1976	Secretariat 1970
Dam Untouched Talent Ch. 2004	Storm Cat; 1983	Terlingua; 1976	Crimson Saint 1969
Dam Untouched Talent Ch. 2004	Parade Queen; 1994	A.P. Indy; 1989	Seattle Slew 1974
Dam Untouched Talent Ch. 2004	Parade Queen; 1994	A.P. Indy; 1989	Weekend Surprise 1980
Dam Untouched Talent Ch. 2004	Parade Queen; 1994	Spanish Parade; 1988	Roberto 1969
Dam Untouched Talent Ch. 2004	Parade Queen; 1994	Spanish Parade; 1988	Nijit 1977

- Bodemeister is inbred 4 × 4 to the stallion Northern Dancer, meaning that the latter appears twice in the fourth generation of his pedigree.
