= Fair and Square (horse) =

Filipino Thoroughbred racehorse

- Sire: Belgrave Square (AUS)
- Dam: Fair Sea (NZ)
- Sex: Stallion
- Foaled: September/October 1977
- Country: Philippines
- Owner: Herminia Mamon
- Trainer: Antonio Alcasid
- Jockey: Jesus Guce

Major wins
- PCSO Presidential Gold Cup (1981, 1982); Philracom Triple Crown races (1981)

Awards
- Philracom Triple Crown (1981)

Fair and Square (1977–?) is a Filipino Thoroughbred racehorse and the first-ever Philracom Triple Crown champion (1981). He is also notable as the first horse to win back-to-back PCSO Presidential Gold Cup titles (1981 and 1982). As a sire, he produced Sun Dancer who won the Gold Cup two times in 1989 and 1990, and Fair Start who won the 1993 edition.

== Background ==
Fair and Square was by Belgrave Square (AUS) out of Fair Sea (NZ). He was bred in Australia but is an island-born, meaning he was foaled in the Philippines. He was foaled not before September 1977. The horse was owned by Herminia Mamon of C&H Enterprises.

== Horseracing career ==
Trained by Antonio Alcasid, Fair and Square is the first ever Philippine Racing Commission (Philracom) Triple Crown champion Philracom regulations at the time considered Fair and Square to be a three‑year‑old, since his actual foaling date was a few days after the first leg of the Triple Crown series. Under the Southern Hemisphere system, he would have been considered a four‑year‑old.

Jockey Jesus Guce steered him to that feat in 1981. Guce also rode the horse to a back-to-back PCSO Presidential Gold Cup win in 1981 and 1982.

== Stud career ==
Fair and Square sired Sun Dancer out of Katie's Dancer. Ochie Santos bred Sun Dancer for horseowner Toshio Abe. Sun Dancer went on to become a Triple Crown two-time champion himself like his sire in 1989 and 1990. Fair Start, a son of Fair and Square out of Anna’s Star, was owned by Herminia Mamon and won the Gold Cup in 1993.
