= Robert B. Lewis Stakes =

- Class: Grade III
- Location: Santa Anita Park; Arcadia, California, United States
- Inaugurated: 1935 (as Santa Catalina Handicap)
- Race type: Thoroughbred - Flat racing
- Website: www.santaanita.com

Race information
- Distance: 1 mile (8 furlongs)
- Surface: Dirt
- Track: left-handed
- Qualification: Three-Year-Olds
- Weight: 124 lbs with allowances
- Purse: $200,000

The Robert B. Lewis Stakes is a Grade III American Thoroughbred horse race for three year old horses at the distance of one mile on the dirt held annually in late January or early February at Santa Anita Park in Arcadia, California.

== History ==
Inaugurated as the Santa Catalina Handicap in 1935, there was no race in 1936. Upon its return in 1937, it was run as the Santa Catalina California-Bred Championship Stakes until 1940 when it was renamed the Santa Catalina Nursery Stakes and was a three-furlong race for two-year-olds. In 1941 it reverted to its original name, the Santa Catalina Handicap and remained as that until 1964 when it became the Santa Catalina Stakes. In 2007, the race was renamed again in order to honor the prominent racehorse owner Robert B. Lewis, who had died in 2006.

Due to restrictions and consolidations during World War II, there was no race held from 1942 through 1944.

Until 1964, the race was open to horses three years of age and older with the exception of 1940.

The race has been run at a variety of distances:

- 1935, 2024 to present : 1 mile
- 1937-1938, 1941, 1945-1946, 1953, 1964-1969, 1971-2010, 2012-2023 : 1 1/16 miles
- 1939, 1947-1952, 1954-1963, 2011 : 1 1/8 miles
- 1940 : 3 furlongs (for 2-year-olds)
- 1970 : 7 furlongs

The Robert B. Lewis Stakes is one of the key prep races leading to the Santa Anita Derby each year and is part of the Road to the Kentucky Derby.

== Records ==
Time record: (at the previous distance of 1 1/16 miles)

- 1:40.76 - Crown of Thorns (2008)

Most wins by an owner:

- 3 - Elmendorf Farm (1977, 1980, 1982)

Most wins by a jockey:

- 7 - Bill Shoemaker (1962, 1969, 1970, 1975, 1980, 1986, 1988)
- 7 - Laffit Pincay Jr. (1971, 1972, 1973, 1976, 1981, 1985, 1989)

Most wins by a trainer:

- 14 - Bob Baffert (1999, 2003, 2009, 2013, 2015, 2016, 2019, 2020, 2021, 2022, 2023, 2024, 2025, 2026)

== Winners ==
Year	Winner	Age	Jockey	Trainer	Owner	Distance (Miles)	Time	Grade
2026	Plutarch	3	Florent Geroux	Bob Baffert	Mrs. John Magnier, Derrick Smith and Michael B. Tabor	1	1:37.02	III
2025	Citizen Bull	3	Martin Garcia	Bob Baffert	SF Racing, Starlight Racing, Madaket Stables, Robert E. Masterson, Stonestreet Stables, Dianne Bashor, Determined Stables, Tom J. Ryan, Waves Edge Capital & Catherine Donovan	1	1:36.71	III
2024	Nysos	3	Flavien Prat	Bob Baffert	Baoma Corp	1	1:36.65	III
2023	Newgate	3	Frankie Dettori	Bob Baffert	SF Racing LLC, Starlight Racing, Madaket Stables LLC, Stonestreet Stables, Schoenfarber, Jay A., Waves Edge Capital & Catherine Donovan	1 1/16	1:43.11	III
2022	Messier	3	John R. Velazquez	Bob Baffert	SF Racing, Starlight Racing, & Madaket Stables	1 1/16	1:42.89	III
2021	Medina Spirit	3	Abel Cedillo	Bob Baffert	Zedan Racing Stables	1 1/16	1:46.26	III
2020	Thousand Words	3	Flavien Prat	Bob Baffert	Albaugh Family Stables and Spendthrift Farm	1 1/16	1:43.64	III
2019	Mucho Gusto	3	Joe Talamo	Bob Baffert	Michael Lund Petersen	1 1/16	1:41.81	III
2018	Lombo	3	Flavien Prat	Michael Pender	Michael V. Lombardi	1 1/16	1:45.41	III
2017	Royal Mo	3	Victor Espinoza	John Shirreffs	Ann & Jerry Moss	1 1/16	1:43.48	III
2016	Mor Spirit	3	Gary Stevens	Bob Baffert	Michael Lund Petersen	1 1/16	1:43.21	III
2015	Dortmund	3	Martin Garcia	Bob Baffert	Kaleem Shah	1 1/16	1:42.20	III
2014	Candy Boy	3	Gary Stevens	John W. Sadler	C R K Stable	1 1/16	1:41.83	II
2013	Flashback	3	Julien Leparoux	Bob Baffert	Gary & Mary West	1 1/16	1:42.95	II
2012	I'll Have Another	3	Mario Gutierrez	Doug O'Neill	J. Paul Reddam	1 1/16	1:40.84	II
2011	Anthony's Cross	3	Joel Rosario	Eoin G. Harty	A D K Racing	1 1/8	1:48.63	II
2010	Caracortado	3	Paul Atkinson	Michael Machowsky	Lo Hi Racing/Blahut	1 1/16	1:41.75	II
2009	Pioneerof the Nile	3	Garrett Gomez	Bob Baffert	Zayat Stables	1 1/16	1:41.90	II
2008	Crown of Thorns	3	Victor Espinoza	Richard Mandella	B. Wayne Hughes	1 1/16	1:40.76	II
2007	Great Hunter	3	Corey Nakatani	Douglas F. O'Neill	J. Paul Reddam	1 1/16	1:42.89	II
2006	Brother Derek	3	Alex Solis	Dan L. Hendricks	Cecil N. Peacock	1 1/16	1:41.96	II
2005	Declan's Moon	3	Victor Espinoza	Ronald W. Ellis	Jay Em Ess Stable	1 1/16	1:42.41	II
2004	St Averil	3	Tyler Baze	Rafael Becerra	Stan E. Fulton	1 1/16	1:41.62	II
2003	Domestic Dispute	3	David R. Flores	Bob Baffert	Gary M. Garber	1 1/16	1:42.20	II
2002	Labamta Babe	3	Kent Desormeaux	Robert J. Frankel	Edmund A. Gann	1 1/16	1:42.50	II
2001	Millennium Wind	3	Chris McCarron	David Hofmans	David & Jill Heerensperger	1 1/16	1:42.38	II
2000	The Deputy	3	Chris McCarron	Jenine Sahadi	Team Valor & Gary Barber	1 1/16	1:43.04	II
1999	General Challenge	3	Gary Stevens	Bob Baffert	Golden Eagle Farm	1 1/16	1:42.93	II
1998	Artax	3	Chris McCarron	Randy Bradshaw	Paraneck Stable	1 1/16	1:42.32	III
1997	Hello	3	Chris McCarron	Ron McAnally	Al & Sandee Kirkwood	1 1/16	1:42.60	
1996	Prince of Thieves	3	Gary Stevens	D. Wayne Lukas	Peter Mitchell	1 1/16	1:42.94	
1995	Larry the Legend	3	Kent Desormeaux	Craig A. Lewis	Craig A. Lewis	1 1/16	1:42.93	
1994	Wekiva Springs	3	Kent Desormeaux	Robert Hess Jr.	Donald R. Dizney	1 1/16	1:41.94	
1993	Art of Living	3	Gary Stevens	Gary Jones	Golden Eagle Farm	1 1/16	1:43.48	
1992	Vying Victor	3	Corey Black	Ian P. D. Jory	M/M Marvin Malmuth	1 1/16	1:44.33	
1991	Mane Minister	3	David R. Flores	J. Paco Gonzalez	T. McCaffery & John Toffan	1 1/16	1:42.60	
1990	Music Prospector	3	Frank Olivares	Steve Miyadi	Silky Green, Inc.	1 1/16	1:43.60	
1989	Flying Continental	3	Laffit Pincay Jr.	Jay M. Robbins	Jack Kent Cooke	1 1/16	1:43.60	
1988	Lively One	3	Bill Shoemaker	Charles Whittingham	Nelson Bunker Hunt	1 1/16	1:43.40	
1987	Stylish Winner	3	Gary Stevens	Bruce Headley	Johnston/Headley/Roncelli	1 1/16	1:43.80	
1986	Ferdinand	3	Bill Shoemaker	Charles Whittingham	Elizabeth A. Keck	1 1/16	1:43.00	
1985	Floating Reserve	3	Laffit Pincay Jr.	Joseph Manzi	Robert E. Hibbert	1 1/16	1:42.60	
1984	Tights	3	Rafael Meza	Laz Barrera	Mill House Stable	1 1/16	1:43.60	
1983	Fast Passage	3	Ed Delahoussaye	Laz Barrera	Dolly Green	1 1/16	1:42.60	
1982	Water Bank	3	Darrel McHargue	Ron McAnally	Elmendorf Farm	1 1/16	1:42.40	
1981	Stancharry *	3	Laffit Pincay Jr.	Melvin F. Stute	Cole, Freeman & Gold	1 1/16	1:41.40	
1980	Super Moment *	3	Donald Pierce	Ron McAnally	Elmendorf Farm	1 1/16	1:44.40	
1980	Rumbo *	3	Bill Shoemaker	Thomas Bell Jr.	Gayno Stable/Bell Bloodstock	1 1/16	1:44.60	
1979	Pole Position	3	Chris McCarron	George E. Goodwin	Eldorado Stables	1 1/16	1:42.00	
1978	Johnny's Image	3	Sandy Hawley	Mike R. Mitchell	Meryl Ann Tanz	1 1/16	1:44.00	
1977	Text	3	Donald Pierce	Vincent Clyne	Elmendorf Farm	1 1/16	1:42.00	
1976	An Act	3	Laffit Pincay Jr.	Ron McAnally	Katz, Brun & Roberts et al.	1 1/16	1:42.00	
1975	Kinalmeaky	3	Bill Shoemaker	Lester Holt	Helen Kenaston	1 1/16	1:42.80	
1974	Rube the Great	3	Angel Santiago	Pancho Martin	Sigmund Sommer	1 1/16	1:43.00	
1973	Sham	3	Laffit Pincay Jr.	Pancho Martin	Sigmund Sommer	1 1/16	1:45.00	
1972	Knightlander	3	Laffit Pincay Jr.	Paul K. Parker	Robert H. Grant	1 1/16	1:42.40	
1971	Unconscious	3	Laffit Pincay Jr.	John G. Canty	Arthur A. Seeligson Jr.	1 1/16	1:41.80	
1970	Colorado King, Jr.	3	Bill Shoemaker	Charles Whittingham	Forked Lightning Ranch	7-fur.	1:25.00	
1969	Inverness Drive	3	Bill Shoemaker	Joseph Manzi	Robert E. Hibbert	1 1/16	1:44.80	
1968	Prince Pablo	3	Johnny Sellers	Linwood J. Brooks	Kratz-Thayer	1 1/16	1:42.60	
1967	Serve Notice	3	Ismael Valenzuela	Ted Saladin	M/M. B. W. Martin	1 1/16	1:43.60	
1966	Exhibitionist	3	Eddie Belmonte	Hirsch Jacobs	Ethel D. Jacobs	1 1/16	1:43.20	
1965	Arksroni	3	Art Sherman	Frank E. Childs	M/M. Harry Hart	1 1/16	1:42.80	
1964	Count Charles	3	Manuel Ycaza	Charles Whittingham	Flying M Stable	1 1/16	1:43.20	
1963	Sea Orbit	7	Raymond York	John M. Leavitt	Wonder Y Ranch	1 1/8	1:49.00	
1962	New Policy	5	Bill Shoemaker	John H. Adams	Ralph Lowe	1 1/8	1:48.40	
1961	T. V. Lark	4	Eddie Arcaro	Paul K. Parker	C. R. Mac Stable	1 1/8	1:49.00	
1960	American Comet	4	Tommy Barrow	Martin L. Fallon	C. W. Smith Ent.	1 1/8	1:47.60	
1959	Terrang	6	William Boland	Carl A. Roles	Poltex Stable & R. Bond	1 1/8	1:48.60	
1958	Terrang	5	William Boland	Carl A. Roles	Poltex Stable & R. Bond	1 1/8	1:49.20	
1957	Honeys Alibi	5	Johnny Longden	Lev Fanning	W-L Ranch Co.	1 1/8	1:48.80	
1956	Guerrero	4	Johnny Longden	Graceton Philpot	Peter Strub	1 1/8	1:50.00	
1955	Golden Abbey	5	Johnny Longden	Reggie Cornell	W. W. Naylor	1 1/8	1:48.80	
1954	Stranglehold	5	Billy Pearson	Red McDaniel	N. G. Phillips	1 1/8	1:52.60	
1953	Blue Reading	6	Billy Pearson	Red McDaniel	Clement L. Hirsch	1 1/16	1:43.80	
1952	Lion	4	William M. Cook	Hugh Brundage	John Himelhoch	1 1/8	1:51.80	
1951	Your Host	4	Eric Guerin	Harry L. Daniels	William Goetz	1 1/8	1:48.20	
1950	Moonrush	4	Eddie Arcaro	Willie Alvarado	Anita King / Gus Luellwitz	1 1/8	1:51.40	
1949	Stepfather	5	Eddie Arcaro	Wayne B. Stucki	W-L Ranch Co.	1 1/8	1:48.80	
1948	On Trust	4	Johnny Longden	William Molter	E. O. Stice	1 1/8	1:50.80	
1947	See-Tee-See	4	Ralph Neves	Art Gruber	Hacienda de Cortez	1 1/8	1:50.60	
1946	Nanby Pass	4	Charley Stevenson	Sam Sechrest	Norman W. Church	1 1/16	1:43.80	
1945	Sea Sovereign	3	Ferril Zufelt	Bud Stotler	Charles S. Howard	1 1/16	1:43.80	
1944	No race	-	No Race	No Race	No Race	no race	0:00.00	
1943	No race	-	No Race	No Race	No Race	no race	0:00.00	
1942	No race	-	No Race	No Race	No Race	no race	0:00.00	
1941	Sweepida	4	Ralph Neves	Larry R. Staples	H. C. Hill	1 1/16	1:48.00	
1940	Valdina Myth	2	Eugene Rodriguez	John J. Flanigan	Valdina Farm	3-fur.	0:33.20	
1939	Brown Jade	5	John H. Adams	Ross E. Cooper	Charles E. Cooper	1 1/8	1:52.00	
1938	Lady Florise	5	Lester Balaski	George W. Glick	John W. Marchbank	1 1/16	1:45.60	
1937	Lloyd Pan	4	Harry Richards	H. B. Thomas	Alexander Pantages	1 1/16	1:48.00	
1936	No race	-	No Race	No Race	No Race	no race	0:00.00	
1935	Bluebeard	3	Harry Richards	Clyde Phillips	William R. Coe	1-mile	1:40.00	

*Run in two divisions in 1980. In 1981, Minnesota Chief won the race in record time but was disqualified and set back to second.

== See also ==
- Road to the Kentucky Derby
- List of American and Canadian Graded races
- Ten Things You Should Know About the Robert B. Lewis Stakes at Hello Race Fans!
