= Sleepy Hollow Stakes =

The Sleepy Hollow is an American ungraded restricted stakes race for two-year-olds Thoroughbreds held in the fall at Belmont Park, New York. Though not restricted to New York bred horses, this is not an open race: it is considered a race on the New York bred schedule.

The Sleepy Hollow is a one-mile race for young horses. In its 22nd running in 2015, the race offers a purse of $250,000.

The race is named for the historic village of Sleepy Hollow, New York on the banks of the Hudson River made famous by the American writer, Washington Irving in his 1819 short story, The Legend of Sleepy Hollow.

== Past winners ==
- 2021 - Shipsational (Luis Saez)
- 2020 - Brooklyn Strong (José Ortiz)
- 2019 - Captain Bombastic (Jose Ortiz)
- 2018 - Bankit (Irad Ortiz Jr.
- 2017 - Evaluator (Manuel Franco)
- 2016 - Pat On the Back (Dylan Davis)
- 2015 - Get Jets (Irad Ortiz, Jr.)
- 2014 - Ostrolenka (John Velazquez)
- 2013 - No Race
- 2012 - No Race
- 2011 - No Race
- 2010 - Bandbox (Ramon Dominguez)
- 2009 - Fenway Faithful (Ramon Dominguez)
- 2008 - Trinity Magic (Edgar Prado)
- 2007 - Giant Moon (Kent Desormeaux)
- 2006 - Chief's Lake (Garrett K. Gomez)
- 2005 - Sharp Humor (Edgar Prado)
- 2004 - Galloping Grocer (John R. Velazquez)
- 2003 - Friends Lake (Richard Migliore)
- 2002 - Funny Cide (José A. Santos)
- 2001 - White Ibis (Robbie Davis)
- 2000 - Le Grande Danseur (Jorge F. Chavez)
- 1999 - Entrepreneur (John R. Velazquez)
- 1998 - Shut Out Time (Joe Bravo)
- 1997 - Mellow Roll (Frank Lovoto Jr)
- 1996 - Kashatreya (Juilo Pezua)
- 1995 - Carrbine Special (Robbie Davis)
- 1994 - Outlaw (Robbie Davis)
