= Sepfourteen =

Philippine racehorse (born 2014)

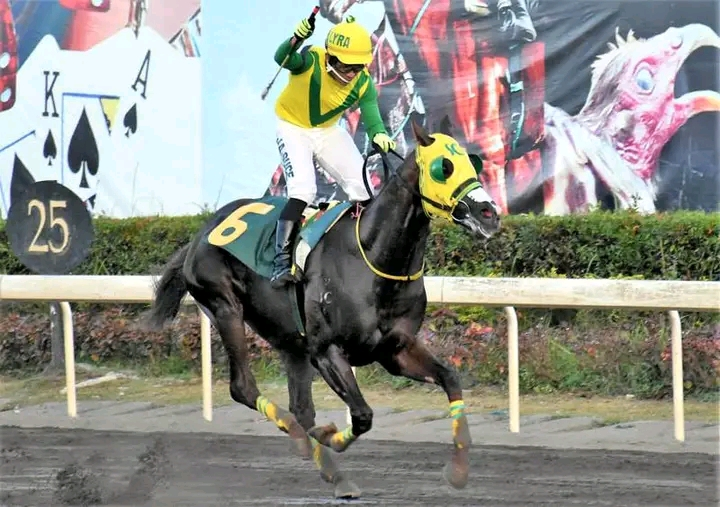
- Sepfourteen in the 2018 PCSO Presidential Gold Cup
- Sire: Juvenile Consolidator (USA)
- Grandsire: Storm Cat (USA)
- Dam: Regal Boom (AUS)
- Damsire: Thunder Gulch (USA)
- Sex: Stallion
- Foaled: May 13, 2014 (age 12)
- Country: Philippines
- Color: Chestnut
- Breeder: Jojo Velasquez
- Owner: Jojo Velasquez
- Trainer: Tomasito Santos
- Jockey: Alvin Guce

Major wins
- 1st Leg Triple Crown Stakes Race (2017); 2nd Leg Triple Crown Stakes Race (2017); 3rd Leg Triple Crown Stakes Race (2017); Presidential Gold Cup (2018)

Awards
- Philracom Triple Crown (2017)

Honors
- Philracom Top Earning Horse (2019)

Sepfourteen is a Filipino Thoroughbred racehorse who is the 2017 Philracom Triple Crown champion and the 2018 Presidential Gold Cup champion.

== Background ==
Sepfourteen was foaled on May 13, 2014, and was raised by his owner, Jojo Velasquez, at the Santa Clara Stockfarm in Santo Tomas, Batangas. He is a progeny of Regal Boom, an Australian import and one of the first horses brought in by SC Stockfarm. The sire of Sepfourteen is Juvenile Consolidator who was brought in from the United States by PHILTOBO president Manny Santos in 2011.

Sepfourteen was initially offered for sale by Velasquez for ₱600,000, but potential buyers declined due to skepticism on the horse's physique. As a result, Velasquez decided to name the horse himself and race him under his ownership.

The chesnut-coated colt was named in reference to Velasquez's birthday, September 14. He was trained by Tomasito Santos.

== Horse racing career ==
Sepfourteen was already racing as a two-year-old in 2016. He later captured the Philracom Triple Crown title, winning all three races of the 2017 series. Ridden by jockey Alvin Guce, Sepfourteen became the eleventh horse to achieve the feat. He also won the 2018 Presidential Gold Cup.

Sepfourteen was recognized at the 2019 Philippine Racing Commission (Philracom) Awards as the Top Earning Horse of the Year for the prize money he garnered the previous year.

== Stud record ==
Sepfourteen only bred with 2 mares at the start of his breeding career, District One was the result of the breeding. She is a filly who won the 2025 Champion Three-Year-Old Filly of the Year and shared the Horse of the Year awards with Jungkook on the Philtobo 28th Gintong Hari Awards.

=== Notable progeny ===
c = colt, f = filly

Foaled	Name	Sex	Major Wins
2022	District One	f	1st Leg Locally Bred Stakes, 2nd Leg Hopeful Stakes, 3rd Leg Philracom Triple Crown.

== Pedigree ==
Pedigree of Sepfourteen (PHI), chestnut stallion, 2014
Sire Consolidator (USA) 2002	Storm Cat (USA); 1983	Storm Bird (CAN); 1978	Northern Dancer (CAN); 1961
Sire Consolidator (USA) 2002	Storm Cat (USA); 1983	Storm Bird (CAN); 1978	South Ocean (CAN); 1967
Sire Consolidator (USA) 2002	Storm Cat (USA); 1983	Terlingua (USA); 1976	Secretariat (USA); 1970
Sire Consolidator (USA) 2002	Storm Cat (USA); 1983	Terlingua (USA); 1976	Crimson Saint (USA); 1969
Sire Consolidator (USA) 2002	Good Example (FR); 1986	Blushing Groom (FR); 1974	Red God (USA); 1954
Sire Consolidator (USA) 2002	Good Example (FR); 1986	Blushing Groom (FR); 1974	Runaway Bride (GB); 1962
Sire Consolidator (USA) 2002	Good Example (FR); 1986	Divona (USA); 1974	Nodouble (USA); 1965
Sire Consolidator (USA) 2002	Good Example (FR); 1986	Divona (USA); 1974	Nancy Jr (USA); 1964
Dam Regal Bloom (AUS) 2001	Thunder Gulch (USA); 1992	Gulch (USA); 1984	Mr. Prospector (USA); 1970
Dam Regal Bloom (AUS) 2001	Thunder Gulch (USA); 1992	Gulch (USA); 1984	Jameela (USA); 1976
Dam Regal Bloom (AUS) 2001	Thunder Gulch (USA); 1992	Line of Thunder (USA); 1987	Storm Bird (CAN); 1978
Dam Regal Bloom (AUS) 2001	Thunder Gulch (USA); 1992	Line of Thunder (USA); 1987	Shoot A Line (GB); 1977
Dam Regal Bloom (AUS) 2001	Noble Deed (NZ); 1993	Noble Bijou (USA); 1971	Vaguely Noble (IRE); 1965
Dam Regal Bloom (AUS) 2001	Noble Deed (NZ); 1993	Noble Bijou (USA); 1971	Priceless Gem (USA); 1963
Dam Regal Bloom (AUS) 2001	Noble Deed (NZ); 1993	Lamp Light (NZ); 1974	Mellay (GB); 1961
Dam Regal Bloom (AUS) 2001	Noble Deed (NZ); 1993	Lamp Light (NZ); 1974	Rich Light (NZ)(Family: 1-n); 1963
