= Doug O'Neill =

American racehorse trainer

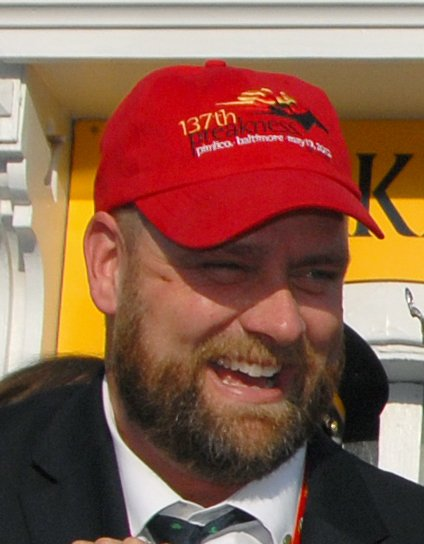
- Doug O'Neill at 2012 Preakness Stakes.

Personal information
- Born: May 24, 1968 (age 58) Dearborn, Michigan, U.S.
- Occupation: Trainer

Horse racing career
- Sport: Horse racing
- Career wins: 2,907+ (ongoing)

Major racing wins
- Pacific Classic Stakes (2006, 2024); Pat O'Brien Stakes (2024); Fantasy Stakes (2000); Hollywood Gold Cup (2002, 2005, 2006, 2007); Longacres Mile Handicap (2003); Palos Verdes Handicap (2003, 2021); Del Mar Breeders' Cup Mile (2004, 2010); Las Virgenes Stakes (2005); San Marcos Stakes (2005); Awesome Again Stakes (2006,2023); Santa Ynez Stakes (2005); Charles Whittingham Memorial Handicap (2006); Goodwood Breeders' Cup Handicap (2006); Lane's End Breeders' Futurity; Santa Anita Handicap (2006); Santa Barbara Handicap (2006); Santa Anita Handicap (2006, 2007); Sunshine Millions Classic (2006); Godolphin Mile (2007); Robert B. Lewis Stakes (2007, 2012); San Felipe Stakes (2007); Sunshine Millions Turf (2007); Donn Handicap (2008); Landaluce Stakes (2009); Santa Anita Derby (2012, 2013); Pat O'Brien Stakes (2014, 2023); Florida Derby (2016); Triple Bend Handicap (2017); Bluegrass Stakes (2017); Ohio Derby (2017); Indiana Derby (2017); Iowa Oaks (2017); Jeff Ruby Steaks (2018); Peter Pan Stakes (2018); Stephen Foster Handicap (2018); La Canada Stakes (2018); Schuylerville Stakes (2019); Pocahontas Stakes (2019); Pennsylvania Derby (2021); Los Alamitos Futurity (2021); Sunland Park Derby (2022); Del Mar Derby (2022); Lukas Classic Stakes (2022); Cotillion Stakes (2023) American Classics wins: Kentucky Derby (2012, 2016); Preakness Stakes (2012) Breeders' Cup wins: Breeders' Cup Juvenile (2005, 2015); Breeders' Cup Sprint (2006); Breeders' Cup Dirt Mile (2013); Breeders' Cup Filly & Mare Sprint (2007) International race wins: Japan Cup Dirt (2003); Godolphin Mile (2024,2025)

Honors
- California Thoroughbred Breeders' Association: Trainer of the Year (2002)

Significant horses
- Great Hunter, Hot Rod Charlie, I'll Have Another, Lava Man, Notional, Maryfield, Square Eddie, Stevie Wonderboy, Thor's Echo, Nyquist, Goldencents, Sky Jack, Irap
- Updated on July 15, 2017

Douglas F. O'Neill (born May 24, 1968) is an American Thoroughbred horse trainer. He was born in Dearborn, Michigan, and resides in California, where he trained the 2012 Kentucky Derby and Preakness Stakes winner, I'll Have Another, and 2016 Kentucky Derby winner Nyquist. O'Neill and his family reside in Santa Monica, California.

== Early years ==
O'Neill was born in Dearborn, Michigan and moved to Santa Monica, California when he was 10, where his father, Patrick, took him to watch horse racing at Santa Anita Park. O'Neill became a hot walker while in high school, then went to work at Del Mar racetrack, and obtained his trainer's license in 1989. His brother, Dennis, is a bloodstock agent and helps select horses at auction for clients.

By the early 2000s he was a major figure on the California racing scene, and at one time had the largest stable in Southern California, and one of the largest and most successful in the United States. O'Neill's first Grade 1 win came in 2002 when Sky Jack won the Hollywood Gold Cup. The win was the first time O'Neill had even entered a horse in a Grade 1 race.

He gained national attention for his Breeders' Cup wins and international recognition for winning the 2003 Japan Cup Dirt at Tokyo Racecourse.

J. Paul Reddam began sending horses to O'Neill in the mid-2000s and has since been one of O'Neill's most loyal clients. In 2006, O'Neill's horse Lava Man won the Santa Anita Derby, Hollywood Gold Cup, and Pacific Classic.

O'Neill's first horses to contest the Kentucky Derby were Liquidity and Great Hunter, both of whom raced in the 2007 Kentucky Derby.

=== 2012 season ===
I'll Have Another, owned by Canadian J. Paul Reddam and trained by O'Neill, won the 2012 Kentucky Derby on May 5, 2012. The horse also won the 2012 Preakness Stakes and was viewed as a potential Triple Crown winner. However, in the meantime, O'Neill's multiple violations of medication rules caught up with him and he was given a 45-day suspension, though because O'Neill's suspension was not set to begin prior to July 1, 2012, he was permitted to run I'll Have Another in the 2012 Belmont Stakes.

The race featured tightened security, including a "detention barn" where all entrants had to be stabled together in a specially designated barn, starting three days before the race. The potential for a Triple Crown also increased the scrutiny given the race. Furthermore, the New York Racing Association had also been taken over by the state of New York earlier in the year due to problems with horse deaths and questions surrounding "exotic bets."

O'Neill scratched I'll Have Another from the Belmont the day prior to the race, citing a tendon injury. The decision to scratch I'll Have Another was based on the O'Neill's monitoring of swelling in the horse's foreleg early in the week of the Belmont, and confirmation by Dr. James Hunt, a New York-based veterinarian, that the horse risked further injury if he ran. Racing fans and some commentators speculated that O'Neill scratched I'll Have Another not because of a relatively minor tendon injury, but because he "couldn't doctor the horse the way he needed to because of the detention barn." Others dismissed this as a conspiracy theory. John Sabini, chairman of the New York State Racing and Wagering Board stated that the decision to scratch the horse was disappointing but that the trainer and owner "put the welfare of the horse first, showing true horsemanship."

== 2015 season ==
In 2015, O'Neill began to train Nyquist, another Reddam-owned colt. Nyquist went into the 2015 Breeders' Cup with an undefeated record, won the 2015 Breeders' Cup Juvenile and went on to become the Eclipse Award American Champion Two-Year-Old Male Horse. In 2016, the undefeated colt moved to an 8:8-0-0 record by winning the 2016 Kentucky Derby with jockey Mario Gutierrez, who had also ridden I'll Have Another in 2012.

Nyquist currently stands at Jonabell Farm for Darley America's stud division having already produced Breeders' Cup Juvenile Fillies Winner Vequist, Summer Stakes (Canada) winner Gretzky the Great, and Queen Mary Stakes winner Crimson Advocate at Royal Ascot.

== Medication violations ==
In May 2012, after a two-year legal battle, the California Horse Racing Board (CHRB) found that O'Neill was responsible for a horse that tested with excess carbon dioxide levels above the permitted level of TCO2. As a result, though he was not found guilty of "milkshaking" the horse – providing an "illegal performance-enhancing mixture" – O'Neill was deemed responsible for the animal's care, barred from horse racing for 45 days, and fined $15,000.

A few days after I'll Have Another won the 2012 Derby, The New York Times writers Joe Drape and Walt Bogdanich ran a story discussing O'Neill's extensive history of medication violations. It ran on the front page of the paper. Additional criticism came from other quarters, including Frank Deford of NPR, who expressed his view that both O'Neill and the owner of I'll Have Another did not deserve to win the Belmont, describing O'Neill as "a charming enough character, but a drug cheat nonetheless." Due to the reports of multiple medication violations, O'Neill had been nicknamed "'Drug' O'Neill." However, some industry experts, such as Andrew Beyer of The Washington Post, felt that O'Neill was a skilled trainer who had made some mistakes but had been "maligned." Taking a middle ground, Bill Dwyre of the Los Angeles Times viewed O'Neill's violations as a "misdemeanor." Bogdanich found that O'Neill had 15 medication drug violations during his career and had "milkshaked" horses—an illegal treatment for fatigue that involves inserting a tube down a horse's esophagus to administer a mixture of substances. In a 2012 interview with NPR, Bogdanich criticized a lack of enforcement of drug rules in American horse racing, noting that although O'Neill faced a 180-day suspension for milkshaking, any punishment imposed upon him have would little impact on his livelihood: "He could turn it over to his assistants, his stable, and never miss a beat. The horses keep running. If they win, they keep getting their purses. You know, that's what America lacks that the rest of the world has. They have law and order." In October 2012, the Los Angeles Times ran a story on O'Neill's gregariousness and kindness to others, suggesting that jealousy motivated his detractors.

In October 2014, O'Neill was given another 45-day suspension as a result of a June 2013 violation at Belmont Park. By this time, O'Neill had accumulated 19 drug violations. The New York Racing Association also fined him $10,000. However, as happened in 2012, they agreed that he would not have to serve his suspension until after a major event, this time the 2014 Breeders' Cup. He was also given an additional 45-day suspended sentence, which would "be served if he incurs another medication violation before December 18, 2015, at any US track." Following his New York suspension, he was given a separate 45-day suspension in California, based on his violation of the CHRB restrictions from 2012 due to the 2013 New York violation. This suspension foreclosed his ability to train horses for the 2014 Breeders' Cup. In addition, California gave him an 18-month probation period on top of the 45 day ban, during which time he cannot have any further Class I, II, or III drug violations in any part of the USA or internationally. While his previous penalties were based upon the dates that assorted complaints were filed or adjudicated, this time the ruling was that the "deciding event" for any violation would be the date when the offense actually occurred. His assistant trainer was put in charge of conditioning horses for his stable, and one horse was transferred to a different trainer.

When the media spotlight turned to O'Neill in 2016, he chose not to discuss "stuff that happened in the past that I didn't do," but also said, "Those times have made us – me – realize I need to step up my game and really make sure we're on the same page."
