= Commentator (horse) =

American-bred Thoroughbred racehorse (2001–2025)

- Sire: Distorted Humor
- Grandsire: Forty Niner
- Dam: Outsource
- Damsire: Storm Bird
- Sex: Gelding
- Foaled: 2001
- Country: United States
- Colour: Chestnut
- Breeder: Michael Martinez
- Owner: Tracy Farmer
- Trainer: Nick Zito
- Record: 24: 14–1–4
- Earnings: $2,029,845

Major wins
- Perryville Stakes (2004); Whitney Handicap (2005, 2008); Mugatea Stakes (2006); Massachusetts Handicap (2008)

Awards
- New York Horse of the Year (2007, 2008)
- Last updated on June 12, 2009

Commentator (foaled March 27, 2001 – June 27, 2025) was an American-bred Thoroughbred racehorse. He had the same sire as 2003 Kentucky Derby winner Funny Cide; the two half-brothers had a notable resemblance.

Commentator's dam, Outsource, was a daughter of Storm Bird, a champion at age two in both England and Ireland and a stamina-producing sire. Outsource was born small and deformed; she was never raced nor trained. Instead, she was bred to Distorted Humor at only two years of age, and the result was Commentator, making Outsource one of the youngest mares ever to produce a Grade I winner.

Bred by Michael Martinez in New York, Commentator went for $45,000 as a weanling (hip # 3230) in the Keeneland November Breeding Stock Sale. As a yearling, his price was $135,000 when he went to Tracy Farmer, who owned him until his retirement to Old Friends. From the beginning, he was trained by Hall of Fame trainer Nick Zito.

At three, Commentator won the seven-furlong Perryville Stakes, setting a track record of 1:25.19. At four, on August 5, 2005, he went wire to wire in the Grade I nine-furlong Whitney Handicap, beating that year's American Horse of the Year Saint Liam. 32,287 people crowded onto the Saratoga Race Course to watch Commentator, ridden by Gary Stevens, set the pace, then seem to tire as Saint Liam made his move. But Commentator dug in, beating Saint Liam to the finish wire. At five, he won the Mugatea Stakes at Belmont Park and at six, he placed in the Tom Fool Handicap, then took the Richmond Runner Stakes for New York–breds by 11 1/4 lengths. In the Richmond Runner, he ran 6 1/2 furlongs in 1:15.69.

On October 27, 2007, entered in the Breeders' Cup Sprint at Monmouth Park, Commentator finished seventh on a very “sloppy track.” In January 2008, he won a Gulfstream Park allowance race in a 14 1/2-length romp that set a track record. Under jockey John Velazquez, he went 1:33:71 for a mile on the “fast” track.

Commentator, again ridden by Velazquez, won the Grade II Richter Scale Breeders' Cup Sprint Championship Handicap on March 9, 2008, by 13 ¾ lengths. Pushed by Elite Squadron through early fractions of 22 seconds and 45.04, he led by five lengths at the top of the lane and then increased his lead with every stride. Track announcer Larry Colmus called, "Here comes Commentator, the fastest horse in America." Asked to comment on that call, Zito said, "Not only is that plausible, it has the added advantage of maybe being true." Commentator covered the Richter Scale's seven furlongs in 1:23.23.

On May 26, 2008, he ran second in the Metropolitan Handicap at Belmont Park. On July 26, 2008, he took his second Whitney Handicap wire-to-wire; at age 7, he became the second-oldest horse to win that race. With that win, he gained an automatic entry into the 2008 Breeders' Cup Classic. Zito expressed a slight reluctance to ship Commentator to California's synthetic surface for the Breeders' Cup, to be run at Santa Anita in 2008.

On September 20, 2008, Commentator won the final running of the Massachusetts Handicap at Suffolk Downs by 12 lengths.

Commentator was a finalist for the Eclipse Award's American Champion Older Male Horse for 2008 (won by Curlin). In 2005 and 2008, Commentator was New York Horse of Year.

On June 12, 2009, 8-year-old Commentator easily took the Kashatreya Stakes at Belmont Park by seven lengths.

== Retirement and death ==
After showing in the 2009 Whitney, Commentator's owners announced his retirement. He earned over $2 million, set two track records, and at the age of seven held the highest Beyer speed figures for distances both under and over a mile.

On September 6, 2009, the New York Racing Association (NYRA) paid tribute to Commentator at Saratoga Race Course. They named that day's fifth race, an overnight stakes race for New York–bred 3-year-olds and up, “The Commentator Stakes.” Commentator himself galloped onto the track to lead the post parade, afterwards receiving a peppermint key to the city of Saratoga Springs.

Tracy and Carol Farmer chose Old Friends Thoroughbred Retirement Farm as his permanent home. Originally retired to their location in Georgetown, Kentucky, Commentator was moved to Old Friends at Cabin Creek in Greenfield Center, New York in 2016, where he remained for the rest of his life.

On June 27, 2025, at age 24, Commentator was euthanized due to long-term complications from Potomac horse fever.

== Pedigree ==
Pedigree of Commentator, chestnut gelding, 2001
Sire Distorted Humor	Forty Niner	Mr. Prospector	Raise a Native
Sire Distorted Humor	Forty Niner	Mr. Prospector	Gold Digger
Sire Distorted Humor	Forty Niner	File	Tom Rolfe
Sire Distorted Humor	Forty Niner	File	Continue
Sire Distorted Humor	Danzig's Beauty	Danzig	Northern Dancer
Sire Distorted Humor	Danzig's Beauty	Danzig	Pas de Nom
Sire Distorted Humor	Danzig's Beauty	Sweetest Chant	Mr. Leader
Sire Distorted Humor	Danzig's Beauty	Sweetest Chant	Gay Sonnet
Dam Outsource	Storm Bird	Northern Dancer	Nearctic
Dam Outsource	Storm Bird	Northern Dancer	Natalma
Dam Outsource	Storm Bird	South Ocean	New Providence
Dam Outsource	Storm Bird	South Ocean	Shining Sun
Dam Outsource	True Grit	Woodman	Mr. Prospector
Dam Outsource	True Grit	Woodman	Playmate
Dam Outsource	True Grit	Quite Honestly	Believe It
Dam Outsource	True Grit	Quite Honestly	Tesao (family: 1-c)
