= California Cup Sprint =

The California Cup Sprint Handicap is an American thoroughbred horse race run annually at Santa Anita Park in Arcadia, California during its Oak Tree Racing Association meet in the fall of the year. Raced on dirt over a distance of six furlongs, it is open to horses three-year-olds and up of either gender who were bred in the state of California. The event currently offers a purse of $150,000 and a trophy.

The California Cup Sprint Handicap is part of the "California Cup Day" series of races intended to call attention to, and to honor, the California Thoroughbred racing and breeding industry.

== Past winners ==
- 2014 - Big Macher
- 2013 - NO RACE
- 2012 - Maui Mark
- 2011 - Courtside
- 2010 - Cost of Freedom
- 2009 - Dancing in Silks
- 2008 - Tribesman (Russell Baze) (owned by Kjell Qvale, last owner of Silky Sullivan)
- 2007 - Bilo
- 2006 - Da Stoops (Victor Espinoza)
- 2005 - Jet West
- 2004 - Areyoutalkintome
- 2003 - Green Team
- 2002 - Unlimited Value
- 2001 - Ceeband
- 2000 - Full Moon Madness
- 1999 - Love That Red
- 1998 - Big Jag
- 1997 - Red
- 1996 - Testimony
- 1995 - Wild Gold
- 1994 - Uncaged Fury
- 1993 - Softshoe Sure Shot
- 1992 - Answer Do
- 1991 - Letthebighossroll
- 1990 - Valiant Pete
