= 2012 Kentucky Derby =

Horse race

138th Kentucky Derby
- Kentucky Derby
- Official logo for the 2012 Kentucky Derby
- Location: Churchill Downs
- Date: May 5, 2012
- Winning horse: I'll Have Another
- Winning time: 2:01.83
- Starting price: 15:1
- Jockey: Mario Gutierrez
- Trainer: Doug O'Neill
- Owner: J. Paul Reddam
- Conditions: Fast
- Surface: Dirt
- Attendance: 165,307

The 138th Kentucky Derby was the running of the Kentucky Derby in 2012, and took place on May 5 at 6:24 pm Eastern Daylight Time (EDT) at Churchill Downs. Due to sponsorship, the race was known as the Kentucky Derby Presented by Yum! Brands. The race was televised in the United States on the NBC television network.

The race was won by I'll Have Another, ridden by Mario Gutierrez, with a time of 2:01.83, while favorite Bodemeister finished second and Dullahan was third.

A record crowd of 165,307 was on hand at the track for the race.

== Contenders ==
Prior to the race, the field was considered "unusually strong"; four time Derby winning trainer D. Wayne Lukas called it the "best bunch I've seen in a long time". The major contenders were Bodemeister (Arkansas Derby), Union Rags (Champagne, Fountain of Youth Stakes), Gemologist (Wood Memorial), Creative Cause (Norfolk, San Felipe Stakes), Take Charge Indy (Florida Derby), Dullahan (Blue Grass Stakes) and Hansen (Breeders' Cup Juvenile, Gotham Stakes). I'll Have Another went off as a relative longshot at 15:1 despite winning both the Robert B. Lewis and Santa Anita Derby.

== Race ==
Thunderstorms the night before led to the cancellation of morning training for the riders, and, at 8:00 am EST, the track was labeled "sloppy". However, closer to the race, conditions were upgraded to "fast", the best condition for a dirt track. My Adonis was drawn into the race as an also eligible entry. If there were any entries that scratched, My Adonis would have been able to start in the race.

Bodemeister, ridden by Mike E. Smith, was leading at the quarter-mile mark with a time of 22.32 seconds. Bodemeister maintained his lead at the half-mile mark, at 45.39 seconds. During the final furlong, I'll Have Another overtook Bodemeister to win by one and a half lengths. I'll Have Another was the first Kentucky Derby winner to win from post barrier 19, while Mario Gutierrez won on his first attempt in the Kentucky Derby. Union Rags, the second-favorite to win at 9:2 odds, finished seventh.

All-sources wagering on the Kentucky Derby race was also record setting, up 18.8% from 112.0-million to $133.1-million. The previous record for all-sources wagering on the Kentucky Derby race was $118.4-million and was established in 2006.

== Payout ==
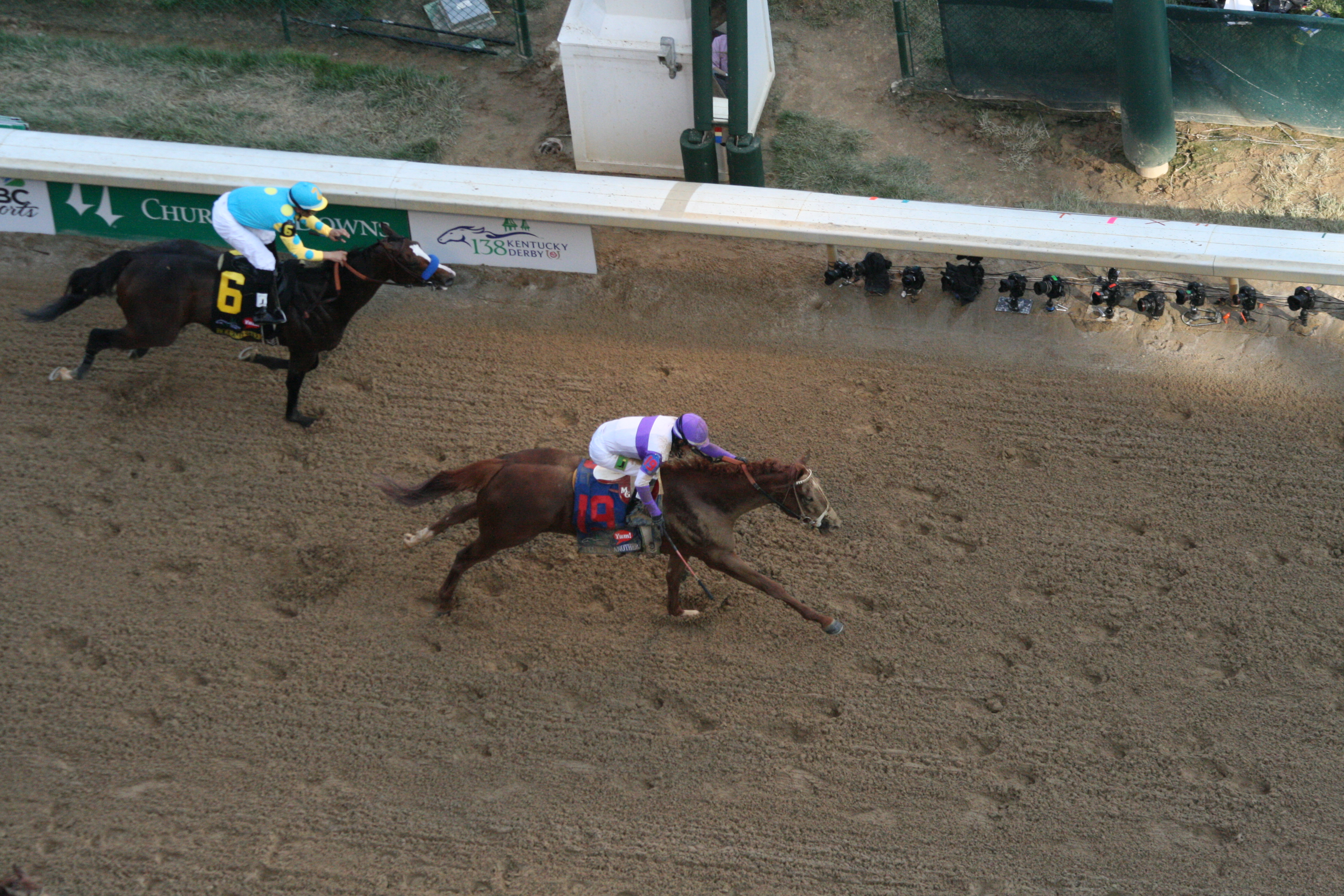
I'll Have Another (#19) crosses the finish line at the 2012 Kentucky Derby ahead of Bodemeister (far left).

The 138th Kentucky Derby Payout Schedule

Program Number	Horse Name	Win	Place	Show
19	I'll Have Another	US$32.60	$13.80	$9.00
6	Bodemeister	–	$6.20	$5.60
5	Dullahan	–	–	$7.20

- $2 Exacta: (19–6) paid $306.60
- $1 Trifecta: (19–6–5) paid $1,532.80
- $1 Superfecta: (19–6–5–13) paid $48,046.40

== Field ==
The field was announced on May 2, 2012.

Position	Post	Horse	Jockey	Trainer	Morning Line Odds	Final Odds	Winnings
1	19	I'll Have Another	Mario Gutierrez	Doug O'Neill	12:1	15.3	$1,459,600
2	6	Bodemeister	Mike E. Smith	Bob Baffert	4:1	4.2	$400,000
3	5	Dullahan	Kent Desormeaux	Dale Romans	8:1	12.1	$200,000
4	13	Went The Day Well	John R. Velazquez	H. Graham Motion	20:1	30.6	$100,000
5	8	Creative Cause	Joel Rosario	Mike Harrington	12:1	11.9	$60,000
6	20	Liaison	Martin Garcia	Bob Baffert	50:1	56.2	
7	4	Union Rags	Julien Leparoux	Michael R. Matz	9:2	5.1	
8	7	Rousing Sermon	Jose Lezcano	Jerry Hollendorfer	50:1	40.7	
9	14	Hansen	Ramon A. Dominguez	Michael J. Maker	10:1	13.1	
10	10	Daddy Nose Best	Garrett Gomez	Steve Asmussen	15:1	14	
11	2	Optimizer	Jon Court	D. Wayne Lukas	50:1	42.4	
12	11	Alpha	Rajiv Maragh	Kiaran McLaughlin	15:1	19.6	
13	16	El Padrino	Rafael Bejarano	Todd Pletcher	20:1	29.4	
14	17	Done Talking	Sheldon Russell	Hamilton Smith	50:1	39.4	
15	18	Sabercat	Corey Nakatani	Steve Asmussen	30:1	37.8	
16	15	Gemologist	Javier Castellano	Todd Pletcher	6:1	8.6	
17	9	Trinniberg	Willie Martinez	Bisnath Parboo	50:1	44.9	
18	12	Prospective	Luis Contreras	Mark E. Casse	30:1	57.9	
19	3	Take Charge Indy	Calvin Borel	Patrick B. Byrne	15:1	11.90	
DNF	1	Daddy Long Legs	Colm O'Donoghue	Aidan O'Brien	30:1	26	

- Margins – 1 1/2 lengths, neck
- Time – 2:01:83
- Track – Fast

== Subsequent Grade I wins ==
Several horses in the Derby went on to subsequent Grade I wins.

- I'll Have Another – Preakness Stakes
- Union Rags – Belmont Stakes
- Dullahan – Pacific Classic
- Alpha – Travers Stakes, 2013 Woodward Stakes
- Trinniberg – Breeders' Cup Sprint
