= Mario Gutierrez (jockey) =

Mexican horse racing jockey (born 1987)

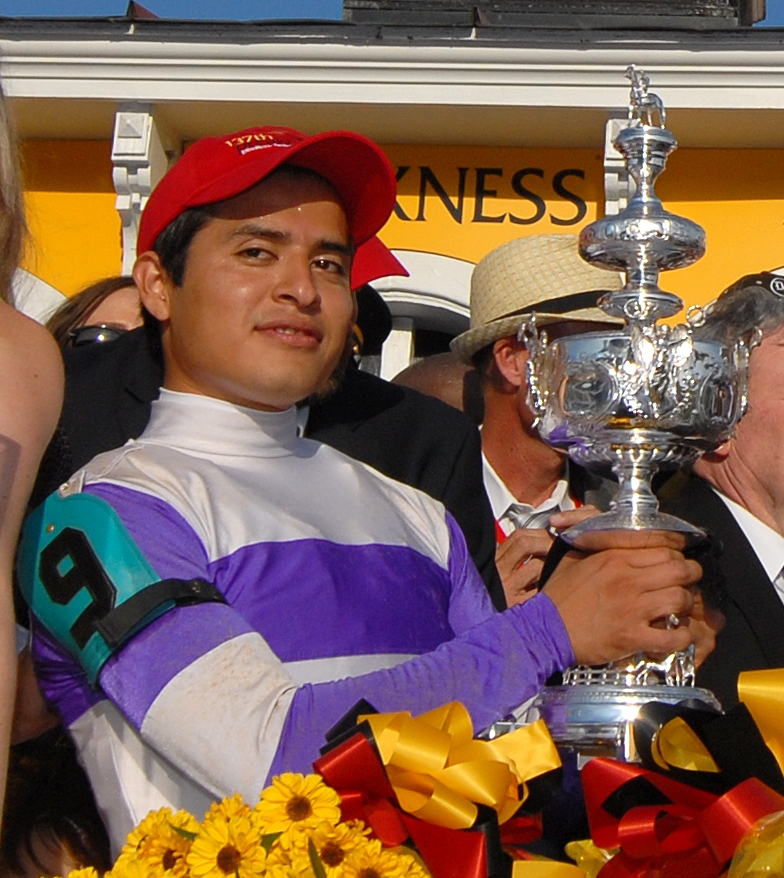
- Mario Gutierrez with 2012 Preakness Stakes trophy

Personal information
- Born: September 19, 1986 (age 40) Veracruz, Mexico
- Occupation: Jockey

Horse racing career
- Sport: Horse racing
- Career wins: 1,257 (as of 6/23/2021)

Major racing wins
- British Columbia Premiers Handicap (2007); Ballerina Stakes (2009); Wilshire Handicap (2012); Robert B. Lewis Stakes (2012); Santa Anita Derby (2012); Kentucky Derby (2012); Preakness Stakes (2012); Royal Heroine Mile Stakes (2012); Longacres Mile Handicap (2012, 2016); Sorrento Stakes (2013); —; American Classic Race wins: Kentucky Derby (2012, 2016); Preakness Stakes (2012); —; Breeders' Cup wins: Breeders' Cup Juvenile (2015)

Racing awards
- Hastings Park Champion Jockey (2007, 2008)

Significant horses
- I'll Have Another, Nyquist

Mario Gutierrez (Spanish pronunciation: [ˈmaɾjo ɣuˈtjeres]; born c. 1987) is a Mexican Thoroughbred horse racing jockey who won the 2012 Santa Anita Derby, Kentucky Derby and Preakness Stakes aboard I'll Have Another, a colt owned by Windsor, Ontario, native J. Paul Reddam and his wife, Zillah. He also won the 2016 Kentucky Derby aboard Nyquist, also owned by Reddam and trained by Doug O'Neill.

== Biography ==
The son of a jockey, Gutierrez rode Quarter Horses in his native El Higo, Veracruz, and in Mexico City beginning at age 14. In 2006 he emigrated to Canada where he began riding at Hastings Racecourse in Vancouver, British Columbia, and where he won riding titles in 2007 and 2008.

In 2012 he rode I'll Have Another and won the February 4 Robert B. Lewis Stakes at Santa Anita Park in Arcadia, California. The pair followed up with a win in the April 7 Santa Anita Derby, and on May 5, 2012, in what then retired U.S. Racing Hall of Fame jockey and NBC race commenter Gary Stevens called a "masterful ride," won the Kentucky Derby.

It was the Derby debut for the 25-year-old jockey. After the race, Gutierrez described I'll Have Another as "an amazing horse", and said that "from the first time I met him, I knew he was the one."

=== Year-end charts ===
| Chart (2012–present) | Peak position |
|---|---|
| National Earnings List for Jockeys 2012 | 40 |
| National Earnings List for Jockeys 2013 | 62 |
| National Earnings List for Jockeys 2015 | 29 |
