= Forty Niner (horse) =

American Thoroughbred racehorse

- Sire: Mr. Prospector
- Grandsire: Raise a Native
- Dam: File
- Damsire: Tom Rolfe
- Sex: Stallion
- Foaled: May 11, 1985
- Died: May 18, 2020 (aged 35)
- Country: United States
- Colour: Chestnut
- Breeder: Claiborne Farm
- Owner: Claiborne Farm
- Trainer: Woody Stephens
- Record: 19: 11-5-0
- Earnings: $2,726,000

Major wins
- Sanford Stakes (1987); Breeders' Futurity Stakes (1987); Belmont Futurity Stakes (1987); Champagne Stakes (1987); Lafayette Stakes (1988); Fountain of Youth Stakes (1988); Haskell Invitational Handicap (1988); NYRA Mile Handicap (1988); Travers Stakes (1988); American Classic Race placing: Kentucky Derby 2nd (1988)

Awards
- United States Champion 2-Yr-Old Colt (1987)

Honours
- Aiken Thoroughbred Racing Hall of Fame (1988); Grade III Forty Niner Stakes (2023– ) at Aqueduct
- Last updated on 11 October 2023

Forty Niner (11 May 1985 – 18 May 2020) was an American champion thoroughbred racehorse and influential stallion.

== Background ==
Forty Niner was sired by Champion sire Mr. Prospector out of the mare File. He was bred and raced by Claiborne Farm.

== Racing career ==
Forty Niner was the U.S. Champion colt at age two after major wins in the Champagne Stakes, Belmont Futurity Stakes and Breeders' Futurity Stakes.

Forty Niner was one of the Winterbook betting favorites to win the 1988 Kentucky Derby. Although he drew the disadvantageous post position seventeen in the Derby, with Pat Day riding, he quickly moved into contention early, then dropped back, but came with a strong stretch drive and finished a fast-closing second by a neck to the filly Winning Colors. In the second leg of the U.S. Triple Crown series, the Preakness Stakes, he finished seventh to winner Risen Star after being sent into an early speed duel with Winning Colors.

Forty Niner did not run in the Belmont Stakes, but in the summer and fall, he won the important Grade 1 Travers Stakes (with Chris McCarron riding) at Saratoga Race Course and Haskell Invitational Handicap (with Laffit Pincay, Jr. aboard) at Monmouth Park over rival Seeking the Gold in both races by a nose. He then finished second to Alysheba in the Woodward Stakes at Belmont Park and won the NYRA Mile Handicap before his fourth-place finish in his final career start in the Breeders' Cup Classic at Churchill Downs to Alysheba.

== Stud record ==
Retired to stud duty after the 1988 racing season, Forty Niner notably sired Distorted Humor, Coronado's Quest, Ecton Park, and Belmont Stakes winner Editor's Note. He also sired a half thoroughbred half Paint horse, Fifty. Fifty is a world class Performance horse shown with Dubin farms and currently Sinclair Performance Horses. Forty Niner is also the grandsire of Sharp Humor, 2003 Kentucky Derby winner Funny Cide Japan's Admire Moon, and the Philippines' Hagdang Bato, winner of the 2012 Philippine triple crown. He is the great-grandsire, through Distorted Humor, of 2012 Kentucky Derby winner I'll Have Another.

He was leading freshman sire in 1992 and third leading sire by U.S. earnings in 1996. His son End Sweep gained leading freshman sire honors in 1998. In 2009, grandson Twin Sparks set a new world record for six furlongs on dirt.

Forty Niner was sent to Japan in 1995 and stood at the Shizunai Stallion Station, where he was pensioned in 2007. The most successful of his Japanese offspring included Meiner Select (JBC Sprint), Utopia (Mile Championship Nambu Hai) and Admire Hope (Zen-Nippon Nisai Yushun). He died in Japan on 18 May 2020 due to the infirmities of old age, one week after his 35th birthday.
