= J. Paul Reddam =

Canadian businessman

- Born: July 28, 1955 (age 71); Windsor, Ontario, Canada
- Education: University of Windsor (B.A.); University of Toronto (M.A.); University of Southern California (Ph.D.)
- Occupation: Businessman
- Spouse: Zillah

John Paul Reddam (born July 28, 1955) is a Canadian businessman, Thoroughbred racehorse owner and a former professor of philosophy at California State University, Los Angeles.

== Biography ==
=== Career ===
Known by his middle name, J. Paul Reddam was born in Windsor, Ontario, Canada, and graduated from the University of Windsor with a bachelor's degree in psychology. He then obtained a master's degree in philosophy from the University of Toronto. In 1979, he moved to California to earn his Ph.D. at the University of Southern California and made his home in the state. Reddam wrote his Ph.D. dissertation, entitled "Pragmatics and the Language of Belief," in 1982, focusing on "pragmatic theories of belief ascription."

In 1995, he established a mortgage lending company, Ditech, and sold the business to General Motors in 1999. The New York Times reported that Governor of California Jerry Brown characterized Reddam's company's debt collection methods as loan sharking.

He now owns CashCall, Inc., another firm specializing in small loans at very high interest rates. CashCall settled a lawsuit against it for $5 million for predatory lending.

As of 2020, he is running a successor to Cash Call named Owning.com that specializes in high balance, low LTV loans in California.

=== Horse racing ===
As a young man, Reddam became interested in the harness races held at Windsor Raceway that eventually led to his involvement as an owner while working as a university professor in Los Angeles. He used to have Standardbred horses competing at Windsor Raceway (has since closed down) and at Cal Expo in Sacramento, California. In 1988 he acquired his first Thoroughbred and has expanded his involvement to a current forty-horse racing stable plus twenty broodmares for his own breeding operations through arrangements with breeding farms in California and Kentucky.

Widely respected in the industry for his strong support of Thoroughbred racing, Reddam's first major success came in 2004 with a win by 75%-owned Wilko in the Breeders' Cup Juvenile and his next in 2006 with Red Rocks in the Breeders' Cup Turf. His Thoroughbred racing stable is led by head trainer Doug O'Neill, with several horses being conditioned by Craig Dollase. His greatest achievement came when his colt I'll Have Another, from 19th position, won the 2012 Kentucky Derby and the 2012 Preakness Stakes. The New York Times reported that the trainer used by Reddam was suspended for drug violation. His horse Nyquist won the Kentucky Derby in 2016. Nyquist and I'll Have Another were both trained by Doug O'Neill and won the 2012 and 2016 Kentucky Derby races with jockey Mario Gutierrez.

=== Controversies ===
Reddam resigned from Ditech in May 2000 after three of his top managers were indicted for extortion. Gregory Kenneth DeLong, Vincent Pozzuoli and Jay David Marx were arrested for allegedly soliciting kickbacks from a Pittsburgh company that provided services for Ditech.

Reddam sued GMAC Mortgage Corp in 2000, alleging that the company failed to pay $200 million that it owed after acquiring Ditech.

In 2013, Reddam was sued by the Consumer Financial Protection Bureau for violating consumer protection laws in a case related to Cashcall and other companies he was involved in.
