= Horse racing in the Philippines =

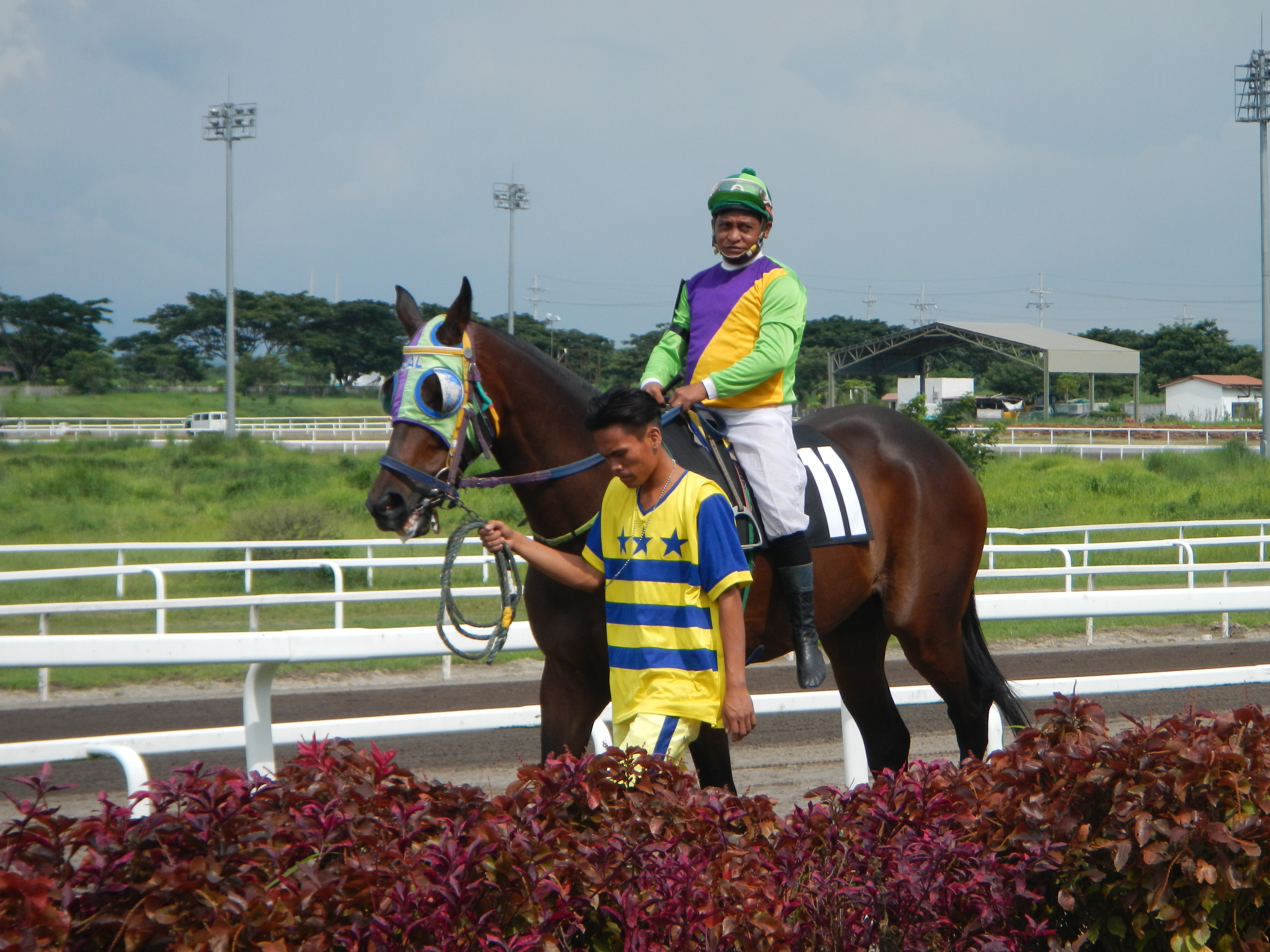
A Filipino jockey on his racehorse, being escorted to the tracks, at the Saddle & Clubs Leisure Park (Santa Ana Park) Race Track at Sabang, Naic, Cavite in the Philippines, on July 21, 2013.

Horseracing in the Philippines began as a recreational activity in 1867. Its history is divided into three major time periods based on the breed of horses raced, in conjunction with the three significant eras of Philippine history. According to the type of horses used, the periods are the Philippine-pony era (1867–1898), the Arabian-horse era (1898–1930), and the Thoroughbred era (1935–present).

The Philippine-pony era refers to the time when the Philippines was under Spanish control. At that time, racehorses were bred from the German, Persian, and Israeli lineages of the Classical period in Philippine history, 900–1521.

The Arabian-horse era refers to the time when the "American Philippines" were a territory of the United States, 1898–1946, although the Arabian-horse era only lasted until 1935.

The Thoroughbred era (1935–present) replaced the breeding of Arabian for horseracing with local breeds; the era continued when the Philippines became an independent republic in 1946.

== Spanish era (1521–1898) ==
=== Philippine-pony era (1867–1898) ===
==== Straight-way course ====
The earliest record of horseracing in the Philippines was in 1867. At that time a straight flat course measuring 1/4 mile (402 m) was used. From 1867 to approximately 1881, the common breed of horses used were those whose lineage were of Suluan, Indian, and Chinese stock. Also in 1867, the Manila Jockey Club (MJC) was founded by Philippine Governor-General José de la Gandara y Navarro, a Spaniard, together with the club's founding members (the socios fundadores, literally meaning "founding partners"). The MJC was the first racing club established in Southeast Asia, with 100 founding partners from the "prominent and affluent families" of the time period, including Spaniards, Filipinos, and English. These families include the Ayalas, the Zobels, the Tuasons, the Elizaldes, the Bousteads, and the Prietos.

Because the MJC was established as a social and recreation club, from 1867 through the 1870s only "fun runs" without betting were held annually, during April or May. The straight course ran from the Basilica of San Sebastian, Manila up to the Quiapo Church. The jockeys for the carreras officiales ("official races") were restricted to club members. The prizes for the winning jockeys included a gold medal, a silver medal, and an ornamental watch.

==== English-style oval horseracing ====
English-style horseracing was first used in the Philippines from 1881, being held twice yearly for four consecutive days. The event was supported by Governor-General Eulogio Despujol. The location was moved in 1881 from the MJC in Quiapo, Manila to the oval of the Hippodromo de Santa Mesa (Santa Mesa Hippodrome) in the district of Santa Mesa, also in Spanish Manila, next to the Pasig River; by 1880 Quiapo had become crammed with shops and businessmen's residences. The new location was a ricefield rented by the club from the Tuasons, a family club member. The grandstand next to the new oval track was made of nipa and bamboo. Back then, horseraces on the oval track ran clockwise, like in England, but nowadays they run counter-clockwise, like in the United States.

The horseracing activities of the MJC were suspended during the 1896 Philippine Revolution, a conflict between Spanish soldiers and Filipino revolutionaries. They resumed after the ratification of the 1897 Pact of Biak-na-Bato. The truce was celebrated in Manila with a fiesta in Manila for the entire month of January 1898. The MJC intended to celebrate the truce by holding a race known as the Gran Copa de Manila ("Grand Manila Cup") in May 1898. The prize trophy for the winning horse rider would have been a 22-inch (56 cm) silver cup made in Hong Kong, embellished with horses' heads and a likeness of Justitia, the goddess of justice. But it was not to be, because in 1898 horseracing in the Philippines was suspended with the onset of the Spanish–American War, that lasted from April 25 until August 12, 1898. The Gran Copa trophy was sent by the MJC to the Shanghai Bank in Hong Kong for safekeeping, and was only returned in 1937, after 38 years.

== American era (1898–1946) ==
After the Spanish–American War, the Philippines became a territory of the United States, because Spain opted to make peace with the United States. resulting in the 1898 Treaty of Paris (1898), where Spain negotiated on terms favorable to the US, allowing temporary American control of Cuba, and ceding indefinite colonial authority over Puerto Rico, Guam and the Philippine islands – as island possessions – to the US.

=== Arabian-horse era (1898–1955) ===
Horseracing at the Santa Mesa Hippodrome (also known as the Santa Mesa Oval) resumed in the Philippines in 1899. In 1900, the MJC was moved to San Lazaro in the district of Santa Cruz, Tayuman in Manila (the MJC is currently known as the San Lazaro Leisure & Business Park). The site measured 16 hectares (40 acres) and had a grandstand and a 1200-meter or six-furlong track. In 1901, during the term of American Governor-General William Howard Taft, the "democratization of horseracing" allowed "people from all social strata" to go to the hippodrome during horseracing days. Betting was introduced and permitted in 1903. In 1930, foreign breeds such as Arabian horses were imported by the Bureau of Agriculture. Also in 1930, the Bureau of Animal Industry was established, and continued to import Arabian horses.

During this time, there were two other racetracks that tried to compete with the MJC: the Pasay Country Club (between Harrison Street and Vito Cruz Street) and another in Cebu. Neither lasted long.

=== Thoroughbred-era (1935–present) started ===
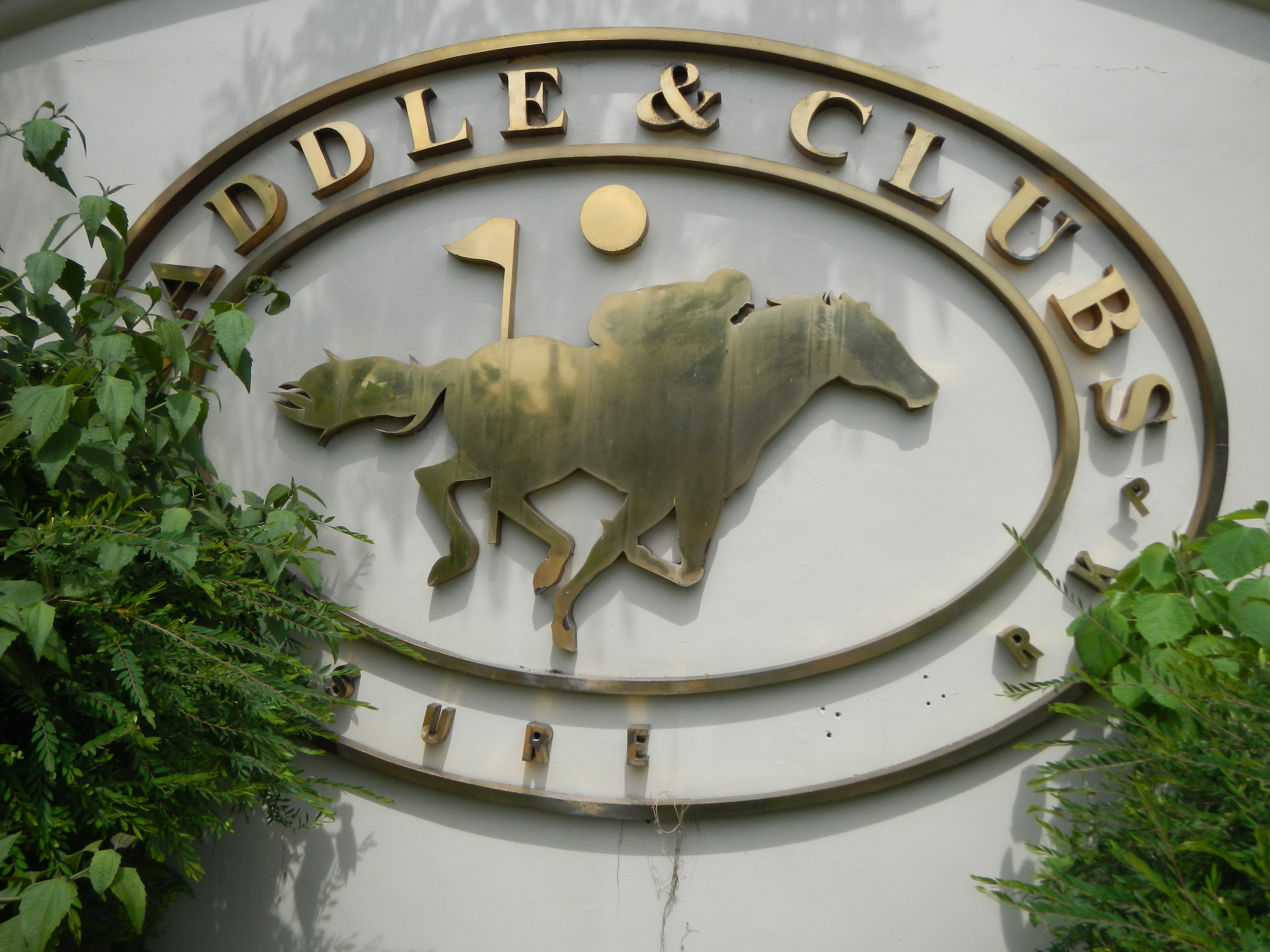
The logo of the Philippine Racing Club's "Saddle & Clubs Leisure Park" in Naic, Cavite, Philippines (2013).

In 1935, the Philippine Legislature signed Act No. 4130 (Note: Contrary to what the reference states, this is probably not an Act of the Republic, because the Philippines was a Commonwealth in 1935, an associated state of the United States; thus in this article, it is only referred to as "Act No. 4130" until another source can be found.) This law authorized the holding of Sweepstakes Races by the Philippine Charity Sweepstakes Office, which replaced the National Charity Sweepstakes on October 30, 1934. The MJC became incorporated in 1937, becoming the Manila Jockey Club, Inc. (MJCI), transforming from a social association into a business.

In 1937, the Philippine Racing Club was established in Makati and became a competitor to the MJCI. Established by Filipino and American businessmen, the Philippine Racing Club (PRC) was also organized for the purpose of using horse breeds of "superior quality" for horseracing. In 1939, Commonwealth Act No. 156 was enforced. This Commonwealth Act was later amended through Commonwealth Act No. 156. The purpose of Commonwealth Act No. 156 was to include the Philippine Tuberculosis Society Inc. in the holding of yearly National Grand Derby Races, with the goal of promoting the breeding of local or native horses in the Philippines.

At the beginning of the 1940s, when Rafael Roces became the president of MJCI, he introduced two types of bet on the horseracing menu: the "daily double" bet and the llave ("key") bet. The daily double bet is unique to the Philippines, and is not offered in other countries. The daily double bet is still popular today.

While under American possession, the Philippines became involved in World War II (1939–1945). Although the war began in 1939, it only started to affect the Philippines directly in 1941 when the United States entered. MJCI had to close for the duration of the war. From 1941, the Gran Copa trophy of the MJCI was kept by Dr. Salustiano Herrera, an officer of the club. The invading Japanese armed forces used the premises of the MJCI as their barracks. After World War II, the MJCI's buildings were converted by the Americans into a facility with "a hospital and a garrison".

Herrera returned the Gran Copa trophy to MJCI and it was installed in the Trophy Room.

== Independent-Republics era (1946–present) ==
After the Second World War, the Republic of the Philippines was officially recognized as an independent nation on July 4, 1946.

=== Thoroughbred-era (1935–present) continued ===
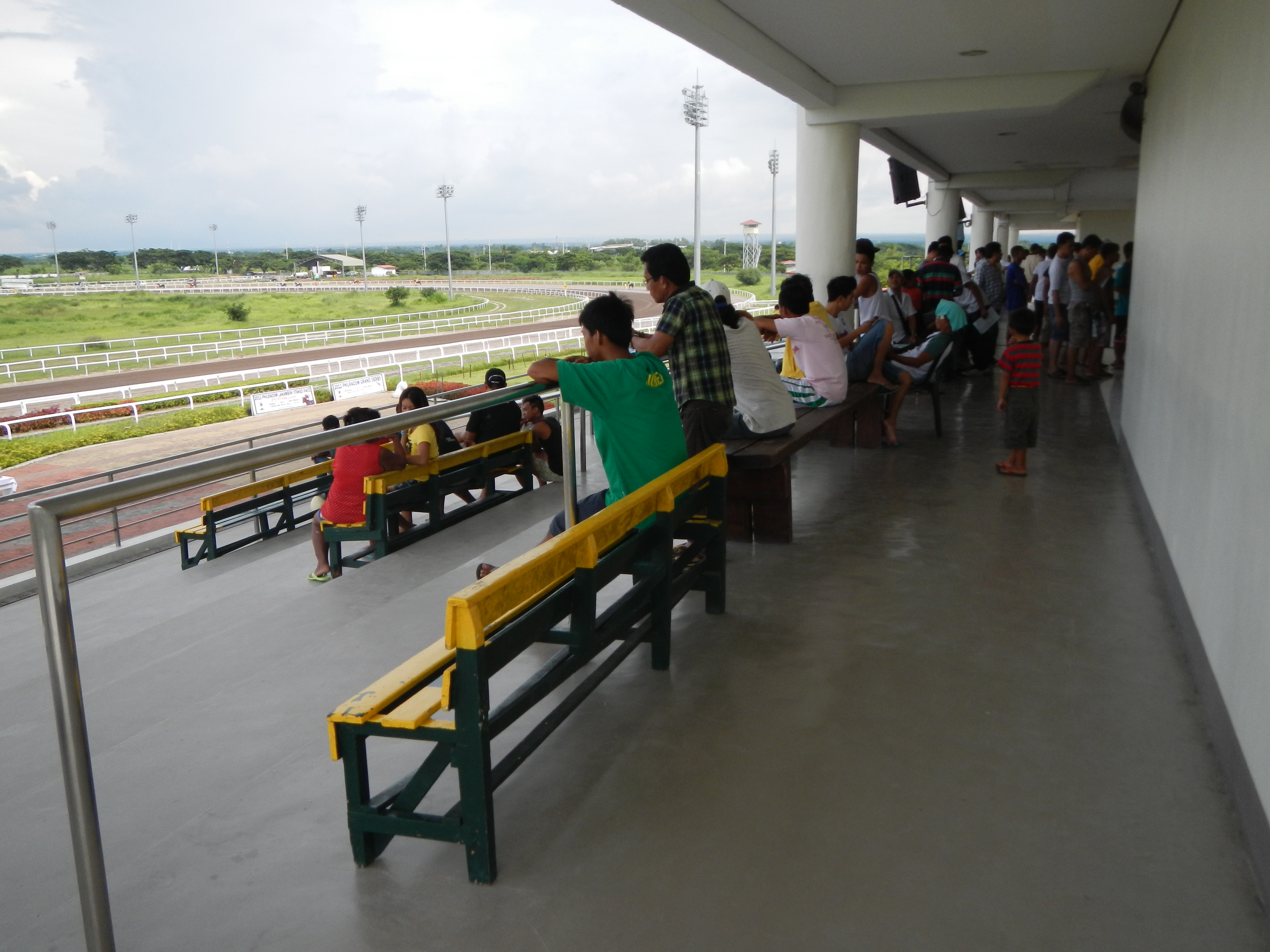
Spectators at the Saddle & Clubs Leisure Park (Santa Ana Park) Race Track at Sabang, Naic, Cavite, Philippines (July 2013).

==== 1940s ====
In March 1946, the horseracing facilities of MJCI were returned to its members. It took two months of reconstruction before the racetrack became open to the public. In 1948, the Commission on Races was created by Republic Act. No. 309, a law signed by former Philippine President Elpidio Quirino to regulate the horseracing sector.

==== 1950s ====
In 1951, President Quirino further signed Executive Order No. 392, a presidential order that resulted in the creation of the Games and Amusements Board, which was given the responsibility to regulate public gaming. The Board was also tasked with enforcing gambling laws.

In 1957, after the MJCI was registered at the Manila Stock Exchange, off-track betting stations were established in Manila, Pampanga, Cavite, and other provinces with the aim of eradicating illegal bookmakers. Horseraces at the club were broadcast on television via VHF Channel 11.

==== 1960s ====
In 1964, the Philippines became the host of the Fourth Asian Racing Conference. In 1965, the National Stud Farm was created, through former Philippine President Ferdinand Marcos's approval of Republic Act No. 4618. There were three main purposes for the National Stud Farm. First was to prevent the illegal importation of foreign breeds of horses. Second was to improve the existing breeds of Philippine horses. Third was to perform other functions related to horseracing. In 1969, regulation of the "distribution of gross wages sales on horseracing" was started through the approval of Republic Act No. 6115. During the 1960s, the Philippines became a member of the Asian Racing Conference (ARC), which focused on how further to improve horseracing in the region.

==== 1970s ====
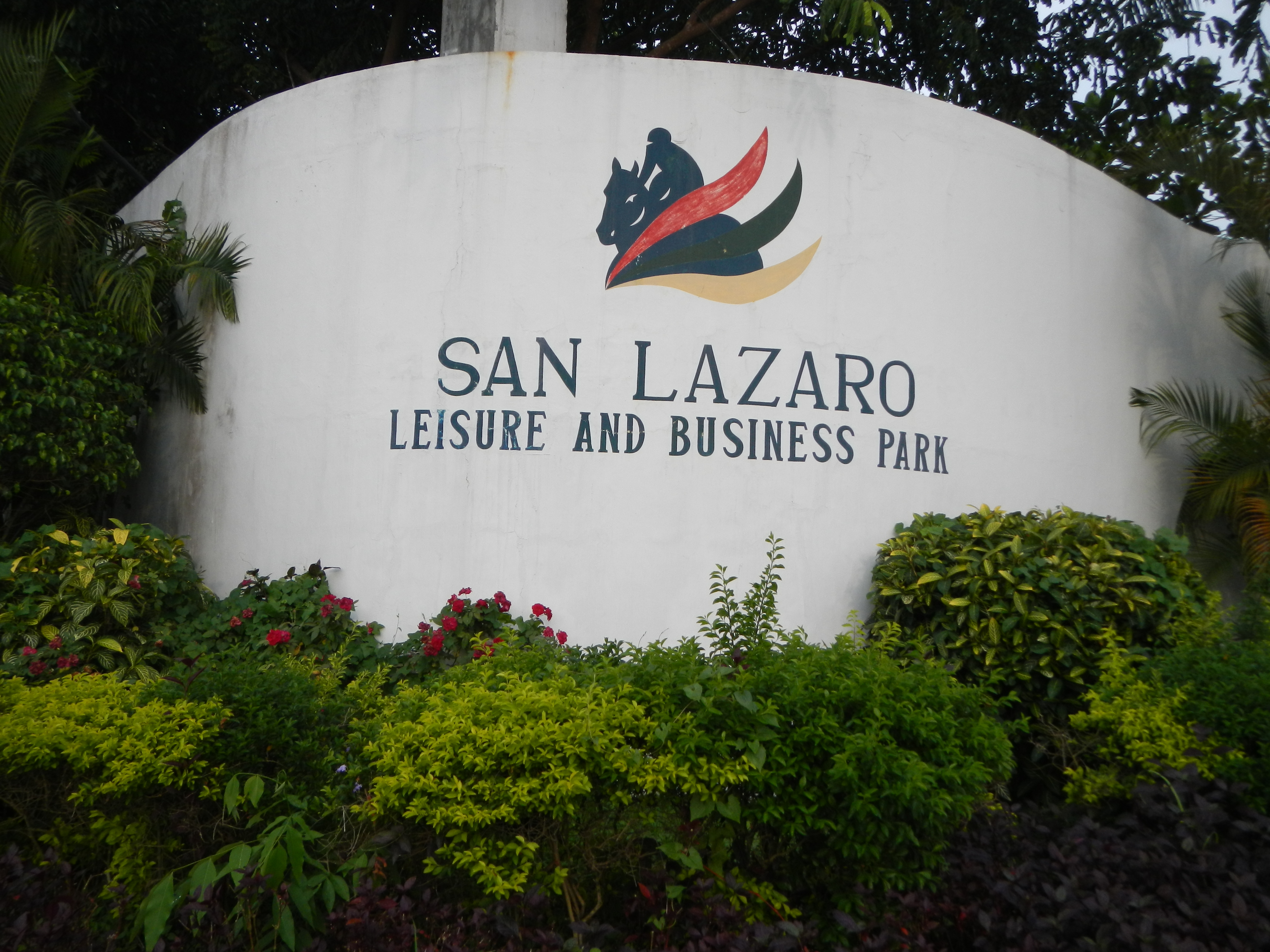
Sign of the MJCI's San Lazaro Leisure & Business Park at Lantic, Carmona, Cavite in the Philippines (June 2013).

In 1971, the MJC's Gran Copa trophy was lost in a fire. Today only a replica exists at the San Lazaro Leisure Park (SLLP). Despite the loss, the Gran Copa de Manila horseracing event continued during the 1970s. With San Miguel Beer as the sponsor, two divisions of the Gran Copa de Manila were being held. The event also became known as the San Miguel Beer Copa or SMB Copa due to SMB sponsorship. (Note: SMB's sponsorship would stop at the end of the 1990s when a competitor became the primary sponsor.)

In 1972, both the MJCI and the PRC were given franchises to "construct, operate and maintain their own racetracks for a period of 25 years". This was made into law by the Philippine Congress with Republic Acts No. 6631 and 6632.

In 1974, the twelfth Asian Racing Conference was held in the Philippines. Also during 1974, the Philippine Racing Commission (PHILRACOM) was created through Presidential Decree No. 420. PHILRACOM was given the responsibility to promote and administer the development of horseracing in the Philippines as "a sport and a source of revenue and employment". The PHILRACOM was established through the efforts of the Metropolitan Association of Race Horse Owners (MARHO), an organization formed when a shortage in the supply of horsefeed, such as oats, occurred. On March 20, 1974, the two entities sharing authority over horseracing were the Philippine Racing Commission and the Games and Amusements Board (GAB).

As of June 3, 1977, through Presidential Decree No. 1157, the rate of taxes from horseracing (together with Jai-alai) was equivalent to 10% of an individual's Sweepstakes winnings or dividends corresponding to each winning ticket, after deducting the cost of the ticket.

==== 1980s ====
In 1988, Executive Order No. 194 reduced the level of horseracing taxes. This lowering of tax rates happened through the efforts of MARHO, which was headed at the time by Federico "Eric" Moreno, a Philippine justice.

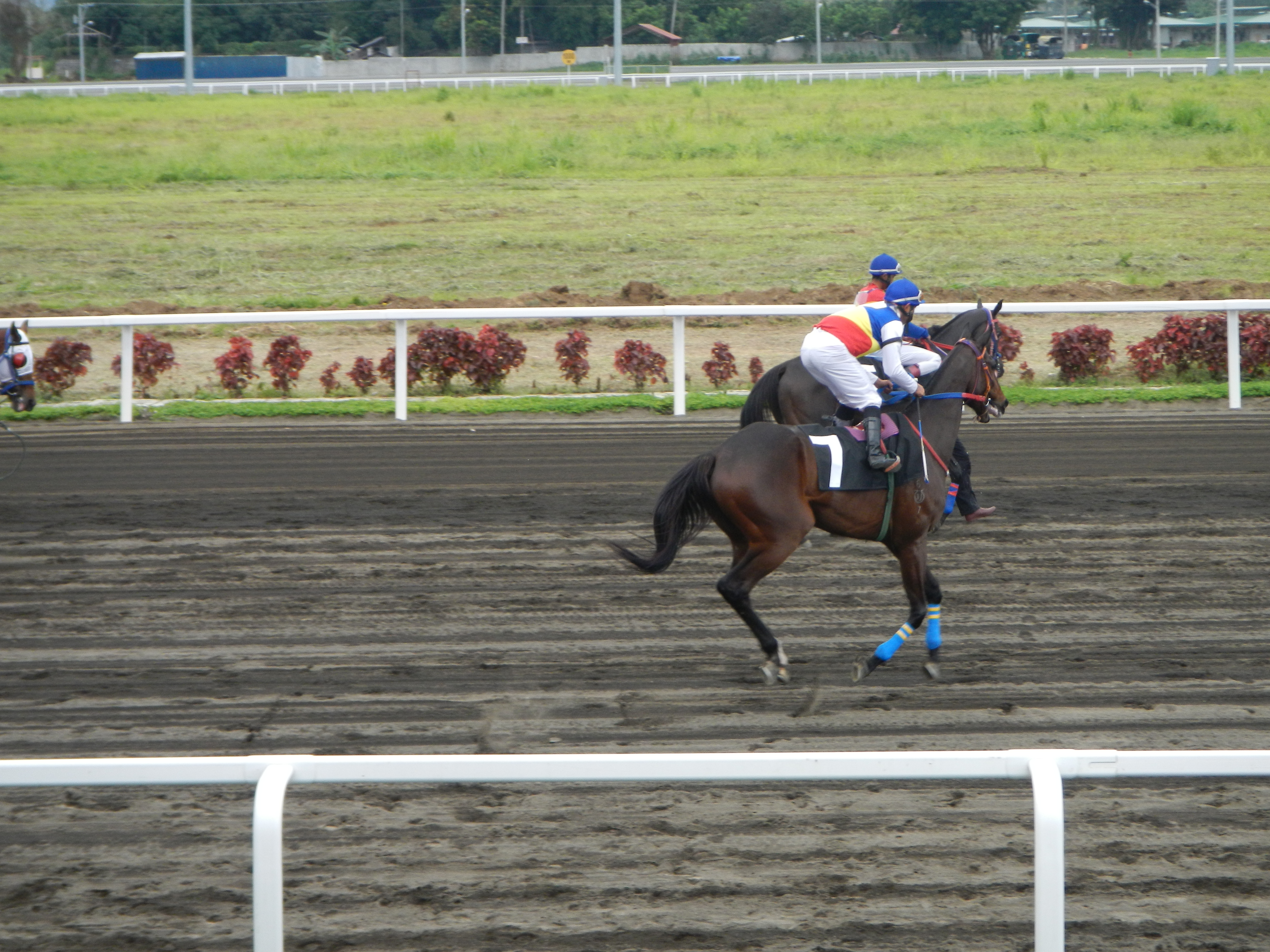
A horserace at the Metro Manila Turf Club Race Track in Batangas, Philippines on July 14, 2013.

==== 1990s ====
During the early part of the 1990s, computer technology was employed for the day-to-day operations of the MJCI.

In 1992, a program to monitor Equine Infectious Anemia (EIA) was initiated by the National Stud Farm for all breeding stock. The tests adopted were the Coggins Test (also known as the Agar Gel Immuno-Diffusion (AGID) Test). In 1995, the Blood Typing and Parentage Validation Program was also adopted by the NSF for horses that were under contract with the Royal Western India Turf Club, Inc. (RWITC). In 1996, the Stud Book Authority of the Philippines (SBAP, also known as The Philippine Stud Book Volume I) was recognized by the International Stud Book Committee (ISBC). The Stud Book Authority of the Philippines recorded the "breeding activities of more than 500 Thoroughbred mares" (including those that were breeding in the Philippines) from 1994.

In 1996, the yearly MARHO Breeders Cup (MBC) program was established by MARHO leader, horseowner, and horsebreeder Aristeo "Putch" Puyat, together with Leonardo "Sandy" Javier, Jr., Puyat co-leader at MARHO. The program gives recognition and trophies to deserving horse owners, horse breeders, jockeys, and trainers, focused only on "high-quality stock" of Philippine-bred horses.

In November and December 1997 an outbreak of equine influenza affected horseracing in the Philippines.

In 1999, the second volume of the Stud Book Authority of the Philippines known as The Philippine Stud Book Volume II was published, a record of the "breeding activities of more than 600 Thoroughbred mares" in the country from 1995 through 1998, including stallions which have produced offspring from pregnant (in-foal) mares imported into the Philippines during that time.

Live horseraces at the MJCI were later broadcast on a dedicated cable television channel.

==== 2000s ====
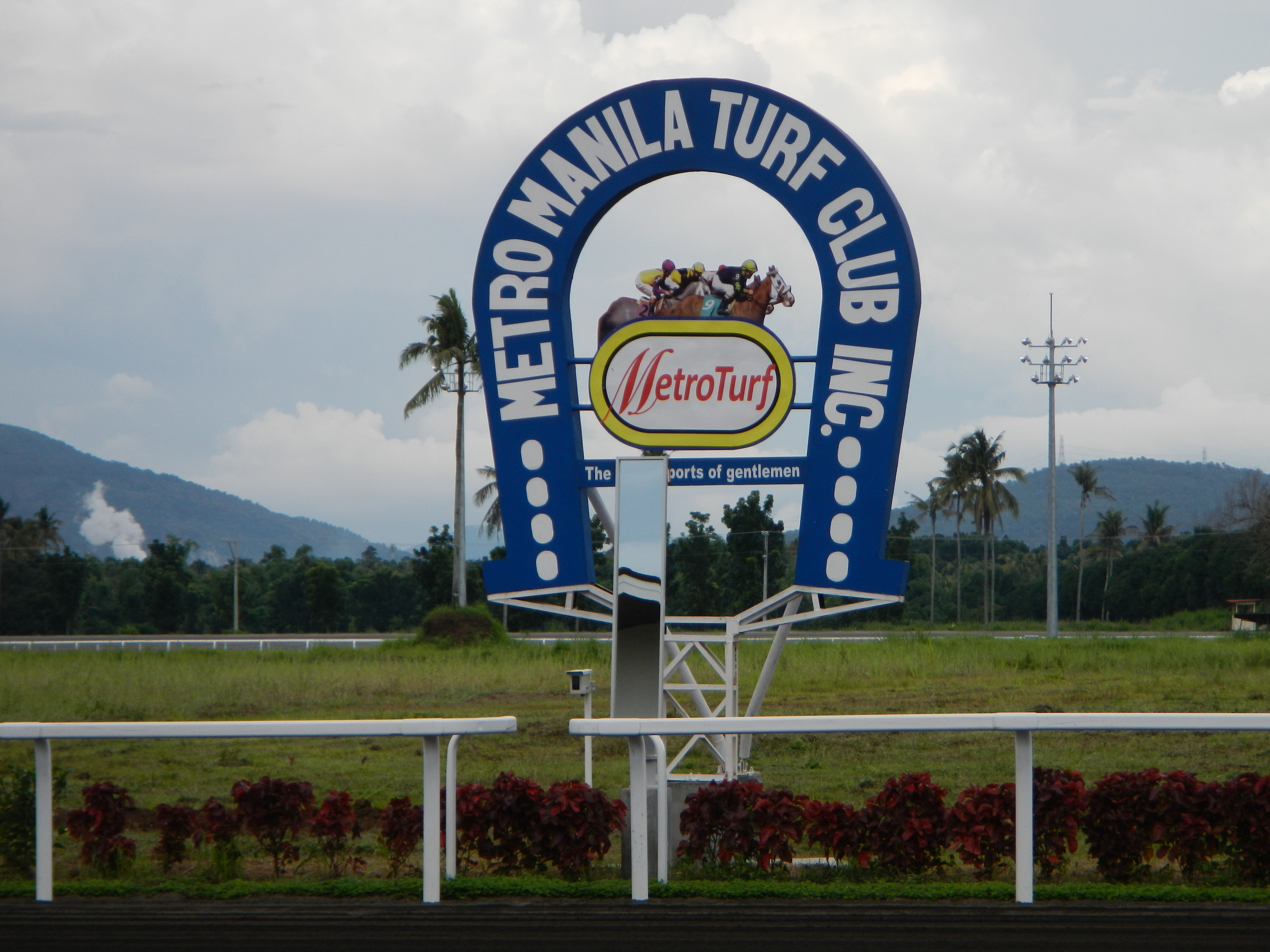
A sign at the Metro Manila Turf Club Race Track in Malvar and Tanauan City, Batangas, Philippines. This horseracing club opened in February 2013.

In 2000, Executive Order No. 296 was signed by Philippine President Joseph Estrada to integrate the "personnel, programs and resources" of the National Stud Farm with other units and agencies managed by the Department of Agriculture. With this Order the Stud Book Division became the Stud Book and Animal Registry Division (SBARD), placing it under the control of the Bureau and Animal Industry (BAI). With the same Order, the Stud Book Division became the Stud Book Authority of the Philippines (SBAP).

In 2001, three Japanese-owned thoroughbred horses bred in the Philippines were exported to Japan, and were proven to be of horseracing quality "at par" with racehorses bred in other countries. All of them were sired by Heza Gone West and was bred by Manuel G. Viray, their names were Spectre, Regal Western, and Ira's Dream.

In 2003, the Philippine National Stud Book Division was transferred from the Department of Agriculture to the Philippine Racing Commission, a bureau that was directly under the control of the Office of the President of the Philippines. The executive order was approved by Philippine President Gloria Macapagal Arroyo. Also in 2003, the offices and racetrack of the MJCI were transferred to Carmona, Cavite at the San Lazaro Leisure Park (SLLP), a 77-hectare (190-acre) complex.

In 2004, after the start of the transfer of personnel, programs, and other resources of the Stud Book Division to the Philippine Racing Commission, The Philippine Stud Book Volume III was published, recording the breeding activities of 676 Thoroughbred mares from 1999 until 2002. Also in 2004, the first MARHO Founders Cup (also known as the "Pearl Stakes") horseracing festival was started by the founders of MARHO to celebrate the organization's foundation.

In 2005, Benhur C. Abalos became the leader of MARHO. Abalos and other members of MARHO took legal and police action against the activities of illegal bookmakers. The campaign would continue through 2006. Also in 2005, monitoring and eradication program for Equine Infectious Anemia (EIA) was made mandatory by PHILRACOM for all racehorses. Identification "passports" were also issued for all racehorses, including pedigrees, vaccination, laboratory test results, and other required information.

Also during 2005 the MJCI developed a website featuring horseraces, tips, and results. In 2006, MJCI became the first horse racing club in the Philippines to provide horse racing information through text messaging, a program known as the Karera Info sa Text, with plans to introduce betting via text message.

Also in 2006, the Blood Typing and Parentage Validation Program for racehorses was replaced by a DNA technology program. A microchip numbering program was additionally adopted in 2007 for foals that were born in 2005. Also in 2006, because of the International Agreement on Breeding, Racing and Wagering (IABRW), the Philippines became a signatory to significant articles published by International Federation of Horseracing Authorities (IFHA) in relation to racehorse breeding. On December 8, 2006, the San Lazaro Leisure Park Turf Club of the MJCI became the first "racino" (Note: A portmanteau of "racing" and "casino". The concept started in the United States during the end of the 1990s.) in Asia. The casino gaming area, named as the Casino Filipino at San Lazaro, was on the top floor of the SLLP Turf Club.

In 2008, the offices and Santa Ana racetrack of PRCI were transferred from Makati to the newly built Saddle and Clubs Leisure Park in Naic, Cavite.

==== 2010s ====
In February 2013, the Metro Manila Turf Club, Inc. (also known as Metro Turf or MMTCI) opened, being the third world-class horse racing facility in the country. It operates at Malvar, Batangas.

Until the end of 2012, races were conducted every other Tuesdays to Sundays. The race venues were alternatively shuttled between PRCI and MJCI. With the entry of MMTCI in 2013, the racing calendar has been divided among the three racetracks; racing days are alternating held so that only one track operates in each racing day.

In November 2018, MMTCI wrote Philracom that they were considering suspending operations for the first quarter of 2019, citing financial losses among other reasons. A group of concerned horse owners approached the club's management and offered to run the racetrack themselves. This group of 'white knights', which calls itself the "New Management Board", is headed by former Mandaluyong mayor Atty. Benjamin C. Abalos Jr. and Atty. Narciso O. Morales. They began operating MMTCI in January 2019, with their first race meet a success in terms of gross sales.

==== 2020s ====
Affected by the COVID-19 pandemic in the Philippines beginning 2020, horse racing soldiered on.

In August 2022, Manila Jockey Club and the San Lazaro Leisure Park officially shut down its 155-year-old horse racing operations with the last races under its banners in October, disclosing the two "would focus on real estate ventures while leasing existing properties." The Philippine Racing Club-Saddle and Clubs Leisure Park also announced that "it will drop its horseracing business in November as it focuses on real estate development".

Both the PRCI and MJCI begun the transition period to new operators to continue the traditions they started. Beginning November, 2022, given these circumstances, Metro Manila Turf Club took on a de facto monopoly mode on horse races and race betting, pending the arrival of the new competitors operating in Cavite and Batangas, one of them being Hapi Jockey Club, Inc. of The Horsemen's Track, which is constructing a new race track in Padre Garcia, Batangas, giving the province two top quality tracks and breaking the long hold Metroturf had on the province. Manila Jockey Club leased its horse racing facilities in Carmona, Cavite to HJCI as it began operations that year.

During the running of the fourth race at Metro Turf Club in Malvar, Batangas on January 10, 2024, 46-year-old jockey Francisco "Kiko" A. Tuazon's (of Barangay 331, Manila) left stirrup of his horse No. 5 named "Wild Eagle" owned by James Rabano suddenly broke, caused him to lose his footing, and fell on the race track at 6:48 p.m from his horse. Tuazon was trampled by his horse and another steed. Suffering from a concussion, he was taken to Daniel Mercado Medical Center in Tanauan, Batangas where he was declared dead by Dr. Benjamin Macatangay. Philippine Racing Commission chairman Aurelio "Reli" P. De Leon Aurelio de Leon paid tribute to the fallen jockey in a statement: "The Commission, along with the entire horse racing community, deeply mourns the untimely passing of jockey Francisco 'Kiko' Tuazon. A revered and cherished figure in the sport, he left an indelible mark on the track and in our hearts." This incident was the first ever major death in the sport in years.

The P12 million biggest purse in Philippine horse racing history (2024 Philracom-PCSO 52nd "Presidential Gold Cup Race") was claimed by veteran horse owner Benhur Abalos' longshot entry "Batang Manda".

With the opening of The Horsemen's Track in November 2025, Philippine horse racing returned to a duopoly model with alternating race days in Tanauan-Malvar and Padre Garcia, both in Batangas province.

In 2025, the Presidential Gold Cup was elevated into the country's first-ever Domestic Group 1 race with a prize money of 15 million pesos. It was won by Don Julio.

== Organizations ==
- Philippine Charity Sweepstakes Office
- Philippine Racing Commission
- Metropolitan Association of Race Horse (MARHO)
- Philippine Thoroughbred Owners and Breeders' Organization (PHILTOBO)
- Klub Don Juan de Manila

== Tournaments ==
- PCSO Presidential Gold Cup (est. 1973)
- PCSO Silver Cup (est. 1995)
- Triple Crown Series (est. 1978)

== Venues ==
Venue	Location	Closed
San Lazaro Hippodrome	Manila	2002
Santa Ana Race Park	Makati, Metro Manila	2008
Saddle and Clubs Leisure Park	Naic, Cavite	2022
San Lazaro Leisure Park	Carmona, Cavite	2022
Metro Manila Turf Club	Malvar, Batangas	Active
The Horsemen's Track	Padre Garcia, Batangas	Active

== See also ==
- Horse breeds (breeds of horses)
- Horse breeding
- Horse breeds by country of origin
