= PCSO Silver Cup =

Silver Cup
- Class: G1
- Location: MetroTurf Racecourse; Malvar, Batangas, Philippines (since 2022) & The Horsemen's Track; Padre Garcia, Batangas, Philippines (since 2026)
- Inaugurated: April 23, 1995; 31 years ago
- Race type: Thoroughbred
- Sponsor: Philippine Charity Sweepstakes Office

Race information
- Qualification: Fillies/mares (1995–1996); Open, locally-bred (1997–present)
- Weight: Handicap
- Purse: ₱4,000,000 (2026): 1st: ₱2,400,000; 2nd: ₱900,000; 3rd: ₱500,000; 4th: ₱200,000

The Silver Cup (branded as PCSO Silver Cup for sponsorship reasons), formerly known as the First Lady/First Gentleman Silver Cup, is a Domestic Group 1 horse race in the Philippines. It is positioned as a counterpart race to the Presidential Gold Cup.

== History ==
The Philippine Charity Sweepstakes Office (PCSO) first organized the Silver Cup as the First Lady (FL) Silver Cup as a horse race exclusive to fillies and mares and in honor of the First Lady of the Philippines. The first edition was held on April 23, 1995 at the Santa Ana Race Park in Makati. The race was won by bay filly Pay D' Clay of Augusto Santos, former Philippine Racing Commission (Philracom) chairman. The race was also initially linked to PCSO's Mega Draws.

In 1997, the FL Silver Cup was made an open tournament for locally-bred horses with handicapping imposed. The race was not held in 1999, with the fifth edition taking part in 2000.

In 2001, the tournament became the First Gentleman (FG) Silver Cup in honor of the First Gentleman of the Philippines.

Since 2011, the race has only been known simply as the Silver Cup due to the absence of a First Lady or First Gentleman following President Benigno Aquino III's election in 2010.

As of 2026, the Silver Cup has been elevated to Domestic Group I with the prize money of ₱4,000,000.

== Venues ==
Venue	Location	Closed
San Lazaro Hippodrome	Manila	2002
Santa Ana Park	Makati, Metro Manila	2008
Santa Ana Park	Naic, Cavite	2022
San Lazaro Leisure Park	Carmona, Cavite	2022
MetroTurf Racecourse	Malvar, Batangas	Active
The Horsemen's Track	Padre Garcia, Batangas	Active

== Winners ==
Key
Venues	Names
Metro Manila Turf Club (since 2013) (Malvar-Tanauan City, Batangas); San Lazaro Hippodrome (1900 - 1942, 1946 - 2003) (Sta. Cruz, Manila); San Lazaro Leisure Park (2003 - 2022) (Carmona City, Cavite); Santa Ana Park (2009 - 2022) (Naic); Santa Ana Park (1937 - 1942, 1946 - 2009) (Makati); The Horsemen's Track (since 2025) (Padre Garcia)	PCSO First Lady Silver Cup (1995–2000); PCSO First Gentleman Silver Cup (2001–2010); PCSO Silver Cup (2011–present)

PCSO Silver Cup winners
Year	Venue	Winner	Jockey	Owner	Time	Ref.
1995	Santa Ana Park, Makati	Pay D' Clay	Joe Noel Camu	Augusto Santos	—N/a	
1996	Santa Ana Park, Makati	American Song	Dominador Borbe Jr.	Rodolfo Mendoza	—N/a	
1997	San Lazaro Hippodrome, Sta. Cruz, Manila	Wise Guy	Patricio Dilema	Maria Consuelo Puyat-Reyes	—N/a	
1998	Santa Ana Park, Makati	Streets of Gold	Miguel Recosana	Mario Mercader	—N/a	
1999	Not held					
2000	Santa Ana Park, Makati	Streets of Gold	Patricio Dilema	Mario Mercader	2:13.6	
2001	San Lazaro Hippodrome, Sta. Cruz, Manila	Wind Blown	Fernando Raquel Jr.	Hermie Esguerra	2:06.5	
2002	Santa Ana Park, Makati	Wind Blown	Fernando Raquel Jr.	Hermie Esguerra	—N/a	
2003	Santa Ana Park, Makati	Golden Ballet	JB Hernandez	Jun Almeda	2:11	
2004	San Lazaro Leisure & Business Park, Carmona, Cavite	Red Star Rising	Manolito F. Daquis	Michael Trillana	—N/a	
2005	Santa Ana Park, Makati	Cover Girl	JB Hernandez	C&H Enterprises	—N/a	
2006	San Lazaro Leisure & Business Park, Carmona, Cavite	Real Spicy	Louie Balboa	Hermie Esguerra	—N/a	
2007	Santa Ana Park, Makati	Empire King	Jeffrey Ladiana	David C. Lee	—N/a	
2008	San Lazaro Leisure & Business Park, Carmona, Cavite	Real Spicy	Jeffril Zarate	Hermie Esguerra	—N/a	
2009	Santa Ana Park, Naic, Cavite	Don Enrico	Fernando Raquel Jr.	Lorraine Uy Wi, Gerardo Espina Jr.	—N/a	
2010	San Lazaro Leisure & Business Park, Carmona, Cavite	Ibarra	Jesse Guce	Benhur Abalos	—N/a	
2011	Santa Ana Park, Naic, Cavite	Yes Pogi	Manolito Daquis	Francis Lim	—N/a	
2012	San Lazaro Leisure & Business Park, Carmona, Cavite	Magna Carta	Jesse Guce	Michael Dragon Javier	—N/a	
2013	Santa Ana Park, Naic, Cavite	Hagdang Bato	JB Hernandez	Benhur Abalos	—N/a	
2014	Santa Ana Park, Naic, Cavite	Pugad Lawin	Jesse Guce	Antonio Tan	—N/a	
2015	Metro Manila Turf Club, Malvar-Tanauan, Batangas	Skyway	Virgilio Camañero Jr.	Deemark International	2:05.4	
2016	Santa Ana Park, Naic, Cavite	Low Profile	Mark Alvarez	Ruben Dimacuha	2:05	
2017	San Lazaro Leisure & Business Park, Carmona, Cavite	Radio Active	John Alvin Guce	Oliver Velasquez	—N/a	
2018	Metro Manila Turf Club, Malvar-Tanauan, Batangas	Dixie Gold	Oneal Cortez	Joseph Dyhengco	2:05.4	
2019	No information					
2020	No information					
2021	San Lazaro Leisure & Business Park, Carmona, Cavite	Super Swerte	Andreu Villegas	Sandy Javier	1:50.6	
2022	Metro Manila Turf Club, Malvar-Tanauan, Batangas	Boss Emong	Jeffril Zarate	Kennedy Morales	1:51	
2023	Metro Manila Turf Club, Malvar-Tanauan, Batangas	Boss Emong	Dan Camañero	Kennedy Morales	1:51.6	
2024	Metro Manila Turf Club, Malvar-Tanauan, Batangas	Easy Does It	Jomer Estorque	—N/a	1:53.6	
2025	Metro Manila Turf Club, Malvar-Tanauan, Batangas	Jungkook	Mark Angelo Alvarez	Tisha Sevilla	1:50.8	
2026	The Horsemen's Track, Philippine Jockey Club, Padre Garcia, Batangas	Circus Crowd	JL Lazaro	Bianca Sevilla	1:49.5	

== See also ==
- Philracom Triple Crown
- PCSO Presidential Gold Cup
