= PCSO Presidential Gold Cup =

- Class: Group I
- Location: MetroTurf Racecourse; Malvar, Batangas, Philippines (since 2017), Philippine Jockey Club; Padre Garcia, Batangas, Philippines (since 2025)
- Inaugurated: 1973; 53 years ago
- Race type: Thoroughbred
- Sponsor: Philippine Charity Sweepstakes Office

Race information
- Distance: 2,000 meters, • Metro Manila Turf Club, Inc., Malvar-Tanauan City, Batangas (since 2013) • Philippine Jockey Club, Padre Garcia, Batangas (since 2025) • San Lazaro Leisure & Business Park, Carmona City, Cavite (2003-2022) • Santa Ana Park, Naic, Cavite (2009-2022). 2,045 meters        • San Lazaro Hippodrome, Sta. Cruz, Manila (1900, 1912-1942, 1946-2003) 2,050 meters • Santa Ana Park, Makati City (1937-2009)
- Surface: Dirt
- Track: Left-handed
- Weight: Handicap
- Purse: ₱15,000,000 (2025)

The Presidential Gold Cup (branded as PCSO Presidential Gold Cup for sponsorship reasons) is a Domestic Group 1 flat horse race in the Philippines. It was established in 1973.

== Background ==
The Presidential Gold Cup was established with the support of the Philippine Charity Sweepstakes Office (PCSO) under the then-chairman Nereo Andolong. It was named after the role of the President, the chief executive of the Philippines. It is also supported by the Philippine Racing Commission (Philracom).

The Gold Cup was initially held at the San Lazaro Hippodrome of the Manila Jockey Club from 1973 to 1978.

From 1979 to 1987, the Philracom took over the organization of the PGC before the PCSO resumed conducting the race.

In 2025, the Gold Cup was elevated into a Domestic Group 1 race with a prize money of 15 million pesos.

== Venues ==
Venue	Location	Closed
San Lazaro Hippodrome	Manila	2002
Santa Ana Park	Makati, Metro Manila	2008
Santa Ana Park	Naic, Cavite	2022
San Lazaro Leisure Park	Carmona, Cavite	2022
MetroTurf Racecourse	Malvar, Batangas	Active
Philippine Jockey Club	Padre Garcia, Batangas	Active

== Winners ==
Year	Venue	Winner	Jockey	Owner	Time	Ref.
1973	SLH	Sun God	Elias Ordiales	Pedro Cojuangco	—N/a	
1974	SLH	Ilocos King	Crescencio	Constante Rubio	2:17	
1975	SLH	Henna's Gold	Camba	Domingo Poblete	—N/a	
1976	SLH	Fiorella	Jesus Guce	Gretchen Cojuangco	—N/a	
1977	SLH	Little Morning	Andres Camba	Yulo family	—N/a	
1978	SLH	Gypsy Grey	Eduardo Domingo Jr.	Yulo family	—N/a	
1979		Honor Roll	Francisco Fernando	Peping Cojuangco	—N/a	
1980		Red Annie	Jesus Guce	Nicanor Jacinto III	—N/a	
1981		Fair and Square	Jesus Guce	Cesar and Herminia Mamon	—N/a	
1982		Fair and Square	Jesus Guce	Cesar and Herminia Mamon	—N/a	
1983		Skywalker	Elpidio Aguila	Henry Cojuangco	—N/a	
1984		Dino Bambino	Eduardo Domingo Jr.	Cadamma Enterprises	—N/a	
1985		Headmaster	Andres Camba	Caramel Investments	—N/a	
1986		Music Machine	Rizalito Agustin	Jenar Breeders Corp.	—N/a	
1987		Time Master	Eduardo Domingo Jr.	Cadamma Enterprises	—N/a	
1988		Thriller	Gerardo Biazon	Andrew Sanchez	—N/a	
1989		Sun Dancer	Eduardo Domingo Jr.	Toshio Abe	—N/a	
1990		Sun Dancer	Eduardo Domingo Jr.	Toshio Abe	—N/a	
1991		Balatkayo	Joe Noel Camu	RHU Corporation	—N/a	
1992		Grand Party	Guarino Infantado	Andrew Sanchez	—N/a	
1993		Fair Start	Elpidio Aguila	C&H Enterprises	—N/a	
1994		Crown Colony	Antonio Alcasid Jr.	Romen Equity Corp.	—N/a	
1995		Strong Material	Jesus Guce	Rolando Rojas	—N/a	
1996		Bulldozer	Joe Noel Camu	Chito Arceo	—N/a	
1997		Bulldozer	Joe Noel Camu	Katkarian Inc.	—N/a	
1998		Real Top	Jesus Guce	Emmanuel King	—N/a	
1999		Hobby	Ramon Guce	Jose Vergel de Dios	—N/a	
2000		Wind Blown	Dominador Borbe Jr.	Sandy Javier	—N/a	
2001		Wind Blown	Patricio Dilema	Hermie Esguerra	2:13.5	
2002		Free Wind	Joe Noel Camu	Robert Liong	—N/a	
2003	SLLP	Red Star Rising	Manolito Daquis	Michael Trillana	2:07	
2004		Empire King	Jeffrey Ladiana	David Lee	—N/a	
2005		Speed Advantage	Fernando Raquel, Jr.	Roberto Yutadco	02:05	
2006		Real Spicy	Jesse Guce	Hermie Esguerra	2:09	
2007		Native Land	Jesse Guce	Antonio Tan Jr.	02:07	
2008		Ibarra	Kelvin Abobo	Benhur Abalos	02:09	
2009		Don Enrico	Fernando Raquel Jr.	Lorraine Uy Wi and Gerardo Espina Jr.	—N/a	
2010	SAP (C)	Yes Pogi	Manolito Daquis	Francis Lim	—N/a	
2011	SLLP	Magna Carta	Jesse Guce	Michael Javier	2:07	
2012	SAP (C)	Hagdang Bato	JB Hernandez	Benhur Abalos	2:09	
2013	SLLP	Pugad Lawin	Patricio Dilema	Antonio Tan Jr.	—N/a	
2014	SLLP	Hagdang Bato	JB Hernandez	Benhur Abalos	2:06	
2015	SLLP	Dixie Gold	Patricio Dilema	Joey Dyhengco	2:08	
2016	SLLP	Low Profile	—N/a	—N/a	02:07	
2017	MT	Dewey Boulevard	Patricio Dilema	Hermie Esguerra	2:05	
2018	SLLP	Sepfourteen	John Alvin Guce	SC Stockfarm Inc.	02:08	
2019	SLLP	Super Sonic	JB Guce	Sandy Javier	—N/a	
2020	SLLP	Pangalusian Island	Mark Alvarez	—N/a	2:08.8	
2021	MT	Nuclear Bomb (Note: Originally won by Sky Shot which was later disqualified due to foul riding by its jockey FM Racquel Jr. . Nuclear Bomb was later promoted as winner)	—N/a	—N/a	—N/a	
2022	MT	Big Lagoon	—N/a	—N/a	2:04	
2023	MT	Big Lagoon	John Alvin Guce	—N/a	2:05	
2024	MT	Batang Manda	Patricio Dilema	Benhur Abalos	2:06	
2025	PJC	Don Julio	Apoy Asuncion	Felizardo R. Sevilla Jr.	2:03	

== See also ==
- Philracom Triple Crown
- PCSO Silver Cup
