= Lucency =

American racehorse (born 2020)

- Sire: Tapwrit
- Grandsire: Tapit
- Dam: Crowning Affair
- Damsire: Giants Causeway
- Sex: Stallion
- Foaled: March 24, 2020 (age 6)
- Country: United States
- Color: Chestnut
- Breeder: Whisper Hill Farm LLC
- Owner: Southwest Racing Stables, Inc. and Triple V Racing LLC (Until 2025) Joseph C. Dyhengco (from 2025)
- Trainer: Dante I. Salazar
- Record: 31-15-5-1
- Earnings: US$299,730 & ₱5,405,000

Major wins
- Philracom-MHP Stakes Race III - G3; Imported-Local Challenge II - G3; 2nd Leg King's Cup; Amb. Danding Cojuangco Cup - G1

Lucency (foaled March 24, 2020) is an American-bred, Filipino-trained Thoroughbred racehorse known for winning the 2026 G1 Ambassador Danding Cojuangco Cup, making him the first imported horse to win a Philippine G1 horse race.

== Background ==
Lucency was born in the Whisper Hill Farm in 2020, his sire, Tapwrit, was a winner of the 2017 Belmont Stakes, and His damsire, Giants Causeway, was a 5-time Group 1 Winner.

He raced in the United States before being bought by Joseph Dyhengco and being sent to the Philippines.

== Racing career ==
=== USA: 2023-2025 ===
In the USA, he raced 18 times and won 6 times, placing second 3 times, and placing third once winning in tracks like the Aqueduct Racetrack, Churchill Downs, and Horseshoe Indianapolis.

=== Philippines - 2025: five year old season ===
In the Philippines, he is trained by Trainer Dante Salazar and is regularly ridden by Patricio Dilema.

In October 2025, he would make his first race in the Philippines at a 1600m race in the MetroTurf Racecourse, but would finish fourth behind Birchton, 12 days later he would gain his first victory in an 1800m stakes race at Malvar.

In November 14, he made his first race in Padre Garcia in the 2000m Ambassador Eduardo M. Cojuangco Jr. Memorial Cup Division 1, finishing second behind the horse Varatti, and in December 10, he got his second victory in the 1300m Race 6 of the day, setting the track record with a time of 1:14.60.

in December 28, he would run in the 2000m Group 3 Cool Summer Farm Imported Stakes, but would finish Fifth in a field of 5, the race would be won by the Singaporean Guineas winner Ace of Diamonds.

=== 2026: six year old season ===
In February 1, he would run in the 1650m Group 3 Japan Cup, finishing second behind the horse Tough Customer.

In March 1, he would win the 1650m Group 3 Imported-local Challenge II and in March 15 would win the Group 3 1650m Philracom-MHP Stakes Race III, winning over the second place, Tough Customer, by 13 lengths at a time of 1:38:48, which set the track record for the distance.

In April 26, he would run in the 1650m Crocodile Tape Imported Invitational, winning by 11 lengths over second place Andiamo A Firenze

His next race would be the 1650m Porsche Philippine Cup in June 21, which he would win 10 lengths over Pirate.

After almost a 2 months break, he would run in the second leg of the King's Cup in August 23, he would sit close to the leaders for most of the race before taking the lead at the final stretch, barely winning over Readytoriskitall.

He would run at the third leg of the King's Cup over 1800M in September 20, He would struggle for most of the race but would be able to contest for the lead near the final stretch before ultimately fading and finishing 7th, 10 lengths behind the winner Buzz Rocket，ending his winning streak.

In November 8, He would run in the inaugural running of the German-Philippine Cup, going back to 1650M, he would have the lead for the entire race and would win by 5 lengths over Resonant.

For the 2000m Ambassador Danding M. Cojuangco Jr. Cup, which has been promoted to G1, in November 22, he would be ridden by Jeffril Zarate for the race. Once again he would have the lead for most of the race, only being challenged by Speed Runner, however Speed Runner would fade in the final stretch and Lucency would win by about 1 length over Readytoriskitall.

== Pedigree ==
This pedigree table is taken from Pedigree Query

Pedigree of Lucency
Sire Tapwrit	Tapit	Pulpit	A.P. Indy
Sire Tapwrit	Tapit	Pulpit	Preach
Sire Tapwrit	Tapit	Tap Your Heels	Unbridled
Sire Tapwrit	Tapit	Tap Your Heels	Ruby Slippers
Sire Tapwrit	Appealing Zophie	Successful Appeal	Valid Appeal
Sire Tapwrit	Appealing Zophie	Successful Appeal	Successful Dancer
Sire Tapwrit	Appealing Zophie	Zophie	Hawkster
Sire Tapwrit	Appealing Zophie	Zophie	Sodeo Sodeo
Dam Crowning Affair	Giant's Causeway	Storm Cat	Storm Bird
Dam Crowning Affair	Giant's Causeway	Storm Cat	Terlingua
Dam Crowning Affair	Giant's Causeway	Mariah's Storm	Rahy
Dam Crowning Affair	Giant's Causeway	Mariah's Storm	Immense
Dam Crowning Affair	Capote's Crown	Capote	Seattle Slew
Dam Crowning Affair	Capote's Crown	Capote	Too Bald
Dam Crowning Affair	Capote's Crown	Majesty's Crown	Magesterial
Dam Crowning Affair	Capote's Crown	Majesty's Crown	Queen's Crown
