= SLLP =

SLLP may refer to:

- El Alto International Airport, for which the ICAO code is SLLP
- San Lazaro Leisure Park, a horse racing park in Carmona, Cavite in the Philippines
- Sri Lanka Labour Party, a political party in Sri Lanka
- Superficial layer LP in vocal folds
- Specialized language for linguistic programming
