= Patricio Dilema =

Personal information
- Full name: Patricio Ramos Dilema
- Nickname: Patty
- Nationality: Filipino
- Born: October 6, 1978 (age 47) Makati, Metro Manila, Philippines

Horse racing career
- Sport: Horse racing

Major racing wins
- PCSO Presidential Gold Cup (2001, 2013, 2015, 2017, 2024); PCSO Silver Cup (1997, 2000)

Honors
- PSA Jockey of the Year (2001, 2002, 2003, 2004, 2007)

Significant horses
- Wise Guy; Streets of Gold; Wind Blown; Pugad Lawin; Dixie Gold; Dewey Boulevard; Batang Manda

Patricio Ramos Dilema (born October 6, 1978) is a Filipino jockey who is a five-time Presidential Gold Cup winner.

== Early life and education ==
Patricio Dilema was born on October 6, 1978, in Makati, the son of jockey Eduardo Dilema and Alvira Ramos. He is one of eight siblings, with four older brothers and three sisters. He came from a racing family with his sibling eventually growing up to be involved in the discipline.

At 18, Dilema enrolled in the Philippines Jockeys Academy at Santa Ana Race Park, where he trained under American instructor George Stribling.

== Career ==
In 1995, Dilema made his competitive debut at Santa Ana aboard Regal Ace, finishing fourth. Later that same year, he earned his first win riding Lady Luigi, owned by Antonio Co, at the same Makati racecourse. He then had no notable placings until 1997. In that year he won the PCSO First Lady Silver Cup riding Wise Guy.

In the early 2000s, Dilema was collaborating with horseowner and breeder Hermie Esguerra leading to wins on the track.

The mare Streets of Gold won the 2000 PCSO Silver Cup which is also Dilema's second title for that tournament after winning it with Wise Guy three years ago.

At the 2001 Presidential Gold Cup, Patricio Dilema rode Wind Blown to win the title, earning the horse its second consecutive win following Dominador Borbe Jr., who had ridden the same horse to victory in the previous year

Dilema won the same competition with four other horses namely: Pugad Lawin (2013), Dixie Gold (2015), Dewey Boulevard (2017) and Batang Manda (2024).

He was also named Jockey of the Year in 2001, 2002, 2003, 2004, and 2007 at the PSA Annual Awards.

== Personal life ==
Patricio Dilema and Wella Chua married in June 2004 and had three children; a daughter and two sons. As of February 2025, Dilema is in a long-term relationship with Gracey Tamono Bermudez; the couple has two sons and a daughter.
