= MetroTurf Racecourse =

Philippine horse racing institution

Metroturf Racecourse

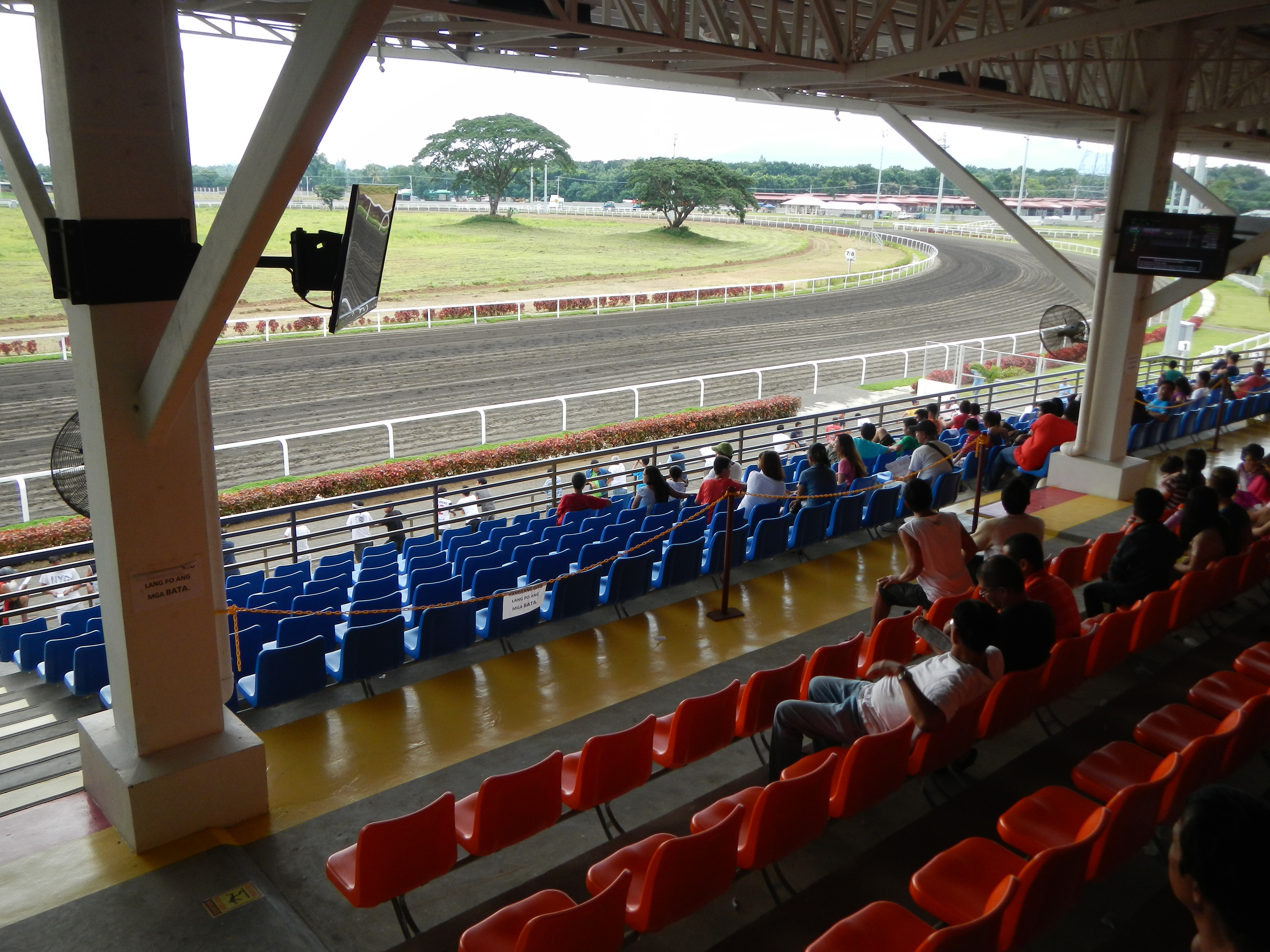
- Interactive map of Metroturf Racecourse
- Location: Malvar, Tanauan, Batangas, Philippines
- Coordinates: 14°03′42″N 121°09′37″E
- Owned by: Metro Manila Turf Club
- Date opened: February 19, 2013
- Screened on: Cignal (Nationwide); Cablelink and SkyCable (Metro Manila); MetroTurf TV's channel on YouTube
- Notable races: PCSO Presidential Gold Cup; PCSO Silver Cup

MetroTurf Racecourse is a horse racing venue in the Philippines. Located in Malvar and Tanauan, Batangas.

It is owned by the Metro Manila Turf Club (MMTC). MMTC was founded in 2013. Since 2022, it serves as the sole horse racing hub in the Philippines as the San Lazaro Leisure Park and the Santa Ana Park in Cavite has closed. It will be competing against the Philippine Jockey Club in the future.

== History ==
MMTCI began its operation in February 2013 by Dr. Norberto Quisumbing Jr., founder of the Norkis Group of Companies. It was built on a 45-hectare (450,000 m^{2}) racetrack located at the boundary of Malvar and Tanauan in Batangas. Quisumbing spent ₱1 billion in constructing the racetrack.

In 2021, MMTCI has allegedly collected twice the required 10% tax on horse racing bets, which resulted in an excessive ₱300 million. More than 60 horse trainers and groomers were signed a petition to the Games and Amusements Board (GAB) to suspend MMTCI's operations until the latter has settled unpaid taxes.

== Facilities ==
The racecourse was constructed by Singaporean racetrack consultant and builder K.K. Kumar. It has a 1,525-meter (5,003 ft) long track and a grandstand which can accommodate 3,000 people.
