= PCSO =

PCSO may refer to:

- Police community support officer, a police staff role in England and Wales
- Police custody and security officer, a police staff role in Scotland
- Pinellas County Sheriff's Office, a law enforcement agency in Florida
- Philippine Charity Sweepstakes Office, a government-controlled corporation for fundraising
