= Mica Javier =

Filipino singer and actress (born 1993)

- Born: Mica Cecille Javier; July 29, 1993 (age 33); Manila, Philippines
- Occupations: Singer; actress
- Years active: 2010–present
- Agent(s): Cornerstone Entertainment (2014–2016); Star Magic (2016–present)
- Spouse: Jay R (m. 2020)
- Relatives: Danny Javier (uncle)
- Musical career
- Origin: New York City
- Genres: OPM; Pop; R&B; Dance-pop
- Labels: HomeworkZ; Timbaland Productions
- Website: micajavier.com

Mica Cecille Javier-Sillona (born July 29, 1993) is a Filipino singer and actress.

== Early life ==
Javier was born in Manila, Philippines, the daughter of businessman and current Leyte Vice Governor Leonardo "Sandy" Javier Jr. Her paternal uncle is Danny Javier of the APO Hiking Society. Javier attended International School Manila (ISM) in Manila and is a 2006 alumna of the two-year NYU Liberal Studies Program (LS), formerly known as the General Studies Program (GSP), and a 2008 alumna of NYU's Gallatin School of Individualized Study.

== Career ==
Javier started as a commercial and print model while in high school in Manila. Signed under modeling agency Calcarries, she appeared in print ad campaigns for Colgate and Nestea. While at NYU, she modeled for Philippine editions of Women's Health, Cosmopolitan, and Preview, appeared in TV commercials for Whisper, Red Mobile, and Pizza Hut, and interned in marketing and PR for DVF, Adidas Originals, Harper's Bazaar, and Carol's Daughter.

While living in New York City, Javier was signed to modeling agencies BMG Models and MMG Models and appeared in Nolcha Fashion Week. In 2010, she was signed to Timbaland Productions, where her record "3000 Light Years" (produced by Dashawn "Happie" White & Davix Foreman of producing duo Grinehouse) was part of a 75-song deal between Timbaland Productions and Extreme Music Sony/ATV, which was licensed to Fox's hit TV show Glee and Lifetime's hit TV series Dance Moms.

In 2012, Javier moved back to Manila, where she was signed to Homeworkz, a record label owned by Filipino-American R&B singer, Jay R. Her first single, "Tonight", a duet with Jay R, was released in Manila in 2013, went No.1 on Urban Music radio station Wave 89.1 FM, and topped the Pinoy Myx Countdown and the Myx Hit Chart simultaneously. Her second single released in Manila, "Heart Song", also topped high end radio station charts on Monster RX 93.1, while the music video reached Top 10 on Myx Philippines' Pinoy Myx Countdown.

In March 2014, Mica received her first nomination for Favorite Urban Video at the Myx Music Awards. In June 2014, she was also nominated for five categories at the Wave 89.1 Urban Music Awards. Mica won two Urban Music Awards for Best New Artist, as well as Best Collaboration.

From 2016 to 2019, Mica was a member of all girl dance group GirlTrends (now known as GT) on Philippine variety show It's Showtime on ABS-CBN.

== Personal life ==
Javier married Filipino-American R&B singer-songwriter Jay-R on March 1, 2020, in Boracay, Philippines, after a courtship that started in 2012, when Jay R was 31 and Javier aged 19. [Note: Javier's age has been misreported by various Philippine media sources, who cited she was 8 years younger than her real age. This does not align with the dates that were provided previously in the Career section, unless she had started attending NYU at the age of 11.]

== Filmography ==
=== Film ===
Year	Title	Role
2016	Love Me Tomorrow	Mara
2017	Siargao	Karen
2018	Emty by Design	Katie
2019	General Commander	Maria Lopez
2022	Time Pirates	
2025	Songs for Selina	Selina
2026	The Last Hail M.A.R.Y	Mason Truman

=== Television ===
Year	Title	Role
2016	Maalaala Mo Kaya: Anino	Maritess' Sister
2016	It's Showtime	Herself / Performer (Girl Trend member)
2016–2021; 2026–present	ASAP	Herself / Co-host / Performer
2017	Maalaala Mo Kaya: Red Watch	Girlfriend #1
2017	Maalaala Mo Kaya: Salamin	Karen
2018	Maalaala Mo Kaya: Portrait	Alicia
2018	Maalaala Mo Kaya: Ukelele	MJ
2018	Maalaala Mo Kaya: Bantay bata	Rona
2018–2019	Precious Hearts Romances Presents: Los Bastardos	Lupita Bermudez-Cardinal
2019	Hush	Myra / Pam
2019	Magandang Buhay	Herself / Guest
2020	Ipaglaban Mo: Inaswang	Alma
2020	Tonight with Boy Abunda	Herself / Guest
2021	Huwag Kang Mangamba	young Deborah Delos Santos
2021	Init sa Magdamag	Paulina Vergara
2024	Family Feud	Herself / Player
2025	Disaster Strike Force	Natasha
2026	Eat Bulaga!	Herself / Guest
