= JB Hernandez =

Filipino racing jockey

Personal information
- Full name: Jonathan Basco Hernandez
- Nicknames: JB, Uno
- Nationality: Filipino

Horse racing career
- Sport: Horse racing

Major racing wins
- Presidential Gold Cup (2012, 2014); PCSO Silver Cup (2013)

Racing awards
- Philracom Triple Crown (2012)

Honors
- PSA Jockey of the Year (2006, 2007, 2013); Philracom Stakes Races Jockey of the Year (2020); Philracom Jockey of the Year (2015); Philracom Hall of Fame (2023)

Significant horses
- Hagdang Bato; Union Bell

Jonathan Basco "JB" Hernandez is a Filipino horse racing jockey.

== Career ==
Hailing from the province of Laguna, JB Hernandez started his jockey career in 1998, following the footsteps of his grandfather and father.

In 2012, Hernandez rode Hagdang Bato to a sweep of the Philracom Triple Crown, and later that year guided the horse to victory in the Presidential Gold Cup.

In 2013, with Hagdang Bato still ridden by Hernandez, the horse finished fourth in the Gold Cup after its start was hindered by a faulty starting gate. However, in the 2014 edition Hernandez guided the horse to its second Gold Cup victory. He also secured the Philracom Grand Championship aboard Malaya, further adding to his major stakes triumphs.

In 2019, Hernandez rode the two‑year‑old colt Union Bell, who won all six of his starts that season, five of which were stakes races.

In 2025, Hernandez expressed intention to retire in four years from horse racing.

== Earnings ==
In terms of earnings, Hernandez set impressive season records. In 2014, he led all jockeys in earnings, amassing ₱4.17 million million from 170 wins, 103 second‑place finishes, 86 third‑place finishes, and 61 fourth‑place finishes in 574 starts. Then, in 2016, he again topped the earnings chart with ₱4 million, earned through 162 wins, 94 second‑place finishes, 95 third‑place finishes, and 78 fourth‑place finishes across 584 starts.

== Honors and recognition ==
The PSA Annual Awards recognized him as Jockey of the Year in 2006, 2007, 2013, and 2026.

In 2015, the Philippine Racing Commission (Philracom) recognized Hernandez as the Best Jockey of the Year for 2014.

In 2020, Philracom named Hernandez the Stakes Races Jockey of the Year for his performance aboard Union Bell during the previous season.

In 2023, Hernandez was inducted to the Philracom Hall of Fame.
