= Wind Blown =

- Sire: Hazm
- Dam: Wind In My Hair
- Sex: Stallion
- Foaled: 1997 (age 28–29)
- Country: Philippines
- Color: Bay
- Breeder: Sandy Javier
- Owner: Sandy Javier (1997–2001); Herminio Esguerra (since 2001)
- Trainer: Nestor Manalang
- Jockey: Fernando Raquel Jr. Patricio Dilema
- Record: 49: 36–?–?
- Earnings: ₱19 million

Major wins
- Presidential Gold Cup (2000, 2001)

Honors
- 3x PSA Horse of the Year (2001, 2002, 2003)

Wind Blown is a Filipino Thoroughbred racehorse best known for winning the Presidential Gold Cup in both 2000 and 2001. He was retired to stud in 2003 after earning ₱19 million, which was the highest amount earned by a locally bred horse at the time.

== Background ==
Wind Blown, a bay colt by Hazm out of Wind In My Hair, was foaled in 1997 at Royal Maverick Farm of Sandy Javier in Rosario, Batangas. He traces back to noted stallion Northern Dancer.

He was purchased from Javier by Herminio Esguerra in 2001.

== Racing career ==
In 2000, Wind Blown under the ownership of Sandy Javier has already started racing winning eleven races in sixteen starts, four of which are stakes races. The horse won the Presidential Gold Cup in 2000 and 2001.

Wind Blown continued racing after his purchase by Esguerra.

He had his farewell race on December 7, 2003 at age six at the Santa Ana Race Park.

Wind Blown garnered ₱19 million by winning 36 career races, including 24 stakes crowns. He had a total of 49 starts. At the time of his retirement, it was the highest amount earned by a locally bred horse. He was also named the Horse of the Year at the PSA Annual Awards three times.

Fernando Raquel Jr. was the jockey which often rode Wind Blown. However, for his two Presidential Gold Cup wins, Dominador Borbe Jr. and Patricio Dilema were his riders in the 2000 and 2001 editions, respectively.

== Stud career ==
Wind Blown was retired to stud. By May 2005, the horse has already sired 20 offspring. Esguerra partnered with Pioneer Insurance to provide bonus money to Wind Blown's offspring who will win stakes races as incentives.

One notable progeny of his is Don Enrico, who won the Presidential Gold Cup in 2009.
