= Dixie Brass =

American-bred Thoroughbred racehorse

- Sire: Dixieland Band
- Grandsire: Northern Dancer
- Dam: Petite Diable
- Damsire: Sham
- Sex: Stallion
- Foaled: 1989
- Country: United States
- Colour: Dark Bay/Brown
- Breeder: John W. Rooker
- Owner: Michael Watral
- Trainer: Dennis J. Brida
- Record: 15: 6-2-2
- Earnings: US$631,563

Major wins
- Copelan Stakes (1991); Swift Stakes (1992); Withers Stakes (1992); Metropolitan Handicap (1992)
- Last updated on May 14, 2010

Dixie Brass (1989–2002) was an American Thoroughbred racehorse who was one of the leading middle-distance runners in the United States in 1992. Bred in Kentucky by John W. Rooker, he was sold at the Keeneland September Yearling sales and again at the March 1991 Ocala, Florida sale of two-year-olds.

Trained by Dennis Brida for owner Michael Watral, during his racing career Dixie Brass compiled a record of 6-2-2 from 15 starts and earned US$$631,563. Included in his wins were the Grade II Withers Stakes in which he broke a 25-year-old stakes record, and the Grade I Metropolitan Handicap

Dixie Brass suffered a career-ending injury in the Sport Page Handicap at Aqueduct Racetrack and was retired to stud duty. Among his offspring, Dixie Bass sired millionaire multiple Grade II winner, Dixie Dot Com and was the damsire of Brass Hat, as well as Filipino horses Ibarra and Hagdang Bato. He died on January 28, 2002, at age thirteen at The Stallion Park near Millbrook, New York.
