= Philippine Racing Commission =

Philippine government agency

- Komisyon ng Karera sa Pilipinas
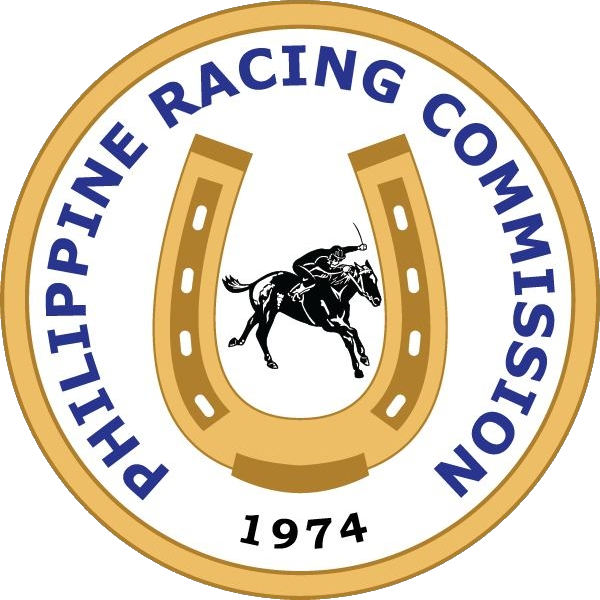
- Seal

Government agency overview
- Formed: 1974
- Type: Sports governing body
- Jurisdiction: Horse racing in the Philippines
- Government agency executives: Aurelio de Leon, Chairman; Ronald Corpuz, Director
- Key document: Presidential Decree No. 420
- Website: philracom.gov.ph

The Philippine Racing Commission (Filipino: Komisyon ng Karera sa Pilipinas), abbreviated as Philracom, is a government agency under the Office of the President that functions as the supervisory and regulatory body of horse racing in the Philippines. The agency was established on March 20, 1974, through Presidential Decree No. 420 signed by then President Ferdinand Marcos.

The supervision and regulation of the betting aspect of horseracing is handled by the Games and Amusements Board.

In April 2016, Philracom was accepted as a member of the International Federation of Horseracing Authorities.

== History ==
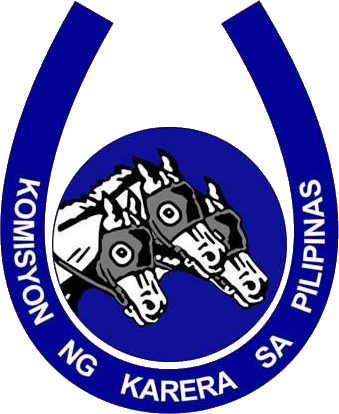
Old logo of Philracom

Republic Act No. 309, An Act to Regulate Horse Racing in the Philippines, was promulgated in 1948. It established the Commission on Racing which was mandated to supervise and regulate the sport.

In 1950, Executive Order No. 392 signed by then-president Elpidio Quirino created the Games and Amusements Board (GAB). The duties and functions of the Commission on Racing as well as the Boxing and Wrestling Commission and "the Jai-Alai" [sic] were transferred to the newly-created GAB.

Philracom was founded in 1974 to handle the growing Philippine Thoroughbred industry, which not only included racing among its activities but also breeding. Horses and feeds were increasingly being imported from abroad, and the Philracom regulated related processes and procedures.

The duties and functions related to horse racing that had been with GAB were transferred to Philracom, except for supervision and regulation of betting which was a function retained by GAB as provided for in Sections 6, 11, 15, 18 and 24 of Republic Act No. 309, and by PD 420.

The agency also implemented greater supervision over the conduct of the sport and wagering system, instituting live broadcast coverage of the races, photo patrol cameras, and other innovations of the time that protected the interests of the betting public.

== Leadership ==
The Commission is presently composed of one chairman and six commissioners. All are appointive positions. Each commissioner represents a sector of the horse racing industry - horseowners, jockeys, trainers, and the racing public. The commissioners meet regularly to deliberate upon matters of policy, direct strategy, and formulate and amend Philippine horse racing rules and regulations.

1975–1978: Eduardo M. Cojuangco Jr. (chairman); Asterio Favis, Alfonso S. Lacson.

1978–1986: Nemesio I. Yabut (chairman); Alfonso S. Lacson, Asterio G. Favis, Enrique P. Romualdez, Federico B. Moreno.

1986–1989: Augusto Benedicto L. Santos (chairman); Amado S. Bagatsing, Jose Y. Quiros, Rogerio P. Gonzales III, Nicanor P. Jacinto III, Federico B. Moreno, Samuel S. Sharuff.

1989–1993: Nicanor P. Jacinto III (chairman); Jose B. Loberiza, Jaime A. Dilag, Fernando C. Carrascoso, Danilo A. Marasigan, Eduardo C. Domingo Jr.

1993–1994: Jose C. Avelino Jr. (chairman); Eduardo C. Domingo Jr., Alberto M. de Castro, Francisco Paulino V. Cayco, Antonio M. Lagdameo, Melvin A. Vargas, Danilo A. Marasigan.

1994–1998: Antonio M. Lagdameo (chairman); Eduardo C. Domingo Jr., Alberto M. de Castro, Lorenzo M. Alberto, Fortunato J. Jayme, Mario M. Oreta, Francisco Paulino V. Cayco.

1998–2001: Benedicto K. Katigbak (chairman); Eduardo C. Domingo Jr., Ramon R. Balatbat, Eduardo T. Galang, Victor V. Tantoco, Dante R. Arevalo, Enrique P. Romualdez.

2001–2002: Andrew A. Sanchez (chairman); Jaime A. Dilag, Francis B. Trillana Jr., Lyndon Noel B. Guce, Vergel A. Cruz, Rogelio A. Tandiama, Antonio C. Alcasid Sr., Felizardo R. Sevilla Jr.

2002–2006: Jaime A. Dilag (chairman); Rogelio A. Tandiama, Eduardo C. Domingo Jr., Vergel A. Cruz, Reynaldo G. Fernando, Francis B. Trillana Jr., Marlon C. Cunanan, Felizardo R. Sevilla Jr., Eduardo B. Jose.

2006–2008: Florencio D. Fianza Jr. (chairman); Jose Ferdinand M. Rojas II, Eduardo C. Domingo Jr., Vergel A. Cruz, Reynaldo G. Fernando, Victor V. Tantoco.

2008–2011: Jose Ferdinand M. Rojas II (chairman); Gerardo J. Espina, Eduardo C. Domingo Jr., Vergel A. Cruz, Reynaldo G. Fernando, Victor V. Tantoco, and James Erving L. Paman.

2011–February 6, 2015: Angel L. Castano Jr. (chairman); Reynaldo G. Fernando, Victor V. Tantoco, Lyndon Noel B. Guce, Franco L. Loyola, Eduardo B. Jose, and Jesus B. Cantos.

February 7, 2015 – February 28, 2019: Andrew A. Sanchez (chairman); Ramon S. Bagatsing Jr., Lyndon Noel B. Guce, Bienvenido C. Niles Jr., Jose P.G. Santillan Jr., Victor V. Tantoco, and Wilfredo Jefferson A. de Ungria (commissioners).

2019–2020: Andrew A. Sanchez (chairman); Lyndon Noel B. Guce, Dante M. Lantin, Bienvenido C. Niles Jr., Victor V. Tantoco, and Wilfredo Jefferson A. de Ungria (commissioners).

2020–present: Aurelio "Reli" P. de Leon (chairman); Dante M. Lantin, Jose S. Embang, Jr., Victor V. Tantoco, and Lyndon Noel B. Guce (commissioners).

== Programs ==
Philracom Trainers Academy In 2015 the Commission, in order to professionalize the horse training sector, established the Philracom Trainers' Academy. It offers a two-year course for horse trainers. The Academy's administrators are veterinarians Dr. Ceferino Maala, member of the National Academy of Science and Technology, and Dr. Romy Modomo, equine medicine practitioner.

In 2017, the Academy graduated its first cohort of trainers, which took the batch name 'First Impact'. Among their members are trainers Dr. Grace Sandoval and Dewey Santos. A second round of training will be opened in April 2019.

The Academy is structured upon the 'educational cohort model', defined as "purposefully grouped students entering and pursuing a program of study together, characterized by social and cultural processes, shared experiences and interactions, collective efforts, and mutual commitment to an educational goal" (Horn, 2001; Maher, 2001, 2005; McPhail, 2000; Norris & Barnett, 1994; Yerkes, Basom, Barnett, & Norris, 1995). Specifically, the Academy follows the 'closed-cohort format', where students are "admitted as an identified group, and provided with a specific rotation of courses over a defined period of time" (Barnett & Muse, 1993; Maher, 2001, 2005).

Corporate Social Responsibility Program Philracom also sponsors charity races for qualified beneficiaries, wherein the prize of the day is donated to the chosen recipient. The agency also holds regular medical and dental missions for the racing community, blood-letting sessions in cooperation with the Red Cross (national), tree-plantings, clothes donations drives, and other initiatives.

Sponsored Stakes Races The Commission regularly sponsors stakes races that provide prize money higher than the usual prize of the day. Among its important annual events are the Commissioner's Cup, the Philippine Triple Crown series (held in summer), Lakambini Stakes (for 3YO fillies), the Ambassador Eduardo M. Cojuangco Jr. Cup (also known as the ECJ Cup), Grand Sprint Championship, and the Chairman's Cup. Stakes races are also staged for local and imported horses, for juveniles, 3YO, and older horses, and for colts and fillies.

== Awards ==
=== Philracom Awards ===
In 2016, the agency inaugurated the annual Philracom Awards, a recognition program that honors the top industry performers of the year.

==== Summary ====
Edition	Awarding ceremony date	Venue	Location	Ref.
1st	February 14, 2016	San Lazaro Leisure Park	Carmona, Cavite	
2nd	March 24, 2017	Saddle and Clubs Leisure Park	Naic, Cavite	
3rd	January 28, 2018	San Lazaro Leisure Park	Carmona, Cavite	
4th	January 20, 2019	San Lazaro Leisure Park	Carmona, Cavite	

==== Awardees ====
1st Philracom Awards: Horse Owner of the Year: Narciso O. Morales; Horse Trainer of the Year: Ruben S. Tupas; Jockey of the Year: Ruben S. Tupas; Most Successful Racing Day: 7th Mayor Ramon D. Bagatsing Sr. Racing Festival; Breeder of the Year: SC Stockfarm, Inc.

2nd Philracom Awards: Horse of the Year: Low Profile; Horse Owner of the Year: Narciso O. Morales; Horse Breeder of the Year: SC Stockfarm, Inc.; Jockey of the Year: Jonathan B. Hernandez; Trainer of the Year: Ruben S. Tupas; Most Successful Racing Festival of the Year: 8th Mayor Ramon D. Bagatsing Sr. Racing Festival; Racing Club of the Year: Philippine Racing Club, Inc.

3rd Philracom Awards: Stakes Racehorse and Top Earning Racehorse of the Year: Sepfourteen; Stakes Races Horse Owner of the Year: SC Stockfarm, Inc.; Top Earning Horse Owner of the Year: Narciso O. Morales; Stakes Races Horse Trainer of the Year: Tomasito E. Santos; Top Earning Horse Trainer of the Year: Ruben S. Tupas; Stakes Races Jockey of the Year: John Alvin Guce; Top Earning Jockey of the Year: O'Neal P. Cortez; Horse Breeder of the Year: SC Stockfarm, Inc.; Most Successful Racing Festival of the Year: 9th Mayor Ramon D. Bagatsing Sr. Racing Festival; Racing Club of the Year (total horse prizes): Manila Jockey Club, Inc.; Racing Club of the Year (total gross sales): Metro Manila Turf Club, Inc.

4th Philracom Awards: Stakes Racehorses of the Year: tie between Pride of Laguna and Smart Candy; Top Earning Horse of the Year: Sepfourteen; Stakes Races Horse Owner of the Year: SC Stockfarm, Inc.; Top Earning Horse Owner of the Year: Narciso O. Morales; Stakes Races Horse Trainer of the Year: Ruben S. Tupas; Top Earning Horse Trainer of the Year: Ruben S. Tupas; Stakes Races Jockey of the Year: Jesse B. Guce; Top Earning Jockey of the Year: O'Neal P. Cortez; Horse Breeder of the Year: Leonardo M. Javier Jr.; Most Successful Racing Festival of the Year: Manila Horsepower, Inc.; Racing Club of the Year (total horse prizes): Manila Jockey Club, Inc.; Racing Club of the Year (total gross sales): Philippine Racing Club, Inc.

=== Hall of Fame ===
The Philracom Hall of Fame was instituted in 2022.

Year	Inductees	Ref.
2022	No information	
2023	Jose "Pepe" Saulog (jockey), Joe Noel Camu (jockey), Jesse Guce (jockey), Patricio Dilema (jockey), JB Hernandez (jockey), Manuel "Maning" Henson (trainer), Ray Henson (trainer), Ruben Tupas (trainer), Rolando "Rolly" Rojas, Henry Cojuangco, and Putch Puyat, Peping Cojuangco, Antonio Manuel "Tonette" Lagdameo, Fernando Poe Jr., Jose “Bebo” Quiroz, Hermie Esguerra	

== See also ==
- Horseracing in the Philippines
