= Philippine Racing Club =

Horse racing institution

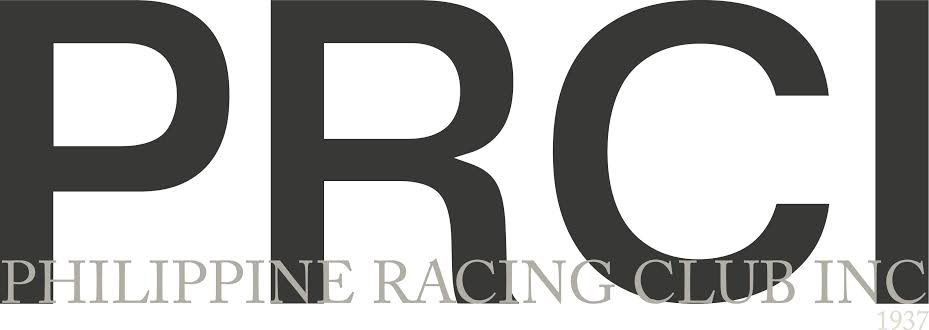
- Traded as: PSE: PRC
- Industry: Horse racing
- Founded: 1937; 89 years ago in Carmona, Makati, Philippine Commonwealth
- Founders: Filipino and American businessmen as co-founders
- Headquarters: Naic, Cavite, Philippines
- Services: Horse race betting and recreation
- Website: www.prci.com.ph

The Philippine Racing Club, Inc. (PRC) is a horse racing institution in the Philippines. Founded in 1937 as the Santa Ana Turf Club in Makati, it is located at the Saddle and Clubs Leisure Park in Naic, Cavite where the Santa Ana Park racetrack is situated.

Currently, it is one of the three racing clubs in the Philippines; the other two are the Manila Jockey Club Incorporated (MJCI), the Metro Manila Turf Club (MetroTurf), and the upstart Philippine Jockey Club (PJC). PRC is a member of the Philippine Racing Commission (Philracom).

== History ==
PRC started out in 1937 when a group of Filipino and American businessmen organized the first racing club during the first years in the Commonwealth era: the Santa Ana Turf Club (SATC). Established as a rival to the Manila Jockey Club, it is the first club to introduce the thoroughbred style of horse racing, and was also organized for the purpose of using horse breeds of "superior quality" for horseracing. In 1939, Commonwealth Act No. 156 was enforced. The purpose of Commonwealth Act No. 156 was to include the Philippine Tuberculosis Society Inc. in the holding of yearly National Grand Derby Races, with the goal of promoting the breeding of local or native horses in the Philippines.

During the Japanese occupation of the Philippines on World War II, the racetrack activities was halted. This was later resumed in 1946 after the war.

In 1947, the ownership of the club was transferred to the Reyes family, led by Don Aurelio Parungao Reyes ("Oreng") who became the club's president until his death in 1972. Following his death, his widow Antonia Reyes took over the operations and the SATC was renamed as the Philippine Racing Club (PRC).

In 1972, the PRC was granted a 25-year franchise through Republic Act No. 6632 to operate a racetrack and conducting horse races.

In 1994, a new management took over the operations of PRC. A year later, PRC's franchise was extended for another 25 years.

In 1996, the PRC acquired a 147-hectare property in Naic, Cavite for a future relocation of the Santa Ana racetrack and made a joint-venture agreement with the Sta. Lucia Realty and Development Corporation for the development of the said property.

In 2008, the PRC held its final year of horse racing activities in Makati.

In 2009, the operations of the PRC and the Santa Ana Park racetrack were transferred to its current site at Saddle and Clubs Leisure Park in Naic, Cavite. The club then entered into a joint venture agreement with Ayala Land and its subsidiary, Alveo Land, in 2011 for the development of the property. The development would later become Circuit Makati, which was opened in 2013.

The Club-Saddle and Clubs Leisure Park in August 2022 announced that "it will drop its horseracing business in November as it focuses on real estate development."
