= Batang Manda =

Filipino Racehorse born 2021

- Breed: Thoroughbred
- Sire: Ultimate Goal
- Grandsire: Storm Cat
- Dam: Posse Left
- Damsire: Posse
- Sex: Stallion
- Foaled: May 10, 2021
- Died: October 26, 2025 (aged 4}
- Country: Philippines
- Colour: Bay
- Breeder: Benhur Abalos
- Owner: Benhur Abalos
- Trainer: Claudio C. Angeles
- Record: 11: 6-2-2

Major wins
- Presidential Gold Cup (2024); Gran Copa De Manila (2025)

Awards
- PSA Horse of the Year (2024)

Batang Manda (foaled May 10, 2021 – October 26, 2025) was a Filipino Thoroughbred racehorse best known for winning the 2024 PCSO Presidential Gold Cup, 2025 Gran Copa De Manila, and winning the 2024 PSA Horse of the Year.

== Background ==
Batang Manda was bred and owned by politician Benhur Abalos, who is also known for breeding and owning several successful Filipino horses, including Ibarra, and Triple Crown winners Hagdang Bato and Heneral Kalentong.

He was sired by Ultimate Goal out of a mare named Posse Left. He is a grandson of Storm Cat.

== Racing career ==
=== 2024: Three-year-old season ===
On January 21, he ran in the 1400m Philracom 3yo Maiden Stakes, ridden by Patricio Dilema, he led for the entire race, winning by four lengths.

He would gain another win in March 9, in race 8 over 1400m, winning at a time of 1:26.6.

On April 14, he ran in the Road to Triple Crown Stakes race, winning it, however he failed to win any legs of the Triple Crown, finishing third in the first leg and failing to place on the second leg and finishing second in the third leg.

On December 8, as a longshot entry, he would compete in the PCSO Presidential Gold Cup, which at the time had a record purse of ₱12,000,000, managing to hold off future Gold cup winner Don Julio and winning the race.

=== 2025: Four year-old season ===
As his first start of the year, he would compete in the first division of the Commissioners cup in February 16, and for most of the race he would be in the front with Worshipful Master, before being caught by Basheirrou at the final turn and ultimately finishing third, while Basheirrou won the race and Jungkook is in second.

On June 24, he ran in the Gran Copa De Manila, overtaking King James in the far turn before crossing the finish line with Jungkook in second.

On July 27, he ran in the PCSO Silver Cup, placing second with Jungkook winning the race.

On October 5, he ran in the PCSO Anniversary race at a distance of 1800m, winning the race. He died while training, 21 days later.

== Awards ==
At the 2025 PSA Annual Awards on January 27, 2025, he was honored as the Horse of the Year for the Year 2024, along with his owner, who was named Horse Owner of the Year.

In the 27th Philtobo Ginto ng Lahi Awards, he was awarded Champion Horse of the Year, as well as Champion Three-Year Old Colt.

== Pedigree ==
Pedigree of Batang Manda, Bay Stallion
Sire Ultimate Goal	Storm Cat	Storm Bird	Northern Dancer
Sire Ultimate Goal	Storm Cat	Storm Bird	South Ocean
Sire Ultimate Goal	Storm Cat	Terlingua	Secretariat
Sire Ultimate Goal	Storm Cat	Terlingua	Crimson Saint
Sire Ultimate Goal	Sister Act	Saint Ballado	Halo
Sire Ultimate Goal	Sister Act	Saint Ballado	Ballade
Sire Ultimate Goal	Sister Act	La Ice Queen	Icecapade
Sire Ultimate Goal	Sister Act	La Ice Queen	La Queen Bina
Dam Posse Left	Posse	Silver Deputy	Deputy Minister
Dam Posse Left	Posse	Silver Deputy	Silver Valley
Dam Posse Left	Posse	Raska	Rahy
Dam Posse Left	Posse	Raska	Borishka
Dam Posse Left	Never Left	Seattle Slew	Bold Reasoning
Dam Posse Left	Never Left	Seattle Slew	My Charmer
Dam Posse Left	Never Left	Safe Return	Mr. Prospector
Dam Posse Left	Never Left	Safe Return	Safely Kept
