= Hermie Esguerra =

Filipino businessman and racehorse owner (born 1954)

Personal information
- Full name: Herminio S. Esguerra
- Nickname: Hermie
- Nationality: Filipino
- Born: March 7, 1954 (age 72) Plaridel, Bulacan, Philippines
- Occupations: Businessman, racehorse breeder and owner

Horse racing career
- Sport: Horse racing

Major racing wins
- Presidential Gold Cup (2006, 2017)

Honors
- PHILTOBO Horse Breeder of the Year (2006, 2007, 2008, 2009, 2010, 2012, 2013, 2016, 2025); Philracom Hall of Fame (2023)

Significant horses
- Real Spicy; Dewey Boulevard; Wind Blown

Herminio S. Esguerra (born March 7, 1954) is a Filipino businessman, Thoroughbred racehorse breeder and owner.

== Early life ==
Hermie Esguerra was on March 7, 1954 in Plaridel, Bulacan. He graduated at the University of the East in 1975 with a degree in political science and economics. He initially worked as a marketing representative of United Laboratories before moving to Petrolphil (now Petron Corporation)

== Business career ==
Esguerra and two friends co-founded Transline Inc., a company engaged in bunkering. Herma Corporation was established in 1985 by Esguerra, a company involved in the maritime and agroindustry.

He also expanded his family’s rest house and horse lodge, established in 2000, into the 70-hectare (170-acre) Esguerra Farms and Stud Inc. The farm and stable in Lipa, Batangas is known for breeding Berkshire pig for Kurobuta pork. It also cultivates fruits and vegetables, and raises other animals such as horses, sheep, and goats.

== Horse racing career ==
The Esguerra Farms and Stud is known for producing Thoroughbred racehorses.

Horses he own which won the Presidential Gold Cup are Real Spicy (2006) and Dewey Boulevard (2017) Two-time Gold Cup winner Wind Blown (2000, 2001) was also bought by Esguerra from Sandy Javier in late 2001.

Esguerra himself has been named Horse Breeder of the Year nine times by the Philippine Thoroughbred Owners and Breeders Organization (PHILTOBO), receiving the award in 2006, 2007, 2008, 2009, 2010, 2012, 2013, 2016, and 2025. He was also inducted to the Philippine Racing Commission Hall of Fame in 2023.
