= Carmona, Makati =

Barangay in Makati, Metro Manila, Philippines

Carmona
- Barangay
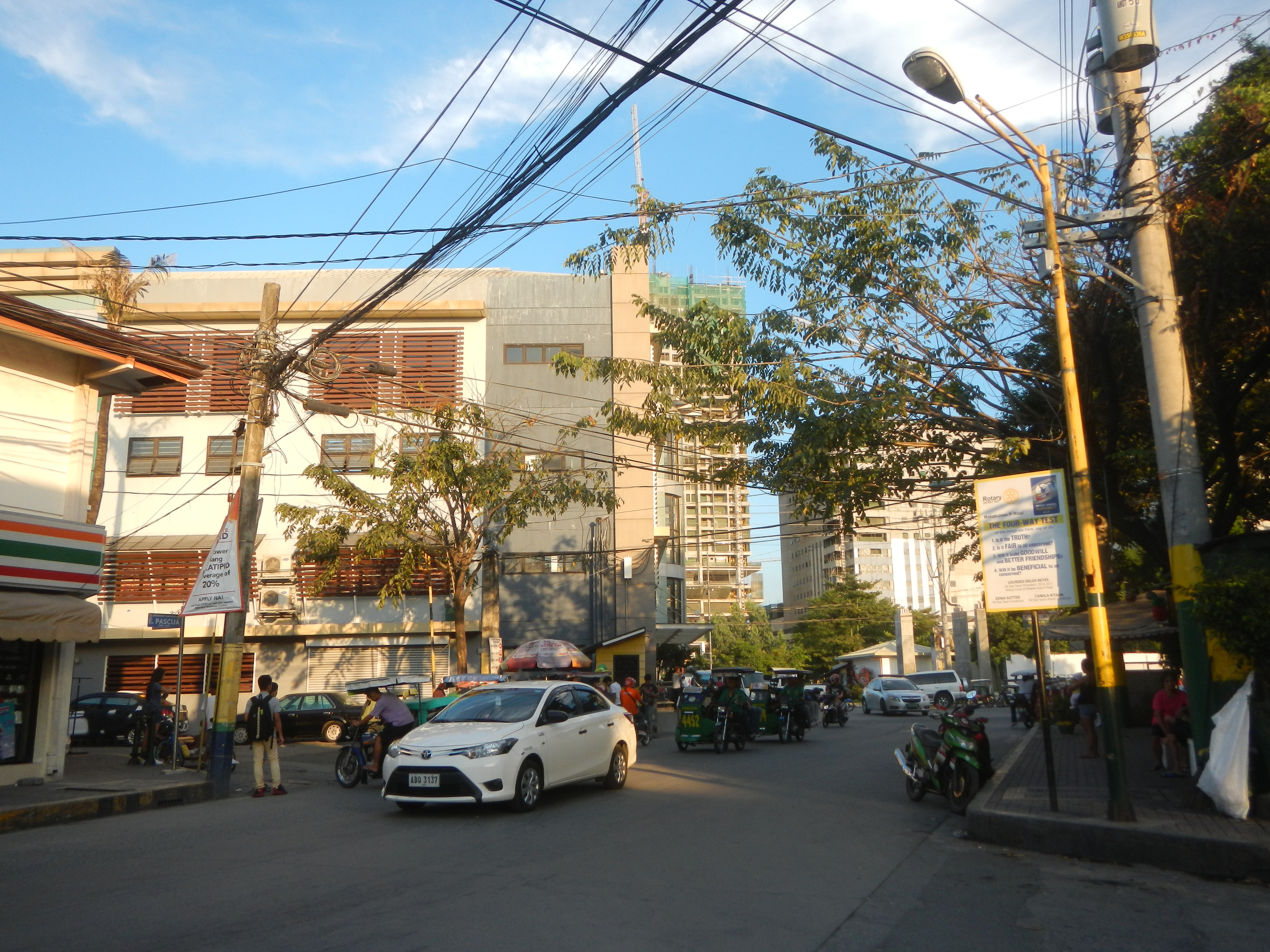
- E. Pascua Street with Carmona Sports Complex and Circuit Makati on the background
- Interactive map of Carmona
- Location within Metro Manila
- Coordinates: 14°34′33.89″N 121°1′6.45″E
- Country: Philippines
- Region: National Capital Region
- City: Makati
- District: 1st Legislative district of Makati
- Established: 1960
- Named for: Isidro Carmona

Government
  - Type: Barangay
  - Barangay Captain: Ricardo Perfecto Garcia
  - Sangguniang Barangay: List: Percilon Ilan; Andre Iñigo Chua; Frederick Perez; Gilbert Cruz; Liberato Layug; Peter John Santos; Jeffrey Sordan
  - SK Chairman: Mikyllie Chua
  - SK Kagawad: List: Matthew Cruz; Kristiana De Guzman; Renee Benito; Christel Guion; Zeala Pamintuan; Gelthy Gonzalvo; Paul Reyes

Area
  - Total: 0.34 km^{2} (0.13 sq mi)

Population (2020)
  - Total: 2,745
  - Density: 8,100/km^{2} (21,000/sq mi)
- Time zone: UTC+8 (PST)
- Postal Code: 1207
- Area code: 02
- PSGC: 137602000

Carmona is one of the 23 barangays of Makati. It is located in the northern part of the city. It is a residential area with a population of 2,745 as of the 2020 census, making it the least populous barangay in the city. The barangay was named after Comandante Isidro Carmona, a Filipino soldier who fought during the Philippine Revolution against the Spaniards.

== History ==
From the American period and under a sovereign Republic of the Philippines, Carmona was a sitio of Barrio Tejeros until the early 1960s. The full official name of the then sitio was Comandante Carmona. It was also alternatively spelled as Kupang, apparently stylized in Tagalog. Its namesake was the Filipino commander Isidro Carmona, who participated in several revolts during the 1896 Philippine Revolution against the Spanish Empire.

The barrio captains Miling Mangahas and Emiliano San Pascual, along with their respective barrio councilors, worked to have Carmona secede from Tejeros as an independent barangay that later came into fruition.

== Landmarks ==
- Circuit Makati, a 21-hectare mixed-use development on the former Sta. Ana Racetrack property of the Philippine Racing Club Inc. (PRCI). Considered as Makati's entertainment district, it is a collaboration among Ayala Land, Inc., PRCI and the City of Makati, which completes the vision for Makati to be a leading city for entertainment, lifestyle and business.
- Maximo Estrella Elementary School, the only public elementary school in the barangay, located on J. Magsaysay Street.
- Carmona Sports Complex, located at A. P. Reyes Avenue, is a mixed-use sports facility with parking space, maintained by the barangay government.
- Carmona Multi-purpose Hall, the seat of the barangay government of Carmona, located at A. P. Reyes Avenue.
