= Ibarra (horse) =

Filipino-bred thoroughbred racehorse

- Sire: Yoneguska
- Dam: Fire Down Under
- Damsire: Dixie Brass
- Sex: Stallion
- Foaled: 2004
- Died: 2020 (aged 15–16)
- Country: Philippines
- Owner: Benhur Abalos
- Jockey: Antonio Alcasid Jr. Jess Guce

Major wins
- PCSO First Gentleman's Silver Cup (2010); Presidential Gold Cup (2008); Cojuangco Cup (2007); JV Ongpin Cup (2007)

Honors
- PSA Horse of the Year (2009)

Ibarra (2004–2020) was a Filipino Thoroughbred. Owned by Benhur Abalos, the horse was the 2008 Presidential Gold Cup champion.

== Background ==
Ibarra was sired by Yoneguska out of Fire Down Under. Ibarra's dam was purchased by Benhur Abalos from Mar Tirona, who in turn purchased her in Keeneland, Kentucky in the United States. His younger brother Hagdang Bato was out of Quaker Ridge. Ibarra himself after racing served as a sire before he died sometime in 2020.

== Horse racing career ==
Ibarra still undefeated at the time, was a strong contender for the 2007 Philracom Triple Crown, having secured victories in the first two legs. However, he did not enter third leg after veterinarians discovered bone chips in his upper right knee and underwent an operation. Owner Abalos opted to rest him, prioritizing the horse's long-term health over the chance to secure a Triple Crown title.

He went on to win the 2008 Presidential Gold Cup. Kevin Albobo was the jockey.

His first ever rider was Antonio Alcasid Jr. Other jockeys who have rode Ibarra also include Jess Guce.

Ibarra alongside Go Army were also recognized as a Horse of the Year at the 2009 PSA Annual Awards.

== Pedigree ==
Pedigree of Ibarra (PHI), bay horse 2004
Sire Yonaguska (USA) 1998	Cherokee Run (USA); 1990	Runaway Groom (CAN); 1979	Blushing Groom (FR); 1974
Sire Yonaguska (USA) 1998	Cherokee Run (USA); 1990	Runaway Groom (CAN); 1979	Yonnie Girl (USA); 1966
Sire Yonaguska (USA) 1998	Cherokee Run (USA); 1990	Cherokee Dame (USA); 1980	Silver Saber (USA); 1972
Sire Yonaguska (USA) 1998	Cherokee Run (USA); 1990	Cherokee Dame (USA); 1980	Dame Francesca (USA); 1966
Sire Yonaguska (USA) 1998	Marital Spook (USA); 1990	Silver Ghost (USA); 1982	Mr. Prospector (USA); 1970
Sire Yonaguska (USA) 1998	Marital Spook (USA); 1990	Silver Ghost (USA); 1982	Homewrecker (USA); 1983
Sire Yonaguska (USA) 1998	Marital Spook (USA); 1990	Buckaroo (horse) (USA); 1975	Buckpasser (USA); 1963
Sire Yonaguska (USA) 1998	Marital Spook (USA); 1990	Buckaroo (horse) (USA); 1975	Execution (USA); 1975
Dam Fire Down Under (USA) 1995	Dixie Brass (USA); 1989	Dixieland Band (USA); 1980	Northern Dancer (CAN); 1961
Dam Fire Down Under (USA) 1995	Dixie Brass (USA); 1989	Dixieland Band (USA); 1980	Mississippi Mud (USA); 1973
Dam Fire Down Under (USA) 1995	Dixie Brass (USA); 1989	Petite Diable	Sham
Dam Fire Down Under (USA) 1995	Dixie Brass (USA); 1989	Petite Diable	Taste of Life
Dam Fire Down Under (USA) 1995	Fired Heater (USA); 1990	World Appeal	Valid Appeal
Dam Fire Down Under (USA) 1995	Fired Heater (USA); 1990	World Appeal	Go Go Windy
Dam Fire Down Under (USA) 1995	Fired Heater (USA); 1990	Dance All Summer	Summer Time Guy
Dam Fire Down Under (USA) 1995	Fired Heater (USA); 1990	Dance All Summer	Meadow Dancer (Family: 11-f)
