= Sandy Javier =

Filipino politician and businessman (born 1951)

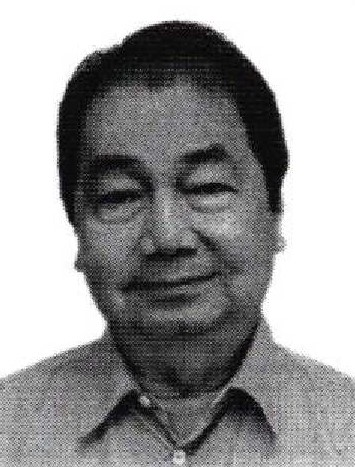
- Javier's certificate of candidacy photo in 2024

Vice Governor of Leyte
- Incumbent
- Assumed office June 30, 2022
- Governor: Jericho Petilla
- Preceded by: Carlo Loreto

Mayor of Javier
- In office June 30, 2010 – June 30, 2019
- Preceded by: Leni Cua
- Succeeded by: Michael Javier

Personal details
- Born: Leonardo Morales Javier Jr. January 28, 1951 (age 75)
- Party: NPC (2024–present)
- Other political affiliations: PDP (2021–2024); Liberal (2009–2021)
- Spouse: Lolita Tañala
- Children: Jassie Lou (son), Michael Dragon (son), Maverick (son), Mica Javier (daughter)
- Relatives: Danny Javier (brother), George Javier (brother), Jimmy Javier (brother)
- Occupation: Businessman, Politician
- Horse racing career
- Occupations: Horse breeder and owner
- Sport: Horse racing

Racing awards
- PSA Horse Owner of the Year (2024)

Significant horses
- Wind Blown

Leonardo "Sandy" Morales Javier Jr. is a Filipino politician, businessman, and Thoroughbred racehorse breeder and owner. He has served as the vice governor of Leyte since 2022 and is also the owner of Andok's, a roasted chicken chain.

== Early life and education ==
Leonardo "Sandy" Morales Javier Jr. was born on January 28, 1951. He is the eldest of five children of Leonardo "Andok" Javier Sr., who was an engineer. Sandy Javier graduated from the Ateneo de Manila University.

In his 30s, Javier traveled to Japan, where he worked various odd jobs. He has also recounted earning money by allowing members of the yakuza to slap him. He subsequently moved to Germany as an undocumented worker, where he lived with an American and worked as a television repairman. He returned to the Philippines after learning that his father was gravely ill.

== Political career ==
=== Mayor of Javier ===
Sandy Javier was a previous mayor of the municipality of Javier, Leyte. He was elected as mayor in 2010 ending the Cua family's control over the town. Javier succeeded Joel Cua. His son Michael Dragon was elected as vice mayor, marking the younger Javier's debut in politics.

Sandy Javier has also served as president of the League of Municipalities of the Philippines.

=== Vice Governor of Leyte ===
Sandy Javier was elected as the vice governor of Leyte during the 2022 election. He ran unopposed for a new term in the 2025 election.

== Business career ==
Javier is the owner of the rotisserie chain Andok's. He started the business before entering politics and named it after his father.

== Horseracing career ==
Sandy Javier is involved in the horse racing scene in the Philippines. He owns several horses such as Presidential Gold Cup champions Strong Material, Wind Blown, Empire King, Magna Carta, and Super Sonic.

Javier had been breeding horses at the Royal Maverick Ranch in Rosario, Batangas since at least 1995. This includes Strong Material and Wind Blown. The latter horse is a two-time Gold Cup champion.

Javier was recognized as the Horse Owner of the Year at the 2024 PSA Annual Awards.

== Personal life ==
Javier is married to Lolita Tañala He is part of a political family with his wife Tañala having served as a member of the Houses of the Representatives for Leyte's 2nd district. His son, Jassie Lou has served as mayor of Jaro and his other son, Michael Dragon is mayor of Javier municipality. His daughter, Mica Javier is a singer and actress.

Sandy Javier's brothers include comedian George Javier and singer Danny Javier, a member of the Apo Hiking Society.
