= Santa Ana Park (Makati) =

Horse racing venue in Makati, Philippines

- Location: Makati, Philippines
- Owned by: Philippine Racing Club
- Operated by: Philippine Racing Club
- Date opened: 1937
- Date closed: 2008
- Notable races: Presidential Gold Cup

The Santa Ana Park was a horse racing venue in Makati, Metro Manila, Philippines which was operated by Philippine Racing Club until 2008.

== History ==
The Santa Ana Park was owned and operated by the Philippine Racing Club which was established as the Santa Ana Turf Club in 1937.

The Santa Ana course was an occasional host of the Presidential Gold Cup.

Plans for the PRC to build a new race course in Cavite had been in place as early as 1996. The Santa Ana race course closed in 2008. In 2009, the club moved to the Saddle and Clubs Leisure Park in Tanza, Cavite.

Ayala Land and Alveo entered into an agreement with the PRC in 2011 and the former site was developed into Circuit Makati.
