= Santa Ana Park (Cavite) =

Mixed-used sports venue in Cavite, Philippines

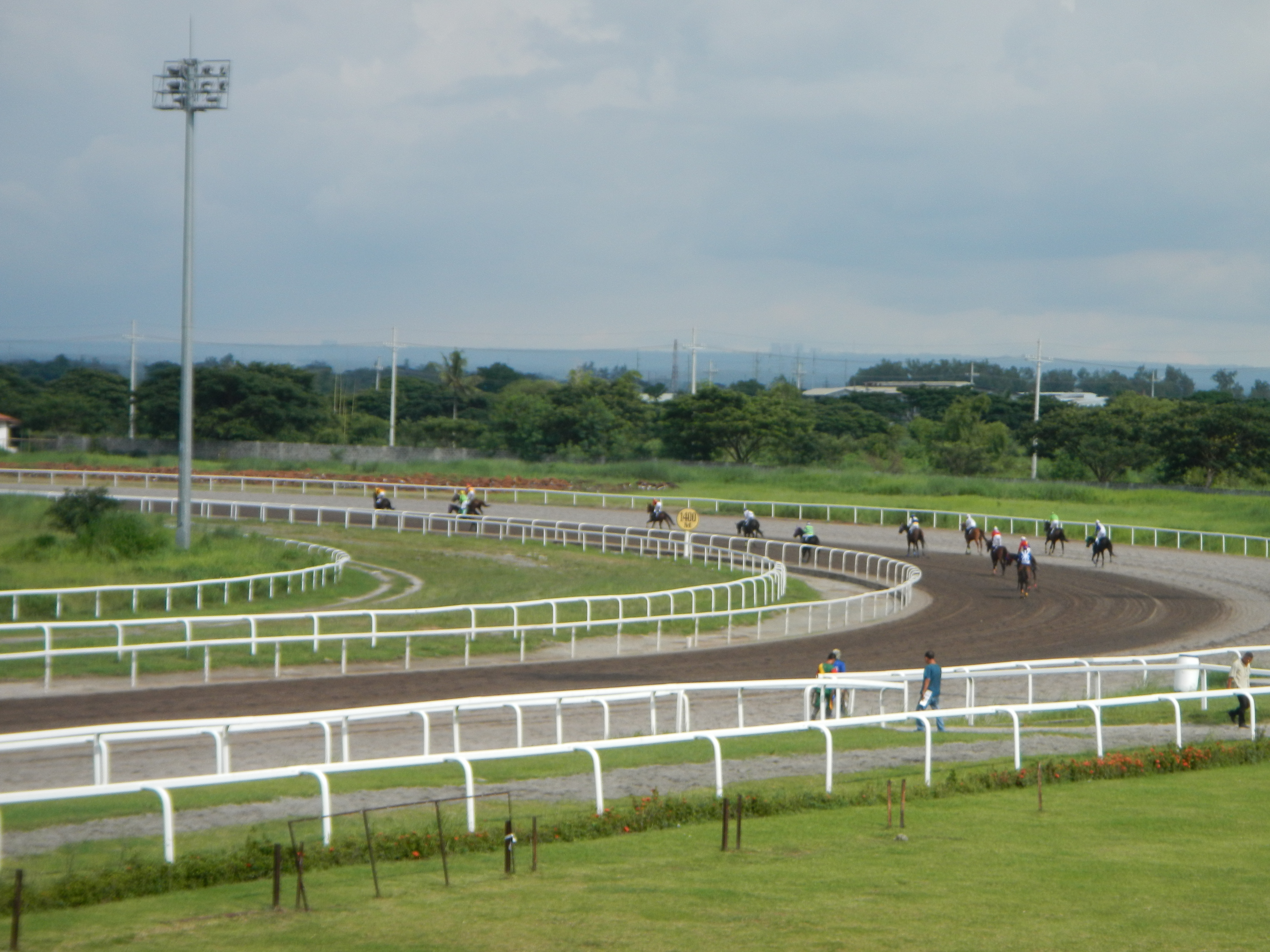
- Santa Ana Park race track in 2013.
- Interactive map of Santa Ana Park
- Location: Saddle and Clubs Leisure Park, Naic, Cavite, Philippines
- Coordinates: 14°18′45″N 120°49′20″E
- Owned by: Philippine Racing Club
- Date opened: 2009
- Date closed: 2022
- Screened on: Cignal: Channel 107; Cablelink: Channel 59
- Notable races: PCSO Presidential Gold Cup; PCSO Silver Cup

The Santa Ana Park was a horse racing track within the Saddle and Clubs Leisure Park, a mixed-used venue in Naic, Cavite, Philippines. It hosts the Philippine Racing Club.

== History ==
The Philippine Racing Club's original racetrack, Santa Ana Park, was built on 25 hectares (62 acres) of land within Barangay Carmona in Makati.

In 1996, the Philippine Racing Club acquired a 147-hectare property in Naic, Cavite for a planned relocation of Santa Ana Park, and made a joint-venture agreement with the Sta. Lucia Realty and Development Corporation for the development of a new venue.

In 2009, Saddle and Clubs Leisure Park was opened, and the Santa Ana Park racetrack was transferred to this site. The former site was converted into a mixed-used development under the name Circuit Makati.

In 2022, the Philippine Racing Club announced that "it will drop its horseracing business in November as it focuses on real estate development." Hence the Leisure Park shut down its operations.

== See also ==
- Philippine Racing Club
