= Philippine Charity Sweepstakes Office =

Government-owned and controlled corporation of the Philippines

- Seal
- Formation: October 30, 1934; 92 years ago
- Type: Government-owned and controlled corporation
- Location: Sun Plaza Building, 1507 Princeton Street corner Shaw Boulevard, Mandaluyong 1552, Metro Manila, Philippines
- Region served: Philippines
- Services: Lotteries
- Owner: Government of the Philippines
- Key people: Felix Reyes (Chairman); Melquiades A. Robles (General Manager)
- Parent organization: Office of the President of the Philippines
- Website: www.pcso.gov.ph

The Philippine Charity Sweepstakes Office (PCSO; Filipino: Tanggapan sa Charity Sweepstakes ng Pilipinas) is a government-owned and controlled corporation that operates national and local lotteries in the Philippines. It is under direct supervision of the Office of the President of the Philippines.

PCSO is mandated to do fund raising and provide funds for health programs, medical assistance and services, and charities of national character. The raised collections go to the President's Presidential Social Fund to improve the country's social welfare.

== Sources of Revenue ==
- Sweepstakes Draw
- National Lotteries (Lotto)
- Small Town Lotteries (to compete with jueteng, an illegal gambling practice)
- Scratchcard (Scratch-it)
- Horse Racing

== Allocation of Net Receipts ==
- Fifty-five percent shall be set aside as a prize fund for the payment of prizes, including those for the owners, jockeys of running horses, and sellers of winning tickets. Prizes not claimed within one year from date of draw shall be considered forfeited, and shall form part of the charity fund for disposition.
- Thirty percent shall be set aside as contributions to the charity/ social fund of the Office of the President.
- Fifteen percent shall be set aside as contributions to the operating expenses and capital expenditures of the PCSO.
- All balances of any funds in the Philippine Charity Sweepstakes Office shall revert to and form part of the charity fund.

The disbursements of these allocations are subject to state auditing rules and regulations.

== History ==
=== Before the establishment of the PCSO ===
Lotteries were introduced in the Philippines in 1833, as the company called Real Renta de Loteria was founded on January 29, 1850, and the first draw was held on January 21, 1851, under the auspices of private enterprises called the Empresa de Reales Loterias Españolas de Filipinas, the Spanish government conducted loterias to generate revenues. José Rizal won ₱6,200.00 in the draw of 1892, while on exile in Dapitan. He donated his winnings to an educational project.

The loteria was forced to stop operations during the outbreak of the Spanish–American War on July 19, 1898.

In 1932, the first Sweepstakes draw after the last loteria was conducted by the American Insular government to raise funds to support sports projects for the Filipino youth through the Philippine Amateur Athletic Federation (PAAF) – the beneficiary of the first draw. After the success of the PAAF Sweepstakes, the government decided to conduct more draws for the benefit of the Philippine Anti-Tuberculosis Society, now the Philippine Tuberculosis Society (PTS). The draws were held under the auspices of an organization called the National Charity Sweepstakes (NCS).

=== The establishment of the PCSO ===
In March 1935, then President Manuel L. Quezon approved Act No. 301 – the law passed by the Philippine Legislature on October 30, 1934, creating the Philippine Charity Sweepstakes Office (PCSO), replacing the then National Charity Sweepstakes. Under this law, the new organization was authorized to secure from the National Treasury a loan amounting to ₱250,000.00, the minimum amount required for organizing the office and printing the tickets for the draw. On September 8, 1935, the new agency held its first Sweepstakes draw. The loan was paid back in less than two months and shortly after the note was signed, proceeds from the sales started coming in.

Among its beneficiaries then were the Philippine Amateur Athletic Federation (PAAF; today the Philippine Olympic Committee), the Philippine Tuberculosis Society (PTS), the National Federation of Women's Clubs, the Asociación de Damas de Filipinas, the Gota de Leche, the Associate of Manila and the Provinces, the Philippine Islands Council of the Boy Scouts of America, the Asilo para Invalidos de los Veteranos de la Revolución, the Child Welfare Center and other institutions and organizations engaged in charitable and health work, or work for the improvement of the conditions of the indigent Filipino masses.

Its corporate charter was enacted into law under Republic Act No. 1169 on June 18, 1954, by Ramon Magsaysay. It repealed Act No. 430, as amended by Commonwealth Act Nos. 301 and 546 and by Republic Acts Nos. 72 and 574. In September 1979, Batas Pambansa Blg. 42 was enacted to raise the fund allocation for the agency's Charity Fund and for the use of unclaimed prizes.

=== Modern history (1987-present) ===
In 1987, the PCSO launched the small-town lottery (STL) and Instant Sweepstakes, the STL is intended to compete with jueteng, a popular but illegal numbers game that is criticized as a major source of corruption in local government units and was suspended in 1990.

In January 1995, during the incumbency of then Chairman Manuel Morato, the PCSO launched the very first online lottery in the Philippines known as Lotto, its first draw was held on March 8, 1995. Similar to lotteries in the United States, Europe and Australia, the automated gaming, initially the Lotto 6/42 and later expanded to Mega Lotto 6/45, 6-Digit Lotto and 4-Digit Lotto in 1997, Super Lotto 6/49 in 2000, Swertres 3D Lotto in 2002, EZ2 Lotto in 2004, Grand Lotto 6/55 in 2010 and Ultra Lotto 6/58 in 2015, the player chooses any set of 6 numbers from 1 to 42 and wins when these numbers are drawn in any sequence during the draw date. An equipment lease was signed with Malaysia's Berjaya Sports Toto Berhad.

In 1997, the company was renamed Philippine Charity Sweepstakes Office.

On March 20, 2006, through the advice of then President Gloria Macapagal Arroyo, the PCSO revived the small-town lottery (STL).

On July 26, 2019, in a speech, President Rodrigo Duterte declared PCSO games as "illegal" due to corruption allegations and closing down the lotto outlets across the country by the Philippine National Police (PNP), temporarily suspending its gaming operations after the speech, Lotto operations were resumed on July 31, 2019, and small-town-lottery operations on August 22, 2019.

From July 26 to August 26, 2019, President Rodrigo Duterte has suspended the STL operations around the country due to allegations of corruption.

On March 17, 2020, PCSO's gaming-related operations such as Lotto, Keno, digit games and small-town lottery in Luzon is temporarily suspended for the second time following the enhanced community quarantine in Luzon amid COVID-19 pandemic.

On April 7, 2020, PCSO announced that small-town lottery in Visayas and Mindanao is temporarily suspended for the second time due to the COVID-19 pandemic.

On April 16, 2020, Davao City Mayor Sara Duterte banned small-town lottery in Davao City for the second time, also due to the COVID-19 pandemic.

On October 1, 2023, PCSO launched its state-of-the-art Philippine Lottery System (PLS) after nearly 3 decades. The PLS now has a single and centralized lotto system run by one operator – the same two lotto systems providers but combined in a joint venture.

On December 15, 2023, PCSO launched its Test run of E-Lotto. With the introduction of the e-lotto web-based platform, players and bettors can use their laptops or PCs to place bets, purchase lottery e-tickets, and make payments using GCash e-wallets.

On August 1, 2024, PCSO breaks ground on P 2.2-b ultra-modern corporate center located in Ermita, Manila. The P 2.2-billion project is expected to become the permanent home for the agency's employees and stakeholders, while allowing a 24/7 operational capability for designated operations.

In August 2024, Supreme Court Justice Marvic Leonen granted Yeng Guiao's 2016 mandamus nullifying the Ramos-era Pagcor memorandum. It directed the PCSO to account and refund to the Philippine Sports Commission, 30% charity fund from the six lottery draws annually, starting 2006.

== Controversies ==
=== Killing of Wesley Barayuga ===
On July 30, 2020, Wesley Barayuga, the PCSO's board secretary, was shot dead by an unidentified gunman on a motorcycle who opened fire at his vehicle in Mandaluyong. At a hearing by the House of Representatives in 2024, a police officer accused former PCSO general manager Royina Garma and National Police Commission commissioner Edilberto Leonardo, then a police colonel, of ordering the killing, citing Barayuga's alleged involvement in illegal drugs. Both Garma and Leonardo denied the allegations.

=== January 2024 viral lotto winner photo ===
In January 2024, a photo of a 6/42 Lotto jackpot winner claiming her ₱43 million prize check from the PCSO went viral on social media after netizens found that certain features of the supposed winner were "poorly edited". A Senate inquiry on the legitimacy of the winner ensued, with the PCSO admitting that the photo could have been edited properly but explained the editing was necessary to conceal the identity of the winner. The PCSO revealed they have had complaints from winners whose identity was recognized through their clothing by people close to them, even though their face was covered. The PCSO assured that the supposed winner is a real person, describing the bettor as a 47-year-old housewife from San Jose Del Monte, Bulacan whose winning numbers reportedly came from "her family's birthdates and two other 'lucky' numbers"; she claimed her prize on December 28, 2023, at the PCSO's main office in Mandaluyong. Senator Raffy Tulfo has said he will conduct a thorough investigation on the legitimacy of lotto winners beginning January 25, 2024, and the PCSO vowed to disclose the name of the winner to the committee should they get subpoenaed.

The photo has since been parodied and turned into memes by brands and netizens on social media.

=== 3D Lotto Glitch ===
On February 27, 2024, during the 3D Lotto draw, a draw machine malfunctioned. After the live stream was halted for 15 minutes, a new machine was used to draw the first number again. The second and third digits were unchanged. Senator Imee Marcos, who earlier called for the temporary halting of PCSO draws, said she was stunned after watching the live stream video.

=== PCSO funding controversy ===
The Philippine Center for Investigative Journalism has reported that there are 66 corporate records wherein Estrada, his wife, mistresses and children are listed as incorporators or board members. Thirty-one of these companies were set up during Estrada's vice-presidential tenure and one when he assumed the presidency. Based on the 1998 and 1999 financial statements, 14 of the 66 companies have assets of over ₱600 million.

On October 15, 1998, First Lady Loi Ejercito, registered with the Securities and Exchange Commission her private foundation—the Partnership for the Poor Foundation, Inc.—which provides relief and livelihood to the poor. A few months after its incorporation, the foundation received ₱100 million from the Philippine Charity Sweepstakes Office (PCSO) as donation. The donation far exceeded the PCSO's combined donation of ₱65 million to regular beneficiaries like orphanages and hospitals. The complainants consider this a conflict-of-interest. The donation of government funds to the private foundation of the First Lady was also found to have been delivered to their legal residence in San Juan, Metro Manila.

== See also ==
- Games and Amusements Board
- Philippine Amusement and Gaming Corporation
