= The Horsemen's Track =

Horse racing complex in Batangas, Philippines

- Interactive map of The Horsemen's Track
- Location: Padre Garcia, Batangas, Philippines
- Coordinates: 13°53′31.6″N 121°12′11.7″E
- Owned by: Hapi Jockey Club, Inc. (doing business as Philippine Jockey Club)
- Date opened: November 12, 2025

The Horsemen's Track is a horse racing complex in Padre Garcia, Batangas, Philippines. It is owned and operated by the Philippine Jockey Club.

== Background ==
The construction of The Horsemen's Track was followed by the granting of a 25-year franchise to the Hapi Jockey Club, Inc. (HJCI) by the Philippine government through Republic Act 11649 which took effect in March 2022 allowing the organization to maintain racetracks in Batangas, Cavite and Laguna.

Groundbreaking for The Horsemen's Track in Padre Garcia, Batangas took place on May 3, 2022. The venue was projected to open in 2024.

Sandy Javier is among the noted investors of the project. PJC raised ₱1 billion to fund the initial phase of the sand-based racecourse.

The Horsemen's Track opened on November 12, 2025.

== Facilities ==
The Horsemen's Track was patterned after the Churchill Downs in Louisville, United States which reportedly is a departure from other race tracks in the Philippines. Built on 50-hectare (120-acre) land, the twin oval track will have a tunnel and a gallery for spectators. The outer track is 1,600 meters (5,200 ft) in circumference. It was designed by Steve Woods who was behind some race tracks in the United States.

== Incidents ==
- During the running of the sixth race at Philippine Jockey Club in Padre Garcia, Batangas on January 17, 2026, 33-year-old jockey Elvin A. Abrea on top of the 4-years old filly, ‘Fly with the Wind’ was dismounted and was trampled on his head by horse ‘Official Seal’, ridden by jockey JM Estorque who was coming from behind him and died.
