= San Lazaro Leisure Park =

Mixed-use venue in Cavite, Philippines

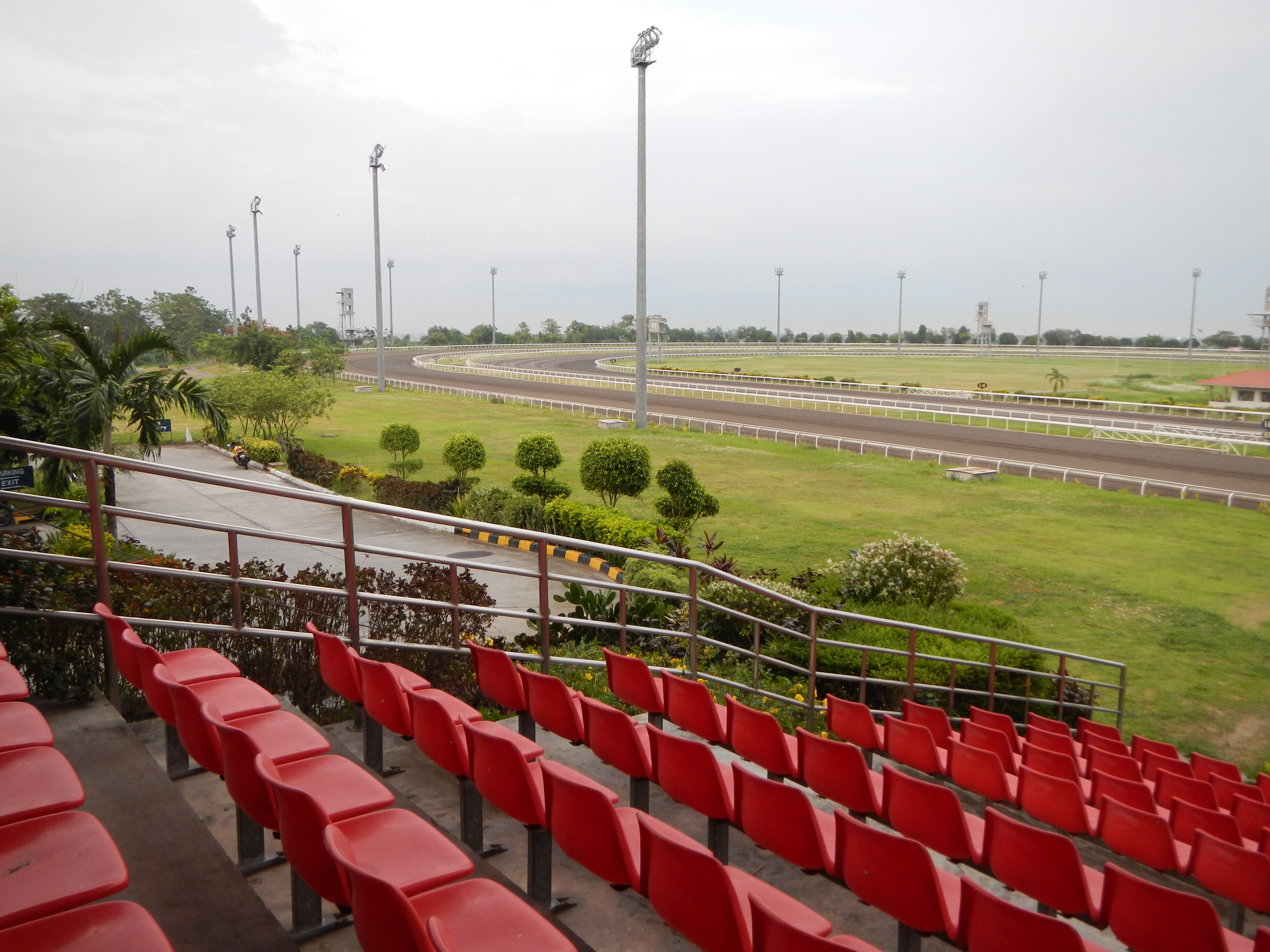
- Interactive map of San Lazaro Leisure Park
- Location: San Lazaro Leisure and Business Park; Carmona, Cavite, Philippines
- Coordinates: 14°17′48″N 121°2′12″E
- Owned by: Manila Jockey Club
- Date opened: 2003
- Date closed: 2022
- Screened on: Cignal (Nationwide); Cablelink and SkyCable (Metro Manila)
- Notable races: Presidential Gold Cup; MJCI Founders Cup

The San Lazaro Leisure Park is a mixed-used venue which features a racetrack in Carmona, Cavite, Philippines. It is the home of the Manila Jockey Club (MJC).

The leisure park occupies a land 77 hectares (770,000 m^{2}) and houses around 1,800 thoroughbreds as of 2015. Its horse racing operations lasted from its inception in 2013 until 2022.

== History ==
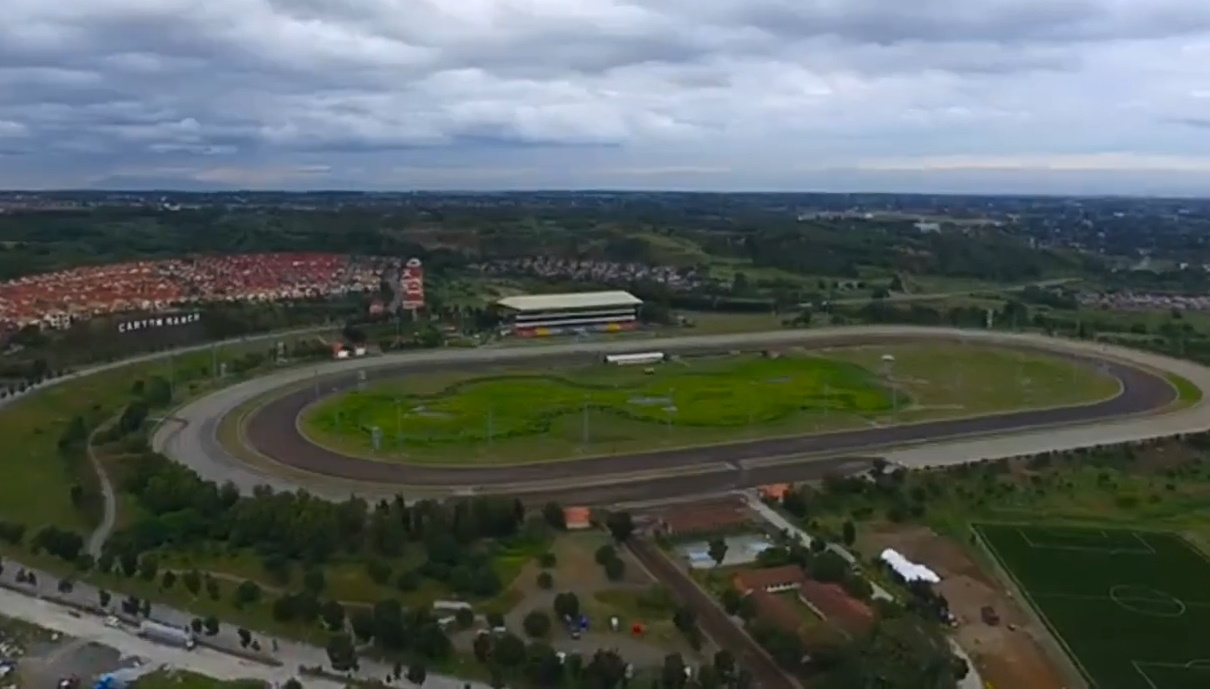
Racetrack

The San Lazaro Leisure Park was operated by the Manila Jockey Club which was formed in 1867. Originally MJC organized races at the Santa Mesa Hippodrome before establishing the San Lazaro Hippodrome in 1912 within the same city.

In 2002, MJC moved out of the San Lazaro Hippodrome. The former site was converted into a mixed-used development under the name, San Lazaro Tourism and Business Park.

The Club then transferred its racetrack to its present site in Cavite in April 1, 2003.

A grand cockpit of MJC's subdiary, Manila Cockers Club (MCC), the 2,000-seater MCC Coliseum was also constructed within the complex.

== Closure ==
In August 2022, Manila Jockey Club announced that it would stop its horse racing operations with the last races under its banner at the San Lazaro Leisure Park scheduled in October, to focus on real estate ventures while leasing existing properties.

The MJC leases its horse racing facilities in Carmona, Cavite, to The Horsemen's Track of Hapi Jockey Club Inc. (HJCI)

== See also ==
- Manila Jockey Club
- PFF National Training Centre
