= Busher (horse) =

American-bred Thoroughbred racehorse

- Sire: War Admiral
- Grandsire: Man o' War
- Dam: Baby League
- Damsire: Bubbling Over
- Sex: Filly
- Foaled: 1942
- Country: United States
- Colour: Chestnut
- Breeder: Idle Hour Stock Farm
- Owner: Col. Edward R. Bradley; Louis B. Mayer (from 1945); Elizabeth Arden (from 1947)
- Trainer: Jimmy Smith (at 2); George M. Odom (at 3)
- Record: 21: 15-3-1
- Earnings: $334,035

Major wins
- Adirondack Handicap (1944); Matron Stakes (1944); Selima Stakes (1944); Santa Susana Stakes (1945); San Vicente Stakes (1945); Santa Margarita Handicap (1945); Cleopatra Handicap (1945); Arlington Handicap (1945); Washington Park Handicap (1945); Hollywood Derby (1945); Vanity Handicap (1945); Match race with Durazna (1945)

Awards
- U.S. Champion 2-Year-Old Filly (1944); U.S. Champion 3-Year-Old Filly (1945); U.S. Champion Handicap Mare (1945); United States Horse of the Year (1945)

Honours
- United States Racing Hall of Fame (1964) #40 - Top 100 U.S. Racehorses of the 20th Century; Busher Stakes at Aqueduct Racetrack
- Last updated on October 5, 2006

Busher (1942–1955) was a thoroughbred racing filly who was a champion at ages two and three, and the American Horse of the Year in 1945. She was inducted into the National Museum of Racing and Hall of Fame in 1964. On the Blood-Horse magazine List of the Top 100 U.S. Racehorses of the 20th Century, Busher was ranked 40th.

== Background and pedigree ==
Busher was bred by Col. Edward R. Bradley's Idle Hour Stock Farm in Kentucky. She was sired by Triple Crown winner War Admiral, a son of Man o' War. Bradley had previously avoided using stallions from this sire line due to the reputation many had for being hot-blooded. However, he was convinced to make an exception, in part because War Admiral physically resembled his maternal grandsire, Sweep, a horse that Bradley had long admired. Busher's dam Baby League was by Bubbling Over, winner of the 1926 Kentucky Derby. Baby League was the third foal of one of the most influential foundation mares of the twentieth century, La Troienne.

Busher was an "exquisite" chestnut filly standing 16 hands (64 inches, 163 cm) high, noted for her intelligent head, beautiful stride and kind disposition. Bradley gave most of his horses names that started with a B — for instance, Bimelech, Black Helen, Bubbling Over, Black Toney (sire of Black Gold), Blue Larkspur, Black Servant, Behave Yourself, Burgoo King and Broker's Tip were just a few of the 128 stakes winners he bred.

== Racing career ==
In 1944 at age two, Busher raced for Bradley and was trained by former jockey Jimmy Smith. She won in her racing debut on May 30 at Belmont Park, and returned two months later to record another win by four lengths. She would normally have been moved to Saratoga for the summer race meeting but because of World War II travel restrictions, the Saratoga races were instead held at Belmont. Busher finished fourth in the Spinaway Stakes due to a poor start, but then won the Adirondack Handicap. She lost a six-furlong allowance race by a head while conceding 8 pounds to the victor Nomadic, then turned the tables with a win in the Matron Stakes with Nomadic in fourth. This was the beginning of her reputation for always getting revenge on any horse who beat her.

For her final start of the year, Busher traveled to Laurel Park where she won the Selima Stakes by three lengths. Among the horses she beat was the Gallorette, who would later become the Champion older mare on 1946. She finished the year with a record of five wins from seven starts and was named the American Champion Two-Year-Old Filly.

On December 24, 1944, the Office of War Mobilization and Reconversion announced that horse racing would be banned indefinitely because of the war effort, effective January 3, 1945. With no way of knowing when racing would resume, the aging Bradley sold much of his stock. In March 1945, Busher was sold to Louis B. Mayer for the then-large sum of $50,000. Hall of Famer Johnny Longden became her jockey and George Odom her trainer.

When racing resumed after V-E Day in May 1945, Busher won a six-furlong allowance race at Santa Anita Racetrack by five lengths. On June 2, she won the Santa Susanna Stakes by seven lengths and then on June 9 she won the San Vicente Stakes, facing colts for the first time. On June 23, she faced colts again in the Santa Anita Derby, where she was the 1-2 favorite. She had a three-length lead in the stretch but was caught at the finish line by Bymeabond. On July 4, she faced older fillies and mares for the first time in the Santa Margarita Handicap. Despite being the co-highweight at 126 pounds, she won by 1 1/2 lengths.

She then traveled to Washington Park in Chicago for the Cleopatra Handicap on July 25, winning by 4 1/2 lengths. In the Arlington Handicap on August 4, she ran at a distance of 1 1/4 miles for the first time and faced older males for the first time, but still won by 4 1/2 lengths in wire-to-wire fashion. However, she then finished third in the Beverly Handicap after being assigned 128 pounds, conceding 12 pounds to the four-year-old winner, Durazna, and 26 pounds to the runner-up, Letmeknow. A one-mile match race was then arranged between Busher and Durazna at level weights. The two battled all the way around the track, with Busher finally prevailing by 3/4 of a length.

Her next start in the Washington Park Handicap on September 3 is generally regarded as the best race of her career. The field included future Hall of Famer Armed, who was considered the top handicap horse in the country at the time. Busher tracked the early pace in third, then went to the lead at the top of the stretch and withstood a late charge by Armed to win by 1 1/2 lengths. She set a new track record of 2:01 4/5 for 1 1/4 miles.

Busher then returned to California where she lost the Will Rogers Handicap by a head to Quick Reward, to whom she conceded 11 pounds. She got her revenge in the Hollywood Derby, beating both Quick Reward and Bymeabond, who had beaten her in the Santa Anita Derby. She then won the Vanity Handicap by two lengths over older females. She finished the year with 10 wins from 13 starts, despite the war-shortened racing season. She was named the Horse of the Year, champion three-year-old filly and champion handicap mare by the Daily Racing Form. Her career earnings of $334,035 broke Top Flight's previous earnings record for fillies.

After the Vanity, Busher developed swelling in a leg, and did not race throughout 1946. She started one last time in 1947, finishing unplaced.

== Breeding career ==
On February 27, 1947, as part of a divorce settlement, Mayer auctioned all his racing stock at Santa Anita track in an event that was broadcast over three radio networks. Busher went to Neil S. McCarthy, Mayer's advisor, for $135,000, meaning Mayer essentially sold the mare to himself. In a private sale in 1948, Busher was sold for a reported $150,000 to Maine Chance Farm, owned by Mrs. Elizabeth Nightingale Graham, better known as Elizabeth Arden.

For Arden, Busher produced four fillies and one colt. None of the fillies ever raced, though three of them (Miss Busher, Popularity and Bush Pilot) would become important stakes producers. The colt was multiple stakes winner Jet Action, by 1947 Kentucky Derby winner Jet Pilot. Jet Action became the broodmare sire of My Charmer, the dam of Triple Crown winner Seattle Slew and 2000 Guineas winner Lomond. Seattle Slew was inbred to both War Admiral and Baby League through Busher and her full sister Striking.

Busher died in 1955 giving birth to another Jet Pilot foal. She is buried at the Spendthrift Farm Equine Cemetery in Lexington, Kentucky.

== Honors ==
In a poll among members of the American Trainers Association, conducted in 1955 by Delaware Park Racetrack, she was voted the sixth greatest filly in American racing history. (Gallorette was voted first.)

In 1978, Aqueduct Racetrack created the Busher Stakes in her honor. Run in late February, it is an important prep race for three-year-old fillies on the Road to the Kentucky Oaks.

Busher was inducted into the National Museum of Racing and Hall of Fame in 1964, 9 years after her death. Busher was ranked number 40 in Blood-Horse magazine List of the Top 100 U.S. Racehorses of the 20th Century. Of the 26 fillies and mares on the list, Busher ranked second, behind only the great Ruffian.

== Pedigree ==
Busher was sired by War Admiral, who won the American Triple Crown in 1937. War Admiral was sired by the great Man o' War and inherited much of his sire's racing ability. Physically though, War Admiral was on the small side and more closely resembled his dam Brushup and her sire Sweep. War Admiral led the North American sire list in 1945 and was the leading broodmare sire in 1962 and 1964. Bradley did not like horses descended from Hastings as he felt that many had bad temperaments. His bloodstock advisor, Olin Gentry, convinced him that War Admiral was an exception, pointing to his resemblance to Sweep.

Busher's dam Baby League was bred to War Admiral four times, producing Busher in 1942, Mr. Busher in 1946, Striking in 1947 and Bushleaguer in 1950. Besides Busher, Mr. Busher was the most successful racehorse but Striking proved the most successful in the breeding shed. She was named the 1961 Kentucky Broodmare of the Year after producing five stakes winners, several of whom went on to become outstanding broodmares in their own right. Striking's modern day descendants include Kentucky Derby winners Smarty Jones and Super Saver.

Baby League was a daughter of La Troienne, who, despite being winless in her own racing career in Europe, became perhaps the most important broodmare of the 20th century in the United States. She produced two Hall of Fame inductees, Black Helen and Bimelech, plus several daughters who would go on to successful breeding careers, most importantly Big Hurry, Baby League and Businesslike.

War Admiral made his greatest impact on the breed when mated to daughters of La Troienne. In addition to the four foals produced with Baby League, this cross produced Busanda (out of Businesslike) and Searching (out of Big Hurry), both of whom became highly influential producers.

Pedigree of Busher, chestnut mare, 1942
Sire War Admiral 1934	Man o' War; 1917	Fair Play	Hastings
Sire War Admiral 1934	Man o' War; 1917	Fair Play	Fairy Gold
Sire War Admiral 1934	Man o' War; 1917	Mahubah	Rock Sand
Sire War Admiral 1934	Man o' War; 1917	Mahubah	Merry Token
Sire War Admiral 1934	Brushup; 1929	Sweep	Ben Brush
Sire War Admiral 1934	Brushup; 1929	Sweep	Pink Domino
Sire War Admiral 1934	Brushup; 1929	Annette K	Harry of Hereford (GB)
Sire War Admiral 1934	Brushup; 1929	Annette K	Bathing Girl
Dam Baby League 1935	Bubbling Over; 1923	North Star III	Sunstar (GB)
Dam Baby League 1935	Bubbling Over; 1923	North Star III	Angelic
Dam Baby League 1935	Bubbling Over; 1923	Beaming Beauty	Sweep
Dam Baby League 1935	Bubbling Over; 1923	Beaming Beauty	Bellisario
Dam Baby League 1935	La Troienne; 1926	Teddy	Ajax (FR)
Dam Baby League 1935	La Troienne; 1926	Teddy	Rondeau (GB)
Dam Baby League 1935	La Troienne; 1926	Helene de Troie (FR)	Helicon (GB)
Dam Baby League 1935	La Troienne; 1926	Helene de Troie (FR)	Lady of Pedigree

- Busher was inbred 3 × 4 to Sweep, meaning Sweep appears in the 3rd generation of the sire's side of the pedigree and in the 4th generation of the dam's side.
