= Big Pebble =

American-bred Thoroughbred racehorse

- Sire: Black Servant
- Grandsire: Black Toney
- Dam: Beach Talk
- Damsire: Sundridge
- Sex: Stallion
- Foaled: 1936
- Country: United States
- Colour: Bay
- Breeder: Idle Hour Stock Farm
- Owner: Edward R. Bradley; Circle M. Ranch (1940)
- Trainer: William B. Finnegan
- Record: 41: 8-8-9
- Earnings: US$172,917

Major wins
- McLennan Handicap (1941); Widener Challenge Cup (1941); Washington Park Handicap (1941); Hollywood Gold Cup (1941)

Awards
- TSD American Champion Older Male Horse (1941)

Big Pebble (foaled 1936 in Kentucky) was an American Thoroughbred Champion racehorse.

== Background ==
Big Pebble was a bay horse bred by Edward R. Bradley at his Idle Hour Stock Farm near Lexington, Kentucky. His dam was Beach Talk and his sire was Black Servant who would also sire Blue Larkspur. Black Servant, a son of Black Toney, won the 1921 Blue Grass Stakes and was second to stablemate Behave Yourself in the 1921 Kentucky Derby.

== Racing career ==
Raced by Bradley at age two and three, Big Pebble showed little and was even used as a lead pony for Bradley's rising star, Bimelech. As such, the colt was sold in late 1939 for a mere $5,000 to Edward S. Moore of Sheridan, Wyoming. Raced in 1940 under the colors of Moore's Circle M Ranch, Big Pebble's race conditioning was taken over by William Finnegan. For his new handlers, Big Pebble developed rapidly into a contender, running a strong second to Many Stings in the March 1940 Widener Challenge Cup at Florida's Hialeah Park Race Track.

In 1941, Big Pebble was one of the top horses racing in the United States. Back at Hialeah Park for winter racing, he won a division of February's McLennan Handicap and then the prestigious Widener Challenge Cup in March. Sent to Hollywood Park Racetrack in Inglewood, California, future Hall of Fame jockey Jack Westrope rode Big Pebble to the most important win of his career in July when he defeated heavily favored Mioland in the Hollywood Gold Cup. In early September, at Washington Park Race Track near Chicago, with Jack Westrope aboard again, Big Pebble won the Washington Park Handicap. In addition to his 1941 wins, Big Pebble earned second-place finishes in the Saratoga and Whitney Handicaps.

Big Pebble's 1941 performances earned him American Champion Older Male Horse honors from Turf & Sports Digest magazine. The rival Daily Racing Form award was won by Mioland.

== Retirement and stud career ==
On November 26, 1941, owner Edward S. Moore announced that Big Pebble was being retired to stand at stud due to a bowed tendon. He was not successful as a sire.
