= La Troienne =

French-bred Thoroughbred racehorse

- Sire: Teddy
- Grandsire: Ajax
- Dam: Helene de Troie
- Damsire: Helicon
- Sex: Mare
- Foaled: 1926
- Country: France
- Colour: Bay
- Breeder: Marcel Boussac
- Owner: 1) Marcel Boussac; 2) Edward R. Bradley; 3) Greentree Stables
- Record: 7: 0-1-1
- Earnings: $146

Honours
- La Troienne Stakes at Churchill Downs
- Last updated on April 30, 2010

La Troienne (1926–1954) was one of the most famous and influential Thoroughbred broodmares in twentieth century America. She produced 10 winners including two Hall of Fame inductees while at stud, while her daughters in turn produced many notable offspring. In 2000, pedigree expert Janeen Oliver designated her as the taproot of family 1-x, a designation that was implemented by the Pedigree Online Thoroughbred Database in 2003. Recent matrilineal descendants include 2003 Horse of the Year Mineshaft, Japanese Triple Crown winner Contrail (2020), Kentucky Derby winners Smarty Jones (2004) and Super Saver (2010), Belmont Stakes winner Essential Quality (2021), and Sussex Stakes winner Alcohol Free (2021).

She was a bay filly born in 1926 in France, and was sired by the French stallion Teddy. Her dam was the winner Helene de Troie, by imported British stallion Helicon. Her breeder and first owner was Marcel Boussac.

== Racing career ==
In France, La Troienne raced twice as a two-year-old, finishing unplaced. At age three, she was unplaced in the Prix Chloé and Poule d'Essai des Pouliches. Shipped to England, she managed a third in the five furlong Snailwell Stakes at Newmarket, and a second in the Freckenham Stakes at seven furlongs. In her final start, the Welter Handicap at six furlongs, she again ran unplaced. In total, La Troienne started seven times with no wins, just one second and a third. Her earnings were equivalent to $146.

== Breeding career ==
Sent by Boussac to England to the December 1930 Newmarket Sales, she sold for 1,250 guineas. At the time, she was in foal to Chef-de-Race Gainsborough. She was purchased by Colonel E. R. Bradley of the Idle Hour Stock Farm in Lexington, Kentucky and exported to the US in 1931. The Gainsborough filly was born deformed and had to be killed.

La Troienne produced 14 named foals. Twelve raced and ten were winners, including five stakes winners and two Hall of Fame inductees.

- Black Helen (1932), a filly by Black Toney. Won four principal races, including the American Derby, the Florida Derby, the Maryland Handicap, and the Coaching Club American Oaks. Inducted into the Hall of Fame in 1991. Black Helen's offspring were not successes on the track, but her daughters went on to become prominent producers. The most notable branch of her family descends from her eleventh foal, Hula Hula by Polynesian. This branch has produced major winners in North America, Australia and New Zealand, including Kentucky Derby winner Go for Gin and champion older male Pleasant Tap.
- Biologist (1934), a gelding by Bubbling Over. Stakes winner.
- Baby League (1935), a filly by Bubbling Over. Winner of one race, she became the dam of four stakes winners: the Hall of Fame filly Busher, Mr. Busher, Striking (3 wins, including Schuylerville Stakes), and Harmonizing. Striking was named broodmare of the year in 1961, and her family is still very active. Kentucky Derby winners Smarty Jones (in 2004) and Super Saver (in 2010) both trace back to her. More recently, Striking's branch of the family produced Japanese Triple Crown winner Contrail and 2021 Belmont Stakes winner Essential Quality.
- Big Hurry (1936), a filly by Black Toney. Won four races, including the Selima Stakes, and was the dam of 10 winners including Be Fearless, Bridal Flower, The Admiral, Great Captain, and Searching. Searching also became a major producer whose family includes Kentucky Derby winner Sea Hero and the great Allez France. Other daughters of Big Hurry include: Allemande, who was the third dam of Belmont Stakes winner and Hall of Fame Champion Easy Goer; Blue Line, the fifth dam of Kentucky Oaks winner Pike Place Dancer and No Fiddling, the fourth dam of Prix du Jockey Club winner Caerleon.
- Bimelech (1937), a colt by Black Toney. Bimelech won 11 races including the Belmont and Preakness Stakes. He was a Champion at ages two and three, and was inducted into the Hall of Fame. Bimelech sired 30 stakes winners.
- Big Event (1938), a filly by Blue Larkspur. Winner and dam of stakes winner Hall of Fame.
- Businesslike (1939), a filly by Blue Larkspur. Winless, she became the dam of two stakes winners: Auditing and Busanda, who in turn became the dam of champion and leading broodmare sire Buckpasser. Her family includes Preakness Stakes winner Prairie Bayou.
- Besieged (1940), a colt by Balladier. Winner of 1 of 4 starts.
- Broke Even (1941), a colt by Blue Larkspur. Winner of 11 of 44 starts.
- Back Yard (1942), a gelding by Balladier. Unraced.
- Bee Ann Mac (1944), a filly by Blue Larkspur. Winner of the Selima Stakes.
- Belle Histoire (1945), a filly by Blue Larkspur. Winless herself, she became the dam of 8 winners, including stakes winner Royal Record.
- Belle of Troy in 1947, a filly by Blue Larkspur. Unraced, dam of stakes winner Cohoes, exported to the United Kingdom. Her family includes Breeders' Cup winner Stephanie's Kitten and major sire More Than Ready.
- Trojan War (1948) a gelding by Shut Out. Winner of two races.

Owing to the success of her descendants, La Troienne was listed as a Cluster Mare, which is a Thoroughbred brood mare that has produced two or more winners of five or more of the eight most important and valuable races, within six generations. When writing about American Classic Pedigrees in 2003, Avalyn Hunter identified six winners of American Triple Crown races descended from her in the female line: Bimelech, Personality, Easy Goer, Sea Hero, Prairie Bayou, and Go for Gin, plus four winners of similarly prominent races for fillies: Princess Rooney, Lite Light, Pike Place Dancer and Tweedside. The list has only continued to grow, including 2003 Horse of the Year Mineshaft, Kentucky Derby winners Smarty Jones and Super Saver, Japanese Triple Crown winner Contrail, plus Breeders' Cup winners Folklore, Judy the Beauty and Stephanie's Kitten. Essential Quality is both a Classic winner and a Breeders' Cup winner.

Beyond the success of her female line, La Troienne appears in the pedigrees of numerous other stakes winners, often through a form of inbreeding. One of pedigree analyst Les Brinsfield's favorite axioms was: "If a pedigree lacks La Troienne, get some in there. If it has La Troienne, get more in there." For example, La Troienne appears three times in the pedigree of 1992 Horse of the Year A.P. Indy. Leading sire Tapit is a descendant of A.P. Indy on the male side, and has an additional four strains of La Troienne from his dam, Tap Your Heels. Similarly, California Chrome, the 2014 Horse of the Year, traces to A.P. Indy on the male side, and has four additional strains of La Troienne through his dam, Love the Chase. Even American Pharoah, the 2015 Triple Crown winner, has five strains of La Troienne, in his case through grand-sire Empire Maker.

La Troienne's influence is not limited to North America. For example, she appears in the pedigrees of both Galileo and Danehill, leading sires in Great Britain and Ireland, through her great-grandson Buckpasser. The unbeaten Frankel, who descends from both Galileo and Danehill, thus has two strains of La Troienne.

La Troienne came in time to be described as "the most important producer to be brought across the Atlantic Ocean in [the twentieth] century." Pedigree expert Avalyn Hunter says she is "arguably the foremost American taproot mare of the modern era."

== Later life ==
In 1938, at the age of 13, La Troienne was frightened by a thunderstorm and due to a loss of vision in her right eye, she bolted and collided with a tree. Her right shoulder was badly damaged and the veterinarians who examined her assured Colonel Bradley she would have to be destroyed. Col. Bradley said, "Put ten men with her night and day if it will help. We'll never get another like her." At the time La Troienne was carrying the filly Businesslike.

When Col. Bradley died in 1946, his stock was sold off. A syndicate including Greentree Stables, King Ranch, and Ogden Phipps received La Troienne.

After her foaling days had ended, La Troienne lived out her life in comfort. She died at Greentree Stud at the age of 28 on January 30, 1954. Her grave still stands at Greentree, now a part of Gainesway Farm.

== Honors ==
The Grade II 7½ furlong La Troienne Stakes for 3-year-old fillies at Churchill Downs was named after her for many years, until the name was changed for the 2009 running to the Eight Belles Stakes. Somewhat fittingly, Eight Belles was a member of La Troienne's female family. Churchill Downs then renamed the Louisville Distaff Handicap, for fillies and mares 3 years old and up, in La Troienne's honour. The new La Troienne Stakes became a Grade I stake in 2014.

La Troienne never received the title of Kentucky Broodmare of the Year as her best foals raced prior to the creation of the award in 1946. However, four of her female family descendants have been so honored: Striking (1961, a noted "blue hen" in her own right), Relaxing (1989, dam of Easy Goer), Glowing Tribute (1993, dam of Sea Hero), and Prospectors Delite (2003, dam of Mineshaft).

== Pedigree ==
La Troienne was sired by Teddy, who is commonly considered the best three-year-old of 1916 in France and Spain, although his racing career was disrupted by World War I. He was the leading sire in France of 1923, and finished second in 1926, 1928 and 1932. Among his leading offspring were Bull Dog and Sir Gallahad III, who both became outstanding sires when imported into the United States. Teddy was also an outstanding broodmare sire, leading the French list in 1935. Teddy was inbred 5x3 to Bend Or and 5x4x5 to Galopin.

La Troienne's dam, Helene de Troie, also produced Adargatis, who won the Prix de Diane and herself became a Classic producer. Her dam, Lady of Pedigree, was a half sister to the notable broodmare Absurdity, who produced two Classic winners, Jest and Black Gesture. This branch of the family is also still active around the world, producing Classic winners such as Lawman and Cape Blanco. Helene de Troie was inbred 4x5 to Bend Or.

La Troienne's pedigree thus shows multiple crosses (6X4X5X6) to Bend Or, and even more crosses farther back (6X5X6X5X7) to Galopin. The first nine generations of her pedigree show fourteen crosses to Stockwell. Pedigree consultant Les Brinsfield felt that the secret to her success as a broodmare traces to the first winner of the Epsom Derby, Diomed, who had limited success at the beginning of his stud career in England but left behind the outstanding producer Young Giantess before exported to America. Young Giantess produced a thriving family and literally hundreds of crosses to her accumulated in the pedigree of La Troienne. Meanwhile, in America, Diomed established the most dominant sire line of the 19th century, including 16-time leading sire Lexington, and those sires were often inbred to Diomed. Upon arrival in North America, La Troienne was bred to stallions who descended from this male line of Diomed. Brinfield concluded, "Every foal from La Troienne was the result of the reunion of male and female strains of Diomed after segregation for over a century. Barring an error in our pedigrees, this is undeniable. Equally undeniable, these foals were superior to the norm and the cumulative impact of their offspring is astounding."

Pedigree of La Troienne (FR), bay mare, 1926
Sire Teddy b. 1913	Ajax b. 1901	Flying Fox b. 1896	Orme
Sire Teddy b. 1913	Ajax b. 1901	Flying Fox b. 1896	Vampire
Sire Teddy b. 1913	Ajax b. 1901	Amie ch. 1893	Clamart
Sire Teddy b. 1913	Ajax b. 1901	Amie ch. 1893	Alice
Sire Teddy b. 1913	Rondeau; 1900	Bay Ronald b. 1893	Hampton
Sire Teddy b. 1913	Rondeau; 1900	Bay Ronald b. 1893	Black Duchess
Sire Teddy b. 1913	Rondeau; 1900	Doremi ch. 1894	Bend Or
Sire Teddy b. 1913	Rondeau; 1900	Doremi ch. 1894	Lady Emily
Dam Helene de Troie b. 1916	Helicon b. 1908	Cyllene ch. 1895	Bona Vista
Dam Helene de Troie b. 1916	Helicon b. 1908	Cyllene ch. 1895	Arcadia
Dam Helene de Troie b. 1916	Helicon b. 1908	Vain Duchess b. 1897	Isinglass
Dam Helene de Troie b. 1916	Helicon b. 1908	Vain Duchess b. 1897	Sweet Duchess
Dam Helene de Troie b. 1916	Lady of Pedigree; 1910	St. Denis b. 1901	St. Simon
Dam Helene de Troie b. 1916	Lady of Pedigree; 1910	St. Denis b. 1901	Brooch
Dam Helene de Troie b. 1916	Lady of Pedigree; 1910	Doxa; 1901	Melton
Dam Helene de Troie b. 1916	Lady of Pedigree; 1910	Doxa; 1901	Paradoxical (family 1-s)

== See also ==
- List of racehorses
