= Black Helen =

American-bred Thoroughbred racehorse

- Sire: Black Toney
- Grandsire: Peter Pan
- Dam: La Troienne
- Damsire: Teddy
- Sex: Filly
- Foaled: 1932
- Country: United States
- Colour: Bay
- Breeder: Idle Hour Stock Farm
- Owner: Idle Hour Stock Farm
- Trainer: William A. "Bill" Hurley
- Record: 22 Starts: 15-0-2
- Earnings: $61,800

Major wins
- Florida Derby (1935); Coaching Club American Oaks (1935); American Derby (1935); Maryland Handicap (1935)

Awards
- American Champion Three-Year-Old Filly (1935)

Honours
- Black Helen Handicap at Hialeah Park; U.S. Racing Hall of Fame (1991)

Black Helen was an American Thoroughbred race horse who was named the Champion three-year-old filly of 1935 after winning eight races that year including the Coaching Club American Oaks, Florida Derby, Maryland Handicap and American Derby, becoming only the second filly to win the latter. Black Helen was inducted into the National Museum of Racing and Hall of Fame in 1991, one year after her full-brother Bimelech.

Black Helen was the first foal to race by La Troienne, later acknowledged as one of the most influential American broodmare of the twentieth century. Black Helen herself did not produce any stakes winners but several of her daughters went on to do so. Her descendants include Kentucky Derby winner Go For Gin and champions But Why Not, Princess Rooney, Pleasant Tap and Travelling Victor.

== Background ==
Black Helen was bred by Colonel Edward R. Bradley and was foaled at his Idle Hour Stock Farm in Lexington, Kentucky. In 1930, Bradley purchased a well-bred mare named La Troienne, in foal at the time to Gainsborough, for 1,250 guineas at the Newmarket sales and imported her to America. La Troienne was a homebred for the notable French breeder Marcel Boussac, but went winless in seven starts. After the Gainsborough foal died, La Troienne was bred to Bradley's foundation stallion Black Toney, a moderate racehorse known for his stamina and toughness. La Troienne was bred to Black Toney three times in all, resulting in two Hall of Fame racehorses (Black Helen and her younger brother Bimelech) and the outstanding producer Big Hurry. La Troienne produced seven other winners and seven of her daughters were stakes producers. Her female family (designated as 1-x) is one of the most successful of the twentieth century, from which numerous classic winners descend.

Black Helen was small, weighing only 900 pounds when fully grown and standing barely 15 hands (60 inches, 152 cm) high. Because she was so small, Black Helen was not nominated to enter any important two-year-old stakes races. Instead, Bradley assigned her to the farm's second string trainer, Bill Hurley.

== Racing career ==
=== 1934: two-year-old season ===
Black Helen won her first seven starts before losing her last two races at age two. Despite these losses and not being eligible for any major stakes races, she was the second-rated filly of 1934, to Nellie Flag, according to The Blood-Horse magazine.

She started racing in the Chicago area, winning two races at Washington Park in June and two at Arlington Park. She first attracted national attention when she won the West Pullman Purse at Washington Park on June 18 by four lengths. Her time of 0:59 3/5 for the five-furlong sprint was only one-fifth of a second off the track record. On July 3, she won by six lengths and set a track record at Arlington Park by running five furlongs in 0:58 2/5, leading the New York Times to call her the best juvenile filly of the season.

A throat ailment kept her from racing during the summer, but she returned on October 16 at Laurel Park, where she ran her winning streak to five when she won the Anne Arundel Purse as the heavy favorite. She pressed the early pace and then went to the lead after half a mile, eventually winning by 1 1/2 lengths. Her time of 1:11 2/5 was just a fifth of a second off the track record.

On October 23, Black Helen extended her winning streak to six in the Ellicott Purse at Laurel. "Leading from flagfall to finish", she won by two lengths despite being eased up by her jockey down the stretch. She was the shortest priced favorite of the Laurel fall meet, paying just $2.20 for a $2 bet.

On October 30, Black Helen won her seventh straight race in the Pikesville Purse at Pimlico at a distance of one mile and seventy yards. It was her first race beyond six furlongs, but she was favored at odds of 1-4. She got off to a very fast start and was never challenged, winning by three lengths.

Black Helen finished the season as the beaten favorite in both the Walden Handicap and Pimlico Handicap.

=== 1935: three-year-old season ===
In her three-year-old season, Black Helen was a sensation. After winning eight of thirteen starts, several of them against colts and older horses, she was named the 1935 American Champion Three-Year-Old Filly.

She made her first start of the season on February 27, 1935, in an allowance race at Hialeah Park Race Track, winning by two lengths in a wire-to-wire performance. Her next start was on March 9 in the Florida Derby (later renamed the Flamingo Stakes), in which she faced colts for the first time. She pressed the early pace set by Brannon, then went to the lead when challenged by Mantagna around the final turn. Down the stretch, she drew away to win by four lengths.

For her next start, Bradley nominated her to run in the Preakness Stakes where she was expected to be one of the main rivals to Kentucky Derby winner Omaha. However, he decided against entering her shortly before the race. Instead she won the Drexel Purse on opening day, May 25, at Washington Park.

She made her next start in the Coaching Club American Oaks on June 1, where she and entry-mates Bloodroot and Bird Flower were made the even money favorites in a field of thirteen. Black Helen carried 121 pounds, conceding 10 pounds to Bloodroot. The start of the race was delayed for seven minutes due to the antics of Good Gamble, earlier winner of the Acorn Stakes. When the field was finally released, Good Gamble broke inward and bumped with Black Helen. The pair then rushed up on the outside to join Bloodroot in a group behind the early pacesetter, Vicaress. When Vicaress tired after a mile, Bloodroot made her move and opened a length-and-a-half lead on Good Gamble, with Black Helen a length further back in third. In deep stretch, Black Helen cut over to the rail and closed ground to move into second, then won the race by a nose in the final strides after Bloodroot's jockey eased up on his filly. (At the time, stables with multiple horse entries declared in advance which horse was intended to win and jockeys rode accordingly.)

On June 15, Bloodroot turned the tables by winning the Prospect Purse at Washington Park, with Black Helen finishing third in her first loss of the season. On June 22, she returned in the American Derby against a top-class field of colts and old rival Nellie Flag. Black Helen went wire-to-wire to win by half a length, becoming the first female to take the American Derby since Modesty in 1884.

On July 13, Black Helen recorded her sixth win of the year in the Blackstone Purse at Arlington Park, completing nine furlongs in a time of 1:50 flat, just three-fifths off the track record. On July 21, she and Bloodroot were entered in the Arlington Classic against Omaha, the third American Triple Crown winner. The fillies "ran at him in relays" but tired to finish fourth and third respectively. Omaha set a track record in one of his most impressive performances.

Black Helen suffered several more losses during the summer, including a seventh-place finish behind Good Gamble in the Potomac Handicap and a third-place finish in the Roseland Purse at Havre de Grace. She returned to the winner's circle on October 15 in the featured race at Laurel Park. She followed up with another win in the Maryland Handicap again against colts, with Bloodroot finishing second and Good Game well beaten in fifth.

== Stud career ==
Black Helen produced no stakes winners in her long career as a broodmare, five years of which were spent at Claiborne Farm after Bradley's death. But several of her daughters did, and this meant that Black Helen's influence continues to be felt to this day. Her most important offspring include:

- Be Like Mom (1937, by Sickle) – dam of But Why Not, the American champion 3-year-old filly of 1947. Also produced three-time champion steeplechaser Oedipus. Champion Princess Rooney also descends from this branch of the family
- Broth (1938, by St. Germans) – dam of stakes winner Open Show
- Resourceful (1949, by Shut Out) – dam of The Ibex, winner of the Seneca and Stymie handicaps
- Hula Hula (1952, by Polynesian) – dam of stakes winner Hula Bend, who in turn produced George Ryder Stakes winner Hula Drum and Doncaster Handicap winner Hula Chief (by Marceau). Multiple major winners descend from this branch of the family, including Kentucky Derby winner Go for Gin, American champion older male Pleasant Tap and New Zealand 2000 Guineas winner Hulastrike
- Choosy (1954, by My Request) - dam of stakes winner Round Pearl and third dam of Canadian Horse of the Year Travelling Victor

Black Helen died at the age of 25 on August 17, 1957. She was inducted into the National Museum of Racing and Hall of Fame in 1991.

== Pedigree ==
Pedigree of Black Helen (USA), bay mare, 1932
Sire Black Toney (USA) 1911	Peter Pan (USA); 1904	Commando	Domino
Sire Black Toney (USA) 1911	Peter Pan (USA); 1904	Commando	Emma C.
Sire Black Toney (USA) 1911	Peter Pan (USA); 1904	Cinderella	Hermit
Sire Black Toney (USA) 1911	Peter Pan (USA); 1904	Cinderella	Mazurka
Sire Black Toney (USA) 1911	Belgravia (USA); 1903	Ben Brush	Bramble
Sire Black Toney (USA) 1911	Belgravia (USA); 1903	Ben Brush	Roseville
Sire Black Toney (USA) 1911	Belgravia (USA); 1903	Bonnie Gal	Galopin
Sire Black Toney (USA) 1911	Belgravia (USA); 1903	Bonnie Gal	Bonnie Doon
Dam La Troienne (FR) 1926	Teddy (FR); 1913	Ajax	Flying Fox
Dam La Troienne (FR) 1926	Teddy (FR); 1913	Ajax	Amie
Dam La Troienne (FR) 1926	Teddy (FR); 1913	Rondeau	Bay Ronald
Dam La Troienne (FR) 1926	Teddy (FR); 1913	Rondeau	Doremi
Dam La Troienne (FR) 1926	Helene de Troie (FR); 1916	Helicon	Cyllene
Dam La Troienne (FR) 1926	Helene de Troie (FR); 1916	Helicon	Vain Duchess
Dam La Troienne (FR) 1926	Helene de Troie (FR); 1916	Lady of Pedigree	St. Denis
Dam La Troienne (FR) 1926	Helene de Troie (FR); 1916	Lady of Pedigree	Doxa (Family: 1-x)
