= Bubbling Over (horse) =

American-bred Thoroughbred racehorse

- Sire: North Star
- Grandsire: Sunstar
- Dam: Beaming Beauty
- Damsire: Sweep
- Sex: Stallion
- Foaled: 1923
- Country: United States
- Color: Chestnut
- Breeder: Idle Hour Stock Farm
- Owner: Edward R. Bradley
- Trainer: Herbert J. Thompson
- Record: 13: 10-2-1
- Earnings: $78,552

Major wins
- Champagne Stakes (1925); Nursery Handicap (1925); Blue Grass Stakes (1926); American Classic Race wins: Kentucky Derby (1926)
- Last updated on October 1, 2007

Bubbling Over (1923–1938) was an American thoroughbred racehorse and sire, best known for winning the 1926 Kentucky Derby.

== Background ==
Bred in Kentucky, Bubbling Over was sired by English stakes winner North Star out of the mare Beaming Beauty, who in turn was sired by Belmont Stakes winner Sweep. He was owned by Colonel Bradley of Idle Hour Stock Farm.

== Racing career ==
Bubbling Over was never out of the money in 13 starts. In a year when the Preakness Stakes was run before the Kentucky Derby (May 10 and May 15, respectively), Bubbling Over, who did not enter the 1926 Preakness Stakes, won the 1926 Kentucky Derby. He ran first in a field of 13, winning by five lengths over second-place finisher Bagenbaggage, with a time of 2:03 4/5. Bubbling Over did not race again, due to lameness.

== Retirement ==
Upon retirement, Bubbling Over was very successful not only as a sire but as a broodmare sire. Among his progeny were Kentucky Derby winner Burgoo King; Baby League, dam of Striking, 1961 Broodmare of the Year; Hildene, dam of Preakness Stakes winner Hill Prince; and stakes winner Biologist. Baby League was also the dam of Busher, a filly who was the 1945 Horse of the Year.

Bubbling Over died in 1938 and is buried at Darby Dan Farm in Lexington, Kentucky.

== Sire line tree ==
- Bubbling Over
  - Burgoo King
    - Be Fearless

== Pedigree ==
Pedigree of Bubbling Over (USA), chestnut stallion, 1923
Sire North Star (GB) 1914	Sunstar (GB); 1908	Sundridge	Amphion
Sire North Star (GB) 1914	Sunstar (GB); 1908	Sundridge	Sierra
Sire North Star (GB) 1914	Sunstar (GB); 1908	Doris	Loved One
Sire North Star (GB) 1914	Sunstar (GB); 1908	Doris	Lauretta
Sire North Star (GB) 1914	Angelic (GB); 1901	St Angelo	Galopin
Sire North Star (GB) 1914	Angelic (GB); 1901	St Angelo	Agneta
Sire North Star (GB) 1914	Angelic (GB); 1901	Fota	Hampton
Sire North Star (GB) 1914	Angelic (GB); 1901	Fota	Photina
Dam Beaming Beauty (USA) 1917	Sweep (USA); 1907	Ben Brush	Bramble
Dam Beaming Beauty (USA) 1917	Sweep (USA); 1907	Ben Brush	Roseville
Dam Beaming Beauty (USA) 1917	Sweep (USA); 1907	Pink Domino	Domino*^
Dam Beaming Beauty (USA) 1917	Sweep (USA); 1907	Pink Domino	Belle Rose
Dam Beaming Beauty (USA) 1917	Bellisario (USA); 1911	Hippodrome	Commando^
Dam Beaming Beauty (USA) 1917	Bellisario (USA); 1911	Hippodrome	Dominoes^
Dam Beaming Beauty (USA) 1917	Bellisario (USA); 1911	Biturica	Hamburg
Dam Beaming Beauty (USA) 1917	Bellisario (USA); 1911	Biturica	Berriedale (Family 8-h)

*^ Bubbling Over is inbred 4D x 5D x 5D to the stallion Domino, meaning that he appears fourth generation once and fifth generation twice (via Commando and Dominoes)^ on the dam side of his pedigree.

== Sources ==
- Pedigree & Partial Stats
- Darby Dan Farm
