= Peter Pan (American horse) =

American-bred Thoroughbred racehorse

Peter Pan I
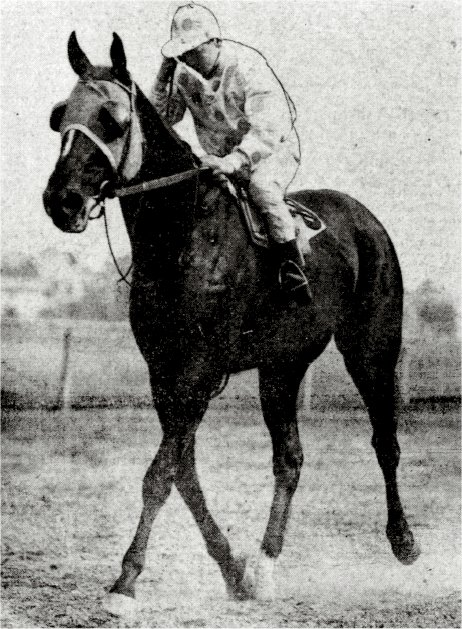
- Peter Pan in 1907.
- Sire: Commando
- Grandsire: Domino
- Dam: Cinderella
- Damsire: Hermit
- Sex: Stallion
- Foaled: 1904
- Country: United States
- Colour: Bay
- Breeder: James R. Keene
- Owner: James R. Keene
- Trainer: James G. Rowe Sr.
- Record: 17: 10–3–1
- Earnings: $115,450

Major wins
- Hopeful Stakes (1906); Flash Stakes (1906); Advance Stakes (1907); Brighton Handicap (1907); Tidal Stakes (1907); Brooklyn Derby (1907) Triple Crown Race wins: Belmont Stakes (1907)

Awards
- United States Champion 3-Yr-Old Colt (1907)

Honours
- United States Racing Hall of Fame (1956); Peter Pan Stakes at Belmont Park
- Last updated on April 1, 2010

Peter Pan (1904–1933) was an American Thoroughbred racehorse and sire, bred and raced by prominent horseman James R. Keene. As winner of the Belmont Stakes, the Brooklyn Derby, and the Brighton Handicap, he was inducted into the National Museum of Racing and Hall of Fame. His progeny included many famous American racehorses, including several winners of the Kentucky Derby and the Preakness Stakes.

== Background ==
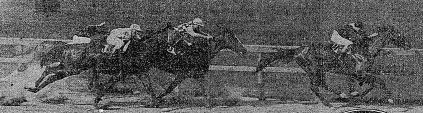
Peter Pan (2nd from left) making his stretch run to win the 1907 Brighton Handicap.

Bred and raced by prominent horseman James R. Keene, Peter Pan was out of the mare Cinderella, whose sire was Hermit, the 1867 winner of England's most important race, The Derby. Peter Pan was sired by Commando, a 1901 American Classic Race winner who in turn was a son of Domino, the American Horse of the Year of 1893.

Peter Pan was conditioned by future Hall of Fame trainer James G. Rowe Sr.

== Racing career ==
At age 2, Peter Pan won four of his eight starts including the prestigious 1906 Hopeful Stakes.

In 1907, Peter Pan won six of his nine starts with two seconds, one of which was in the spring in the Withers Stakes. As the prestigious U.S. Triple Crown of Thoroughbred Racing had not at that time been established, the 3-year-old Peter Pan was not entered in the Kentucky Derby or the Preakness Stakes. However, he won the then 1 3/8 miles (2.2 km) Belmont Stakes, a race that is now the third leg of the Triple Crown series. In winning the Belmont, he defeated Frank Gill, who had beaten him in the Withers Stakes. In 1907, Peter Pan also won the important Brooklyn Derby and the Standard Stakes at Gravesend Race Track as well as the Advance and the Tidal Stakes at Sheepshead Bay Race Track. Shortly after winning the Brighton Handicap, he suffered a tendon injury and was retired to stallion duty at his owner's Castelton Stud. In a review of Peter Pan's win in the 1907 Brighton Handicap in front of 40,000 fans, the New York Telegraph was quoted as saying the horse "accomplished a task that completely overshadowed any previous 3-year-old performance in turf history."

=== Honors ===
Following its creation, Peter Pan was inducted in the National Museum of Racing and Hall of Fame in 1956, as were his sire Commando and grandsire Domino plus his granddaughter Top Flight.

== Stud record ==
Peter Pan stood at his owner's Castleton Stud in Lexington, Kentucky, then was sold for US$100,000 in 1912 to a breeding farm in France. Brought back to the United States, he was sold to Harry Payne Whitney and stood at Brookdale Farm in Lincroft, New Jersey, until 1915, when he became the foundation sire for the new Whitney Farm in Lexington, Kentucky.

Peter Pan died in December 1933 at the age of twenty-nine and was buried at the Whitney Farm in Lexington (now part of the Gainesway Farm).

== Progeny ==
Peter Pan's progeny includes:

- Black Toney (1911) – Foundation sire for Idle Hour Stock Farm, among the U.S. top twenty sires on ten occasions
- Pennant – sire of Hall of Fame inductees Equipoise & Jolly Roger / 1924 U.S. Co-Champion Two Year Old Filly Maud Muller / 1938 Preakness Stakes winner Dauber
- Puss In Boots (1913) – 1915 U.S. Champion Two Year Old Filly
- Vexatious (1916) – 1919 Champion Three Year Old Filly
- Prudery (1918) – 1920 U.S. Champion Two Year Old Filly & 1921 Champion Three Year Old Filly
- Tryster (1918) – U.S. Champion Two Year Old Colt

Damsire of notable horses such as:

- Bostonian (1924) – won 1927 Preakness Stakes
- Whiskery (1924) – won 1927 Kentucky Derby, Champion Three Year Old Colt
- Victorian (1925) – won 1928 Preakness Stakes
- Top Flight (1929) – U.S. Racing Hall of Fame inductee, 1931 U.S. Champion Two Year Old Filly & 1932 Champion Three Year Old Filly

Grandsire of notable horses such as:

- Black Gold (1921) – Hall of Fame inductee, 1924 Kentucky Derby winner
- Equipoise (1928–1938) – National Museum of Racing and Hall of Fame inductee, Two Time Horse of the Year (1932,1933)
- Brokers Tip (1930) – 1933 Kentucky Derby winner
- Bimelech (1937) – Hall of Fame inductee, 1940 Preakness and Belmont Stakes winner

== Sire line tree ==
- Peter Pan
  - Black Toney
    - Black Servant
      - Blue Larkspur
        - Boxthorn
        - Skylarking
        - Blue Flyer
        - Best Seller
        - Crowfoot
        - Blue Swords
        - Revoked
        - Three Rings
        - Oedipus
        - Blue Gay
        - Hawley
      - Big Pebble
    - Beau Butler
    - Black Gold
    - Broadway Jones
    - Black Panther
    - Brokers Tip
      - Market Wise
        - To Market
        - Wise Margin
    - Balladier
      - Bold And Bad
        - Bold Minstrel
      - Spy Song
        - Duc de Fer
        - Royal Note
        - Crimson Satan
      - Double Jay
        - Tick Tock
        - Bagdad
        - Jay Fox
        - Noble Jay
        - Sunrise Flight
        - Bupers
        - Repeating
        - Spring Double
        - Rose Argent
        - Honey Jay
      - Mr Music
        - Mr Jive
    - Bimelech
      - Brookfield
        - Invigorator
      - Burning Dream
      - Bymeabond
      - Blue Border
      - Better Self
        - Time Tested
      - Guillotine
      - Bassanio
      - Bradley
      - Hilarious
        - Fast Hilarious
      - Torch Of War
      - Jabneh
      - Laugh
      - Getthere Jack
  - Pennant
    - Bunting
    - Jolly Roger
    - Valorous
    - Equipoise
      - Attention
      - Equestrian
        - Stymie
        - Flying Missel
        - Top Deck
      - Bolingbroke
      - Swing And Sway
        - Saggy
        - Fluctuate
      - Shut Out
        - One Hitter
        - Hall Of Fame
        - Closed Door
        - Social Outcast
    - Red Rain
    - Dauber
    - The Chief
    - Maeda
      - Delegate
  - Tryster
  - Laurano
  - Croyden
  - Macaw
  - Captain Kettle
  - Peter Hastings
    - Petrose
      - Pet Bully

== Pedigree ==
Pedigree of Peter Pan, bay stallion, 1904
Sire Commando	Domino	Himyar	Alarm
Sire Commando	Domino	Himyar	Hira
Sire Commando	Domino	Mannie Gray	Enquirer
Sire Commando	Domino	Mannie Gray	Lizzie G
Sire Commando	Emma C	Darebin	The Peer
Sire Commando	Emma C	Darebin	Lurline
Sire Commando	Emma C	Guenn	Flood
Sire Commando	Emma C	Guenn	Glendew
Dam Cinderella	Hermit	Newminster	Touchstone
Dam Cinderella	Hermit	Newminster	Beeswing
Dam Cinderella	Hermit	Seclusion	Tadmor
Dam Cinderella	Hermit	Seclusion	Miss Sellon
Dam Cinderella	Mazurka	See Saw	Buccaneer
Dam Cinderella	Mazurka	See Saw	Margery Daw
Dam Cinderella	Mazurka	Mabille	Parmesan
Dam Cinderella	Mazurka	Mabille	Rigolboche (family: 2-o)

== See also ==
- List of racehorses
