= 1926 Preakness Stakes =

51st running of the Preakness Stakes

51st Preakness Stakes
- The Preakness Stakes
- Location: Pimlico Race Course, Baltimore, Maryland, United States
- Date: May 10, 1926
- Winning horse: Display
- Jockey: John Maiben
- Trainer: T. J. Healey
- Owner: Walter J. Salmon Sr.
- Conditions: Fast
- Surface: Dirt

The 1926 Preakness Stakes was the 51st running of the $63,625 Preakness Stakes Thoroughbred horse race. The race took place on May 10, 1926, and was run before the Kentucky Derby. Ridden by John Maiben, in a major upset Display won the race by a head over runner-up Blondin. The race was run on a track rated fast in a final time of 1:59 4/5

== Payout ==
The 51st Preakness Stakes Payout Schedule

Program Number	Horse Name	Win	Place	Show
3	Display	$40.70	$20.40	$11.20
6	Blondin	-	$6.50	$5.10
5	Mars			$10.40

== The full chart ==
Daily Racing Form Chart

Finish Position	Margin (lengths)	Post Position	Horse name	Jockey	Trainer	Owner	Post Time Odds	Purse Earnings
1st	0	4	Display	John Maiben	T. J. Healey	Walter J. Salmon Sr.	19.05-1	$53,625
2nd	HD	10	Blondin	Pete Walls	James G. Rowe Sr.	Harry P. Whitney	5.25-1	$5,000
3rd	1	7	Mars	Harry Richards	Scott P. Harlan	Walter J. Salmon Sr.	19.20-1	$3,000
4th	4	12	Dress Parade	Albert Johnson	George Conway	Glen Riddle Farm Stable	10.45-1	$2,000
5th	2	9	Light Carbine	Willie Munden	Michael Joseph Dunleavy	Ira B. Humphreys	50.65-1	
6th	31/2	2	Canter	Clarence Turner	Harry Rites	J. Edwin Griffith	3.15-1	
7th	2	11	Color Sergeant	Linus McAtee	James G. Rowe Sr.	Harry P. Whitney	5.25-1	
8th	HD	1	Bagenbaggage	Eric Blind	William A. Hurley	Idle Hour Stock Farm Stable	4.40-1	
9th	4	5	Nichavo	Laverne Fator	Sam Hildreth	Rancocas Stable	17.75-1	
10th	11/2	3	Rock Man	Frank Coltiletti	Joseph H. Stotler	Sagamore Stable	8.80-1	
11th	2	8	Navigator	George Ellis	Clyde Phillips	Greentree Stable	15.25-1	
12th	3	6	Timmara	W. Smith	John O. Burttschell	T. W. O'Brien	33.35-1	
13th	8	6	Banton	Fred Weiner	Albert B. (Alex) Gordon	Albert B. (Alex) Gordon	50.25-1	

- Winning Breeder: Walter J. Salmon Sr.; (KY)
- Times: 1/4 mile – 0:23 2/5; 1/2 mile – 47 3/5; 3/4 mile – 1:13 flat; mile – 1:38 4/5; 1 3/16 (final) – 1:59 4/5
- Track Condition: Fast
