= Black Toney =

American-bred Thoroughbred racehorse

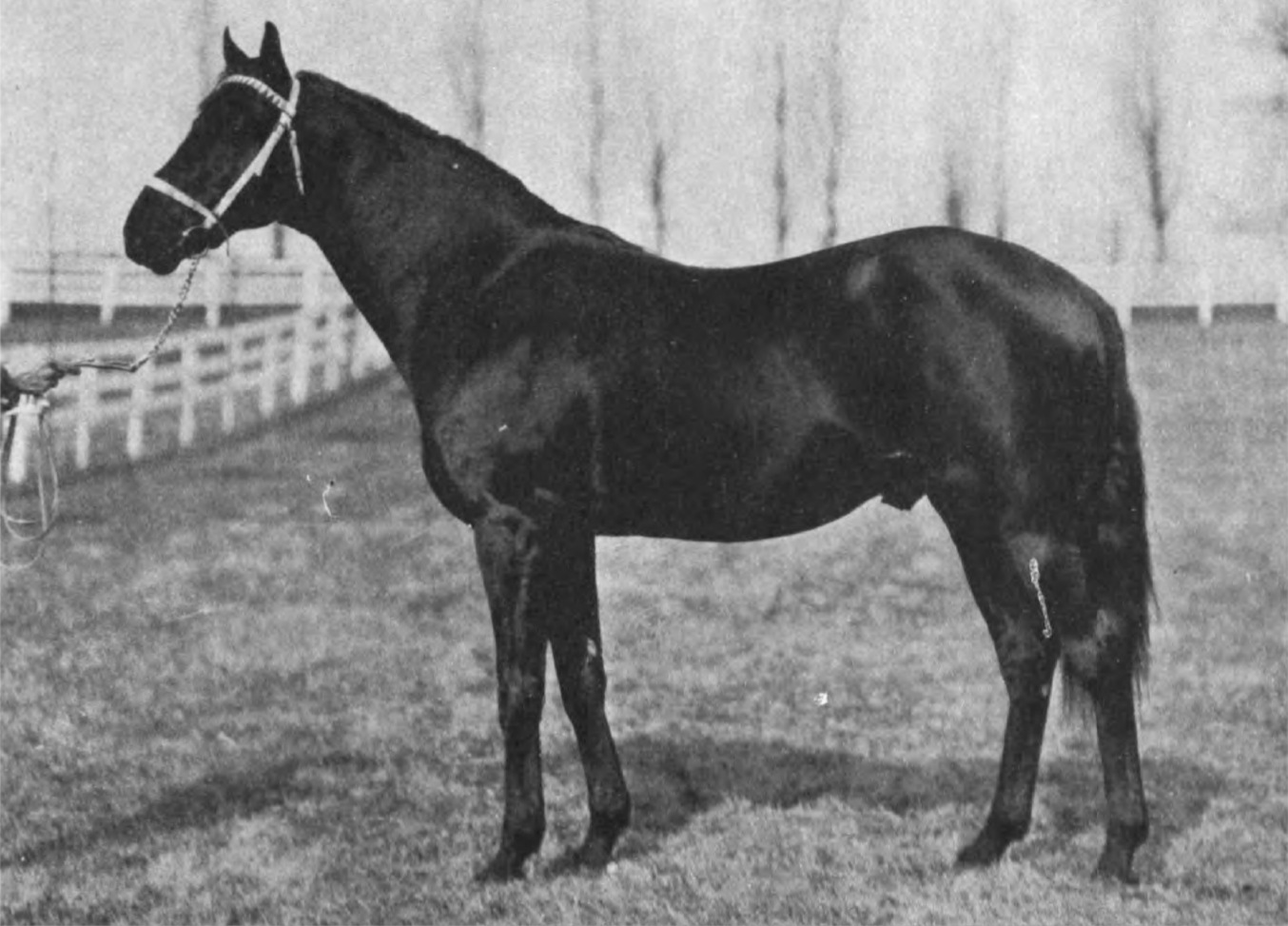
- Black Toney
- Sire: Peter Pan
- Grandsire: Commando
- Dam: Belgravia
- Damsire: Ben Brush
- Sex: Stallion
- Foaled: 1911
- Country: United States
- Colour: Brown
- Breeder: James R. Keene
- Owner: Colonel Edward R. Bradley
- Trainer: Herbert J. Thompson
- Record: 40: 13-11-7
- Earnings: $13,565

Major wins
- Valuation Stakes (1913); Latonia Independence Handicap (1914)

Honours
- Leading Juvenile Sire in 1939; Among the top 20 American sires by earnings ten times. The Black Toney Purse once run at Latonia Race Track
- Last updated on December 6, 2007

Black Toney (1911–1938) was an American Thoroughbred racehorse and sire, owned and raced by Edward R. Bradley.

== Background ==
Black Toney was bred by James R. Keene's Castleton Lyons Farm. Keene, whose health was failing (he died in 1913), sold all his holdings in 1912 to Colonel Edward R. Bradley's Idle Hour Stock Farm in Lexington, Kentucky. Some confusion occurred over this sale, and Bradley resold most of the lot, but he kept a very dark brown yearling he named Black Toney. The price tag for the son of future Hall of Famer Peter Pan, whose sire was another future Hall of Famer, Commando, by Domino, was $1,600. Black Toney's dam was Belgravia, the best daughter of future Hall of Famer Ben Brush. This meant that the almost-black yearling with no white markings and a fine head and body was a member of the last crop bred by Keene from his famous Domino/Ben Brush cross.

== Racing career ==
Black Toney raced for four years, coming in the money in 31 of his 40 starts.

== Stud record ==
Black Toney became a very successful breeding stallion, siring many of the horses for which the Idle Hour Stock Farm became famous. The names of Bradley's horses all began with a "B," a quirk of Bradley's, often attributed to his first stakes winner, Bad News. Bad News earned his name because, according to Bradley, "bad news travels fast."

Bradley bred him sparingly and yet, even from 21 small crops and a total of 221 foals, the quality of his get was very high. Overall, he sired 40 stakes winners, which amounts to 18 percent of his foals. Black Toney was 10 times among the top 20 American sires by earnings. He was second on the general sire list in 1933 and fifth in 1939.

Black Toney spent his whole stud career at Idle Hour, producing many fine broodmares as well as winners. He died there on September 19, 1938, at the age of 27 of an apparent heart attack. Colonel Bradley commissioned a bronze statue that he placed over his greatest stallion's grave. It is still there today, on a part of the Darby Dan Farm.

The best of his offspring included:

- Miss Jemima - American Champion Two-Year-Old Filly, 1919
- Black Servant - Second in the 1921 Kentucky Derby, sire of Blue Larkspur, Big Pebble, Baba Kenny Champion Two-Year-Old Filly of 1930, Barn Swallow won 1933 Kentucky Oaks
- Black Gold - U. S. Racing Hall of Fame
- Bimelech - American Champion Colt at two and three, U.S. Racing Hall of Fame inductee
- Brokers Tip - 1933 Kentucky Derby winner
- Balladier- American Champion Two-Year-Colt of 1934, sire of Spy Song
- Black Maria - 1926 American Champion Three-Year-Old Filly, 1927 and 1928 American Champion Older Female Horse
- Black Helen - 1935 American Champion Three-Year-Old Filly, U.S. Racing Hall of Fame
- Big Hurry - the dam of Searching and Bridal Flower Champion Three-Year-Old Filly of 1946
- Bridal Colors - dam of Relic
- Crotala - dam of the leading broodmare Boat

== Sire line tree ==
- Black Toney
  - Black Servant
    - Blue Larkspur
      - Boxthorn
      - Skylarking
      - Blue Flyer
      - Best Seller
      - Crowfoot
        - Jamie K
        - Easy Spur
      - Blue Swords
        - Blue Man
        - Blue Volt
      - Revoked
        - Rejected
        - Reneged
      - Three Rings
      - Oedipus
      - Blue Gay
      - Hawley
    - Big Pebble
  - Beau Butler
  - Black Gold
  - Broadway Jones
  - Black Panther
  - Brokers Tip
    - Market Wise
      - To Market
        - High Bid
        - Oink
        - Viking Spirit
        - Hurry to Market
        - Rising Market
      - Wise Margin
  - Balladier
    - Bold And Bad
      - Bold Minstrel
    - Spy Song
      - Duc de Fer
        - Bon Nouvel
      - Royal Note
        - Little Tumbler
        - Forgotten Dreams
      - Crimson Satan
        - Oil Power
        - Whitesburg
        - Brilliant Sandy
        - Play the Red
    - Double Jay
      - Tick Tock
      - Bagdad
        - Drin
        - Old Bag
        - Saber Mountain
        - Fiddle Isle
        - Tarboosh
      - Jay Fox
      - Noble Jay
        - Tan Jay
      - Sunrise Flight
      - Bupers
      - Repeating
      - Spring Double
        - Deux Coup
        - Double Reefed
        - Traveling Music
      - Rose Argent
        - Gusty O'Shay
      - Honey Jay
    - Mr Music
      - Mr Jive
  - Bimelech
    - Brookfield
      - Invigorator
    - Burning Dream
    - Bymeabond
    - Blue Border
    - Better Self
      - Time Tested
        - Az Igazi
    - Guillotine
    - Bassanio
    - Bradley
    - Hilarious
      - Fast Hilarious
        - Hail Hilarious
    - Torch Of War
    - Jabneh
    - Laugh
    - Getthere Jack

== Pedigree ==
Pedigree of Black Toney, brown stallion, 1911
Sire Peter Pan	Commando	Domino	Himyar
Sire Peter Pan	Commando	Domino	Mannie Gray
Sire Peter Pan	Commando	Emma C	Darebin
Sire Peter Pan	Commando	Emma C	Guenn
Sire Peter Pan	Cinderella	Hermit	Newminster
Sire Peter Pan	Cinderella	Hermit	Seclusion
Sire Peter Pan	Cinderella	Mazurka	See Saw
Sire Peter Pan	Cinderella	Mazurka	Mabille
Dam Belgravia	Ben Brush	Bramble	Bonnie Scotland*
Dam Belgravia	Ben Brush	Bramble	Ivy Leaf
Dam Belgravia	Ben Brush	Roseville	Reform
Dam Belgravia	Ben Brush	Roseville	Albia
Dam Belgravia	Bonnie Gal	Galopin	Vedette
Dam Belgravia	Bonnie Gal	Galopin	Flying Duchess
Dam Belgravia	Bonnie Gal	Bonnie Doon	Rapid Rhone
Dam Belgravia	Bonnie Gal	Bonnie Doon	Queen Mary* (family: 10-c)

* Black Toney is inbred 5D x 4D to the mare Queen Mary, meaning that she appears fifth generation (via Bonnie Scotland) and fourth generation on the dam side of his pedigree.
