= American Champion Three-Year-Old Male Horse =

Award for American racehorses

The American Champion Three-Year-Old Male Horse is an American Thoroughbred horse racing honor awarded annually in Thoroughbred flat racing. It became part of the Eclipse Awards program in 1971.

The award originated in 1936 when Turf & Sports Digest (TSD) and Daily Racing Form (DRF) began naming an annual champion. Starting in 1950, the Thoroughbred Racing Associations (TRA) began naming its champion. The following list provides the name of the horses chosen by these organizations. The only disagreement came in 1968, when Turf & Sports Digest named Forward Pass as champion whereas the other two organizations voted for Stage Door Johnny.

Champions from 1871 through 1935 were selected retrospectively by a panel of experts as published by The Blood-Horse magazine.

There were co-champions chosen retrospectively for 1876, 1882, 1885, 1886, 1888, 1893, 1894, 1904, 1906, 1917, 1923, and 1932.

The Daily Racing Form, the Thoroughbred Racing Associations, and the National Turf Writers Association all joined forces in 1971 to create the Eclipse Award.

As of 2021, Bob Baffert won the award 10 times as a trainer. No other trainer won the award more than twice.

== Honorees ==
=== Eclipse Awards ===
| Year | Horse | Trainer | Owner |
|---|---|---|---|
| 2025 | Sovereignty | William I. Mott | Godolphin |
| 2024 | Sierra Leone | Chad Brown | Derrick Smith, Ms. John Magnier, Michael Tabor, Westerburg, Brook T. Smith and Peter Brant |
| 2023 | Arcangelo | Jena Antonucci | Blue Rose Farm |
| 2022 | Epicenter | Steve Asmussen | Winchell Thoroughbreds |
| 2021 | Essential Quality | Brad H. Cox | Godolphin |
| 2020 | Authentic | Bob Baffert | Spendthrift Farm, MyRaceHorse Stable, Madaket Stables, and Starlight Racing |
| 2019 | Maximum Security | Jason Servis | Mary & Gary West |
| 2018 | Justify | Bob Baffert | China Horse Club, Head of Plains Partners, Starlight Racing 7 WinStar Farm |
| 2017 | West Coast | Bob Baffert | Mary & Gary West |
| 2016 | Arrogate | Bob Baffert | Juddmonte Farms |
| 2015 | American Pharoah | Bob Baffert | Zayat Stables |
| 2014 | California Chrome | Art Sherman | Steven Coburn, Perry Martin |
| 2013 | Will Take Charge | D. Wayne Lukas | Willis D. Horton |
| 2012 | I'll Have Another | Doug F. O'Neill | J. Paul Reddam |
| 2011 | Animal Kingdom | H. Graham Motion | Team Valor |
| 2010 | Lookin At Lucky | Bob Baffert | Mike Pegram, Karl Watson & Paul Weitman |
| 2009 | Summer Bird | Tim Ice | Dr. K. K. & Dr. V. Devi Jayaraman |
| 2008 | Big Brown | Richard E. Dutrow Jr. | IEAH Stables & Paul Pompa Jr. |
| 2007 | Curlin | Steve Asmussen | Stonestreet Stables et al. |
| 2006 | Bernardini | Thomas Albertrani | Darley Stable |
| 2005 | Afleet Alex | Timothy F. Ritchey | Cash Is King Stable |
| 2004 | Smarty Jones | John Servis | Roy & Patricia Chapman |
| 2003 | Funny Cide | Barclay Tagg | Sackatoga Stable |
| 2002 | War Emblem | Bob Baffert | R. L. Reineman/The Thoroughbred Corp. |
| 2001 | Point Given | Bob Baffert | The Thoroughbred Corp. |
| 2000 | Tiznow | Jay M. Robbins | Michael Cooper & Cecilia Straub-Rubens |
| 1999 | Charismatic | D. Wayne Lukas | Bob & Beverly Lewis |
| 1998 | Real Quiet | Bob Baffert | Michael E. Pegram |
| 1997 | Silver Charm | Bob Baffert | Bob & Beverly Lewis |
| 1996 | Skip Away | Sonny Hine | Carolyn Hine |
| 1995 | Thunder Gulch | D. Wayne Lukas | Michael Tabor |
| 1994 | Holy Bull | Warren A. Croll Jr. | Warren A. Croll Jr. |
| 1993 | Prairie Bayou | Thomas Bohannan | Loblolly Stable |
| 1992 | A.P. Indy | Neil D. Drysdale | Tomonori Tsurumaki |
| 1991 | Hansel | Frank L. Brothers | Lazy Lane Farm |
| 1990 | Unbridled | Carl Nafzger | Frances A. Genter |
| 1989 | Sunday Silence | Charles E. Whittingham | H-G-W Partners |
| 1988 | Risen Star | Louie Roussel III | Ronnie Lamarque & Louie Roussel III |
| 1987 | Alysheba | Jack Van Berg | Dorothy & Pamela Scharbauer |
| 1986 | Snow Chief | Melvin F. Stute | Carl Grinstead & Ben Rochelle |
| 1985 | Spend A Buck | Cam Gambolati | Hunter Farm |
| 1984 | Swale | Woody Stephens | Claiborne Farm |
| 1983 | Slew o' Gold | Sidney Watters Jr. | Equusequity Stable |
| 1982 | Conquistador Cielo | Woody Stephens | Henryk de Kwiatkowski |
| 1981 | Pleasant Colony | John P. Campo | Buckland Farm |
| 1980 | Temperence Hill | Joseph B. Cantey | Loblolly Stable |
| 1979 | Spectacular Bid | Bud Delp | Hawksworth Farm |
| 1978 | Affirmed | Laz Barrera | Harbor View Farm |
| 1977 | Seattle Slew | William H. Turner Jr. | Karen & Mickey Taylor |
| 1976 | Bold Forbes | Laz Barrera | Estéban Rodriguez Tizol |
| 1975 | Wajima | Stephen A. DiMauro | East-West Stable |
| 1974 | Little Current | Lou Rondinello | Darby Dan Farm |
| 1973 | Secretariat | Lucien Laurin | Meadow Stable |
| 1972 | Key to the Mint | J. Elliott Burch | Rokeby Stables |
| 1971 | Canonero II | Juan Arias | Pedro Baptista |

=== Daily Racing Form, Turf & Sport Digest and Thoroughbred Racing Association Awards ===
| Year | Horse | Trainer | Owner |
|---|---|---|---|
| 1970 | Personality | John W. Jacobs | Ethel D. Jacobs |
| 1969 | Arts and Letters | J. Elliott Burch | Rokeby Stables |
| 1968 | Stage Door Johnny (TRA) (DRF) | John M. Gaver Sr. | Greentree Stable |
| 1968 | Forward Pass (TSD) | Henry Forrest | Calumet Farm |
| 1967 | Damascus | Frank Y. Whiteley Jr. | Edith W. Bancroft |
| 1966 | Buckpasser | Edward A. Neloy | Ogden Phipps |
| 1965 | Tom Rolfe | Frank Y. Whiteley Jr. | Powhatan Stable |
| 1964 | Northern Dancer | Horatio Luro | Windfields Farm |
| 1963 | Chateaugay | James P. Conway | Darby Dan Farm |
| 1962 | Jaipur | Winbert F. Mulholland | George D. Widener Jr. |
| 1961 | Carry Back | Jack A. Price | Katherine Price |
| 1960 | Kelso | Carl Hanford | Bohemia Stable |
| 1959 | Sword Dancer | J. Elliott Burch | Brookmeade Stable |
| 1958 | Tim Tam | Horace A. Jones | Calumet Farm |
| 1957 | Bold Ruler | James E. Fitzsimmons | Wheatley Stable |
| 1956 | Needles | Hugh L. Fontaine | D & H Stable |
| 1955 | Nashua | James E. Fitzsimmons | Belair Stud |
| 1954 | High Gun | Max Hirsch | King Ranch |
| 1953 | Native Dancer | William C. Winfrey | Alfred G. Vanderbilt II |
| 1952 | One Count | Oscar White | Sarah F. Jeffords |
| 1951 | Counterpoint | Sylvester Veitch | Cornelius Vanderbilt Whitney |
| 1950 | Hill Prince | Casey Hayes | Meadow Stud, Inc. |

=== Daily Racing Form and Turf & Sport Digest Awards ===
| Year | Horse | Trainer | Owner |
|---|---|---|---|
| 1949 | Capot | John M. Gaver Sr. | Greentree Stable |
| 1948 | Citation | Ben A. Jones | Calumet Farm |
| 1947 | Phalanx | Sylvester Veitch | Cornelius Vanderbilt Whitney |
| 1946 | Assault | Max Hirsch | King Ranch |
| 1945 | Fighting Step | Charles C. Norman | Murlogg Farm |
| 1944 | By Jimminy | James W. Smith | Alfred P. Parker |
| 1943 | Count Fleet | Don Cameron | Fannie Hertz |
| 1942 | Alsab | Sarge Swenke | Albert Sabath |
| 1941 | Whirlaway | Ben A. Jones | Calumet Farm |
| 1940 | Bimelech | William A. Hurley | Idle Hour Stock Farm |
| 1939 | Challedon | Louis J. Schaefer | Branncastle Farm |
| 1938 | Stagehand | Earl Sande | Col. Maxwell Howard |
| 1937 | War Admiral | George Conway | Glen Riddle Farm |
| 1936 | Granville | James E. Fitzsimmons | William Woodward Sr. |

=== The Blood-Horse retrospective champions ===
| Year | Horse | Trainer | Owner |
|---|---|---|---|
| 1935 | Omaha | James E. Fitzsimmons | Belair Stud |
| 1934 | Cavalcade | Robert Augustus Smith | Brookmeade Stable |
| 1933 | Head Play | Willie Crump | Suzanne Mason |
| 1932 | Burgoo King ‡ | Herbert J. Thompson | Edward R. Bradley |
| 1932 | Faireno ‡ | James E. Fitzsimmons | Belair Stud |
| 1931 | Twenty Grand | James G. Rowe Jr. | Greentree Stable |
| 1930 | Gallant Fox | James E. Fitzsimmons | Belair Stud |
| 1929 | Blue Larkspur | Herbert J. Thompson | Edward R. Bradley |
| 1928 | Reigh Count | Bert S. Michell | Fannie Hertz |
| 1927 | Whiskery | Fred Hopkins | Harry Payne Whitney |
| 1926 | Crusader | George Conway | Glen Riddle Farm |
| 1925 | American Flag | Gwyn R. Tompkins | Glen Riddle Farm |
| 1924 | Sarazen | Max Hirsch | Virginia Fair Vanderbilt |
| 1923 | Zev ‡ | David J. Leary | Rancocas Stable |
| 1923 | In Memoriam ‡ | George Land | Carl Weidemann |
| 1922 | Whiskaway | James G. Rowe Sr. | Harry Payne Whitney |
| 1921 | Grey Lag | Sam Hildreth | Rancocas Stable |
| 1920 | Man o' War | Louis Feustel | Samuel D. Riddle |
| 1919 | Sir Barton | H. Guy Bedwell | J. K. L. Ross |
| 1918 | Johren | James G. Rowe Sr. | Harry Payne Whitney |
| 1917 | Hourless ‡ | Sam Hildreth | August Belmont Jr. |
| 1917 | Omar Khayyam ‡ | Richard F. Carmen | Wilfrid Viau |
| 1916 | Friar Rock | Sam Hildreth | August Belmont Jr. |
| 1915 | The Finn | Edward W. Heffner | Harry C. Hallenbeck |
| 1914 | Roamer | A. J. Goldsborough | Andrew Miller |
| 1913 | Rock View | Louis Feustel | August Belmont Jr. |
| 1912 | The Manager | Thomas Clay McDowell | Thomas Clay McDowell |
| 1911 | Meridian | Albert Ewing | Richard F. Carman |
| 1910 | Sweep ‡ | James G. Rowe Sr. | James R. Keene |
| 1910 | Dalmatian ‡ | Sam Hildreth | Sam Hildreth |
| 1909 | Fitz Herbert | Sam Hildreth | Sam Hildreth |
| 1908 | Colin | James G. Rowe Sr. | James R. Keene |
| 1907 | Peter Pan | James G. Rowe Sr. | James R. Keene |
| 1906 | Burgomaster ‡ | John W. Rogers | Harry Payne Whitney |
| 1906 | Accountant ‡ | Matthew M. Allen | James B. Brady |
| 1905 | Sysonby | James G. Rowe Sr. | James R. Keene |
| 1904 | Delhi ‡ | James G. Rowe Sr. | James R. Keene |
| 1904 | Ort Wells ‡ | Enoch Wishard | John A. Drake |
| 1903 | Africander | Richard O. Miller | Hampton Stable |
| 1902 | Hermis | John H. McCormack | Louis V. Bell |
| 1901 | Commando | James G. Rowe Sr. | James R. Keene |
| 1900 | Kilmarnock | John E. Madden | William Collins Whitney |
| 1899 | Ethelbert | A. Jack Joyner | Perry Belmont |
| 1898 | Hamburg | William Lakeland | Marcus Daly |
| 1897 | Ornament | Charles T. Patterson | Charles T. Patterson |
| 1896 | Requital | James G. Rowe Sr. | William P. Thompson |
| 1895 | Keenan | John J. Hyland | David Gideon & John Daly |
| 1894 | Domino ‡ | William Lakeland | James R. Keene |
| 1894 | Henry of Navarre ‡ | Byron McClelland | Byron McClelland |
| 1893 | Clifford ‡ | H. Eugene Leigh | H. Eugene Leigh & Robert L. Rose |
| 1893 | Morello ‡ | Frank Van Ness | Elkton Stable |
| 1892 | Tammany | Matthew Byrnes | Marcus Daly |
| 1891 | Potomac | Hardy Campbell Jr. | Michael F. Dwyer |
| 1890 | Tournament | Matthew M. Allen | George Hearst |
| 1889 | Salvator | Matthew Byrnes | James B. A. Haggin |
| 1888 | Emperor of Norfolk ‡ | Robert W. Thomas | E. J. "Lucky" Baldwin |
| 1888 | Sir Dixon ‡ | Frank McCabe | Dwyer Brothers Stable |
| 1887 | Hanover | Frank McCabe | Dwyer Brothers Stable |
| 1886 | Inspector B. ‡ | Frank McCabe | Dwyer Brothers Stable |
| 1886 | The Bard ‡ | John Huggins | Alexander J. Cassatt |
| 1885 | Joe Cotton ‡ | Alex Perry | James T. Williams |
| 1885 | Bersan ‡ | Green B. Morris | Green B. Morris |
| 1884 | St. Saviour | Evert V. Snedecker | Frederick Gebhard |
| 1883 | Leonatus | Rolla Colston | George Morgan & Jack P. Chinn |
| 1882 | Runnymede ‡ | James G. Rowe Sr. | Dwyer Brothers Stable |
| 1882 | Forester ‡ | Lewis Stuart | Appleby & Johnson |
| 1881 | Hindoo | Edward D. Brown | Dwyer Brothers Stable |
| 1880 | Grenada | R. Wyndham Walden | George L. Lorillard |
| 1879 | Falsetto | Eli Jordan | J. W. Hunt Reynolds |
| 1878 | Duke of Magenta | R. Wyndham Walden | George L. Lorillard |
| 1877 | Baden-Baden | James Williams | William B. Astor Jr. |
| 1876 | Vigil ‡ | Evert V. Snedecker | Dwyer Brothers Stable |
| 1876 | Vagrant ‡ | A. Davis Pryor | William B. Astor Jr. |
| 1875 | Tom Ochiltree | R. Wyndham Walden | John F. Chamberlain |
| 1874 | Acrobat | Charles S. Lloyd | K. W. Sears |
| 1872 | Joe Daniels | David McDaniel | David McDaniel |
| 1871 | Harry Bassett | David McDaniel | David McDaniel |

A ‡ designates co champion three-year-olds.
