= 1921 Kentucky Derby =

Horse race

47th Kentucky Derby
- Kentucky Derby
- Grade I stakes race
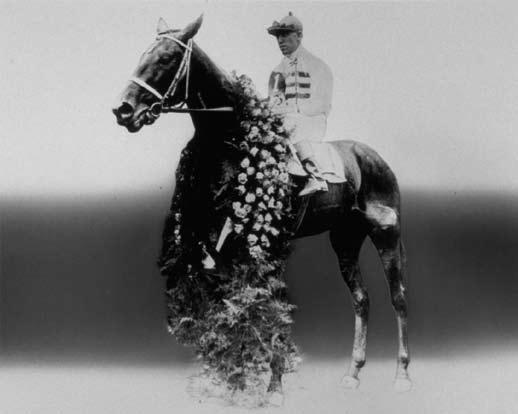
- Behave Yourself after winning the 1921 Kentucky Derby
- Location: Churchill Downs
- Date: May 7, 1921
- Winning horse: Behave Yourself
- Jockey: Charles Thompson
- Trainer: Herbert J. Thompson
- Owner: Edward R. Bradley
- Surface: Dirt

The 1921 Kentucky Derby was the 47th running of the Kentucky Derby. The race took place on May 7, 1921. Behave Yourself was the upset winner of the 1921 Kentucky Derby over his stablemate, Black Servant.

== Full results ==
| Finished | Post | Horse | Jockey | Trainer | Owner | Time / behind |
|---|---|---|---|---|---|---|
| 1st | 1 | Behave Yourself | Charles Thompson | Herbert J. Thompson | Edward R. Bradley | 2:04.20 |
| 2nd | 7 | Black Servant | Lawrence Lyke | Herbert J. Thompson | Edward R. Bradley | Head |
| 3rd | 2 | Prudery | Clarence Kummer | James G. Rowe Sr. | Harry Payne Whitney | 6 |
| 4th | 10 | Tryster | Frank Coltiletti | James G. Rowe Sr. | Harry Payne Whitney | 1/2 |
| 5th | 3 | Careful | Frank Keogh | Eugene Wayland | Walter J. Salmon Sr. | 4 |
| 6th | 5 | Coyne | Mack Garner | Charles C. Van Meter | Harned Bros. | 4 |
| 7th | 4 | Leonardo II | Andy Schuttinger | Kimball Patterson | Xalapa Farm Stable | 1 |
| 8th | 12 | Uncle Velo | Earl Pool | Will Perkins | George F. Baker | 1/2 |
| 9th | 11 | Bon Homme | Clifford Robinson | Kimball Patterson | Xalapa Farm Stable | 2 |
| 10th | 6 | Planet | Henry King | Will Buford | Hal Price Headley | 6 |
| 11th | 8 | Star Voter | Lavelle Ensor | Henry McDaniel | J. K. L. Ross | 5 |
| 12th | 9 | Muskallonge | George W. Carroll | Albert B. "Alex" Gordon | H. C. "Bud" Fisher | 1 |

- Winning Breeder: Edward R. Bradley; (KY)
- Horses Billy Barton, Grey Lag, and Firebrand scratched before the race.

== Payout ==
| Post | Horse | Win | Place | Show |
|---|---|---|---|---|
| 1 | Behave Yourself | $ 19.30 | 13.00 | 5.60 |
| 7 | Black Servant | | 13.00 | 5.60 |
| 2 | Prudery | | | 3.30 |

- The winner received a purse of $38,450.
- Second place received $10,000.
- Third place received $5,000.
- Fourth place received $2,000.
