= Blue Larkspur =

American-bred Thoroughbred racehorse

- Blue Larkspur, by Franklin Brooke Voss
- Sire: Black Servant
- Grandsire: Black Toney
- Dam: Blossom Time
- Damsire: North Star III
- Sex: Stallion
- Foaled: 1926
- Country: United States
- Color: Bay
- Breeder: Col. Edward Riley Bradley
- Owner: Col. Edward Riley Bradley
- Trainer: Herbert J. Thompson
- Record: 16:10–3–1
- Earnings: $272,070

Major wins
- Juvenile Stakes (1928); National Stallion Stakes (1928); Saratoga Special Stakes (1928); Withers Stakes (1929); Arlington Classic (1929); Stars and Stripes Handicap (1930); Arlington Cup (1930) American Classics wins: Belmont Stakes (1929)

Awards
- United States Horse of the Year (1929); U.S. Champion Older Male Horse (1930)

Honors
- United States Racing Hall of Fame (1957) #100 – Top 100 U.S. Racehorses of the 20th Century
- Last updated on September 19, 2006

Blue Larkspur (1926–1947) was a bay Kentucky-bred thoroughbred race horse. He was inducted into the National Museum of Racing and Hall of Fame in 1957, and ranks Number 100 in The Blood-Horse's top 100 U.S. thoroughbred champions of the 20th Century. Of the 127 stakes winners bred by Colonel Edward Riley Bradley at his Idle Hour Stock Farm in Lexington, Kentucky – which includes Bimelech out of La Troienne – Blue Larkspur was considered the Colonel's finest horse.

== Background ==
Blue Larkspur was sired by Black Servant, who was second in the 1921 Kentucky Derby, just behind his Idle Hour stablemate Behave Yourself. Black Servant was a son of Black Toney, who also sired Kentucky Derby winner Black Gold). Blue Larkspur's dam was Blossom Time, by North Star III and out of Vaila, an influential mare imported by Bradley.

Bradley's Idle Hour farm was also known as the "Lucky B" because he named most of his horses with "B" names. Blue Larkspur raced in Bradley's silks (white with green hoops and cap). Bradley also won the 1926 Kentucky Derby with Bubbling Over (sire of Baby League, dam of Busher); the 1932 Derby with Burgoo King; and the 1933 Derby with Brokers Tip. But his loss in 1921 with Black Servant rankled him, even though another of his horses took home the roses. He was furious with Black Servant's jockey, Charles Thompson, who had apparently defied orders to save the horse for the stretch run; rumors flew that Bradley (and many Idle Hour employees) had a great deal of money riding on Black Servant.

== Racing career ==
Blue Larkspur was trained by Herbert J. "Derby Dick" Thompson, an inductee of the National Museum of Racing Hall of Fame. Derby Dick was not kind to horses, working them hard. Thompson won more Kentucky Derbies than any other trainer before Ben Jones.

Racing as a two-year-old, Blue Larkspur started seven times. He won the Juvenile Stakes, the National Stallion Stakes, and the Saratoga Special Stakes. He was beaten in the Hopeful Stakes by Jack High (whom he had defeated three times), getting stuck in traffic and carrying high weight of 130 pounds. At the start of the Belmont Futurity, he was kicked by another horse, finished eighth and was rested for the remainder of the season.

In Blue Larkspur's time, there was no Southern racing circuit to prepare for the Kentucky Derby, so he was trained hard all winter in Lexington. In his first race as a three-year-old, he beat Clyde Van Dusen, a gelded son of Man o' War. On Derby Day, however, the track was deep and muddy. Because Thompson was suffering from appendicitis, an apprentice trainer prepared Blue Larkspur for the race and neglected to have him shod in "stickers" (special shoes for slippery mud). Blue Larkspur struggled to finish fourth, defeated by Clyde Van Dusen.

Later in his 3-year-old season, however, Blue Larkspur convincingly won the one-mile Withers Stakes. Ridden by Mack Garner, he closed with a rush. He also took the 1½-mile Belmont Stakes, although he was again kicked at the post and the track was muddy. He was kicked yet again in a later start. Although he won the race, the wound became infected and he was sidelined for a time. Following the layoff, he won the Arlington Classic by five lengths. His season ended with a bowed tendon, but he has still been retrospectively regarded as 1929's Horse of the Year. In contemporary sources he is credited with being the year's leading money winner, but there is no record of a formal award.

As a 4-year-old, Blue Larkspur raced three times (winning the Stars and Stripes Handicap and the Arlington Cup) before his leg again failed him. During his career (from 1928 to 1930) he raced 16 times with 10 wins, 3 seconds, and 1 third, earning $272,070.

== As a sire ==
As a stallion at Idle Hour Stock Farm, Blue Larkspur excelled as he had on the track – especially with his daughters. Among his progeny was Oedipus, the 1950 and 1951 American steeplechase champion. Blue Larkspur made the broodmare sires list every year from 1944 through 1960, with his daughters producing 114 stakes winners and six champions. This may be because he is thought to have been a carrier of the X factor, a genetic trait which causes an extraordinarily large heart, and is only passed on to a stallion's daughters via the x-chromosome, although the basis of this theory has not been scientifically proven and dismissed in scientific circles.

Blue Larkspur also produced the Hall of Famer Myrtlewood and Blue Denim, a mare who produced six stakes winners. Blue Denim's most important offspring was her daughter Ampola, who never won a stakes race but became one of the Stud Book's most important foundation mares for Gertrude T. Widener.

Blue Larkspur died in 1947, aged 21.

== Sire line tree ==
- Blue Larkspur
  - Boxthorn
  - Skylarking
  - Blue Flyer
  - Best Seller
  - Crowfoot
    - Jamie K
    - Easy Spur
  - Blue Swords
    - Blue Man
    - Blue Volt
  - Revoked
    - Rejected
      - Yankee Lad
    - Reneged
  - Three Rings
  - Oedipus
  - Blue Gay
  - Hawley

== Pedigree ==
Pedigree of Blue Larkspur, brown stallion, 1926
Sire Black Servant 1918	Black Toney	Peter Pan	Commando
Sire Black Servant 1918	Black Toney	Peter Pan	Cinderella
Sire Black Servant 1918	Black Toney	Belgravia	Ben Brush
Sire Black Servant 1918	Black Toney	Belgravia	Bonnie Gal
Sire Black Servant 1918	Padula	Laveno	Bend Or
Sire Black Servant 1918	Padula	Laveno	Napoli
Sire Black Servant 1918	Padula	Padua*	Thurio*
Sire Black Servant 1918	Padula	Padua*	Immortelle*
Dam Blossom Time 1920	North Star	Sunstar	Sundridge
Dam Blossom Time 1920	North Star	Sunstar	Doris
Dam Blossom Time 1920	North Star	Angelic	St Angelo
Dam Blossom Time 1920	North Star	Angelic	Fota
Dam Blossom Time 1920	Vaila	Fariman	Gallinule
Dam Blossom Time 1920	Vaila	Fariman	Bellinzona
Dam Blossom Time 1920	Vaila	Padilla	Macheath
Dam Blossom Time 1920	Vaila	Padilla	Padua* (family: 8-f)

* Blue Larkspur is inbred 3S x 4D to the mare Padua, meaning that she appears third generation on the sire side of his pedigree, and fourth generation on the dam side of his pedigree.

== See also ==
- Idle Hour Stock Farm
- Myrtlewood
- X factor
