= American Derby =

- Class: Listed
- Location: Churchill Downs; Kentucky, United States
- Inaugurated: 1884 (at Washington Park Race Track)
- Race type: Thoroughbred – Flat racing
- Website: American Derby

Race information
- Distance: 1 1/16 miles (8.5 furlongs; 1.7 km)
- Surface: Turf
- Track: Left-handed
- Qualification: Three-year-olds
- Weight: Assigned
- Purse: $100,000

The American Derby is an American Thoroughbred horse race first run at Chicago's old Washington Park Race Track on the city's South Side and raced there until 1905 when the facility was closed following the state's ban on gambling, and horse racing and the track was demolished. 1893's American Derby was the 2nd richest race in the U.S. during the 19th century.

There was no racing in Chicago in 1895, 1896, 1897, 1899, and again in 1905 and 1906. The effect would be that the American Derby was not run from 1905 through 1925, except for 1916 when it was hosted by the Hawthorne Race Course in Stickney, Illinois.

Revived in 1926, it evolved to become one of the important events of the American racing season that drew some of the very best horses from all over the country. It was run at the new Washington Park Race Track in Homewood, Illinois, in 1926 and 1927 and then was held at the Arlington Park course in 1928 before returning to the new Washington Park in 1929 where it remained through 1957. From 1958 until its closure in 2021, the race was run at Arlington Park. In 2022, the race took place at Churchill Downs. The following year it was hosted by Ellis Park Race Course, then in 2024 returned to Churchill Downs.

Since 1992 the American Derby has been run on turf. Previously, it had been raced on the turf course from 1955 through 1957 and from 1970 through 1976. Over the years, the distance has varied:

- 1 1/2 miles (2.4 km): 1884–1904, 1926, 1927, 1958–1961, 1966–1974, 1976
- 1 1/4 miles (2.0 km): 1928–1951, 1962–1965, 1977–1991
- 1 3/16 miles (1.9 km): 1916, 1955–1957, 1992–2014
- 1 1/8 miles (1.8 km): 1952–1954, 1958–1961, 1966–1974, 1976, 2015–2018
- 1 1/16 miles (1.7 km): 1975, 2019–2021
- 1 mile: 1952–1954, 1958–1961

== Records ==
Most wins by a jockey:

- 5 – Bill Shoemaker
- 5 – Eddie Arcaro
- 4 – Isaac Burns Murphy

Hall of Fame jockey George Woolf won the race three years in a row from 1942 to 1944.

Most wins by a trainer:

- 3 – Ben A. Jones (1941, 1949, 1952)
- 3 – Horace A. Jones (1947, 1948, 1961)
- 3 – Dermot K. Weld (2000, 2003, 2004)
- 3 – William I. Mott (2005, 2006, 2007)

Most wins by an owner:

- 8 – Calumet Farm
- 4 – Lucky Baldwin

== Winners ==
Year	Winner	Jockey	Trainer	Owner	Distance	Time
2025	Minaret Station	Cristian A. Torres	William Walden	OXO Equine LLC	1 1/16 miles (1.7 km)	1:44.29
2024	Brilliant Berti	Brian J. Hernandez Jr.	Cherie DeVaux	Klein Racing (Richard Klein)	1 1/16 miles (1.7 km)	1:41.92
2023	Wadsworth	Florent Geroux	Brad H. Cox	Godolphin, LLC	1 1/16 miles (1.7 km)	1:40.96
2022	Rattle N Roll	Brian Hernandez Jr.	Kenneth G. McPeek	Lucky Seven Stable	1 1/16 miles (1.7 km)	1:43.27
2021	Tango Tango Tango	Declan Cannon	Jack Sisterson	Calumet Farm	1 1/16 miles (1.7 km)	1:43.58
2019	Faraway Kitten	Adam Beschizza	Michael Maker	Kenneth and Sarah Ramsey	1 1/16 miles (1.7 km)	1:41.72
2018	Real Story	Joe Bravo	Ignacio Correas, VI	Jeffery S. Amling, and Merriebelle Stables, LLC	1 1/8 miles (1.8 km)	1:47.61
2017	Sonic Boom	Julien Leparoux	Ian Wilkes	Lothenbach Stables, Inc. (Bob Lothenbach)	1 1/8 miles (1.8 km)	1:49.90
2016	One Mean Man	Jose Lezcano	Bernard S. Flint	L. T. B., Inc. & Hillerich Racing, Inc.	1 1/8 miles (1.8 km)	1:48.86
2015	World Approval	Jose Lezcano	Mark Casse	Live Oak Plantation Stable (Charlotte Weber)	1 3/16 miles (1.9 km)	1:52.92
2014	Divine Oath	Florent Geroux	Todd Pletcher	Let's Go Stable (Kevin Scatuorchio & Bryan Sullivan)	1 3/16 Miles	1:56.50
2013	Infinite Magic	Channing Hill	Richard C. Mettee	Team Valor International	1 3/16 miles (1.9 km)	1:55.41
2012	Cozzetti	Shaun Bridgmohan	Dale L. Romans	Albaugh Family Stable	1 3/16 miles (1.9 km)	1:57.42
2011	Willcox Inn	Robby Albarado	Michael Stidham	All In Stable	1 3/16 miles (1.9 km)	1:54.56
2010	Workin For Hops	Francisco Torres	Michael Stidham	Estorance, LLC	1 3/16 miles (1.9 km)	1:55.47
2009	Reb	Julien Leparoux	George Arnold II	Ashbrook Farm	1 3/16 miles (1.9 km)	1:56.09
2008	Tizdejavu	René Douglas	Greg Fox	Cooper/Ziebarth	1 3/16 miles (1.9 km)	1:59.88
2007	Lattice	Robby Albarado	William I. Mott	Claiborne Farm	1 3/16 miles (1.9 km)	1:54.85
2006	Union Avenue	Larry Melancon	William I. Mott	WinStar Farm	1 3/16 miles (1.9 km)	1:57.20
2005	Gun Salute	Cornelio Velásquez	William I. Mott	Brant M. Laue	1 3/16 miles (1.9 km)	1:55.31
2004	Simple Exchange	Pat Smullen	Dermot K. Weld	Moyglare Stud	1 3/16 miles (1.9 km)	1:54.93
2003	Evolving Tactics	Pat Smullen	Dermot K. Weld	Moyglare Stud	1 3/16 miles (1.9 km)	1:59.04
2002	Mananan McLir	René Douglas	Wallace Dollase	M. Jarvis/G. Margolis et al.	1 3/16 miles (1.9 km)	1:57.11
2001	Fan Club's Mister	Randy Meier	Rickey B. Harris	P. Miessler & C. Raber	1 3/16 miles (1.9 km)	2:03.27
2000	Pine Dance	Eddie Ahern	Dermot K. Weld	Highland Farms et al.	1 3/16 miles (1.9 km)	1:55.46
	No race 1998–1999					
1997	Honor Glide	Garrett Gomez	Jim Day	Robert Schaedle III	1 3/16 miles (1.9 km)	1:55.94
1996	Jaunatxo ‡	Juvenal Diaz	Louie J. Roussel III	Louie J. Roussel III	1 3/16 miles (1.9 km)	1:55.82
1995	Gold And Steel	Aaron Gryder	Jean-Claude Rouget	Gary A. Tanaka	1 3/16 miles (1.9 km)	1:55.02
1994	Overbury ††	Shane Sellers	David Loder	Sheikh Mohammed	1 3/16 miles (1.9 km)	1:55.29
1994	Vaudeville ††	Aldaberto Lopez	Fordell Fierce	Ron Crockett	1 3/16 miles (1.9 km)	1:55.29
1993	Explosive Red	Shane Sellers	Daniel J. Vella	Frank Stronach	1 3/16 miles (1.9 km)	1:59.92
1992	The Name's Jimmy	Pat Day	Charles R. Stutts	Mount Joy Stables, Inc. (Brian & Jan Burns)	1 3/16 miles (1.9 km)	1:59.41
1991	Olympio	Eddie Delahoussaye	Ron McAnally	Verne Winchell	1 1/4 miles (2.0 km)	2:00.99
1990	Real Cash	Pat Valenzuela	D. Wayne Lukas	Lukas & Overbrook	1 1/4 miles (2.0 km)	2:02.00
1989	Awe Inspiring	Craig Perret	C. R. McGaughey III	Ogden Mills Phipps	1 1/4 miles (2.0 km)	2:02.40
	No race 1988					
1987	Fortunate Moment	Earlie Fires	Harvey L. Vanier	Jerry Pinkley	1 1/4 miles (2.0 km)	2:03.80
	No race 1986					
1985	Creme Fraiche	Eddie Maple	Woody Stephens	Brushwood Stable	1 1/4 miles (2.0 km)	2:01.60
1984	At The Threshold †	Pat Day	Lynn S. Whiting	W. Cal Partee	1 1/4 miles (2.0 km)	2:04.00
1984	High Alexander †	Gerland Gallitano	Jim Levtich	J. M. Levitch Sr.	1 1/4 miles (2.0 km)	2:04.00
1983	Play Fellow	Pat Day	Harvey L. Vanier	Vanier, Lauer, Victor	1 1/4 miles (2.0 km)	2:04.00
1982	Wolfie's Rascal	Ruben Hernandez	Howard M. Tesher	Sidney L. Port et al.	1 1/4 miles (2.0 km)	2:05.60
1981	Pocket Zipper	Ray Sibille	Richard Hazelton	Mr. & Mrs. Robert F. Bensinger	1 1/4 miles (2.0 km)	2:03.80
1980	Hurry Up Blue	Gerland Gallitano	Joseph M. Bollero	Russell L. Reineman	1 1/4 miles (2.0 km)	2:04.40
1979	Smarten	Sam Maple	Woody Stephens	Ryehill Farm	1 1/4 miles (2.0 km)	2:05.20
1978	Nasty And Bold	Jean-Luc Samyn	Philip G. Johnson	Meadowhill Farm	1 1/4 miles (2.0 km)	2:03.40
1977	Silver Series	Larry Snyder	Oscar Dishman Jr.	Archie R. Donaldson	1 1/4 miles (2.0 km)	2:02.40
1976	Fifth Marine	Ron Turcotte	Sidney Watters Jr.	Pamela H. Firman	1 1/8 miles (1.8 km)	1:49.20
1975	Honey Mark	Garth Patterson	Larry Robideaux Jr.	Mr. & Mrs. F. Roberts	1 1/16 miles (1.7 km)	1:44.40
1974	Determined King	Daryl Montoya	Eugene Jacobs	Herbert A. Allen Sr.	1 1/8 miles (1.8 km)	1:47.80
1973	Bemo	William Passmore	John W. Murphy	Hickory Tree Stable	1 1/8 miles (1.8 km)	1:49.60
1972	Dubassoff	Jacinto Vásquez	Thomas J. Kelly	John M. Schiff	1 1/8 miles (1.8 km)	1:50.00
1971	Bold Reason	Laffit Pincay Jr.	Angel Penna Sr.	William A. Levin	1 1/8 miles (1.8 km)	1:50.00
1970	The Pruner	Braulio Baeza	Edward A. Neloy	Ogden Phipps	1 1/8 miles (1.8 km)	1:47.00
1969	Fast Hilarious	Laffit Pincay Jr.	Joseph M. Bollero	Dorothy C. Rigney	1 1/8 miles (1.8 km)	1:48.00
1968	Forward Pass	Ismael Valenzuela	Henry Forrest	Calumet Farm	1 1/8 miles (1.8 km)	1:48.00
1967	Damascus	Bill Shoemaker	Frank Y. Whiteley Jr.	Edith W. Bancroft	1 1/8 miles (1.8 km)	1:46.80
1966	Buckpasser	Braulio Baeza	Edward A. Neloy	Ogden Phipps	1 1/8 miles (1.8 km)	1:47.00
1965	Tom Rolfe	Bill Shoemaker	Frank Y. Whiteley Jr.	Powhatan Stables	1 1/4 miles (2.0 km)	2:00.60
1964	Roman Brother	Fernando Alvarez	Burley Parke	Harbor View Farm	1 1/4 miles (2.0 km)	2:01.40
1963	Candy Spots	Bill Shoemaker	Mesh Tenney	Rex C. Ellsworth	1 1/4 miles (2.0 km)	2:02.00
1962	Black Sheep	Johnny Longden	Charlie Whittingham	C. R. Mac Stable	1 1/4 miles (2.0 km)	2:01.00
1961	Beau Prince	Steve Brooks	Horace A. Jones	Calumet Farm	1 1/8 miles (1.8 km)	1:51.00
1960	T. V. Lark	Johnny Sellers	Paul K. Parker	Preston W. Madden	1 1/8 miles (1.8 km)	1:47.20
1959	Dunce	Lois C. Cook	Moody Jolley	Claiborne Farm	1 1/8 miles (1.8 km)	1:49.00
1958	Nadir	Manuel Ycaza	Moody Jolley	Claiborne Farm	1 1/8 miles (1.8 km)	1:51.00
1957	Round Table	Bill Shoemaker	William Molter	Kerr Stable	1 3/16 miles (1.9 km)	1:55.00
1956	Swoon's Son	Eddie Arcaro	Lex Wilson	E. Gay Drake	1 3/16 miles (1.9 km)	1:59.00
1955	Swaps	Bill Shoemaker	Mesh Tenney	Rex C. Ellsworth	1 3/16 miles (1.9 km)	1:54.60
1954	Errard King	Sam Boulmetis Sr.	Thomas J. Barry	Joseph Gavegnano	1 1/8 miles (1.8 km)	1:49.00
1953	Native Dancer	Eddie Arcaro	William C. Winfrey	Alfred G. Vanderbilt II	1 1/8 miles (1.8 km)	1:48.40
1952	Mark-Ye-Well	Eddie Arcaro	Ben A. Jones	Calumet Farm	1 1/8 miles (1.8 km)	1:49.00
1951	Hall of Fame	Ted Atkinson	John M. Gaver Sr.	Greentree Stable	1 1/4 miles (2.0 km)	2:01.00
1950	Hill Prince	Eddie Arcaro	Casey Hayes	Christopher Chenery	1 1/4 miles (2.0 km)	2:01.20
1949	Ponder	Steve Brooks	Ben A. Jones	Calumet Farm	1 1/4 miles (2.0 km)	2:00.00
1948	Citation	Eddie Arcaro	Horace A. Jones	Calumet Farm	1 1/4 miles (2.0 km)	2:01.60
1947	Fervent	Douglas Dodson	Horace A. Jones	Calumet Farm	1 1/4 miles (2.0 km)	2:00.00
1946	Eternal Reward	R. Campbell	Chester J. Hall	Augustus & Nahm	1 1/4 miles (2.0 km)	2:02.00
1945	Fighting Step	G. South	Charles C. Norman	Murlogg Farm	1 1/4 miles (2.0 km)	2:02.00
1944	By Jimminy	George Woolf	James W. Smith	Alfred P. Parker	1 1/4 miles (2.0 km)	2:03.00
1943	Askmenow	George Woolf	Kenneth Osborne	Hal Price Headley	1 1/4 miles (2.0 km)	2:07.00
1942	Alsab	George Woolf	Sarge Swenke	Albert Sabath	1 1/4 miles (2.0 km)	2:06.60
1941	Whirlaway	Alfred Robertson	Ben A. Jones	Calumet Farm	1 1/4 miles (2.0 km)	2:04.00
1940	Mioland	John H. Adams	Tom Smith	Charles S. Howard	1 1/4 miles (2.0 km)	2:05.00
	No race 1938–1939					
1937	Dawn Play	Lester Balaski	Max Hirsch	King Ranch	1 1/4 miles (2.0 km)	2:05.00
	No race 1936					
1935	Black Helen	Don Meade	Bill Hurley	Edward R. Bradley	1 1/4 miles (2.0 km)	2:01.40
1934	Cavalcade	Mack Garner	Robert A. Smith	Brookmeade Stable	1 1/4 miles (2.0 km)	2:04.00
1933	Mr. Khayyam	Pete Walls	Matthew Peter Brady	Catawba Farm Stable (Madelaine H. Austin)	1 1/4 miles (2.0 km)	2:04.00
1932	Gusto	Silvio Coucci	Max Hirsch	Morton L. Schwartz	1 1/4 miles (2.0 km)	2:10.00
1931	Mate	George Ellis	James W. Healy	Albert C. Bostwick Jr.	1 1/4 miles (2.0 km)	2:04.00
1930	Reveille Boy	Willie Fronk	John L. Paul	John A. Best	1 1/4 miles (2.0 km)	2:04.00
1929	Windy City	Lawrence McDermott	Jake Lowenstein	Fred M. Grabner	1 1/4 miles (2.0 km)	2:10.00
1928	Toro	Eddie Ambrose	John F. Schorr	Edward Beale McLean	1 1/4 miles (2.0 km)	2:05.00
1927	Hydromel	Lawrence McDermott	Daniel E. Stewart	Johnson N. Camden Jr.	1 1/2 miles (2.4 km)	2:29.00
1926	Boot to Boot	Albert Johnson	Bill Hurley	Idle Hour Stock Farm	1 1/2 miles (2.4 km)	2:30.00
	No race 1917–1925					
1916	Dodge	Frank Murphy	John S. Ward	Weber & Ward	1 3/16 miles (1.9 km)	2:04.00
	No race 1905–1915					
1904	Highball	Grover Fuller	John W. May	Walter M. Scheftel	1 1/2 miles (2.4 km)	2:33.00
1903	The Picket	Albert B. Helgesen	Carroll B. Reid	Middleton & Jungbluth	1 1/2 miles (2.4 km)	2:33.00
1902	Wyeth	Lucien Lyne	Enoch Wishard	John A. Drake	1 1/2 miles (2.4 km)	2:40.00
1901	Robert Waddell	John Bullman	Theodore F. Coles	Mrs. R. Bradley	1 1/2 miles (2.4 km)	2:33.00
1900	Sidney Lucas	John Bullman	R. S. Thompson	Thompson Bros.	1 1/2 miles (2.4 km)	2:40.25
	No race 1899					
1898	Pink Coat	W. Martin	Patrick Dunne	Woodford & Buckner	1 1/2 miles (2.4 km)	2:42.00
	No race 1895–1897					
1894	Rey el Santa Anita	Eugene Van Kuren	Henry McDaniel	Lucky Baldwin	1 1/2 miles (2.4 km)	2:36.00
1893	Boundless	Edward H. Garrison	William McDaniel	John E. Cushing & John W. Orth	1 1/2 miles (2.4 km)	2:36.00
1892	Carlsbad	Robert "Tiny" Williams	C. Porter	Robert A. Swigert	1 1/2 miles (2.4 km)	3:04.25
1891	Strathmeath	George Covington	Green B. Morris	Green B. Morris	1 1/2 miles (2.4 km)	2:49.25
1890	Uncle Bob	Thomas Kiley	B. J. Johnson	Chicago Stable	1 1/2 miles (2.4 km)	2:55.75
1889	Spokane	Thomas Kiley	John Rodegap	Noah Armstrong	1 1/2 miles (2.4 km)	2:41.25
1888	Emperor of Norfolk	Isaac Burns Murphy	Robert W. Thomas	Lucky Baldwin	1 1/2 miles (2.4 km)	2:40.50
1887	C. H. Todd	Anthony Hamilton	James B. A. Haggin	James B. A. Haggin	1 1/2 miles (2.4 km)	2:36.50
1886	Silver Cloud	Isaac Burns Murphy	Albert Cooper	Lucky Baldwin	1 1/2 miles (2.4 km)	2:37.25
1885	Volante	Isaac Burns Murphy	Albert Cooper	Lucky Baldwin	1 1/2 miles (2.4 km)	2:49.50
1884	Modesty	Isaac Burns Murphy	John W. Rogers	Edward Corrigan	1 1/2 miles (2.4 km)	2:42.00

† Dead Heat in 1984

†† Dead Heat in 1994

‡ In 1996, the first-place finisher Trail City was disqualified and placed second
