= William A. Hurley =

American horse trainer

Bill Hurley
Personal information
- Born: c.1871 Rochester, New York, U.S.
- Died: September 12, 1952
- Occupation: Trainer

Horse racing career
- Sport: Horse racing
- Career wins: Not found

Major racing wins
- Jerome Stakes (1920); American Derby (1926, 1935); Latonia Derby (1926); Louisiana Derby (1926, 1927); Saratoga Special Stakes (1934); Coaching Club American Oaks (1935); Florida Derby (1935); Maryland Handicap (1935); Hopeful Stakes (1936, 1939); Selima Stakes (1938); Belmont Futurity Stakes (1939); Laurel Futurity Stakes (1939); Sanford Stakes (1939); Blue Grass Stakes (1940); Derby Trial Stakes (1940) American Classic Race wins: Preakness Stakes (1917, 1940); Belmont Stakes (1940)

Significant horses
- Kalitan, Bagenbaggage, Black Helen, Bimelech
- Updated on May 1, 2007

William A. "Bill" Hurley (c.1871 - September 12, 1952) was an American horse trainer in Thoroughbred horse racing. He is best remembered for his more than two decades as a trainer for Col. Edward R. Bradley's Idle Hour Stock Farm.

Among Bill Hurley's early victories was a win with Kalitan in his first Preakness Stakes in 1917, a race he would win again twenty-three years later. He trained Bagenbaggage, who won the 1926 Latonia and Louisiana Derbys and was second in the Kentucky Derby to stablemate, Bubbling Over. That same year Hurley also won the 1926 American Derby with Boot to Boot, beating both Display and Black Maria.

In 1935, Bill Hurley won the Florida Derby, Coaching Club American Oaks and American Derby with the great filly and 1991 U.S. Racing Hall of Fame inductee, Black Helen.

Another of Hurley's important Hall of Fame horses was Bimelech who earned U.S. Champion 2-Yr-Old Colt and 3-Year-Old honors in 1939 and 1940 respectively, and who just missed winning the U.S. Triple Crown when he finished second in the 1940 Kentucky Derby then won both the Preakness and Belmont Stakes.

After 46 years with Idle Hour Stock Farm, Bill Hurley retired from racing in 1940. He died at age 81 in 1952 at Doctors Hospital in Coral Gables, Florida.
