= Commando (horse) =

20th-century American Thoroughbred race horse

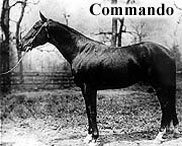
- Commando, c. 1901
- Sire: Domino
- Grandsire: Himyar
- Dam: Emma C.
- Damsire: Darebin
- Sex: Stallion
- Foaled: 1898
- Died: 1905 (aged 6–7)
- Country: United States
- Colour: Bay
- Breeder: Castleton Stud
- Owner: James R. Keene
- Trainer: James G. Rowe Sr.
- Record: 9: 7-2-0
- Earnings: $58,196

Major wins
- Brighton Junior Stakes (1900); Great Trial Stakes (1900); Montauk Stakes (1900); Zephyr Stakes (1900); Junior Champion Stakes (1900); Belmont Stakes (1901); Carlton Stakes (1901)

Awards
- U.S. Champion 2-Yr-Old Colt (1900); United States Horse of the Year (1900 & 1901); U.S. Champion 3-Yr-Old Colt (1901); Leading sire in North America (1907)

Honours
- United States Racing Hall of Fame (1956)
- Last updated on February 4, 2007

Commando (1898–1905) was an American Hall of Fame Champion Thoroughbred racehorse.

== Racing career ==
Bred at Castleton Stud by owner James R. Keene, Commando raced at age two, winning five of his six starts and finishing second in the other as a result of jockey error. At age three, Commando raced only three times, winning the Belmont Stakes and the Carlton Stakes. In the Belmont Stakes at Morris Park Racecourse he faced two opponents, only one of whom, The Parader, was seen as a serious rival. Commando made almost all the running before going clear in the straight and winning by two lengths, in track record time for the distance. Although he finished second, an injury in the Lawrence Realization Stakes ended his racing career.

Race record: 9-7-2-0. Career earnings: $58,196
Date	Track	Race	Distance (Furlongs)	Finish (margin)	Chart comment	Notes
6-25-1900	Sheepshead Bay	Zephyr Stakes	6 (about)	1 (1½)	"Much the best"	Futurity course Track: good
6-30-1900	Sheepshead Bay	Great Trial Stakes	6 (about)	1 (3)	"Eased up"	Futurity course
7-6-1900	Brighton Beach	Montauk Stakes	6	1 (8)	"Outclassed rest"	
8-7-1900	Brighton Beach	Brighton Junior	6	1 (head)	"best"	
9-11-1900	Gravesend	Junior Championship	6	1 (1)	"Eased up at end"	
10-2-1900	Morris Park	Matron Stakes	6 (about)	2 (½)	"Poor ride"	Eclipse course
5-23-1901	Morris Park	Belmont Stakes	11	1 (½)	"Tired at end"	
6-1-1901	Gravesend	Carlton Stakes	8	1 (4)	"Never extended"	
7-4-1901	Sheepshead Bay	Lawrence Realization	13	2 (2)	"Tired badly, game"	Track: muddy

== Stud record ==
Retired to stand at stud at Castleton Farm, Commando proved to be a successful sire. He died on 13 March 1905 at age seven after developing tetanus from a cut sustained to his foot. He was buried at Castleton Farm. Although his breeding career was limited to four seasons, Commando produced 10 stakes winners from 27 foals and posthumously topped the U.S. sire list in 1907. Among his progeny were Hall of Fame champions Colin and Peter Pan.

== Honors ==
In 1956, Commando was inducted posthumously into the National Museum of Racing and Hall of Fame. A painting of Commando by equine artist Charles L. Zellinsky is on display as part of the museum's collection.

== Sire line tree ==
- Commando
  - Peter Pan
    - Black Toney
      - Black Servant
        - Blue Larkspur
        - Big Pebble
      - Beau Butler
      - Black Gold
      - Broadway Jones
      - Black Panther
      - Brokers Tip
        - Market Wise
      - Balladier
        - Bold And Bad
        - Spy Song
        - Double Jay
        - Mr Music
      - Bimelech
        - Brookfield
        - Burning Dream
        - Bymeabond
        - Blue Border
        - Better Self
        - Guillotine
        - Bassanio
        - Bradley
        - Hilarious
        - Torch Of War
        - Jabneh
        - Laugh
        - Getthere Jack
    - Pennant
      - Bunting
      - Jolly Roger
      - Valorous
      - Equipoise
        - Attention
        - Equestrian
        - Bolingbroke
        - Swing And Sway
        - Shut Out
      - Red Rain
      - Dauber
      - The Chief
      - Maeda
        - Delegate
    - Tryster
    - Laurano
    - Croyden
    - Macaw
    - Captain Kettle
    - Peter Hastings
      - Petrose
        - Pet Bully
  - Superman
    - Gladiator
    - Surf Rider
  - Celt
    - Dunboyne
    - Touch Me Not
  - Peter Quince
    - Papp
    - Peter King
  - Colin
    - Gentle Shepherd
    - On Watch
      - Sortie
        - Magic Hour
      - Tick On
      - Observant
      - Time Clock
      - Brazado
        - Flash Burn
        - Curandero
    - Jock
    - Neddie
      - Good Goods
        - Alsab
      - Nedayr
      - Neds Flying
  - Transvaal
    - Boniface
  - Ultimus
    - Luke McLuke
      - Mr Sponge
    - High Cloud
      - Holyrood
    - High Time
      - Sarazen
      - High Strung
        - Star Fiddle
      - Zacaweista
        - Buzfuz
    - Infinite
      - Economic
      - Inshore
      - Inlander
    - Westwick
      - Speculate
    - Stimulus
      - Clang
      - Danger Point
      - Stir Up
    - Supremus
      - Dynastic

== Pedigree ==
Pedigree of Commando, bay stallion, 1898
Sire Domino	Himyar	Alarm	Eclipse
Sire Domino	Himyar	Alarm	Maud
Sire Domino	Himyar	Hira	Lexington*
Sire Domino	Himyar	Hira	Hegira
Sire Domino	Mannie Gray	Enquirer	Leamington
Sire Domino	Mannie Gray	Enquirer	Lida*
Sire Domino	Mannie Gray	Lizzie G	War Dance*
Sire Domino	Mannie Gray	Lizzie G	Lecomte mare
Dam Emma C.	Darebin	The Peer	Melbourne
Dam Emma C.	Darebin	The Peer	Cinizelli
Dam Emma C.	Darebin	Lurline	Traducer
Dam Emma C.	Darebin	Lurline	Mermaid
Dam Emma C.	Guenn	Flood	Norfolk*
Dam Emma C.	Guenn	Flood	Hennie Farrow
Dam Emma C.	Guenn	Glendew	Glengarry
Dam Emma C.	Guenn	Glendew	Glenrose* (family: 12-b)

* Commando is inbred 4S x 5S x 5S x 5D x 5D to the stallion Lexington, meaning that he appears fourth generation once and fifth generation twice (via Lida and War Dance) on the sire side of his pedigree, and fifth generation twice (via Norfolk and Glenrose) on the dam side of his pedigree.
