= Kalitan =

American-bred Thoroughbred racehorse

- Sire: Rey Hindoo
- Grandsire: Rey El Santa Anita
- Dam: Dally
- Damsire: Giganteum
- Sex: Stallion
- Foaled: 1914
- Country: United States
- Colour: Brown/Bay
- Breeder: Lawrence and Comstock
- Owner: Edward R. Bradley
- Trainer: William A. Hurley
- Record: Not found
- Earnings: Not found

Major wins
- Triple Crown Race wins: Preakness Stakes (1917)

Kalitan (1914 – 1935) was an American Thoroughbred racehorse best known for winning the 1917 Preakness Stakes. Owned by Edward R. Bradley, he was sired by Rey Hindoo. Kalitan was out of the mare Dally, a daughter of Giganteum.

== Preakness Stakes ==
Kalitan is probably best remembered for his win in the $7,500 Preakness Stakes at Pimlico Race Course in Baltimore, Maryland in which he finished in a final time of 1:54.40 for the one and one eighth mile race.

On May 12, 1917, Kalitan's owner, Edward R. Bradley, entered the horse in the 42nd running of the Preakness Stakes in a capacity field of 14 stakes winning colts. That race drew a full field even though it was held on the same day as the Kentucky Derby that was won by Omar Khayyam. The Preakness and Kentucky Derby were held on the same day again on May 13, 1922.

Breaking from post position five, Kalitan started at odds of 10-1 under jockey Everett Haynes and settled in third behind leader Fruit Cake and Jock Scot passing the grand stand for the first time. Then Kalitan went to the front with an early rush down the backstretch, leading at the half in 48-1/5. Around the far turn, he drew away and won by two lengths, easing up prior to the finish.

After the race, Kalitan became the first Preakness Stakes winner to be presented with the most valuable trophy in sports, the Woodlawn Vase, in front of the old Club House at Pimlico Race Course.

== Stud career ==
Kalitan stood for most of his stud career at the Lookover Stallion Station in Avon, New York. He was euthanized in 1935.

== Pedigree ==
Pedigree of Kalitan (USA), bay stallion, 1914
Sire Rey Hindoo (USA) 1905	Rey El Santa Anita (USA); 1891	Cheviot (NZ)	Traducer (GB)
Sire Rey Hindoo (USA) 1905	Rey El Santa Anita (USA); 1891	Cheviot (NZ)	Idalia (GB)
Sire Rey Hindoo (USA) 1905	Rey El Santa Anita (USA); 1891	Alaho	Grinstead
Sire Rey Hindoo (USA) 1905	Rey El Santa Anita (USA); 1891	Alaho	Experiment
Sire Rey Hindoo (USA) 1905	La Hindos (USA); 1898	Amigo	Prince Charlie (GB)
Sire Rey Hindoo (USA) 1905	La Hindos (USA); 1898	Amigo	Mission Belle
Sire Rey Hindoo (USA) 1905	La Hindos (USA); 1898	Lizzie B	Hindoo
Sire Rey Hindoo (USA) 1905	La Hindos (USA); 1898	Lizzie B	Eppie L
Dam Dally (USA) 1905	Giganteum (GB); 1891	Bend Or	Doncaster
Dam Dally (USA) 1905	Giganteum (GB); 1891	Bend Or	Rouge Rose
Dam Dally (USA) 1905	Giganteum (GB); 1891	Tiger Lily	Macaroni
Dam Dally (USA) 1905	Giganteum (GB); 1891	Tiger Lily	Polly Agnes
Dam Dally (USA) 1905	Dal (USA); 1886	Mortemer (FR)	Compiegne
Dam Dally (USA) 1905	Dal (USA); 1886	Mortemer (FR)	Comtesse
Dam Dally (USA) 1905	Dal (USA); 1886	Katie Pearce	Leamington (GB)
Dam Dally (USA) 1905	Dal (USA); 1886	Katie Pearce	Stamps (Family 12-b)
