= Bagenbaggage =

American Thoroughbred racehorse

- Sire: Under Fire
- Grandsire: Swynford
- Dam: Blushing Beauty
- Damsire: Cunard
- Sex: Stallion
- Foaled: 1923
- Country: United States
- Colour: Bay
- Breeder: Idle Hour Stock Farm
- Owner: Idle Hour Stock Farm Stable
- Trainer: William A. Hurley
- Record: 15: 7-5-0
- Earnings: US$49,395

Major wins
- Latonia Derby (1936); Louisiana Derby (1936); St. Valentine Handicap (1936); Midway Purse (1936) U.S. Triple Crown series: Kentucky Derby (2nd); Preakness Stakes (8th)

Bagenbaggage (foaled 1923 in Kentucky) was an American Thoroughbred multiple Derby-winning racehorse who was bred and owned by the Idle Hour Stock Farm of Edward R. Bradley. At the time a major force in Thoroughbred racing, Bradley's horses would win the Kentucky Derby four times.

== Racing career ==
Competing as a three-year-old in 1926, Bagenbaggage's primary jockey was future Fair Grounds Racing Hall of Fame inductee, Eric Blind. With the eighteen-year-old Blind aboard, the bay colt set a new track record in winning the 1926 Louisiana Derby, won the Latonia Derby, and ran second to his stablemate in the Kentucky Derby. In a year when the Preakness Stakes was run before the Kentucky Derby, Bagenbaggage had won four straight races by three or more lengths when he inexplicably ran eighth in the Preakness behind winner, Display.

Bagenbaggage was retired to stud duty after the end of his three-year-old campaign. He was unsuccessful as a sire.

== Pedigree ==
Pedigree of Bagenbaggage, chestnut colt, 1923
Sire Under Fire	Swynford	John O'Gaunt	Isinglass
Sire Under Fire	Swynford	John O'Gaunt	Le Fleche
Sire Under Fire	Swynford	Canterbury Pilgrim	Tristan*
Sire Under Fire	Swynford	Canterbury Pilgrim	Pilgrimage
Sire Under Fire	Startling	Laveno	Bend Or*
Sire Under Fire	Startling	Laveno	Napoli
Sire Under Fire	Startling	Astrology	Hermit*
Sire Under Fire	Startling	Astrology	Stella
Dam Blushing Beauty	Cunard	Goldfinch	Ormonde*
Dam Blushing Beauty	Cunard	Goldfinch	Thistle
Dam Blushing Beauty	Cunard	Lucania	Sir Modred
Dam Blushing Beauty	Cunard	Lucania	School Girl
Dam Blushing Beauty	Miss Ringlets	Handball	Hanover
Dam Blushing Beauty	Miss Ringlets	Handball	Keepsake
Dam Blushing Beauty	Miss Ringlets	Bessie	The Ill-Used
Dam Blushing Beauty	Miss Ringlets	Bessie	Belle of Nantura (family: A27)

* Bagenbaggage is inbred 5S x 4S to the stallion Hermit, meaning that he appears fifth generation (via Tristan) and fourth generation on the sire side of his pedigree.

* Bagenbaggage is inbred 4S x 5D to the stallion Bend Or, meaning that he appears fourth generation on the sire side of his pedigree, and fifth generation (via Ormonde) on the dam side of his pedigree.
