= Oedipus (horse) =

American-bred Thoroughbred racehorse

- Sire: Blue Larkspur
- Grandsire: Black Servant
- Dam: Be Like Mom
- Damsire: Sickle
- Sex: Gelding
- Foaled: 1946
- Country: USA
- Colour: Brown
- Breeder: Idle Hour Stock Farm
- Owner: Lillian Bostwick Phipps
- Trainer: Pete Bostwick
- Record: 58: 14-12-9
- Earnings: $132,405

Major wins
- Brook National Handicap (1950, 1951); Broad Hollow Handicap (1950, 1951); American Grand National (1951)

Awards
- American Champion Steeplechase Horse (1950, 1951, 1952)

Honours
- Aiken Thoroughbred Racing Hall of Fame inductee (1977); United States Racing Hall of Fame inductee (1978)

Oedipus (1946–1978) was an American Champion Thoroughbred steeplechase racehorse. Sired by 1929's flat racing Horse of the Year Blue Larkspur and foaled in Kentucky, Oedipus was purchased by Lillian Bostwick Phipps and was conditioned by future Hall of Fame trainer Pete Bostwick.

Oedipus raced from 1948 through 1954 and was voted American Champion Steeplechase Horse for 1950 and again in 1951 when he won American steeplechasing's Triple Crown: the Broad Hollow Steeplechase Handicap, the Brook National Steeplechase Handicap, and the American Grand National. In 1952, Oedipus was again voted Champion, this time sharing the honor with Jam.

Retired at the end of the 1954 racing season, Oedipus died in 1978, the year he was inducted in the United States' National Museum of Racing and Hall of Fame.
