= Rejected (horse) =

American-bred Thoroughbred racehorse

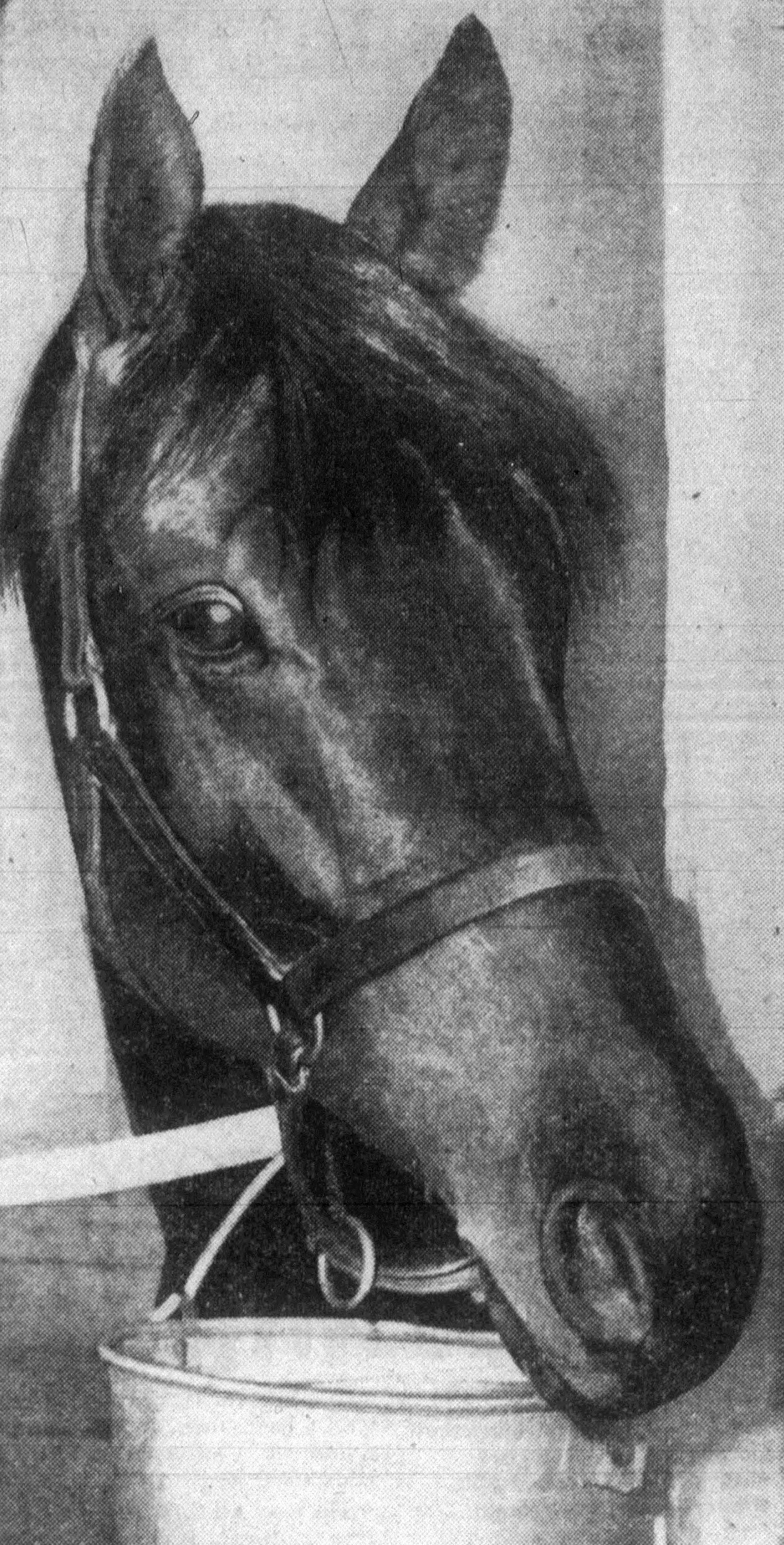
- Rejected, circa 1954
- Sire: Revoked
- Grandsire: Blue Larkspur
- Dam: By Line
- Damsire: Blenheim
- Sex: Stallion
- Foaled: 1950
- Country: United States
- Colour: Brown
- Breeder: King Ranch
- Owner: King Ranch
- Trainer: William J. Hirsch
- Record: 47: 11-10-2
- Earnings: US$544,500

Major wins
- Westerner Stakes (1953); Oakland Handicap (1953); American Handicap (1954); Hawthorne Gold Cup (1954); Santa Anita Handicap (1954); Hollywood Gold Cup (1955); San Pasqual Handicap (1955)

Rejected (foaled 1950) was an American Thoroughbred racehorse whose wins included the Hollywood Gold Cup in track record time and Santa Anita Handicap, the two most important races in California open to older horses.

Bred and raced by Robert Kleberg's King Ranch, Rejected was trained by future U.S. Racing Hall of Fame inductee, Buddy Hirsch.
