= Behave Yourself (horse) =

American Thoroughbred racehorse

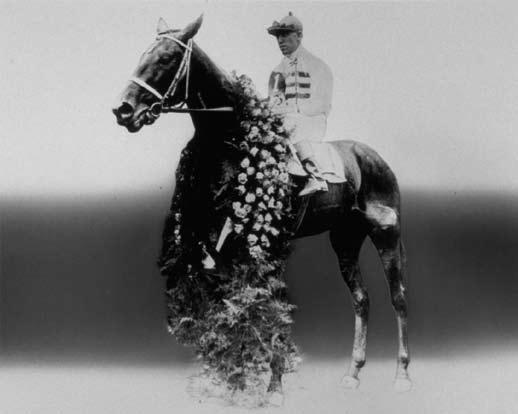
- Behave Yourself after winning the 1921 Kentucky Derby
- Sire: Marathon
- Grandsire: Martagon
- Dam: Miss Ringlets
- Damsire: Handball
- Sex: Stallion
- Foaled: 1918
- Country: United States
- Colour: Bay
- Breeder: Edward R. Bradley
- Owner: Edward R. Bradley
- Trainer: Herbert J. Thompson
- Record: 18: 4-2-1
- Earnings: $58,772

Major wins
- Queen City Handicap (1920); Triple Crown Race wins: Kentucky Derby (1921)

Behave Yourself (1918–1937), by Marathon out of Miss Ringlets (by Handball), was an American Thoroughbred racehorse. He was one of four Kentucky Derby winners owned by Colonel Edward R. Bradley and was the upset winner of the 1921 Kentucky Derby over his stablemate Black Servant (also owned by Bradley).

== Racing career: Kentucky Derby ==
Compared with Black Servant (a Blue Grass Stakes winner) Behave Yourself was a mediocre racehorse, only winning four races in his career. Behave Yourself's Derby win was very close and may have resulted from Black Servant's distraction by a spectator's hat thrown onto the track or, possibly, by Behave Yourself's jockey being overeager to win. It was rumored that Edward R. Bradley was unhappy that his horse won because he ultimately lost money on the win (by betting heavily on Black Servant instead). Bradley also owned the sire of Black Servant, Black Toney, and may have lost stud fees from the inferior colt's win.

== Stud record ==
Behave Yourself was not considered a good sire, but he was rarely given the opportunity to breed because Bradley thought he had poorly conformed legs and did not want the trait to be perpetuated in his offspring. Bradley donated Behave Yourself to the United States Army cavalry remount service in 1930. He spent his remaining years, until his death in 1937, siring cavalry horses for the Army. He is buried in Cheyenne, Wyoming at the Mark T. Cox ranch.

== See also ==
- Edward R. Bradley
- Kentucky Derby
- Thoroughbred
