= Brokers Tip =

American-bred Thoroughbred racehorse

- Sire: Black Toney
- Grandsire: Peter Pan
- Dam: Forteresse
- Damsire: Sardanapale
- Sex: Stallion
- Foaled: 1930
- Country: United States
- Colour: Brown
- Breeder: Idle Hour Stock Farm
- Owner: Edward R. Bradley; Silks: White, Green Hoops, White Sleeves, Green Cap
- Trainer: Herbert J. Thompson
- Record: 14: 1-2-1
- Earnings: $49,600

Major wins
- U.S. Triple Crown series: Kentucky Derby (1933)

Honours
- Interred on the Kentucky Derby Museum grounds at Churchill Downs

Brokers Tip (March 16, 1930 – July 14, 1953), by Black Toney out of the French mare Forteresse, was a Thoroughbred racehorse and the only horse in history whose sole win was in the Kentucky Derby.

== Kentucky Derby ==
His Derby win went down in history as the "Fighting Finish" because Brokers Tip's jockey (Don Meade) and Herb Fisher (the jockey aboard rival Head Play) literally fought one another atop their mounts down the homestretch. In an era before photo finishes, Brokers Tip was declared the winner by a nose.

== Retirement and stud record ==
Retired to stud duty, Brokers Tip was standing at stud in California in December 1941 when his stature as a stallion increased considerably as a result of the 1941 successes of his son Market Wise, who went on to earn 1943 American Co-Champion Older Male Horse honors.

Brokers Tip was donated to UC Davis in 1950 by then-owner Ralph Taylor for veterinary instructional purposes. Brokers Tip, at age 23, was euthanized on July 14, 1953, due to problems associated with old age. His skeleton was preserved for future study at the University of California.

== Sire line tree ==
- Brokers Tip
  - Market Wise
    - To Market
      - High Bid
      - Oink
      - Viking Spirit
      - Hurry to Market
        - A Letter To Harry
      - Rising Market
    - Wise Margin

== See also ==
- Idle Hour Stock Farm
- Kentucky Derby
- Market Wise
