= Bimelech =

American-bred Thoroughbred racehorse

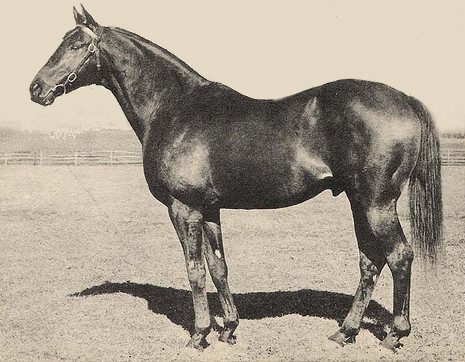
- Sire: Black Toney
- Grandsire: Peter Pan
- Dam: La Troienne (FR)
- Damsire: Teddy (FR)
- Sex: Stallion
- Foaled: 1937
- Country: United States
- Colour: Bay
- Breeder: Colonel E. R. Bradley
- Owner: Idle Hour Stock Farm
- Racing colors: White, green hoops and cap
- Trainer: William A. "Bill" Hurley
- Record: 15: 11-2-1
- Earnings: $248,745

Major wins
- Saratoga Special Stakes (1939); Hopeful Stakes (1939); Belmont Futurity Stakes (1939); Pimlico Futurity (1939); Blue Grass Stakes (1940); Derby Trial Stakes (1940) American Classic Race wins: Preakness Stakes (1940); Belmont Stakes (1940)

Awards
- American Champion 2-Year-Old Colt (1939); American Champion 3-Year-Old Male Horse (1940)

Honours
- U.S. Racing Hall of Fame (1990) #84 - Top 100 U.S. Racehorses of the 20th Century
- Last updated on November 4, 2006

Bimelech (February 27, 1937 – 1966) was a champion Thoroughbred racehorse who won two Triple Crown races and was a Champion at both age two and three. He was ranked #84 among U.S. racehorses of the 20th century. After retiring to stud, he sired 30 stakes winners and his daughters produced 50 stakes winners.

== Early life ==
Bimelech was foaled at Colonel E. R. Bradley's Idle Hour Stock Farm near Lexington, Kentucky. Colonel Bradley named this latest La Troienne foal after a friend, John Harris, who went by the nickname Abimelech. He dropped the "A" because he gave his horses names that began with a "B". Bimelech was the last colt sired by Bradley's major stallion, Black Toney, and was a full brother to Black Helen, the 1935 Champion three-year-old filly. (Black Toney was also the sire of Hall of Famer Black Gold.)

== Racing career ==
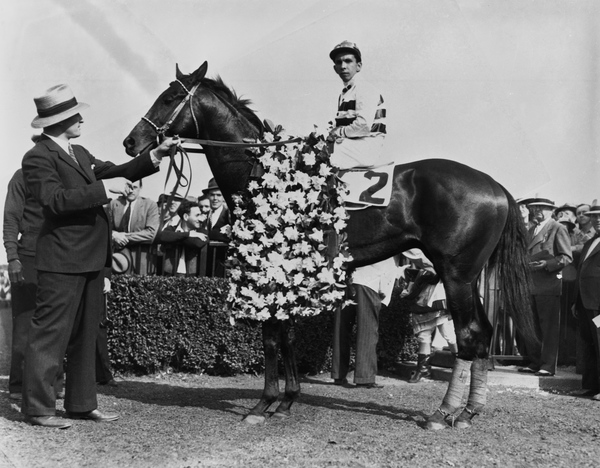
Bimelech after his 1940 Belmont Stakes win

Bimelech was undefeated as a two-year-old, winning his first over maidens at Suffolk Downs by three lengths. In his next race, an allowance at Empire City, he wired the field. Bimelech's first stakes race was at Saratoga Race Course, where he defeated Briar Sharp and Andy K. in the Saratoga Special Stakes. He then went on to win the Hopeful Stakes by a neck. He ended his first season with a length and a half victory in the Belmont Futurity Stakes and a four length win in the Pimlico Futurity. Bimelech was named American Champion Two-Year-Old Colt. He was also the Experimental Free Handicap Highweight at 130 pounds, a prodigious weight for a young horse.

He became the favorite to win the 1940 Kentucky Derby; his winterbook odds of three to one were the lowest odds ever quoted for a Derby favorite up to that time.

In his first race as a three-year-old, Bimelech took the Blue Grass Stakes by two and a half lengths. He then won the Derby Trial Stakes, beating a colt from Milky Way Farm Stable called Gallahadion.

Still undefeated, Bimelech was the overwhelming choice for the Derby, which had had its purse raised to $75,000 added. It was his third start in 8 days. At six to one, Charles S. Howard's Mioland was the bettor's second choice. (Howard owned and raced the famous Seabiscuit.) Gallahadion was thirty-five to one.

In the Derby, Bimelech drifted farther and farther out from the rail and ran wide the entire race. The longer distance left him exhausted in the last few furlongs. Gallahadion passed him in the final furlong. Bimelech's jockey, Fred Smith, took the blame for the loss.

A short time later, Bimelech beat Gallahadion in the Preakness. He ran second in the Withers Stakes, but records indicate this was due to poor preparation. So after the Withers, Bimelech went into heavy training and won the Belmont Stakes. He struggled to win his next race, and it was discovered he was racing with an injured foot, which ended his racing that year. He took that year's honor of American Champion Three-Year-Old Male Horse.

When the new starting gates were introduced, Bimelech acted very badly while being loaded into the gate. After two races, Bradley retired his horse, fearing Bimelech would hurt himself.

== Stud record ==
In 1946, Bradley died and all his horses were sold. A syndicate (Greentree Stud, King Ranch, and Ogden Phipps) bought Bimelech. They stood him at Greentree Stud, where he sired 30 stakes winners, including these multiple stakes-winners:

- Alfoxie, won Laurel Stakes and Jasmine Stakes
- Bassanio, won Monmouth Handicap and USA Sussex Handicap
- Be Faithful, won Beverly Handicap (twice) etc.; was the second dam of Never Bend.
- Better Self, won Saratoga Handicap etc.; the damsire of Dr. Fager.
- Blue Border, won Palm Beach Handicap and Shevlin Stakes etc.
- Bradley, won Great American Stakes and Sanford Stakes
- Brookfield (Domino Handicap and Wilmington Handicap)
- Burning Dream (American Handicap and San Francisco County Handicap)
- Bymeabond (Santa Anita Derby and San Jose Handicap)
- Getthere Jack (Great American Stakes and Tremont Stakes)
- Guillotine (Lincoln's Birthday Handicap and Futurity Stakes etc.)
- Jabneh (Hialeah Turf Handicap, Longfellow Handicap)
- Laugh (USA Albany Stakes and Flash Stakes)
- Torch Of War (Churchill Downs Handicap and USA de Soto Handicap)
- Well Away (La Centinela Stakes and Yo Tambien Handicap)

Daughters of Bimelech produced 50 stakes winners. Bimelech died in 1966.

== Legacy ==
Bimelech was inducted into the National Museum of Racing and Hall of Fame in 1990. In the Blood-Horse magazine List of Top 100 Racehorses of the 20th Century, Bimelech was ranked number 84.

== Sire line tree ==
- Bimelech
  - Brookfield
    - Invigorator
  - Burning Dream
  - Bymeabond
  - Blue Border
  - Better Self
    - Time Tested
      - Az Igazi
  - Guillotine
  - Bassanio
  - Bradley
  - Hilarious
    - Fast Hilarious
      - Hail Hilarious
  - Torch Of War
  - Jabneh
  - Laugh
  - Getthere Jack

== Pedigree ==
Pedigree of Bimelech (USA), bay stallion, 1937
Sire Black Toney (USA) 1911	Peter Pan (USA); 1904	Commando	Domino
Sire Black Toney (USA) 1911	Peter Pan (USA); 1904	Commando	Emma C.
Sire Black Toney (USA) 1911	Peter Pan (USA); 1904	Cinderella	Hermit
Sire Black Toney (USA) 1911	Peter Pan (USA); 1904	Cinderella	Mazurka
Sire Black Toney (USA) 1911	Belgravia (USA); 1903	Ben Brush	Bramble
Sire Black Toney (USA) 1911	Belgravia (USA); 1903	Ben Brush	Roseville
Sire Black Toney (USA) 1911	Belgravia (USA); 1903	Bonnie Gal	Galopin
Sire Black Toney (USA) 1911	Belgravia (USA); 1903	Bonnie Gal	Bonnie Doon
Dam La Troienne (FR) 1926	Teddy (FR); 1913	Ajax	Flying Fox
Dam La Troienne (FR) 1926	Teddy (FR); 1913	Ajax	Amie
Dam La Troienne (FR) 1926	Teddy (FR); 1913	Rondeau	Bay Ronald
Dam La Troienne (FR) 1926	Teddy (FR); 1913	Rondeau	Doremi
Dam La Troienne (FR) 1926	Helene de Troie (FR); 1916	Helicon	Cyllene
Dam La Troienne (FR) 1926	Helene de Troie (FR); 1916	Helicon	Vain Duchess
Dam La Troienne (FR) 1926	Helene de Troie (FR); 1916	Lady of Pedigree	St. Denis
Dam La Troienne (FR) 1926	Helene de Troie (FR); 1916	Lady of Pedigree	Doxa (Family: 1-x)
