= Edward R. Bradley =

American businessman and racehorse breeder

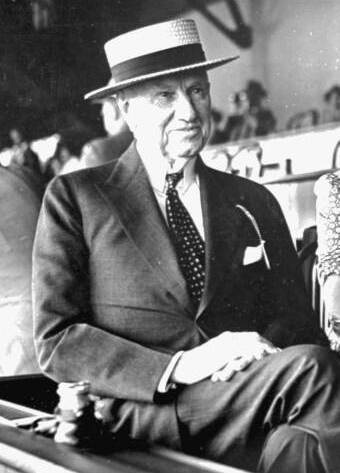
- Bradley pictured at Saratoga, 1940
- Born: December 12, 1859; Johnstown, Pennsylvania, U.S.
- Died: August 15, 1946 (aged 86); Lexington, Kentucky, U.S.
- Resting place: Calvary Cemetery, Lexington
- Occupations: Businessman: Casino operator Racehorse owner/breeder Racetrack owner, philanthropist
- Spouse: Agnes Cecilia Curry
- Parent: none
- Awards: Kentucky colonel Fair Grounds Racing Hall of Fame (1971)

Edward Riley Bradley (December 12, 1859 – August 15, 1946) was an American steel mill laborer, gold miner, businessman and philanthropist. As well as a race track proprietor, he was the preeminent owner and breeder of Thoroughbred racehorses in the Southern United States during the first three decades of the 20th century. Testifying before a United States Senate committee in April 1934, Bradley identified himself as a "speculator, raiser of race horses and gambler". He appeared on the cover of Time magazine on May 7, 1934. In the year 2000, the Florida Department of State honored him as one of their Great Floridians.

== Biography ==
Born in Johnstown, Pennsylvania of Irish descent. His ancestors were from Draperstown, County Londonderry, Ireland. At age fourteen, Edward Bradley was working as a roller in a steel mill before heading for Texas in 1874 to work on a ranch. During the Wild West era he worked as a cowboy, a scout for General Nelson A. Miles during the Indian War campaigns and was a friend of Wyatt Earp.

Bradley become successful as a gambler and eventually established a bookmaking partnership that served horse racing bettors at race tracks in Hot Springs, Arkansas, Memphis, Tennessee and in St. Louis, Missouri where he married a local woman, Agnes Cecilia Curry. He eventually moved to Chicago, Illinois where he would own a hotel, and probably a sports betting operation, and maintain business interests for the remainder of his life.

By 1891, Bradley had accumulated considerable wealth. He moved to St. Augustine where he worked in real estate. In 1898, he moved him to build the Beach Club on Lake Worth Lagoon in Palm Beach. The exclusive restaurant and private gambling casino made him wealthy and he would expand operations to New Orleans, Louisiana with the opening of the Palmetto Club.

In 1898, Edward Bradley purchased his first racehorse which quickly led to the acquisition of others. In 1906, he bought Ash Grove Stock Farm, a 400-acre (1.6 km^{2}) property near Lexington, Kentucky which he renamed Idle Hour Stock Farm. This became the leading Thoroughbred breeding operation in the American South and added greatly to the rise of Kentucky as the most important horse breeding state in America and the Kentucky Derby as the country's premier race.

At Idle Hour Stock farm, Bradley built first-class stables and breeding and training facilities. Bradley introduced the fibre skullcap worn by jockeys and as a racetrack owner made improvements to the starting gates.

All of his horses were given a name that began with the Bradley "B". His stallion Black Toney, purchased from James R. Keene in 1912, became the farm's first important sire. In December 1930, Bradley purchased the French mare La Troienne, who had been consigned by owner Marcel Boussac to the Newmarket, England Sales.

Over the years, Bradley's horses were conditioned for racing by several trainers such as Willie Knapp and Edward Haughton, but William A. "Bill" Hurley and future U.S. Racing Hall of Fame trainer Herbert J. Thompson met with the most success.

Bill Hurley trained Kalitan, who won the 1917 Preakness Stakes, and Bagenbaggage, who won the 1926 Latonia and Louisiana Derbys and was second to Bradley's own Bubbling Over in the Kentucky Derby. Hurley won the 1935 Florida Derby, Coaching Club American Oaks and American Derby with the great filly and 1991 Racing Hall of Fame inductee Black Helen. Another of Bill Hurley's important Hall of Fame horses was Bimelech, who earned U.S. Champion 2-Yr-Old Colt and 3-Year-Old honors in 1939 and 1940 respectively, and just missed winning the U.S. Triple Crown when he finished second in the 1940 Kentucky Derby, then won both the Preakness and Belmont Stakes.

Bradley was an owner of the Palmetto Club in New Orleans, Louisiana, which serviced a betting clientele for local horse races. In 1926, Edward Bradley purchased the Fair Grounds Race Course. In 1932, after making a substantial investment in Joseph E. Widener's new Hialeah Park Race Track near Miami, Florida, The Colonel E.R. Bradley Handicap is named in his memory and is raced annually in January at the Fair Grounds Race Course. In 1971, he was part of the inaugural class of inductees into the Fair Grounds Racing Hall of Fame.

Herbert Thompson trained Bradley horses that won numerous important stakes race including four Kentucky Derbys, two of which were the first-ever back-to-back wins by a trainer or by an owner. Thompson won one of the Derbys with Burgoo King in 1932, who also won that year's Preakness Stakes. The most important horse Thompson trained for Edward Bradley was Blue Larkspur. The colt won the 1929 Belmont Stakes and was voted United States Horse of the Year honors and in 1930, U.S. Champion Older Male Horse.

== Horse races ==
Edward Bradley's wins in the American Classic Races were as follows:

Kentucky Derby

- 1921 - Behave Yourself
- 1926 - Bubbling Over
- 1932 - Burgoo King
- 1933 - Brokers Tip

Preakness Stakes

- 1917 - Kalitan
- 1932 - Burgoo King
- 1940 - Bimelech

Belmont Stakes

- 1929 - Blue Larkspur
- 1940 - Bimelech

Edward Bradley raced horses at Arlington Park in Chicago as well as in New York, where Thoroughbred racing flourished at several race tracks near New York City and on Long Island. In addition to two wins in the prestigious Belmont Stakes, his horses won other important New York area races such as the:

- Jerome Handicap (1920)
- Withers Stakes (1929)
- Matron Stakes (1930, 1932, 1935, 1944)
- Alabama Stakes (1933)
- Adirondack Stakes (1934, 1935, 1944)
- Champagne Stakes (1934)
- Saratoga Special Stakes (1934, 1939)
- Test Stakes (1934)
- Coaching Club American Oaks (1935)
- Belmont Futurity (1939)
- Saranac Handicap (1942)
- Beldame Stakes (1946)
- Frizette Stakes (1946)
- Gazelle Handicap (1946)

Bradley was given the honorific title of Kentucky Colonel by the Governor.

== Philanthropy ==
Edward Bradley and his wife Agnes had no children but donated money to orphanages. Annually in the fall, they held a racing day at Idle Hour Farm to raise money that was donated to various orphanages. They provided funding to various charitable causes such as the Good Samaritan Medical Center and St. Mary's Medical Center in West Palm Beach.

His wife died in 1926 and Bradley bequeathed much of their Palm Beach property and personal residence to the city on the condition the land be used as a public park. Seven and 3/4 acres of lakefront property were bequeathed to St. Ann's parish along with the wish that it be used as a school for girls. The school that opened in 1926 was named St-Ann-on-the-Lake in honor of Bradley's wife, although later it changed its name to Rosarian Academy. Honored in 2000 as one of its "Great Floridians" by the Florida Department of State, his Great Floridian commemorative plaque is located at E.R. Bradley's Saloon at 104 Clematis Street in West Palm Beach.

Edward R. Bradley died at Idle Hour Stock Farm on August 15, 1946, at age 86. He was buried next to his wife in Lexington's Calvary Cemetery.
