= Idle Hour Stock Farm =

Thoroughbred breeding farm (1906–1946)

Coordinates: 38°05′18″N 84°34′16″W

Idle Hour Stock Farm was a 400-acre (1.6 km^{2}) thoroughbred horse breeding and training farm near Lexington, Kentucky, United States established in 1906 by Colonel Edward R. Bradley.

Beginning with the sire, Black Toney, and a roster of quality broodmares, Idle Hour Farm bred great champions such as the 1929 Horse of the Year Blue Larkspur and the Champion Three-Year-Old Colt, Bimelech. In 1931, the farm acquired the mare La Troienne from noted French breeder Marcel Boussac. La Troienne became one of the most influential mares to be imported into the U.S. in the 20th century. Her offspring produced champions including Idle Hour Farm's Bimlech, and its own two-year-old Champion Filly of 1944 and the 1945 Horse of the Year, Busher who was sold to movie mogul Louis B. Mayer. Later generation champions such as Buckpasser and Easy Goer trace their line to La Troienne.

As well, under farm manager Louis Olin Gentry and future Hall of Fame trainer "Derby Dick" Thompson, and later trainer Bill Hurley, the farm raced horses that won numerous major stakes races, including multiple winners in each of the U.S. Triple Crown events.

As part of a program honoring important horse racing tracks and racing stables, the Pennsylvania Railroad named its baggage car #5846 the "Idle Hour Stock Farm".

After Colonel Bradley's death in 1946, Ogden Phipps purchased a group of Idle Hour's bloodstock that became the basis for what became Phipps' major horse racing operation. Allen T. Simmons purchased Idle Hour Farm at auction and the property was divided into smaller parcels. The portion on the southern side of Old Frankfort Pike was purchased by King Ranch while a southern parcel was sold to Dan and Ada Rice and became a satellite operation of their Danada Farm in Wheaton, Illinois. The core of the farm, on the north side of Old Frankfort Pike, was bought by Edward S. Moore who called it Circle M Farm. Moore owned it for only a short time before selling it to the John W. Galbreath family in 1949 who renamed it Darby Dan Farm.

Major race victories (partial list)

- Kentucky Derby - (1921, 1926, 1932, 1933)
- Preakness Stakes - (1932, 1940)
- Belmont Stakes - (1929, 1940)
- Saratoga Special Stakes - (1928, 1934, 1939)
- Hopeful Stakes - (1933, 1939, 1946)
