= 1934 Kentucky Derby =

Horse race

60th Kentucky Derby
- Kentucky Derby
- Grade I stakes race
- Location: Churchill Downs
- Date: May 5, 1934
- Winning horse: Cavalcade
- Jockey: Mack Garner
- Trainer: Robert A. Smith
- Owner: Brookmeade Stable
- Surface: Dirt

The 1934 Kentucky Derby was the 60th running of the Kentucky Derby. The race took place on May 5, 1934. The win by the Brookmeade Stable of Isabel Dodge Sloane marked the fifth time in Derby history that a woman was the winning owner. Horses Prince Pompey, Thomasville, Howard, Blue Again, & Riskulus were scratched before the race.

== Full results ==
Finished	Post	Horse	Jockey	Trainer	Owner	Time / behind
1st	8	Cavalcade	Mack Garner	Robert Augustus Smith	Brookmeade Stable	2:04.00
2nd	6	Discovery	John Bejshak	Joseph H. Stotler	Alfred Gwynne Vanderbilt Jr.	
3rd	9	Agrarian	Charles Kurtsinger	George H. Strate	Mrs. Frank J. Heller	
4th	3	Mata Hari	John Gilbert	Clyde Van Dusen	Dixiana Stable	
5th	2	Peace Chance	Wayne D. Wright	Pete Coyne	Joseph E. Widener	
6th	11	Spy Hill	Silvio Coucci	Marshall Lilly	Greentree Stable	
7th	1	Time Clock	Dominick Bellizzi	Robert Augustus Smith	Brookmeade Stable	
8th	7	Singing Wood	Robert Jones	James W. Healy	Mary E. Whitney	
9th	12	Bazaar	Don Meade	Herbert J. Thompson	Edward R. Bradley	
10th	5	Speedmore	Francis Horn	Clarence Buxton	Jerome H. Louchheim	
11th	10	Sgt. Byrne	Sam Renick	James Ritchie	John Simonetti	
12th	4	Sir Thomas	Anthony Pascuma	Albert B. Gordon	Albert B. Gordon	
13th	13	Quasimodo	J. H. James Burke	Allie C. Dettwiler	Mrs. Bessie Franzheim	

- Winning breeder: F. Wallis Armstrong (NJ)
