= Chesapeake Stakes =

Horse race in Maryland, United States

- Class: Discontinued stakes
- Location: Havre de Grace Racetrack, Havre de Grace, Maryland, United States
- Inaugurated: 1920
- Race type: Thoroughbred - flat racing

Race information
- Distance: 1 1/16 miles (8.5 furlongs)
- Surface: Dirt
- Track: Left-handed
- Qualification: Three-year-olds

The Chesapeake Stakes was an important American Thoroughbred horse race for three-year-old horses of either sex contested on dirt over a distance of a mile and one-sixteenth at Havre de Grace Racetrack in Havre de Grace, Maryland. Run from 1920 until the track closed after the 1950 edition, the race usually run in late April race was a last major prep before the Kentucky Derby. For owners who had not nominated their horse for the Derby it was a chance to test their horse's ability against some of the best three-year-olds in the country, a number of which they would undoubtedly encounter in the ensuing Preakness Stakes.

== Historical notes ==
The first two editions of the Chesapeake Stakes were run at a mile and 70 yards. The April 24, 1920 inaugural brought together a field of six runners that included Harry Whitney's Wildair as well as the betting public's heavy favorite, an entry of Blazes and Paul Jones owned by Ral Parr. However, the race saw a stunning upset by a 42:1 longshot named Sandy Beal who was skilfully ridden by future Hall of Fame jockey James Butwell. Paul Jones went on to win the 1920 Kentucky Derby.

The filly Careful, owned by Walter Salmon, won the second running in 1921. She would earn that year's American Co-Champion Two-Year-Old Filly honors and in 1922 be named American Champion Older Female Horse.

Considered one of the top two-year-olds of 1921, Harry Whitney's Bunting had won three of six starts highlighted by a win in the prestigious Belmont Futurity Stakes. On April 29, 1922, Bunting made his first start of the year a winning one when he captured the Chesapeake Stakes at Havre de Grace Racetrack.

Harry Whitney got his second Chesapeake Stakes win in 1927 with Whiskery who went on to win the Kentucky Derby and earn American Champion Three-Year-Old Male Horse honors.

Mr. Khayyam, owned by the Catawba Stable of Madelaine Austin, won the 1933 Chesapeake Stakes. A son of the 1917 Kentucky Derby winner Omar Khayyam, Mr. Khayyam won by six lengths while setting a new track record time of 1:44 flat for the mile and one-sixteenth on dirt.

The 1934 Chesapeake Stakes was won Cavalcade who defeated future Hall of Fame inductee Discovery in a new track record time for a mile and one-sixteenth of 1:43 3/5. Owned by the Brookmeade Stable of automobile heiress Isabel Dodge Sloane, Cavalcade was the second Chesapeake winner to go on to win the Kentucky Derby in which he beat Discovery for the second straight time.

A 1936 Daily Racing Form article referred to the Chesapeake as a "proving ground" and the "Kentucky Derby Chances of Eligibles Hinge on Showing" in the Chesapeake Stakes. A colt named War Admiral liked racing at the Havre de Grace track having won the 1936 Eastern Shore Handicap by five lengths in stakes record time. On his return to Havre de Grace on April 26, 1937, War Admiral won the Chesapeake Stakes with ease, beating William du Pont Jr.'s Santa Anita Derby winner Fairy Hill as well as Flamingo Stakes victor, Court Scandal. War Admiral went on to become the fourth horse in history to win the U.S. Triple Crown.

In the 1939 edition of the Chesapeake Stakes, Gilded Knight defeated future Hall of Fame inductee Challedon as well as Porter's Mite, the 1938 Belmont Futurity winner.

World War II saw racing restricted in the United States and Havre de Grace Racetrack was forced to cancel all of its spring races in 1943 which included the Chesapeake Stakes. Due to the ongoing federal government's wartime gasoline rationing, all four of Maryland's major racetracks had to consolidate their races into a reduced schedule at the Pimlico Race Course facility where the Chesapeake stakes would be run in 1944. The following year the consolidated racing at Pimlico continued but the Chesapeake Stakes was not held.

From the 1948 running of the Chesapeake Stakes emerged another U.S. Triple Crown Champion. Calumet Farm's Citation had lost his regular jockey when Albert Snider and two horse racing industry associates disappeared on March 5, 1948, during a sudden tropical storm while fishing in the Florida Keys. Despite a massive search effort, their bodies were never found. With replacement jockey Eddie Arcaro aboard, Citation was beaten by Saggy in the 1948 Chesapeake Trial that ended the colt's seven-race win streak. In time, that loss would prove to be very important as Citation next won the Chesapeake Stakes which marked the first win of a new win streak that ended in a record setting sixteen straight wins that could instead have been twenty-four.

The 1949 Chesapeake Stakes was won by Capot who defeated Slam Bang by a nose. Owned by the Greentree Stables of Helen Hay Whitney, Capot would have a great three-year-old campaign in which he won the 1949 Preakness and Belmont Stakes. He earned American Champion Three-Year-Old Male Horse and DRF Horse of the Year honors.

The twenty-ninth and final running of Havre de Grace's Chesapeake Stakes took place on April 15, 1950, with a field of sixteen runners. The race was won for the second time by the Brookmeade Stable with their colt Sunglow whose stablemate and Louisiana Derby winner Greek Ship finished second. Sunglow next ran fourth in the Kentucky Derby before going on to win a number of top level races. However, Sunglow's most significant impact on Thoroughbred racing was as the sire of 1959 American Horse of the Year and 1977 Hall of Fame inductee Sword Dancer.

Havre de Grace Racetrack was closed permanently at the end of the spring meeting. The next year, Laurel Park would use the Chesapeake Stakes name for a race of their own.

== Records ==
Speed record:

- 1:43 3/5 @ 1 1/16 miles: Rock Man (1926) & Cavalcade (1934)

Most wins by a jockey:

- 2 - James Butwell (1920, 1923)
- 2 - George Woolf (1940, 1942)
- 2 - Charles Kurtsinger (1931, 1937)
- 2 - Eddie Arcaro (1946, 1948)

Most wins by a trainer:

- 2 - James G. Rowe Jr. (1922, 1931)
- 2 - Preston M. Burch (1929, 1950)
- 2 - Richard E. Handlen (1936, 1946)

Most wins by an owner:

- 3 - Greentree Stable (1931, 1935, 1949)

== Winners ==
Year	Winner	Age	Jockey	Trainer	Owner	Dist. (Miles)	Time	Win$
1950	Sunglow	3	Jack Robertson	Preston M. Burch	Brookmeade Stable	11/16 m	1:46.00	$18,725
1949	Capot	3	Ted Atkinson	John M. Gaver Sr.	Greentree Stable	11/16 m	1:45.20	$24,550
1948	Citation	3	Eddie Arcaro	Horace A. Jones	Calumet Farm	11/16 m	1:45.80	$19,750
1947	Bullet Proof	3	Wayne D. Wright	Henry S. Clark	Mary Elizabeth Whitney	11/16 m	1:44.80	$28,300
1946	Hampden	3	Eddie Arcaro	Richard E. Handlen	Foxcatcher Farm	11/16 m	1:53.00	$19,450
1945	Race not held due to wartime restrictions							
1944	Gramps Image	3	Leonard Bowers	Albert "Whitey" Abel	Dorothy Abel	11/16 m	1:46.20	$24,700
1943	Race not held due to wartime restrictions							
1942	Colchis	3	George Woolf	Vincent G. Mara	R. Sterling Clark	11/16 m	1:46.60	$13,350
1941	Porter's Cap	3	Buddy Haas	Tom Smith	Charles S. Howard	11/16 m	1:45.20	$12,600
1940	Pictor	3	George Woolf	Louis J. Schaefer	William L. Brann	11/16 m	1:53.00	$12,800
1939	Gilded Knight	3	Ruperto Donoso	James E. Fitzsimmons	Wheatley Stable	11/16 m	1:45.60	$12,800
1938	Bourbon King	3	Raymond Workman	Duval A. Headley	Hal Price Headley	11/16 m	1:45.20	$12,700
1937	War Admiral	3	Charles Kurtsinger	George H. Conway	Glen Riddle Farm	11/16 m	1:45.00	$8,250
1936	Gold Seeker	3	Maurice Peters	Richard E. Handlen	William du Pont Jr.	11/16 m	1:46.20	$8,425
1935	Plat Eye	3	Silvio Coucci	William Brennan	Greentree Stable	11/16 m	1:46.20	$6,900
1934	Cavalcade	3	Mack Garner	Robert A. Smith	Brookmeade Stable	11/16 m	1:43.60	$6,750
1933	Mr. Khayyam	3	Pete Walls	Matthew P. Brady	Catawba Stable (Madelaine H. Austin)	11/16 m	1:44.00	$7,475
1932	Evening	3	Robert Leishman	A. Jack Joyner	George D. Widener Jr.	11/16 m	1:46.40	$10,850
1931	Anchors Aweigh	3	Charles Kurtsinger	James G. Rowe Jr.	Greentree Stable	11/16 m	1:46.80	$9,950
1930	Sweet Sentiment	3	Paul McGinnis	E. J. Scott	Seagram Stables	11/16 m	1:45.80	$10,150
1929	Voltear	3	Eddie Legere	Preston M. Burch	Dixiana Farm Stable	11/16 m	1:45.80	$9,150
1928	Bobashela	3	Herb Fisher	S. Miller Henderson	Audley Farm Stable	11/16 m	1:45.20	$9,250
1927	Whiskery	3	Louis Schaefer	Fred Hopkins	Harry Payne Whitney	11/16 m	1:47.20	$9,025
1926	Rock Man	3	Frank Coltiletti	Joseph H. Stotler	Sagamore Stable (Mrs. Raymond T. Baker)	11/16 m	1:43.60	$8,000
1925	Sweeping Away	3	John Maiben	Roy J. Waldron	Xalapa Farm Stable	11/16 m	1:47.40	$8,275
1924	Nautical	3	Jimmy Wallace	William M. Garth	Joshua S. Cosden	11/16 m	1:46.80	$3,350
1923	Wilderness	3	James Butwell	Thomas J. Healey	Richard T. Wilson Jr.	11/16 m	1:47.20	$3,750
1922	Bunting	3	Lewis Morris	James G. Rowe Jr.	Harry Payne Whitney	11/16 m	1:48.20	$3,325
1921	Careful	3	Clarence Turner	Eugene Wayland	Walter J. Salmon Sr.	1m, 70 yds	1:47.20	$3,450
1920	Sandy Beal	3	James Butwell	Nathaniel K. Beal	W. S. Murray	1m, 70 yds	1:45.20	$3,550
