= 1934 in sports =

1934 in sports describes the year's events in world sport.

== Alpine skiing ==
FIS Alpine World Ski Championships 4th FIS Alpine World Ski Championships are held at St Moritz, Switzerland. The events are a downhill, a slalom and a combined race in both the men's and women's categories. The winners are:

- Men's Downhill – David Zogg (Switzerland)
- Men's Slalom – Franz Pfnür (Germany)
- Men's Combined – David Zogg (Switzerland)
- Women's Downhill – Anny Rüegg (Switzerland)
- Women's Slalom – Christl Cranz (Germany)
- Women's Combined – Christl Cranz (Germany)

== American football ==
NFL championship

- The New York Giants defeat the Chicago Bears 30–13 at the Polo Grounds, which is known as the "Sneakers Game"

College championship

- College football national championship – Minnesota Golden Gophers and Alabama Crimson Tide (shared)

== Association football ==
International

- 1934 World Cup held in Italy – Italy defeats Czechoslovakia 2–1 in the final.
- 14 November – England defeats Italy 3–2 in the "Battle of Highbury".

England

- The Football League – Arsenal 59 points, Huddersfield 56, Tottenham 49, Derby 45, Manchester City 45, Sunderland 44
- FA Cup final – Manchester City 2 – 1 Portsmouth (Empire Stadium, Wembley, London)

Spain

- La Liga won by Athletic Bilbao

Germany

- National Championship won by Schalke 04

Italy

- Serie A won by Juventus

France

- French Division 1 won by FC Sète

== Athletics ==
- 9 June – Swiss runner Lina Aebersold sets a new world record in the women's 20 km walk in Zürich: 1:59:02.
- 9 – 11 August - 1934 Women's World Games, London
- 9 September – European Championships Marathon at Turin won by Arnas Toivonen (Finland) in a time of 2:52:29

== Australian rules football ==
VFL Premiership

- Richmond wins the 38th VFL Premiership, beating South Melbourne 19.14 (128) to 12.17 (89) at Melbourne Cricket Ground (MCG) in the 1934 VFL Grand Final

Brownlow Medal

- The annual Brownlow Medal is awarded to Dick Reynolds (Essendon)

South Australian National Football League

- 6 October – Glenelg win their first SANFL premiership, beating Port Adelaide 18.15 (123) to 16.18 (114)
- Magarey Medal awarded to “Blue” Johnson (Glenelg)

Western Australian National Football League

- 13 October – West Perth 11.7 (73) defeat East Fremantle 5.9 (39) for their sixth WANFL premiership
- Sandover Medal awarded to Sammy Clarke (Claremont-Cottesloe)

== Bandy ==
Sweden

- Championship final – Slottsbrons IF defeats IFK Uppsala 6–0 on the replay after a 1–1 tie in the first final.

== Baseball ==
=== Major League Baseball ===
- July 10 – In the second Major League Baseball All-Star Game, played at the Polo Grounds in New York City, left–handed pitcher Carl Hubbell sets a record by striking out Babe Ruth, Lou Gehrig, Jimmie Foxx, Al Simmons and Joe Cronin consecutively. The catcher was Gabby Hartnett and the American League won 9–7.
- October – St. Louis Cardinals defeat Detroit Tigers in the World Series, 4–3. Brothers Dizzy Dean and Paul Dean each won two games for the "Gas House Gang" Cardinals. The Detroit Tigers gave up a great battle in the series but fell short a game.

=== International ===
Australia

- August – The inaugural Claxton Shield is held in Adelaide, South Australia. The host South Australian team won the tournament, defeating New South Wales and Victoria.

Japan

- December 26 – Yomiuri Giants of Tokyo, officially founded, as first professional baseball club in Japan.

== Basketball ==
Events

- The South American Basketball Championship 1934 in Buenos Aires is won by Argentina.

== Boxing ==
Events

- 14 June – Max Baer defeats Primo Carnera by an eleventh-round technical knockout at Long Island City to win the World Heavyweight Championship

Lineal world champions

- World Heavyweight Championship – Primo Carnera → Max Baer
- World Light Heavyweight Championship – Maxie Rosenbloom → Bob Olin
- World Middleweight Championship – vacant
- World Welterweight Championship – Jimmy McLarnin → Barney Ross → Jimmy McLarnin
- World Lightweight Championship – Barney Ross → vacant
- World Featherweight Championship – vacant
- World Bantamweight Championship – Panama Al Brown
- World Flyweight Championship – vacant

== Canadian football ==
Grey Cup

- Sarnia Imperials defeat the Regina Roughriders 20–12

== Cricket ==
Events

- England undertake their first Test match tour of India, winning two Tests to nil
- 4 November – The inaugural Ranji Trophy begins with a match between Madras and Mysore at Chepauk, just over a year after Ranjitsinhji’s death.

England

- County Championship – Lancashire
- Minor Counties Championship – Lancashire Second Eleven
- Most runs – Harold Gibbons 2,654 @ 52.03 (HS 157)
- Most wickets – Tich Freeman 205 @ 23.18 (BB 8–103)
- Wisden Cricketers of the Year – Stan McCabe, Bill O‘Reilly, George Paine, Bill Ponsford, Jim Smith

Australia

- Sheffield Shield – Victoria
- Most runs – Don Bradman 1192 @ 132.44 (HS 253)
- Most wickets – Clarrie Grimmett 66 @ 21.83 (BB 7–57)

India

- Bombay Quadrangular – not contested

New Zealand

- Plunket Shield – Auckland

South Africa

- Currie Cup – Western Province

West Indies

- Inter-Colonial Tournament – Trinidad

== Cycling ==
Tour de France

- Antonin Magne wins the 28th Tour de France

Giro d'Italia

- Learco Guerra of Maino wins the 22nd Giro d'Italia

== Figure skating ==
World Figure Skating Championships

- World Men's Champion – Karl Schäfer
- World Women's Champion – Sonja Henie
- World Pairs Champions – Emília Rotter and László Szollás

== Golf ==
Events

- Inaugural Masters Tournament is held at Augusta National Golf Club in Georgia, USA. Until 1939, it is known as the Augusta National Invitational Tournament.

Men's professional

- Augusta National Invitational Tournament – Horton Smith
- U.S. Open – Olin Dutra
- British Open – Henry Cotton
- PGA Championship – Paul Runyan

Men's amateur

- British Amateur – Lawson Little
- U.S. Amateur – Lawson Little

Women's professional

- Women's Western Open – Marian McDougall

== Harness racing ==
USA

- Hambletonian – Lord Jim
- Kentucky Futurity – Princess Peg

== Horse racing ==
England

- Champion Hurdle – Chenango
- Cheltenham Gold Cup – Golden Miller
- Grand National – Golden Miller
- 1,000 Guineas Stakes – Campanula
- 2,000 Guineas Stakes – Colombo
- The Derby – Windsor Lad
- The Oaks – Light Brocade
- St. Leger Stakes – Windsor Lad

Australia

- Melbourne Cup – Peter Pan III

Canada

- King's Plate – Horometer

France

- Prix de l'Arc de Triomphe – Brantôme

Ireland

- Irish Grand National – Poolgowran
- Irish Derby Stakes – Patriot King and Primero^{[a]}

USA

- Kentucky Derby – Cavalcade
- Preakness Stakes – High Quest
- Belmont Stakes – Peace Chance

== Ice hockey ==
Stanley Cup

- Chicago Black Hawks defeat Detroit Red Wings 3 games to 1

Ice Hockey World Championships

Events

- 18 September – The Norwegian Ice Hockey Federation founded

== Multi-sport events ==
- 2nd British Empire Games held in London, England
- 10th Far Eastern Championship Games held in Manila

== Nordic skiing ==
FIS Nordic World Ski Championships

- 8th FIS Nordic World Ski Championships 1934 are held at Sollefteå, Sweden

== Rowing ==
The Boat Race

- 17 March — Cambridge wins the 86th Oxford and Cambridge Boat Race

== Rugby league ==
- 1933–34 Kangaroo tour of Great Britain
- 1934 New Zealand rugby league season
- 1934 NSWRFL season
- 1933–34 Northern Rugby Football League season / 1934–35 Northern Rugby Football League season

== Rugby union ==
- 47th Home Nations Championship series is won by England

== Snooker ==
- World Snooker Championship – Joe Davis beats Tom Newman 25–23

== Speed skating ==
Speed Skating World Championships

- Men's All-round Champion – Bernt Evensen (Norway)

== Tennis ==
Australia

- Australian Men's Singles Championship – Fred Perry (Great Britain) defeats Jack Crawford (Australia) 6–3, 7–5, 6–1
- Australian Women's Singles Championship – Joan Hartigan Bathurst (Australia) defeats Margaret Molesworth (Australia) 6–1, 6–4

England

- Wimbledon Men's Singles Championship – Fred Perry (Great Britain) defeats Jack Crawford (Australia) 6–3, 6–0, 7–5
- Wimbledon Women's Singles Championship – Dorothy Round Little (Great Britain) defeats Helen Jacobs (USA) 6–2, 5–7, 6–3

France

- French Men's Singles Championship – Gottfried von Cramm (Germany) defeats Jack Crawford (Australia) 6–4, 7–9, 3–6, 7–5, 6–3
- French Women's Singles Championship – Margaret Scriven Vivian (Great Britain) defeats Helen Jacobs (USA) 7–5, 4–6, 6–1

USA

- American Men's Singles Championship – Fred Perry (Great Britain) defeats Wilmer Allison (USA) 6–4, 6–3, 3–6, 1–6, 8–6
- American Women's Singles Championship – Helen Jacobs (USA) defeats Sarah Palfrey Cooke (USA) 6–1, 6–4

Davis Cup

- 1934 International Lawn Tennis Challenge – Great Britain at 4–1 United States at Centre Court, Wimbledon (grass) London, United Kingdom

== Yacht racing ==
- The New York Yacht Club retains the America's Cup as Rainbow defeats British challenger Endeavour, of the Royal Yacht Squadron, 4 races to 2

== Awards ==
- Associated Press Female Athlete of the Year – Virginia Van Wie, LPGA golf
- Associated Press Male Athlete of the Year – Dizzy Dean, Major League Baseball

== Notes ==
^{a} The Irish Derby Stakes was a dead heat.
