= Dominick Bellizzi =

American jockey

Personal information
- Born: c. 1912 New York
- Died: May 17, 1934 (aged 21)
- Resting place: Holy Sepulchre Cemetery, New Rochelle, New York
- Occupation: Jockey

Horse racing career
- Sport: Horse racing

Major racing wins
- Adirondack Stakes (1933); Arlington Futurity (1933); Huron Handicap (1933); Toboggan Handicap (1933); Whitney Handicap (1933); Wood Memorial Stakes (1934)

Significant horses
- Time Clock, High Quest, Psychic Bid
- Updated on August 5, 2007

Dominick Bellizzi (c. 1912 – 17 May 1934) was an American jockey who died at age 21 as a result of a horse racing accident. He was known as "The Duke".

Bellizzi was born in New York to Albanian immigrants Samuel and Teresa Bellizzi. An up-and-coming young jockey in Thoroughbred racing, during 1933 Bellizzi rode to victory in the Futurity at Chicago's Arlington Park for Charles T. Fisher's Dixiana Farm. Competing on the New York circuit, he won the Adirondack Stakes and for the prominent Brookmeade Stable, owned by heiress Isabel Dodge Sloane, he captured both the Toboggan Handicap and the Whitney Handicap.

In 1934, Bellizzi rode Brookmeade's colt High Quest to victory in the Wood Memorial Stakes, an important prep race for the Kentucky Derby. However, trainer Robert A. Smith opted to run the stable's Florida Derby winner Time Clock in the Derby and under Bellizzi, finished seventh.

A week after the Kentucky Derby, Bellizzi was back in New York where he rode Brookmeade's Psychic Bid in the Youthful Stakes at Jamaica Race Course. As the field turned for home, the promising but still immature two-year-old colt veered wide and when Bellizzi attempted to guide him back in, the bit slipped in the horse's mouth. The motion caused the young jockey to lose his balance and he was thrown from his mount into the path of several onrushing horses. Severely injured, Bellizzi was rushed to Marymount Hospital in Jamaica, Queens. He underwent surgery for his injuries, which included a broken spine and damage to his intestines. He died five days later, succumbing after a night of watching by his family who had begun to hope that he would recover.

Bellizzi, whose coffin was carried by 10 other jockeys as pallbearers, was buried in his jockey uniform.
