= 1929 Kentucky Derby =

Horse race

Kentucky Derby
- Kentucky Derby
- Location: Churchill Downs
- Date: May 18, 1929
- Winning horse: Clyde Van Dusen
- Jockey: J. Linus McAtee
- Trainer: Clyde Van Dusen
- Owner: Herbert P. Gardner
- Conditions: Muddy
- Surface: Dirt

The 1929 Kentucky Derby was the 55th running of the Kentucky Derby. The race was run on May 18, 1929.

== Payout ==
The Kentucky Derby Payout Schedule

Program Number	Horse Name	Win	Place	Show
25	Clyde Van Dusen	$8.00	$3.70	$3.06
5	Naishapur	–	$4.72	$3.26
16	Panchio	–	–	$3.50

== Field ==
Position	Post	Horse	Jockey	Trainer	Owner	Final Odds	Stake
1	20	Clyde Van Dusen	Linus McAtee	Clyde Van Dusen	Herbert P. Gardner	3.00	$53,950
2	4	Naishapur	Charles E. Allen	John B. McKee	Wilshire Stable	5.57	$6,000
3	13	Panchio	Frank Coltiletti	Charles E. Durnell	Three D's Stock Farm	8.44	$3,000
4	21	Blue Larkspur	Mack Garner	Herbert J. Thompson	Edward R. Bradley	1.71	$1,000
5	19	Windy City	Earl L. Pool	Mose Lowenstein	Fred M. Grabner	22.84	
6	1	Voltear	Steve O'Donnell	Preston M. Burch	Dixiana	18.42	
7	18	The Nut	Alfred Robertson	Joe Notter	Warm Stable	40.62	
8	14	Folking	Anthony Pascuma	George Garvin	H. Teller Archibald	8.44	
9	10	Karl Eitel	Robert Jones	Walter Scofield	John J. Coughlin	28.80	
10	5	Upset Lad	Frank Chiavetta	Willie Knapp	Belle Isle Stable	8.44	
11	9	Calf Roper	Lee Hardy	Charles E. Durnell	Three D's Stock Farm	8.44	
12	7	Minotaur	Floyd Halbert	C. F. Cherry	John R. Thompson	30.80	
13	15	Bay Beauty	Kall Horvath	Herbert J. THompson	Edward R. Bradley	1.71	
14	3	Chicatie	William Garner	Albert B. Gordon	Fair Stable	87.09	
15	12	Paul Bunyan	Otis Clelland	B. R. Johnson	L. M. Severson	8.44	
16	6	Essare	Danny Connelly	Joe Johnson	Jacques Stable	8.44	
17	8	Lord Braedalbane	Willie Crump	Charles C. Van Meter	Desha Breckinridge	8.44	
18	16	Ben Machree	Alf Abel	A. D. Steele	C. C. & G. Y. Hieatt	8.44	
19	11	Chip	Jake Heupel	J. Thomas Taylor	Mrs. E. L. Swikard	8.44	
20	17	Prince Pat	Oren Laidley	Charles E. Durnell	Three D's Stock Farm	8.44	
21	2	Paraphrase	Willie Fronk	Walter W. Taylor	Hal Price Headley	8.44	

- Winning Breeder: Herbert P. Gardner; (KY)

- Margins – 2 lengths
- Time – 2:10 4/5
- Track – Muddy
