= Eastern Shore Stakes =

Former horse race in Maryland, US

- Class: Discontinued Stakes
- Location: Havre de Grace Racetrack, Havre de Grace, Maryland, United States
- Inaugurated: 1913
- Race type: Thoroughbred - Flat racing

Race information
- Distance: 4.5 furlongs
- Surface: Dirt
- Track: left-handed
- Qualification: Two-year-olds

The Eastern Shore Stakes was an American Thoroughbred horse race run between 1913 and 1949 at Havre de Grace Racetrack, in Havre de Grace, Maryland. A race for two-year-old horses of either sex, it was inaugurated and run for most of its existence as the Eastern Shore Handicap.

== Distances ==
The Eastern Shore Stakes has been run at various distances with thirty of its thirty-seven runnings at its longest distance of six furlongs.

- 6 furlongs: 1916, 1918–1945
- 5.5 furlongs: 1913–1915, 1917, 1948
- 5 furlongs: 1946–1947
- 4.5 furlongs: 1949

== Historical notes ==
On September 23, 1913, Tranid won the five and one-half furlong inaugural running of the Eastern Shore Handicap by two lengths for owner Schuyler L. Parsons. Tranid was trained by William H. Karrick and ridden by his son Kenneth.

Hourless, bred in France and foaled in England, was brought to race in the United States by his prominent owner and breeder, August Belmont Jr. In addition to winning the 1916 Eastern Shore Handicap, he won with three other important stakes for that age group. In 1917, Hourless won the Belmont Stakes and would be recognized as the U.S. Co-Champion Three-Year-Old Male Horse.

The 1917 edition of the Eastern Shore Handicap was won by Tippity Witchet, a gelding that would have a very successful career in racing which remarkably only ended twelve years later at age fourteen.

Future U.S. Racing Hall of Fame inductee Billy Kelly won the September 21, 1918 Eastern Shore Handicap for owner J. K. L. Ross who had purchased the horse on August 9 from trainer and co-owner William Perkins for $27,500.

Careful won the 1920 edition for owner Walter Salmon and would earn that year's American Co-Champion Two-Year-Old Filly honors. She came back to the Havre de Grace track the following year and defeated male competition again in winning the Chesapeake Stakes for three-year-olds. In 1922 Careful had another brilliant year that saw her named American Champion Older Female Horse.

Morvich kept his 1921 unbeaten streak going with his win in the Eastern Shore Handicap. He finished the year a perfect 11 for 11 and would go on to win the 1922 Kentucky Derby.

The 1930 running was won by Harry Whitney's Equipoise who would be chosen that year's U.S. Champion 2-Year-Old Colt. In a career hampered by serious health problems that limited his racing, Equipoise came back to be the dominant horse in racing during 1932 and 1933, earning American Horse of the Year honors. At stud Equipoise was the Leading sire in North America for 1942 and following its creation, induction into the U.S. Racing Hall of Fame in 1957.

In 1933 High Quest won the Eastern Shore in which he defeated two future Hall of Famers, Discovery and Cavalcade. As a three-year-old, High Quest would win the second leg of the U.S. Triple Crown series, the Preakness Stakes.

Rosemont won the 1934 race, easily defeating Nellie Flag and twelve other runners. Rosemont would race successfully through age five, most notably winning the 1937 Santa Anita Handicap in which he defeated the great Seabiscuit.

War Admiral won the 1936 Eastern Shore Handicap by five lengths in stakes record time. He returned to the Havre de Grace track on April 26, 1937, and won the Chesapeake Stakes, a final prep before winning the Kentucky Derby. War Admiral went on to become the fourth horse in history to capture the U.S. Triple Crown.

In 1941, Alsab and Cochis raced to a dead heat win. Colchis met with good success in racing, notably winning the 1942 Chesapeake Stakes by beating Alsab who had been voted the 1941 U.S. Champion Two-Year-Old Colt. In the ensuing Triple Crown races, Alsab ran second in the 1942 Kentucky Derby then won the Preakness before finishing second in the Belmont Stakes. His performances for the remainder of the year earned Alsab 1942 U.S. Champion Three-Year-Old Colt honors. He would be inducted into the U.S. Racing Hall of Fame in 1976.

World War II saw racing restricted in the United States and Havre de Grace Racetrack was forced to cancel all of its spring races in 1943. However, arrangements were made to run the Eastern Shore Handicap at Pimlico Race Course. Similarly, with wartime rationing still in place, for both 1944 and 1945 Laurel Park agreed to host the Eastern Shore Handicap.

Noble Impulse's winning time of 1:04 3/5 in the 1948 Eastern Shore broke the track record for 5 1/2 furlongs on dirt.

The final running of the Eastern Shore Stakes took place on May 4, 1949, and was won by Quiz Show owned by Frank Rosen's Palatine Stable.

Havre de Grace Racetrack was closed permanently at the end of the 1950 spring meeting.

== Records ==
Speed record:

- 1:11.00 @ 6 furlongs - War Admiral (1936)

Most wins by a jockey:

- 3 - Earl Sande (1918, 1919, 1926)
- 3 - John Gilbert (1934, 1943, 1949)

Most wins by a trainer:

- 3 - H. Guy Bedwell (1918, 1919, 1939)

Most wins by an owner:

- 2 - J. K. L. Ross (1918, 1919)
- 2 - J. Edwin Griffith (1924, 1925)
- 2 - Alfred G. Vanderbilt Jr. (1935, 1937)
- 2 - Bobanet Stable (R. Bruce Livie) (1944, 1945)

== Winners ==
Year	Winner	Age	Jockey	Trainer	Owner	Dist. (Miles)	Time	Win$
1949	Quiz Show	2	John Gilbert	Joseph H. Pierce Sr.	Palatine Stable (Frank Rosen)	4.5 F	0:52.40	$6,925
1948	Noble Impulse	2	Carson Kirk	John Porter Jones	Crispin Oglebay	5.5 F	1:04.60	
1947	Saggy	2	Albert Snider	Leonard E. Ogle	Helen L. Sagner	5 F	0:59.20	$6,025
1946	Raol	2	Albert Snider	Clay Sutphin	Sylvester W. Labrot Jr.	5 F	1:00.80	$4,550
1945	Marine Victory	2	Donnie Padgett	Albert Dunne	Bobanet Stable (R. Bruce Livie)	6 F	1:12.80	$7,725
1944	Bobanet	2	Shelby Clark	Albert Dunne	Bobanet Stable (R. Bruce Livie)	6 F	1:15.60	$8,200
1943	Royal Prince	2	John Gilbert	George Mohr	Mrs. H. J. Mohr	6 F	1:14.60	$10,850
1942	Blue Swords	2	Johnny Longden	Walter A. Kelley	Allen T. Simmons	6 F	1:12.00	$10,800
1941	Alsab (DH)	2	Robert Vedder	August Swenke	Mrs. Albert Sabath	6 F	1:12.60	$5,875
1941	Colchis (DH)	2	Maurice Peters	Vincent G. Mara	R. Sterling Clark	6 F	1:12.60	$5,875
1940	Little Beans	2	Eddie Smith	Rocco Palladino	Louise Palladino	6 F	1:11.40	$9,725
1939	Victory Morn	2	Alfred Shelhamer	H. Guy Bedwell	Ral Parr	6 F	1:12.40	
1938	Time Alone	2	Eddie Tucker	Carl A. Roles	Mrs. Frank A. Carreaud	6 F	1:12.80	$11,525
1937	Pit Bull	2	Sam Renick	Joseph H. Stotler	Alfred G. Vanderbilt Jr.	6 F	1:13.00	$12,075
1936	War Admiral	2	Charles Kurtsinger	George H. Conway	Glen Riddle Farm	6 F	1:11.00	$11,250
1935	Postage Due	2	Lee Fallon	Joseph H. Stotler	Alfred G. Vanderbilt Jr.	6 F	1:13.00	$10,725
1934	Rosemont	2	John Gilbert	Richard E. Handlen	Foxcatcher Farms	6 F	1:11.20	$11,225
1933	High Quest	2	Bobby Jones	Robert A. Smith	Brookmeade Stable	6 F	1:11.60	$12,125
1932	Caterwaul	2	Raymond Workman	William A. Crawford	Cornelius Vanderbilt Whitney	6 F	1:14.40	$30,000
1931	Burning Blaze	2	Willie Garner	John B. Partridge	Valley Lake Stable (Pat A. & Richard J. Nash)	6 F	1:12.80	$26,650
1930	Equipoise	2	Raymond Workman	Thomas J. Healey	Harry Payne Whitney	6 F	1:12.40	$26,900
1929	Dedicate	2	Edgar Barnes	John S. Ward	Everglade Stable (Frederick A. Burton)	6 F	1:13.00	$24,250
1928	Neddie	2	Eddie Ambrose	John F. Schorr	Edward B. McLean	6 F	1:13.00	$24,500
1927	Happy Time	2	Anthony Pascuma	William A. Crawford	Island Farm	6 F	1:12.40	$22,500
1926	Osmand	2	Earl Sande	Peter Coyne	Joseph E. Widener	6 F	1:15.80	$15,275
1925	Canter	2	Clarence Turner	Harry Rites	J. Edwin Griffith	6 F	1:12.80	$15,175
1924	Single Foot	2	Charles Fairbrother	Harry Rites	J. Edwin Griffith	6 F	1:13.00	$9,650
1923	Lord Baltimore	2	Chick Lang	William M. Garth	Joshua S. Cosden	6 F	1:13.20	
1922	Bluemont	2	Clyde Ponce	James E. Fitzsimmons	Quincy Stable	6 F	1:15.00	$7,900
1921	Morvich	2	Albert Johnson	Fred Burlew	Benjamin Block	6 F	1:13.40	$7,100
1920	Careful	2	Frank Keogh	Eugene Wayland	Walter J. Salmon Sr.	6 F	1:12.80	$7,000
1919	Constancy	2	Earl Sande	H. Guy Bedwell	J. K. L. Ross	6 F	1:12.40	$7,400
1918	Billy Kelly	2	Earl Sande	H. Guy Bedwell	J. K. L. Ross	6 F	1:15.60	$1,300
1917	Tippity Witchet	2	Morris Rowan	George M. Odom	Brighton Stable	5.5 F	1:06.40	$1,610
1916	Hourless	2	James Butwell	Samuel C. Hildreth	August Belmont Jr.	6 F	1:14.00	$4,050
1915	Slipshod	2	Tommy McTaggart	Albert Simons	Lewis S. Thompson	5.5 F	1:09.00	$1,395
1914	Gaelic	2	James Butwell	James E. Fitzsimmons	Arthur B. Hancock	5.5 F	1:09.60	$1,080
1913	Tranid	2	Kenneth Karrick	William H. Karrick	Schuyler L. Parsons	5.5 F	1:07.00	$1,280
