= 1951 Preakness Stakes =

76th running of the Preakness Stakes

76th Preakness Stakes
- The Preakness Stakes
- Location: Pimlico Race Course; Baltimore, Maryland, U.S.
- Date: May 19, 1951
- Distance: 1 3/16 mi (9.5 furlongs; 1,900 m)
- Winning horse: Bold
- Winning time: 1:56 2/5
- Final odds: 4.10-1
- Jockey: Eddie Arcaro (HoF)
- Trainer: Preston M. Burch (HoF)
- Owner: Brookmeade Stable
- Conditions: Fast
- Surface: Dirt
- Attendance: 24,863

The 1951 Preakness Stakes was the 76th running of the $110,245 Preakness Stakes horse race for three-year-old Thoroughbreds. The second leg of the U.S. Triple Crown series, the event took place on May 19, 1951. Owned by Isabel Dodge Sloane's Brookmeade Stable and ridden by future U.S. Racing Hall of Fame inductee, Eddie Arcaro, Bold easily won the race by seven lengths over runner-up Counterpoint. The race was run on a track rated fast in a final time of 1:56 2/5.

For jockey Arcaro, the win was a record fourth time he had won the race.

== Payout ==
The 75th Preakness Stakes Payout Schedule

Program Number	Horse Name	Win	Place	Show
**6**	**Bold**	$10.20	$6.40	$4.40
**7**	**Counterpoint**	-	$16.80	$7.60
**8**	Alerted			$4.20

== The full chart ==
Daily Racing Form Charts

Finish Position	Margin (lengths)	Post Position	Horse name	Jockey	Trainer	Owner	Post Time Odds	Earnings
1st	0	6	Bold	Eddie Arcaro	Preston M. Burch	Brookmeade Stable	4.10-1	$83,110
2nd	7	7	Counterpoint	Ray Adair	Sylvester E. Veitch	Cornelius Vanderbilt Whitney	25.80-1	$15,000
3rd	¾	8	Alerted	Sam Boulmetis Sr.	James Penrod	Hampton Stable	3.70-1	$7,500
4th	4	4	Timely Reward	James Stout	George M. Odom	Mrs. Wallace Gilroy	5.00-1	$3,750
5th	½	2	Hall of Fame †	Hedley Woodhouse	John M. Gaver Sr.	Greentree Stable	2.90-1	
6th	1½	3	Big Stretch †	Ted Atkinson	John M. Gaver Sr.	Greentree Stable	2.90-1	
7th	1	1	Knowitall	George Hettinger	Winbert F. Mulholland	Jessie Sloane Widener	17.70-1	
8th	6	5	Repetoire	Pete McLean	Albert Jensen	Mrs. Nora Mikell	4.00-1	

- Winning Breeder: **Brookmeade Stud; (VA)**
- Times: 1/4 mile – 0:23 0/0; 1/2 mile – 47 4/5; 3/4 mile – 1:11 2/5; mile – 1:37 2/5; 1 3/16 (final) – 1:56 2/5
- Track condition: fast
