= Spy Song =

American-bred Thoroughbred racehorse

- Sire: Balladier
- Grandsire: Black Toney
- Dam: Mata Hari
- Damsire: Peter Hastings
- Sex: Stallion
- Foaled: 1943
- Country: United States
- Color: Brown
- Breeder: Dixiana Farm
- Owner: Dixiana Farm
- Trainer: Jack C. Hodgins
- Record: 36: 15–9–4
- Earnings: $206,325

Major wins
- Arlington Futurity (1945); Hawthorne Sprint Handicap (1946); Chicago Handicap (1947); Myrtlewood Stakes (1947); Clang Handicap (1947); Hawthorne Speed Handicap (1947)
- Last updated on August 9, 2017

Spy Song (1943–1973) was an American Thoroughbred racehorse. He was sired by 1934 American Champion Two-Year-Old Colt Balladier and out of two-time Champion filly, Mata Hari. He was bred at owner Charles Fisher's Dixiana Farm and raced under the colors of his Dixiana Stable.

Among his wins, Spy Song won the 1945 Arlington Futurity and ran second to Assault in the 1946 Kentucky Derby. He retired having won fifteen of thirty-six starts with earnings of $206,325.

== Sire line tree ==
- Spy Song
  - Duc de Fer
    - Bon Nouvel
  - Royal Note
    - Little Tumbler
    - Forgotten Dreams
  - Crimson Satan
    - Oil Power
    - Whitesburg
    - Brilliant Sandy
    - Play the Red
