= Robert Jones (jockey) =

American jockey (1912–1938)

Bobby Jones
Personal information
- Born: October 28, 1912 California, United States
- Died: March 9, 1938 (aged 25) San Ysidro, California, United States
- Resting place: Calvary Cemetery (Los Angeles)
- Occupation: Jockey

Horse racing career
- Sport: Horse racing

Major racing wins
- Fairmount Derby (1929); Joliet Stakes (1931); Hopeful Stakes (1932); Arlington Futurity (1932, 1934); Arlington Classic (1933); Arlington Lassie (1933); Belmont Futurity Stakes (1933); Eastern Shore Handicap (1933); Fashion Stakes (1933); Sanford Stakes (1933); Travers Stakes (1933); Queens County Handicap (1934); Metropolitan Handicap (1934); Withers Stakes (1934); Santa Margarita Handicap (1936) American Triple Crown wins: Preakness Stakes (1934)

Racing awards
- United States Champion Jockey by wins (1926); Leading jockey at Arlington Park (1931); United States Champion Jockey by earnings (1933)

Significant horses
- High Quest, Inlander, Ladysman, Singing Wood

Robert "Bobby" Jones (October 28, 1912 – March 9, 1938) was an American two-time National Champion jockey in Thoroughbred horse racing.

From San Ysidro, California, Bobby Jones was the son of Alfred L. Jones, who was involved in horse racing and who raised Thoroughbreds.

Bobby Jones rode professionally at Agua Caliente Racetrack in Tijuana, Mexico but rose to prominence riding at racetracks in Chicago. In 1931 he was a contract jockey for the stable of Mrs. Emil Denemark, and others, and was the leading jockey at Arlington Park. The August 8, 1932, issue of the Chicago Daily Tribune wrote that Jones was considered "one of the greatest jockeys ever to come out of the west." The December 26, 1932, issue of the Tribune reported that he had signed a contract with racing stable owner Willis Sharpe Kilmer that could earn him $50,000 in 1933. While he met with little success riding for the Kilmer stable, Jones had also signed to ride for the Whitney family's famous Greentree Stable in 1933. That year, he led all jockeys in the United States in purse money won, finishing ahead of greats such as Silvio Coucci, Charlie Kurtsinger, Raymond Workman, Wayne Wright, and Mack Garner.

Bobby Jones made three straight appearances in the Kentucky Derby between 1933 and 1935 but finished off the board each time. In 1934 he rode for Isabel Dodge Sloane's Brookmeade Stable and for Liz Whitney. His 1934 successes included a win aboard High Quest in the Preakness Stakes, the second leg of the U.S. Triple Crown series.

Following the building of Santa Anita Racetrack in 1934, Bobby Jones returned to ride in California where he won the 1936 Santa Margarita Invitational Handicap. In 1937 he was competing at Tanforan Racetrack in San Bruno, California, when he was severely injured in a fall. Although he later returned to racing on a limited basis, Jones never fully recovered and in a weakened condition died of pneumonia on March 9, 1938, at his parents' home in San Ysidro.
