= Eliza (horse) =

American-bred Thoroughbred racehorse

- Sire: Mt. Livermore
- Grandsire: Blushing Groom
- Dam: Daring Bidder
- Damsire: Bold Bidder
- Sex: Filly
- Foaled: March 16, 1990; Kentucky
- Country: United States
- Colour: Bay
- Breeder: Allen E. Paulson
- Owner: Allen E. Paulson
- Trainer: Alex L. Hassinger, Jr.
- Record: 12: 5-2-2
- Earnings: US$1,095,316

Major wins
- Arlington-Washington Lassie Stakes (1992); Alcibiades Stakes (1992); Santa Anita Oaks (1993); Breeders' Cup wins: Breeders' Cup Juvenile Fillies (1992)

Awards
- American Champion Two-Year-Old Filly (1992)

Eliza (March 16, 1990 – c.2012) was an American Thoroughbred racehorse who won the 1992 Breeders' Cup Juvenile Fillies.

== Background ==
A descendant of the great Nearco through both her sire and her dam, Eliza was sired by multiple stakes winner, Mt. Livermore, a son of the outstanding sire, Blushing Groom. Her dam was owner Allen Paulson's Daring Bidder, a daughter of the 1966 American Co-Champion Older Male Horse, Bold Bidder.

In his 2003 book, Legacies of the Turf, noted race historian Edward L. Bowen wrote that according to Paulson family banter, Madeleine Paulson traded Cigar to husband Allen for Eliza.

== Racing career ==
Racing in Allen Paulson's name, Eliza was trained in 1992 by the then thirty-year-old Alex Hassinger Jr., who had just obtained his training license.

=== 1992 ===
At age two, the filly made five starts. She finished second in the Sorrento Stakes and won the Arlington-Washington Lassie and Alcibiades Stakes en route to the most important win of her career, the Breeders' Cup Juvenile Fillies. Raced that year at Florida's Gulfstream Park, Eliza set a new stakes record time. Her 1992 performances earned her American Champion Two-Year-Old Filly honors.

=== 1993 ===
At age three, Eliza made four starts. She won the Grade I Santa Anita Oaks, ran second to Dispute in the Grade I Kentucky Oaks, and was third against colts in the Grade I Santa Anita Derby.

=== 1994 ===
She made four more starts at age four in 1994, her best result a third in the June Darling Handicap at Del Mar Racetrack.

== Breeding record ==
Retired to broodmare duty, Eliza was bred to Allen Paulson's Theatrical plus important stallions such as Storm Bird, A.P. Indy and Fusaichi Pegasus. The most successful of her foals in racing was Mr. Kent who won four races in Japan and earned the equivalent of US$728,607.

Her last recorded foal, More Rock Less Net, was registered in 2012. She is believed to have died around that time.
