= Preston M. Burch =

Preston Burch
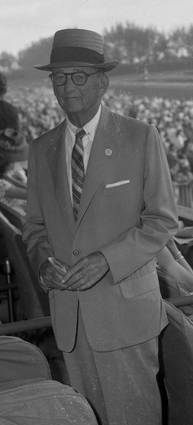
- Burch pictured at Hialeah, 1958

Personal information
- Born: August 25, 1884 Augusta, Georgia, U.S.
- Died: April 8, 1978 (aged 93)
- Resting place: Emmanuel Episcopal Church Cemetery, Middleburg, Virginia
- Occupation: Trainer

Horse racing career
- Sport: Horse racing
- Career wins: 1,236

Major racing wins
- Bowie Handicap (1918); Excelsior Handicap (1918); Yorktown Handicap (1918); Hamilton Derby (1924); King Edward Cup Handicap (1925); Victoria Stakes (1928); Chesapeake Stakes (1929, 1950); Potomac Handicap (1931); Suburban Handicap (1932, 1936); Withers Stakes (1932); Delaware Handicap (1933); Walden Stakes (1934); Lawrence Realization Stakes (1935); Jockey Club Gold Cup (1935, 1937); Huron Handicap (1936); Matron Stakes (1936); Alabama Stakes (1937); Schuylerville Stakes (1937, 1950); Coaching Club American Oaks (1938); Fashion Stakes (1943); National Stallion Stakes (1943); William Penn Stakes (1943); Fall Highweight Handicap (1945); Champagne stakes (1946); Tremont Stakes (1947); Flash Stakes (1949); Diana Handicap (1950); Empire City Gold Cup (1950); Louisiana Derby (1950); Matron Stakes (1950); Metropolitan Handicap (1950); Monmouth Handicap (1950); Spinaway Stakes (1950); Fleetwing Handicap (1951); Florida Derby (1952); Royal Palm Handicap (1952); Selima Stakes (1952); Bahamas Stakes (1953); Beldame Stakes (1953); Black Helen Handicap (1953); Pimlico Special (1955); Roamer Handicap (1955); Champlain Handicap (1956); Ladies Handicap (1956) American Classic Race wins: Preakness Stakes (1951)

Racing awards
- U.S. Champion Trainer by earnings (1950)

Honors
- United States' Racing Hall of Fame (1963); Preston M. Burch Handicap at Bowie Race Course

Significant horses
- George Smith, Bold, Atalanta, Sailor II; Flower Bowl, Firethorn, Greek Ship

Preston Morris Burch (August 25, 1884 – April 8, 1978) was an American Hall of Fame Thoroughbred racehorse trainer, breeder, and owner.

== Biography ==
=== Family background ===
Born in Augusta, Georgia, he was the son of Hall of Fame trainer, William P. Burch and Emily J. Cammer whose sister Leonora Cammer married another prominent horseman, Green B. Morris. Both Preston Burch and his brother Selby followed in their father's footsteps. He was greatly influenced by not only his father and uncle, but also by another Hall of Fame trainer, Sam Hildreth.

=== Early career ===
Preston Burch began his career in 1902 with the purchase of his first racehorse Stuyve, a bay gelding by Stuyvesant and out of Katie A. (by Hyder Ali). The gelding raced and won in Burch's colors: blue silks with orange cuffs and an orange cap.

Setting up his own public stable in Canada, Preston Burch trained horses for prominent American owners such as Francis R. Hitchcock and John E. Madden.

=== Move to Europe ===
When the New York State Legislature under Governor Charles Evans Hughes outlawed all racetrack betting it resulted in the closing of every horse racetrack in the state after the end of the 1910 season. Following the state ban, the suddenly out-of-work Burch moved to France where he was able to make a living training both steeplechase and flat racing Thoroughbreds for wealthy American owners Harry La Montagne, William Astor Chanler, George P. Eustis, and John Sanford. Competing at racetracks across Europe, among his successes was a win in the Grand Steeplechase International at Milan with Harry La Montagne's horse Sultan VII. His racing career was interrupted by the outbreak of World War I in which he served in France with the American Field Service as a volunteer ambulance driver.

=== Return to United States ===
At the end of the War, Burch returned to the United States where he continued to train horses for John Sanford as well as for George Wingfield's Nevada Stock Farm and later for Detroit auto body magnate, Charles T. Fisher. Burch eventually set up operations on the East coast with major clients such as Admiral Cary T. Grayson, Samuel Ross, Walter M. Jeffords, Sr., William duPont, Jr., Marion duPont Scott, Donald P. Ross and W. Deering Howe.

Burch bred a number of successful horses, the most famous of which was the U.S. Racing Hall of Fame filly Gallorette foaled in 1942. The following year he took over as head trainer for the highly successful Brookmeade Stable, owned by Isabel Dodge Sloane. Running Brookmeade Stable, in 1950 he was the United States' leading money winner. That year he trained the two-year-old colt, Bold, with whom he would win the 1951 Preakness Stakes.

In 1918, Burch saddled 1916 Kentucky Derby winner George Smith to victory in the Bowie Handicap at Pimlico Race Course by defeating two other Kentucky Derby winners. The 1917 winner, Omar Khayyam, finished second and 1918 winner, Exterminator, ran third. In addition, the 1918 Preakness Stakes winner War Cloud finished twelfth.

Known as someone who never allowed a horse to race unless it was in top condition, Burch was a founding member of the American Trainers Association. He was elected the Association's first president and served for seven years.

In 1953, Blood-Horse Publications published his book titled "Training Thoroughbred Horses" (ASIN: B000O6YU38). The widely read book was reprinted in 1973, 1976, and again in 1992.

=== Retirement ===
In 1957, Burch retired after a career that spanned fifty-six years. Under his tutelage, assistant trainers such as Richard E. Handlen, Burley Parke, and Oscar White learned the art of conditioning Thoroughbreds and went on to very successful training careers of their own.

Preston Burch was inducted into the National Museum of Racing and Hall of Fame in 1963. In 1973, he was the honored guest at the annual Testimonial Dinner given by the Thoroughbred Club of America. He was one of the trainers feature in the 2007 book Masters of the Turf: Ten Trainers Who Dominated Horse Racing's Golden Age by author Edward L. Bowen.

== Family ==
Burch's son Elliott also became a racehorse trainer. Like his father and grandfather, Elliott Burch had an outstanding career that resulted in his induction in the National Museum of Racing and Hall of Fame in 1980. Another son of Preston Burch, William Preston Burch (1919–1998), was a Longtime executive with Gulfstream Aerospace whose son Preston M. Burch II is a 1966 graduate of Adelphi University with a degree in physics and is the manager of the Hubble Space Telescope Program and Deputy Associate Director for Astrophysics, NASA Goddard Space Flight Center.

Burch lived in Dunn Loring, Virginia at the time of his death in 1978.
