= Bold (horse) =

American Thoroughbred racehorse

- Sire: By Jimminy
- Grandsire: Pharamond II
- Dam: Little Rebel
- Damsire: John P. Grier
- Sex: Stallion
- Foaled: 1948
- Country: United States
- Colour: Brown
- Breeder: Brookmeade Stable
- Owner: Brookmeade Stable
- Trainer: Preston M. Burch
- Record: 12: 4–3–1
- Earnings: $107,460

Major wins
- Saranac Handicap (1951) Triple Crown wins: Preakness Stakes (1951)

Bold (1948–1952) was an American Thoroughbred racehorse that is best remembered for winning the 1951 Preakness Stakes and for being killed when struck by lightning at the age of four while pastured at his Upperville, Virginia farm.

== Background ==
Bold was a dark bay horse bred by his owners, the Virginia-based Brookmeade Stable. He was sired by the 1944 American Champion Three-Year-Old Colt By Jimminy out of the mare Little Rebel. Little Rebel was a daughter of the broodmare Warrior Lass, whose other descendants include the Kentucky Derby winner Riva Ridge and the Belmont Stakes winner Bounding Home.

== Racing career ==
Bold did not run in the Kentucky Derby and did not appear as a three-year-old until ten days before the Preakness Stakes. He ran twice at Pimlico Race Course winning once and then finishing second by a neck to Alerted in the Preakness Prep over 8 1/2 furlongs The Kentucky Derby winner Count Turf had not been entered in the Preakness and Bold, ridden for the first time by Eddie Arcaro, started second favourite at 4.1 : 1 behind the Greentree Stable entry which comprised Big Stretch and Hall of Fame. The colt was equipped with a set of asymmetrical blinkers which blocked the vision in his right eye to prevent him drifting away from the rail. Arcaro sent Bold into the lead shortly after the start and after being briefly headed by Counterpoint he opened up a clear lead. Bold turned into the stretch three lengths clear of his rivals and steadily increased his advantage to win by seven lengths from Counterpoint, with Alerted third. The win, which gave Arcaro a record fourth win in the race, reportedly attracted the biggest ever television audience for a horse race up to that time.

Bold suffered from bucked shins after the Preakness, and after finishing a well-beaten third to Count Turf in the Polynesian Purse at Belmont Park he was withdrawn from the Belmont Stakes. Bold returned to the racecourse in July to win the Saranac Handicap at Jamaica Race Course, leading all the way on a muddy to track to win by a length from Loridale.

== Death ==
Bold's problems with bucked shins recurred during the early part of 1952. He was rested in Virginia before resuming his 4-year-old campaign in Saratoga where he ran twice without success. He was struck by lightning and killed on the evening of July 9–10, 1952 while in an outdoor training paddock.

== Pedigree ==
Pedigree of Bold (USA), brown colt 1948
Sire By Jimminy (USA) 1941	Pharamond II (GB); 1925	Phalaris	Polymelus
Sire By Jimminy (USA) 1941	Pharamond II (GB); 1925	Phalaris	Bromus
Sire By Jimminy (USA) 1941	Pharamond II (GB); 1925	Selene	Chaucer
Sire By Jimminy (USA) 1941	Pharamond II (GB); 1925	Selene	Serenissima
Sire By Jimminy (USA) 1941	Buginarug; 1934	Blue Larkspur	Black Servant
Sire By Jimminy (USA) 1941	Buginarug; 1934	Blue Larkspur	Blossom Time
Sire By Jimminy (USA) 1941	Buginarug; 1934	Breakfast Bell	Black Toney
Sire By Jimminy (USA) 1941	Buginarug; 1934	Breakfast Bell	Batter Cake
Dam Little Rebel (USA) 1939	John P. Grier; 1917	Whisk Broom II	Broomstick
Dam Little Rebel (USA) 1939	John P. Grier; 1917	Whisk Broom II	Audience
Dam Little Rebel (USA) 1939	John P. Grier; 1917	Wonder	Disguise
Dam Little Rebel (USA) 1939	John P. Grier; 1917	Wonder	Curiosity
Dam Little Rebel (USA) 1939	Warrior Lass; 1926	Man o' War	Fair Play
Dam Little Rebel (USA) 1939	Warrior Lass; 1926	Man o' War	Mahubah
Dam Little Rebel (USA) 1939	Warrior Lass; 1926	Sweetheart	Ultimus
Dam Little Rebel (USA) 1939	Warrior Lass; 1926	Sweetheart	Humanity (Family: 1-k)
