= Clyde Van Dusen =

American jockey and racehorse trainer

Personal information
- Born: 1886 United States
- Died: January 8, 1951 (aged 64–65)
- Occupation: Trainer

Horse racing career
- Sport: Horse racing
- Career wins: Not found

Major racing wins
- Bashford Manor Stakes (1932); Arlington-Washington Lassie Stakes (1933); Arlington-Washington Futurity Stakes (1933); Clark Handicap (1934); Phoenix Stakes (1939) American Classic Race wins: Kentucky Derby (1929)

Racing awards
- Leading trainer at Santa Anita Park (1941, winter)

Significant horses
- Clyde Van Dusen, Mata Hari

Clyde Van Dusen (1886 – January 8, 1951) was an American jockey and trainer of Thoroughbred racehorses best known for winning the 1929 Kentucky Derby.

== Biography ==
Following a career as a jockey, Van Dusen turned to training. Handling the racing stable of Amsterdam, New York businessman, Herbert P. Gardner, in 1929 Clyde Van Dusen became the only trainer to ever win the Kentucky Derby with a horse named in their honor. The gelding, Clyde Van Dusen, was the first son of Man o' War to win the Kentucky Derby. Shortly after winning the Derby, Van Dusen went to work for Detroit auto body manufacturer, Charles T. Fisher, owner of Dixiana Farm. Van Dusen trained Fisher's colt Sweep All who ran second to Horse of the Year and future Hall of Fame inductee Twenty Grand in the 1931 Kentucky Derby. In 1933 and 1934 he trained Fisher's Mata Hari to American Champion Two-Year-Old Filly and Three-Year-Old Filly honors. In December 1938, after nine years working for Charles Fisher, Van Dusen gave notice that he would be leaving. In 1939, he accepted the job of trainer for the California stable of movie studio boss, Louis B. Mayer.

The leading trainer at the 1941 Santa Anita Park winter meeting, on February 6 he became the first trainer to saddle four winners on a single racecard at Santa Anita, a record that as of 2009 has been tied but never broken. Van Dusen retired at the beginning of March that year but remained active in racing with a small string of his own horses. During 1941, he and the horse Clyde Van Dusen were reunited when the retired gelding was sent to Hollywood Park Racetrack to serve as a lead pony.

Clyde Van Dusen died in Beverly Hills, California of a heart attack at age sixty-five.
