= Private Vow =

American-bred Thoroughbred racehorse

- Sire: Broken Vow
- Grandsire: Unbridled
- Dam: Smooth as Silk
- Damsire: Deputy Minister
- Sex: Stallion
- Foaled: April 19, 2003
- Died: July 22, 2020
- Country: United States
- Colour: Dark Bay
- Breeder: Mr. & Mrs. R. Witt & Mr. & Mrs. L. Scattaglia (KY)
- Owner: Mike McCarty
- Trainer: Steve Asmussen
- Record: 12: 4-1-2
- Earnings: US$491,312

Major wins
- Futurity Stakes (2005); Kentucky Jockey Club Stakes (2005)
- Last updated on 17 December 2020

Private Vow (April 19, 2003 – July 22, 2020) was a thoroughbred race horse. As a foal of 2003, he was a possible contender for the Triple Crown in 2006.

== Background ==
Private Vow's sire is Broken Vow, who in 2001 won four stakes races (including graded wins at Keeneland and Monmouth Park) and finished either second or third in four other stakes. His dam, Smooth as Silk, had two wins from eight starts for trainer Bobby Frankel.

Private Vow's damsire was the Canadian-bred champion Deputy Minister.

== Racing career ==
Owned by Mike McCarty and primarily trained by Steve Asmussen, Private Vow won two Grade 2 stakes races as a two-year-old in 2005, but fared poorly in the Breeders' Cup Juvenile that year. He placed 15th in the 2006 Kentucky Derby and was retired after a 7th-place finish in a listed stakes race at the Fair Grounds in 2007.

== Breeding ==
Following his retirement, Private Vow stood as a stallion at Red River Farms in Louisiana. He was then sold to a farm in South Korea to stand starting with the 2015 breeding season.

== Death ==
In December 2020 it was learned through public record searches that Private Vow was killed at a slaughterhouse in South Korea on July 22, 2020. The animal rights organization PETA, citing multiple Korean databases, claimed that four of Private Vow's offspring - two fillies and two colts - were killed similarly in 2019 and 2020, respectively.

In response to PETA's announcement, major US racetrack operator Stronach Group has called on banning the sale of North American thoroughbreds to South Korean interests. Both PETA and Stronach have requested that the Korean Racing Authority (KRA) provide better safeguards for retired racehorses. The KRA later released a statement saying that they have established guidelines for retired racehorses that are communicated on a regular basis, including the operation of a retirement program and an equine welfare committee. They emphasized that no horse is imported to Korea for slaughter purposes, adding that "...the right to dispose (of horses) belong to owners and are not subject to external intervention."

According to The Blood-Horse, the KRA lists Private Vow's date of death as September 22, 2020.
