= Axton-Fisher Tobacco Company =

Former Kentucky-based manufacturer of cigarettes

Axton-Fisher Tobacco Company, founded in 1903, was a Louisville, Kentucky-based manufacturer of cigarettes that played a key role in popularizing menthol cigarettes, with its Spud brand. It was acquired by Philip Morris Companies Inc. in 1944.

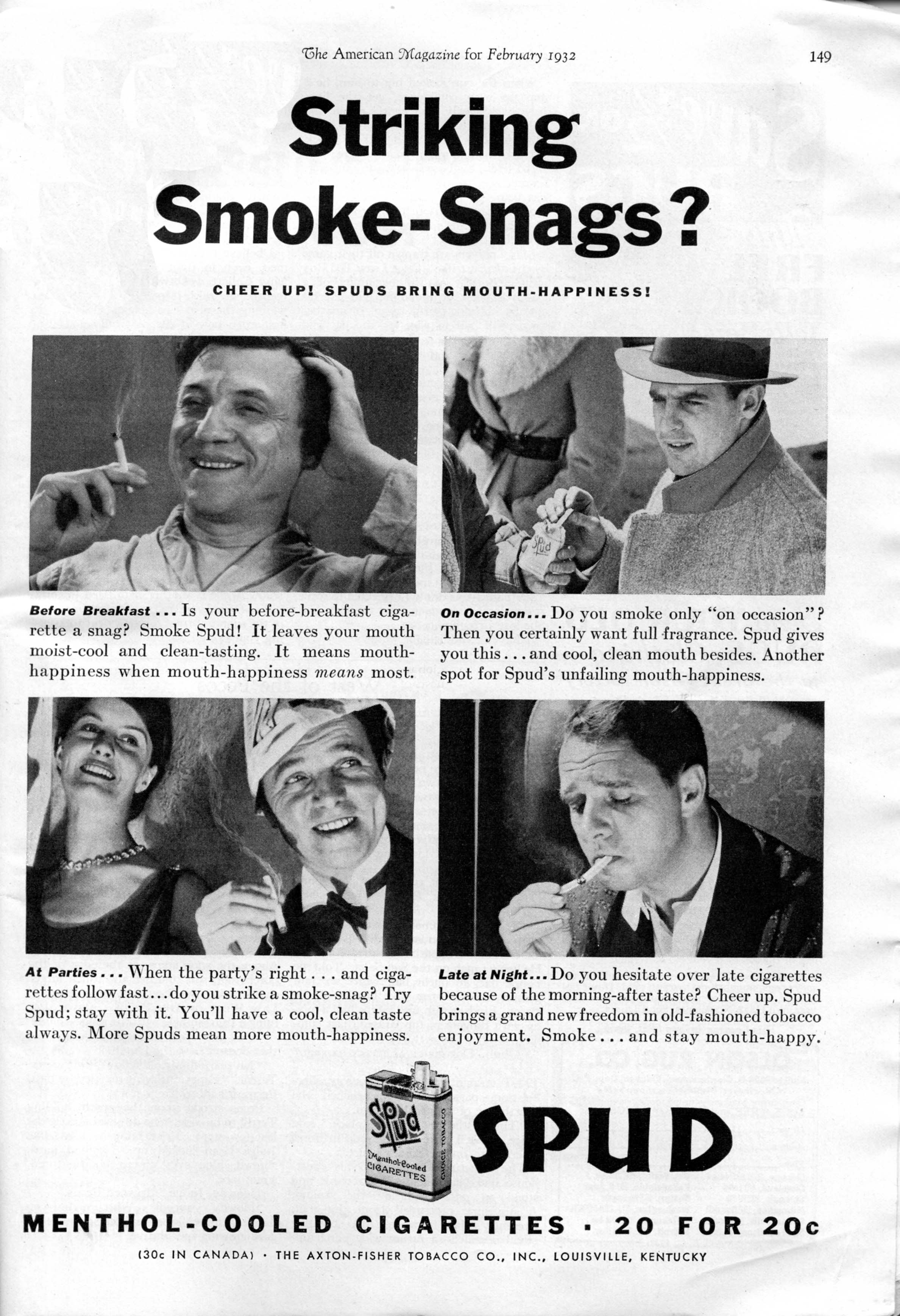
Spud cigarettes advertisement in The American Magazine (February, 1932)

Menthol cigarettes were first developed by Lloyd "Spud" Hughes of Mingo Junction, Ohio, in 1924, though the idea did not become popular until the Axton-Fisher Tobacco Co. acquired the patent in 1927, marketing them nationwide as "Spud Menthol Cooled Cigarettes". Spud brand menthol cigarettes went on to become the fifth most popular brand in the US by 1932, and it remained the only menthol cigarette on the market until the Brown & Williamson Tobacco Company created the Kool brand in 1933.

== Twenty Grand cigarette brand ==
The popularity of the famous racehorse Twenty Grand was exploited by Axton-Fisher, his name and image being used for a brand of cigarettes that was marketed starting in 1932. In 1936, Axton-Fisher's right to the Twenty Grand trademark was upheld after it was sued for trademark infringement.
