= Dixiana Farm =

American horse breeding farm

Coordinates: 38.127501°N 84.428387°W

- Type: Horse breeding Farm
- Industry: Thoroughbred horse racing
- Predecessor: Hamilton Stud
- Founded: 1877
- Headquarters: Lexington, Kentucky
- Key people: William Shively (owner); Terry Arnold (farm manager)
- Website: dixianadomino.com

Dixiana Farm, founded in 1877, is an American Thoroughbred horse breeding farm in Lexington, Kentucky. It is the birthplace of Hall of Fame inductee Domino.

In 1971 the Keeneland Association honored Dixiana Farm with its Keeneland Mark of Distinction for their contribution to Keeneland and the Thoroughbred industry.

== Barak G. Thomas ==
Major Barak G. Thomas, a Confederate soldier in the Civil War and later Sheriff of Fayette County, Kentucky, purchased Hamilton Stud in 1877 and renamed it Dixiana after his broodmare Dixie. He subsequently bred Himyar, who in turn sired Domino. Thomas named Hira Villa Farm (now part of Mt. Brilliant) after the dam of Himyar. Thomas is thought to be one of the first men to make his sole living by breeding and selling stock.

Himyar was famous with a racing career that spanned four years. He had a second-place finish in the 1878 Kentucky Derby and won the Day Star that same year. All the while, he was notably still claiming multiple stakes wins at ages 4 and 5. Himyar's also well-noted for his progeny, Domino, who had been crowned in multiple competitions.

Purchased for $3,000 by James R. Keene, Domino, the colt known as the "brown phenomenon" and "black whirlwind" (in reference to the peculiar color of his coat on any given day) was a horse of extreme speed at short distances. He was undefeated at age 2 and went on to be named Champion Two Year Old and 1893 American Horse of the Year. Although Domino only lived to the age of 6, his achievements at stud were extensive. Domino sired only 19 named foals, but 8 of them went on to become stakes race winners. His influence is still felt in modern pedigrees. Domino was returned to Thomas upon his death and laid to rest at Hira Villa. His headstone reads, "Here lies the fleetest of runners the American Turf has ever known, and one of the gamest and most generous of horses."

In 1890 Major Thomas fell on hard times. Due to disappointing sale prices and unsettled debts, Thomas found himself forced to sell the farm named for his beloved mare. Dixiana was sold to Jacob S. Coxey on November 23, 1897. The majority of Major Thomas's Dixiana stock, including Himyar for a meager $2,500, was dispersed in Lexington by New York auctioneer William Easton.

== Jacob S. Coxey ==
Jacob Sechler Coxey, better known as "General Coxey," was an ambitious businessman and labor leader. He was famous for his "Industrial Army" of unemployed workers, famously regarded as "Coxey's Army", who marched on Washington D.C. during the Economic Depression of the 1890s. General Coxey established the Coxey Silica Sand Company that operated as a sand quarry. When his business, among others, began to falter under depressing economic conditions, he went to work on behalf of the ordinary labor worker who Coxey felt needed representation in Washington. Although his many attempts to achieve public office fell short, including a run for the presidency of the United States in 1932, on behalf of the United States Farmer Labor Party, Coxey continued his crusade on behalf of the working class. Along with his passion for politics, Coxey was also well regarded for being a prosperous horse breeder. It is not certain the exact dates Coxey owned Dixiana; however, it is known to have been a period of less than two years.

== Thomas J. Carson ==
Sometime between 1889 and 1890, Dixiana passed from the hands of Coxey to Major Thomas J. Carson. Carson, also a respected thoroughbred breeder, produced such champions as the great sprinters Roseben and Highball. Roseben, bred at Dixiana and affectionately known as "The Big Train," stood nearly 18 hands tall. Although not able to capture a win until his three-year-old season, he soon went on to become a sprinting sensation capturing wins under such enormous weights as 147 lb (67 kg). Making 111 lifetime starts, Roseben crossed the wire first in nearly half of those starts making his most notable wins in the Toboggan, Fall and Carter Handicaps.

== James Ben Ali Haggin ==
In 1909 Dixiana Farm was once again under new ownership, acquired by Kentucky-born entrepreneur James Ben Ali Haggin. It is recorded that Carson traded Dixiana to Ben Ali Haggin for a tract of farm land. At this time in history, Dixiana was to become part of Haggin's prestigious Elmendorf Farm and for the next seventeen years was used primarily for crops and tobacco. The story of Ben Ali Haggin is one of a frontiersman who began his career as a lawyer after graduating from Centre College in Danville, KY, then setting his sights on the West and eventually practicing law in San Francisco during the Gold Rush. After acquiring Rancho Del Paso outside of Sacramento, Haggin ventured into the mining business with sweeping success. In 1880, he established his intentions as a serious horseman by opening a breeding operation at his Rancho Del Paso farm. Soon thereafter, he returned to his native state and purchased Elmendorf in 1897. His imprint on racing and breeding are still felt today through the descendants of his breeding and racing operation.

== James Cox Brady ==
James Cox Brady Sr., a famous traction magnate from New York was next in line to take over the ownership of Dixiana and restore it back to its famous thoroughbred nursery status. James Brady was the son of millionaire Anthony N. Brady who in 1900 was the largest shareholder of the American Tobacco Company. His fortune was passed down to his son and in 1918, James Cox Brady was considered to be one of the thirty richest Americans. He purchased Dixiana from Ben Ali Haggin in 1925 and spent a substantial amount of money to renovate the farm. Brady only held onto the farm for three years before dying. However, during his time at Dixiana he possessed a successful racing operation.

== Charles T. Fisher ==
After the death of James C. Brady, Dixiana was soon to become one of the foremost racing, breeding and show horse operations in history. The success the farm once enjoyed under its founder Major Barak G. Thomas was soon to replicate itself, only on a much larger scale. In 1928, Charles T. Fisher of Detroit and his wife Sarah, purchased Dixiana, (which at the time was approximately 900 acres) for $240,000. Dixiana remained intact until 1947, when Fisher sold about half of the acreage to Royce G. Martin, who then launched Woodvale Stud. That property was resold several times and later became Domino Stud. Fisher, along with his brother Fred and Uncle Albert, founded the Fisher Body Company which produced auto bodies for companies such as Cadillac and Ford. In 1919, General Motors purchased Fisher Body Company for a reported 27 million dollars.

The accomplishments of Charles Fisher in the auto industry spilled over into his Thoroughbred and Saddlebred pursuits. The list of runners produced during the Fisher era is long and distinguished, including the great Mata Hari, winner of the Arlington Lassie Stakes, the Kentucky Jockey Club Stakes, the Illinois Derby and Illinois Oaks. In addition, she was named both American Champion Two-Year-Old Filly of 1933 and American Champion Three-Year-Old Filly of 1934. Other stakes winners included: Sweep All, Cee Tee, Sirocco, Amber Light (1943 Louisiana Derby), Spy Song (Arlington Futurity, Vosburgh Handicap), Star Reward and Sub Fleet (2nd in 1952 Ky Derby). Spy Song, a son of Mata Hari, was brilliant at sprinting distances, breaking his maiden at 4 ½ furlongs by 12 lengths and setting a new track record in the process. It comes as no surprise as Balladier, sire of Spy Song, was a Domino-line standard bearer. Though finishing second in the Kentucky Derby to Assault, he was most efficient at shorter distances. In total, Spy Song won 15 of 36 starts, consistent and fast.

== Mary V. Fisher ==
During the 1930s, Dixiana, also enjoyed prosperity and notoriety as a saddle horse farm. Charles and Sarah's daughter Mary V. Fisher was an accomplished gated horse show woman. In 1986 she was awarded the honors of being the first saddle horse rider inducted into the National Horse Show Hall of Fame and in 1998 was also inducted into the Kentucky Hall of Fame. During this time, Dixiana Farm was home to five gaited champion Beau Woolf. Towards the end of her father's life, Mary Fisher took over the management of Dixiana. The farm continued to prosper and continued to produce great runners such as Red Cross, Fulvous and Fulcrum (Breeders' Futurity Stakes 1957). In 1986 Dixiana was once again sold after a legacy of 58 years within the Fisher family.

== Mary Lou Wibel ==
Mary Lou Wibel, a business woman from Tennessee, purchased Dixiana for $5,953,400 and with partner Bruce Kline, also farm manager, soon turned the farm into a successful commercial breeding and boarding operation. During the late 1980s and 90s, Dixiana was 300 acres (1.2 km^{2}) with another 265 acres (1.07 km^{2}) on lease. It was home to legendary stallions such as Mr. Greeley and Fly Till Dawn. In 1999 the farm made its mark in the sales ring by selling a record priced $3.9 million colt by Kris S. at that year's Keeneland September Yearling Sale. Dixiana was also home to other champions such as Fly So Free, Champion 2-year-old male of 1990, who was broken and prepped there as well as 1997 Epsom Derby winner Benny the Dip.

== William J. Shively ==
In 2002 Mary Wibel put Dixiana Farm on the market to be passed on once again. After her ownership of nearly 20 years the farm was purchased in 2004 by Gainesville, Florida businessman and current owner William J. Shively. He is a member of the Board of Trustees of the Thoroughbred Owners and Breeders Association (TOBA), based in Lexington, Kentucky. At the time he purchased Dixiana, Mr. Shively was the owner of Tomoka Hills Farm in Florida which produced Florida Older Horse of the Year and Sprint Champion Benny the Bull and also Elk Hill Farm which is adjacent to Dixiana. William Shively in partnership with Diane Waldron and Leah Killingsworth purchased and campaigned sprinter Personal First, a son of the later Personal Hope whose most noted win came in the Gr. 3 Amsterdam at Saratoga in 2000. In 2006 Mr. Shively purchased Woodlynn farm (later renamed to Woodland farm) in Lexington; the farm produced G1 winner and sire More Than Ready. Woodlynn is currently the primary location of the farms yearlings while Dixiana is home to the farms broodmare band.

In May 2009, Mr. Shively purchased Domino Stud, the half of the original Dixiana Farm that was sold off in 1947, from the widow of owner Kenneth Jones who died at the age of 90 in October 2008. For the first time in more than 60 years, the historic Dixiana Farm is now restored to its original acreage under one owner.
