= Albert Fisher (Detroit) =

American automotive pioneer in Detroit, Michigan (1864–1942)

- Born: January 2, 1864; Peru, Ohio, U.S.
- Died: March 15, 1942 (aged 78); Detroit, Michigan, U.S.
- Resting place: Mount Olivet Cemetery; Detroit, Michigan, U.S.
- Occupations: businessman; automotive pioneer

Albert Fisher (January 2, 1864 – March 15, 1942) was a pioneer in the burgeoning auto industry in Detroit. He was the uncle of the seven Fisher brothers, founders of Fisher Body. Albert Fisher built some of the first bodies for many automobiles and trucks. He built the first touring car body for Henry Ford. He was one of those whose efforts started the industry that transformed Detroit into one of the great metropolitan centers of the nation.

== Early life ==
Fisher's parents, Andrew and Stephinia Fisher, arrived in the United States from Baden, Germany around 1835 and settled in Peru, Ohio, where Andrew set up a blacksmith shop. They raised eight children, including Albert who was born in 1864. In his younger years, Fisher worked at his father's blacksmith shop after school.

== Career ==
At the age of 16, Fisher took a job as a hotel clerk in Norwalk, Ohio. After a year, he served an apprenticeship for four years in carriage building. In 1885, Fisher came to Detroit, Michigan to work for the C.R. & J.C. Wilson Carriage Co. Fisher moved on to study in Chicago and Boston. He returned to Detroit in 1888 and rejoined the Wilson company as superintendent.

=== Standard Wagon Works ===
In 1891, Fisher bought a partnership in Standard Wagon Works, a carriage factory. He eventually bought out his partner and continued the business alone. The company was notable for building the first fleet of wagons for the Detroit News in 1894. Henry Ford was a customer of Standard Wagon Works and had commissioned Fisher to build the body for "Ford's Contraption". Ford asked Fisher to build 50 bodies, offering payment in the form of stock in his company, the same payment he was offering the Dodge Brothers to build motors. The conservative Fisher considered the offer too speculative and insisted on cash. Fisher's business continued to grow as he built bodies for Oldsmobile and other new automobile manufacturers.

In 1902, at Albert's suggestion, Albert's nephew Fred Fisher, son of Lawrence Fisher, came to Detroit seeking employment. Fred found work as a draftsman at C. R. Wilson Company, joined by his brother Charles Fisher in 1904. The brothers worked there until 1908, when they quit over a salary dispute. Albert offered Fred and Charles jobs in his carriage shop and the brothers gratefully accepted.

=== Fisher Body Co ===
On July 22, 1908, Albert, Fred and Charles Fisher formed the Fisher Body Co., capitalized at $50,000, with $30,000 cash paid in by Albert. Walter Flanders, a partner in E-M-F Company, suggested that the new company build an inexpensive closed car body. Closed cars at that time were not only expensive but were considered undesirable by Ford. As Fred and Charles began to experiment with closed sedan bodies, Albert not only protested but soon wanted out of the new venture altogether. Albert's share of the company was bought out by Louis Mendelssohn in 1909.

=== Standard Motor Truck Co ===
In 1910, Fisher incorporated the Standard Motor Truck Co. He became the sole owner of the company in 1915. He continued to manufacture trucks at the factory at 1111 Bellevue Street in Detroit until a few years before his death.

== Later Years and Death ==
Albert Fisher was married in 1889 to Mary Gangwish, of Norwalk, Ohio. They had nine children. Mary died March 22, 1923. In 1928 Fisher married Christine A. Bauer Chester, a Detroit business woman. Albert Fisher died March 15, 1942. He is buried in Mount Olivet Cemetery in Detroit.
