= Twenty Grand =

American-bred Thoroughbred racehorse

- Twenty Grand in 1931
- Sire: St. Germans
- Grandsire: Swynford
- Dam: Bonus
- Damsire: All Gold
- Sex: Stallion
- Foaled: 1928
- Country: United States
- Colour: Bay
- Breeder: Greentree Stable
- Owner: Greentree Stable (Silks: Pink, Black Stripes on Sleeves, Black Cap)
- Trainer: Thomas W. Murphy (1930); James G. Rowe Jr.
- Record: 23: 14-4-3
- Earnings: $261,790

Major wins
- Kentucky Jockey Club Stakes (1930); Junior Champion Stakes (1930); Wood Memorial Stakes (1931); Dwyer Stakes (1931); Lawrence Realization Stakes (1931); Travers Stakes (1931); Saratoga Cup (1931); Jockey Club Gold Cup (1931) American Classic Race wins: Kentucky Derby (1931); Belmont Stakes (1931)

Awards
- American Champion 3-Yr-Old Colt (1931); American Horse of the Year (1931)

Honors
- United States Racing Hall of Fame (1957) #52 - Top 100 U.S. Racehorses of the 20th Century
- Last updated on January 22, 2010

Twenty Grand (1928–1948) was an American thoroughbred race horse. Owned and bred by Helen Hay Whitney's Greentree Stable, Twenty Grand was a bay colt by St. Germans out of Bonus.

== Racing career ==
Trained at age three by James G. Rowe, Jr. and ridden by jockey Charley Kurtsinger, Twenty Grand raced against very strong opponents in 1930 and 1931 when he was part of what the Chicago Tribune newspaper called the "big four" in racing, which included Jamestown, Mate, and Equipoise. Twenty Grand won the Wood Memorial Stakes, Kentucky Derby, Belmont Stakes, Dwyer Stakes, Travers Stakes, Saratoga Cup, and the Jockey Club Gold Cup. In his only blemish of the year, Twenty Grand just missed the Triple Crown, finishing second to Mate in the Preakness. He went off as the post time favorite at 3:2. Mate, his stablemate, was sent to the front early, followed by Clock Tower. As Twenty Grand tried to pass the leaders on the clubhouse turn, he was bumped badly by Clock Tower. Twenty Grand was knocked off his stride but recovered. Down the back stretch and around the final turn, he made up ground on Ladder and Mate. His jockey, Charlie Kurtsinger, chose the rail and went inside, but the tiring Mate blocked Twenty Grand and held on to win by a half length. Twenty Grand's performances in 1931 earned him retrospective American Horse of the Year honors.

After twenty five races, of which he won fourteen, finished second four times and third three times, Twenty Grand was retired to stud but proved to be sterile.

In 1957, he was elected to the National Museum of Racing and Hall of Fame. In the Blood-Horse ranking of the top 100 U.S. thoroughbred champions of the 20th Century, Twenty Grand ranked number 52.

== Twenty Grand Cigarette Brand ==
Twenty Grand's fame was reflected in his name and image being used for a brand of cigarettes put out by Axton-Fisher Tobacco Co. In 1936, Axton-Fisher's right to the Twenty Grand trademark was upheld after it was sued for trademark infringement.

=== Cigarette Camp ===
Camp Twenty Grand was an American Army "cigarette camp", located near Le Havre, France, during World War II and named after the once-popular American cigarette brand (Twenty Grand cigarettes).

== See also ==
- List of racehorses
