= Mata Hari (horse) =

American-bred Thoroughbred racehorse

- Sire: Peter Hastings
- Grandsire: Peter Pan
- Dam: War Woman
- Damsire: Man o' War
- Sex: Mare
- Foaled: 1931
- Country: United States
- Colour: Brown
- Breeder: Charles T. Fisher
- Owner: Dixiana Stable
- Trainer: Clyde Van Dusen
- Record: 16: 7-0-2
- Earnings: US$66,699

Major wins
- Arlington Lassie Stakes (1933); Breeders' Futurity Stakes (1933); Kentucky Jockey Club Stakes (1933); Illinois Derby (1934); Illinois Oaks (1934)

Awards
- American Champion Two-Year-Old Filly (1933); American Champion Three-Year-Old Filly (1934)

Honours
- Mata Hari Stakes at Thistledown Racecourse; Mata Hari Handicap at Sportsman's Park

Mata Hari (foaled in 1931 in Kentucky) was an American Champion Thoroughbred racehorse bred and owned by Charles T. Fisher, a Detroit automobile body manufacturer who raced under the Dixiana Stable banner named for his Dixiana Farm in Lexington, Kentucky.

== Racing career ==
=== 1933: two-year-old season ===
Trained by Clyde Van Dusen, as a two-year-old in 1933, Mata Hari won five of her eight starts. On July 8, 1933, she earned her third win in three starts by taking the important Arlington Lassie Stakes at Arlington Park. In winning the October 21, 1933 Breeders' Futurity Stakes, Mata Hari defeated colts, including future Hall of Fame inductee Discovery, and set a Latonia track record of 1:09 3/5 for six furlongs on dirt. One week later at Latonia, she became the second filly in its fourteen-year history to win the Kentucky Jockey Club Stakes in which she again defeated males.

Mata Hari's performances in 1933 saw her retrospectively named American Champion Two-Year-Old Filly along with Edward R. Bradley's Bazaar.

=== 1934: three-year-old season ===
In 1934, Mata Hari continued racing against her male counterparts. John Gilbert rode her to a fourth-place finish in the 1934 Kentucky Derby won by Cavalcade. She went on to win the May 23 Illinois Derby against males at Aurora Downs, breaking the track record by more than three seconds with a time of 1:49 3/5 for a mile and an eighth on dirt. On June 23, Mata Hari won the Illinois Oaks for fillies at Washington Park Race Track.

For the second year in a row, Mata Hari was retrospectively named the American Champion Filly of her age group.

== Broodmare ==
Mata Hari was bred to sires such as Bull Lea, Ksar, and Eight Thirty. Her best runner was Charles Fisher's homebred colt Spy Song (b. 1943). Sired by 1934 American Champion Two-Year-Old Colt Balladier, Spy Song won the 1945 Arlington Futurity and ran second in the 1946 Kentucky Derby.
