= Clyde Van Dusen (horse) =

American-bred Thoroughbred racehorse

- Sire: Man o' War
- Grandsire: Fair Play
- Dam: Uncle's Lassie
- Damsire: Uncle
- Sex: Gelding
- Foaled: 1926
- Country: United States
- Colour: Chestnut
- Breeder: Herbert P. Gardner
- Owner: Herbert P. Gardner
- Trainer: Clyde Van Dusen
- Record: 42: 12-7-8
- Earnings: $122,402

Major wins
- Kentucky Jockey Club Stakes (1928); Kentucky Derby (1929)

Clyde Van Dusen (1926–1948) was an American Thoroughbred racehorse and the winner of the 1929 Kentucky Derby.

== Background ==
Although he was a son of Man o' War, Clyde Van Dusen had an unimpressive appearance, being described as "a mere pony of a horse with a weedy frame." Owner/breeder Herbert Gardner, an Amsterdam, New York businessman, named the horse after his trainer, former jockey Clyde Van Dusen. Van Dusen said, "Clyde is a little horse, and that is why Mr. Gardner named him after me."

== Racing career ==
Clyde Van Dusen had a successful two-year-old season, winning the Kentucky Jockey Club Stakes, Orphanage Stakes, Valley Stakes, and Idle Hour Stakes. As a three-year-old, he lost a Kentucky Derby prep race to the Derby favorite and eventual Horse of the Year, Blue Larkspur, and he drew the #20 post position on Derby Day. Only Blue Larkspur was outside of him in the farthest post position, #21. His jockey, Linus McAtee, was startled by the horse's appearance and admitted to being "kind of scared" before the race. The race was run in a downpour, and unlike Blue Larkspur, Clyde Van Dusen was wearing mud caulks on the sloppy track. As a result, he was never seriously threatened and won by 2 lengths, with a time of 2:10 4/5, one of the slowest winning times in Derby history. After the race, Blue Larkspur's owner, Colonel Edward R. Bradley, called Clyde Van Dusen "the worst horse to win the Derby in twenty years." Clyde Van Dusen was the seventh gelding to win the Kentucky Derby in the race's first 55 runnings. It was 74 years before another gelding (Funny Cide) won the race.

After winning the Derby, Clyde Van Dusen finished in the money in several stakes, but he never won another major race. He retired in 1933 with a career record of 12 wins in 42 starts and $122,402 in earnings.

== Retirement ==
Following the horse's retirement, trainer Van Dusen acquired him and used him as an exercise pony.

Clyde Van Dusen was humanely euthanized in 1948 at the age of 22 due to the infirmities of old age.
