= Kentucky Jockey Club Stakes =

- Class: Grade II
- Location: Churchill Downs; Louisville, Kentucky, United States
- Inaugurated: 1920
- Race type: Thoroughbred – Flat racing
- Website: www.churchilldowns.com

Race information
- Distance: 1 1/16 miles (8.5 furlongs)
- Surface: Dirt
- Track: left-handed
- Qualification: Two-year-olds
- Weight: Assigned
- Purse: $400,000 (2024)

The Kentucky Jockey Club Stakes is an American Thoroughbred horse race run annually during the last week of November at Churchill Downs in Louisville, Kentucky. A Grade II event, the race is open to two-year-olds willing to race one and one-sixteenth miles on the dirt, and is a Road to the Kentucky Derby race, offering points to the top four horses towards being one of the 18 horses eligible for the race by points in North American races (there are spots available to European and Asian horses which participate in races in their respective continents, but if they decline, those spots go to the next highest in points from the North American events).

Inaugurated in 1920, the Kentucky Jockey Club Stakes was contested at a distance of one mile from its inception through 1979. The race was transferred to the Latonia Race Track in Covington, Kentucky in 1931 but returned to Churchill Downs in 1934.

There was no race run between 1939 and 1945 because of World War II.

== Historical notes ==
Five horses have won the Kentucky Jockey Club Stakes and then returned the next spring to win the Kentucky Derby. The most recent Derby winner was Super Saver (2010). Prior winners were Cannonade (1974), Twenty Grand (1931), Clyde Van Dusen (1929) and Reigh Count (1928).

In 1930, Twenty Grand won the Kentucky Jockey Club Stakes in a track record time of 1:36 flat which at the time was the fastest mile ever run by a two-year-old in the United States.

In 1933, Mata Hari became the first filly to win the Kentucky Jockey Club Stakes.

== Records ==
Speed record: (at current distance of 1 1/16 miles)

- 1:42.83 – Super Saver (2009)

Most wins by a jockey

- 4 – Calvin H. Borel (2000, 2008, 2009, 2014)

Most wins by a trainer

- 3 – D. Wayne Lukas (1989, 1991, 1997)

Most wins by an owner

- 4 – John C. Oxley (1994, 2008, 2012, 2015)

== Winners ==
Year	Winner	Jockey	Trainer	Owner	Distance	Time	Win $	Gr.
2025	Further Ado	Irad Ortiz Jr.	Brad H. Cox	Spendthrift Farm	1-1/16 m	1:43.33	$400,000	G2
2024	First Resort	Luis Saez	Eoin G. Harty	Godolphin Racing LLC	1-1/16 m	1:43.01	$238,440	G2
2023	Honor Marie	Rafael Bejarano	D. Whitworth Beckman	Ribble Farms LLC	1-1/16 m	1:44.31	$97,500	G2
2022	Instant Coffee	Luis Saez	Brad H. Cox	Gold Square LLC	1-1/16 m	1:45.25	$97,500	G2
2021	Smile Happy	Corey Lanerie	Kenneth McPeek	Lucky Seven Stable	1-1/16 m	1:43.94	$234,410	G2
2020	Keepmeinmind	David Cohen	Robertino Diodoro	Cypress Creek, LLC & Arnold Bennewith	1-1/16 m	1:44.52	$119,040	G2
2019	Silver Prospector	Ricardo Santana Jr.	Steven M. Asmussen	Ed & Susie Orr	1-1/16 m	1:45.94	$180,420	G2
2018	Signalman	Brian Hernandez Jr.	Kenneth McPeek	Tommie M. Lewis, David A. Bersen, LLC, Magdalena Racing	1-1/16 m	1:45.29	$112,840	G2
2017	Enticed	Junior Alvarado	Kiaran McLaughlin	Godolphin	1-1/16 m	1:44.42	$114,080	G2
2016	McCraken	Brian Hernandez Jr.	Ian R. Wilkes	Whitham Thoroughbreds	1-1/16 m	1:44.15	$115,320	G2
2015	Airoforce	Julien Leparoux	Mark E. Casse	John C. Oxley	1-1/16 m	1:45.48	$114,080	G2
2014	El Kabeir	Calvin H. Borel	John P. Terranova II	Zayat Stables	1-1/16 m	1:44.82	$135,792	G2
2013	Tapiture	Jesus Lopez Castanon	Chuck Peery	Kevin Jacobsen	1-1/16 m	1:43.51	$104,279	G2
2012	Uncaptured	Miguel Mena	Mark E. Casse	John C. Oxley	1-1/16 m	1:44.97	$101,047	G2
2011	Gemologist	Javier Castellano	Todd A. Pletcher	WinStar Farm	1-1/16 m	1:44.46	$103,855	G2
2010	Santiva	Shaun Bridgmohan	Eddie Kenneally	Tom R. Walters	1-1/16 m	1:45.31	$100,254	G2
2009	Super Saver	Calvin H. Borel	Todd A. Pletcher	WinStar Farm	1-1/16 m	1:42.83	$113,832	G2
2008	Beethoven	Calvin H. Borel	John T. Ward Jr.	John C. Oxley	1-1/16 m	1:44.14	$99,994	G2
2007	Anak Nakal	Julien Leparoux	Nick Zito	Four Roses Thoroughbreds	1-1/16 m	1:43.16	$168,156	G2
2006	Tiz Wonderful	John R.Velazquez	Scott Blasi	Stonestreet Stable	1-1/16 m	1:42.84	$133,208	G2
2005	Private Vow	Shaun Bridgmohan	Steven M. Asmussen	Mike McCarty	1-1/16 m	1:45.80	$137,888	G2
2004	Greater Good	John McKee	Robert E. Holthus	Lewis G. Lakin	1-1/16 m	1:45.14	$138,384	G2
2003	The Cliff's Edge	Shane Sellers	Nick Zito	Robert V. LaPenta	1-1/16 m	1:45.50	$137,764	G2
2002	Soto	Larry Melancon	Michael W. Dickinson	Baron Georg von Ullman	1-1/16 m	1:44.67	$143,344	G2
2001	Repent	Tony D'Amico	Kenneth G. McPeek	Select Stable	1-1/16 m	1:44.42	$134,540	G2
2000	Dollar Bill	Calvin H. Borel	Dallas Stewart	Gary & Mary West	1-1/16 m	1:47.18	$135,656	G2
1999	Captain Steve	Robby Albarado	Bob Baffert	Michael E. Pegram	1-1/16 m	1:43.14	$143,840	G2
1998	Exploit	Chris McCarron	Bob Baffert	Bob & Beverly Lewis	1-1/16 m	1:44.16	$140,740	G2
1997	Cape Town	Willie Martinez	D. Wayne Lukas	Overbrook Farm	1-1/16 m	1:43.97	$142,228	G3
1996	Concerto	Carlos H. Marquez Jr.	John Tammaro III	Kinsman Stable	1-1/16 m	1:46.91	$142,104	G3
1995	Ide	Craig Perret	Peter M. Vestal	Peter Willmott	1-1/16 m	1:44.31	$97,500	G3
1994	Jambalaya Jazz	Sam Maple	John T. Ward Jr.	John C. Oxley	1-1/16 m	1:46.46	$97,500	G3
1993	War Deputy	Garrett Gomez	Anthony L. Reinstedler	Windfields Farm	1-1/16 m	1:46.75	$97,500	G3
1992	Wild Gale	Shane Sellers	Michael J. Doyle	Little Fish Stable Inc.	1-1/16 m	1:45.64	$105,918	G3
1991	Dance Floor	Chris Antley	D. Wayne Lukas	Oaktown Stable	1-1/16 m	1:45.21	$104,891	G3
1990	Richman	Pat Day	William I. Mott	William F. Lucas	1-1/16 m	1:45.40	$107,718	G3
1989	Grand Canyon	Ángel Cordero Jr.	D. Wayne Lukas	D. Wayne Lukas & Overbrook Farm	1-1/16 m	1:44.60	$95,550	G3

== Earlier winners ==
- 1988 – Tricky Creek
- 1987 – Notebook †
- 1986 – Mt. Pleasant
- 1985 – Mustin Lake
- 1984 – Fuzzy
- 1983 – Biloxi Indian
- 1982 – Highland Park
- 1981 – El Baba
- 1980 – Television Studio
- 1979 – King Neptune
- 1978 – Lot O Gold
- 1977 – Going Investor
- 1976 – Run Dusty Run
- 1975 – Play Boy
- 1974 – Circle Home
- 1973 – Cannonade
- 1972 – Puntilla
- 1971 – Windjammer
- 1970 – Line City
- 1969 – Evasive Action
- 1968 – Traffic Mark
- 1967 – Mr. Brogann
- 1966 – Lightning Orphan
- 1965 – War Censor
- 1964 – Umbrella Fella
- 1963 – Journalist
- 1962 – Sky Gem
- 1961 – Su Ka wa
- 1960 – Crimson Fury
- 1959 – Oil Wick
- 1958 – Winsome Winner
- 1957 – Hill Country
- 1956 – Federal Hill
- 1955 – Royal Sting
- 1954 – Prince Noor
- 1953 – Hasty Road
- 1952 – Straight Face
- 1951 – Sub Fleet
- 1950 – Pur Sang
- 1949 – Roman Bath
- 1948 – John's Joy
- 1947 – Bold Gallant
- 1946 – Double Jay
- 1939–1945 : no race
- 1938 – T M Dorsett
- 1937 – Mountain Ridge
- 1936 – Reaping Reward
- 1935 – Grand Slam
- 1934 – Nellie Flag
- 1933 – Mata Hari
- 1932 – The Darb
- 1931 – Kakapo
- 1930 – Twenty Grand
- 1929 – Desert Light
- 1928 – Clyde Van Dusen
- 1927 – Reigh Count
- 1926 – Valorous
- 1925 – Canter
- 1924 – Master Charlie
- 1923 – Wise Counsellor
- 1922 – Enchantment
- 1921 – Startle
- 1920 – Tryster
- † In 1987, Buoy won the race but was disqualified for interference and set back to second.

== See also ==
- Road to the Kentucky Derby
