= 1934 Women's Western Open =

American golf tournament

Coordinates: 45°28′38″N 122°45′44″W

The 1934 Women's Western Open was a golf competition held at Portland Golf Club in Raleigh Hills, Oregon near Portland. It was the 5th edition of the Women's Western Open. Marian McDougall won the championship in match play competition by defeating Bessie Riegel in the final match, 9 and 7.
