= 1934 Currie Cup =

Domestic rugby union competition

- Countries: South Africa
- Champions: Joint winners: Border (2nd title); Western Province (15th title)

The 1934 Currie Cup was the 18th edition of the Currie Cup, the premier domestic rugby union competition in South Africa.

The tournament was jointly won by Border (for the second time) and Western Province (for the 15th time).

== See also ==
- Currie Cup
