= High Quest =

American Thoroughbred racehorse

- Sire: Sir Gallahad III
- Grandsire: Teddy
- Dam: Etoile Filante
- Damsire: Fair Play
- Sex: Stallion
- Foaled: 1931
- Country: United States
- Color: Brown
- Breeder: Marshall Field III
- Owner: Brookmeade Stable
- Trainer: Robert A. Smith
- Record: 13: 6-3-1
- Earnings: $52,190

Major wins
- Eastern Shore Handicap (1933); Wood Memorial Stakes (1934); U.S. Triple Crown series: Preakness Stakes (1934)
- Last updated on December 20, 2006

High Quest (1931–1948) was an American Thoroughbred racehorse best known for winning the 1934 Preakness Stakes, the second leg of the U.S. Triple Crown series of races.

== Background ==
Sir Gallahad III, the sire of High Quest, had been purchased in 1926 from his owner in France by an American breeding syndicate made up of Robert A. Fairbairn, William Woodward Sr., Arthur B. Hancock, and High Quest's breeder, Marshall Field III.

Bob Smith, a trainer with a history of spotting talent, had been hired by heiress Isabel Dodge Sloane to stock her newly formed Brookmeade Stable. Smith purchased High Quest for $3,500 at the Saratoga Yearling Sales and that same year bought Time Clock for $700 and Cavalcade for $1,200. Time Clock won the Flamingo Stakes in 1934 while Cavalcade won the Kentucky Derby, Horse of the Year honors, and was later inducted into the National Museum of Racing and Hall of Fame.

== Racing career ==
Racing at age two, High Quest won an allowance race at Saratoga Race Course, defeating future Hall of Famer Discovery. In the prestigious Hopeful Stakes for two-year-olds, he again defeated Discovery but finished second to a filly named Bazaar. In the Eastern Shore Handicap at Havre de Grace Racetrack in Maryland, High Quest beat Discovery for the third time as well as stablemate Cavalcade.

In 1934, en route to the U.S. Triple Crown races, the three-year-old High Quest won the important Wood Memorial Stakes. His stablemates Cavalcade and Time Clock were entered in the Kentucky Derby, finishing first and seventh respectively. High Quest then replaced Time Clock in the Preakness Stakes and under California jockey Bobby Jones scored the most important win of his career by defeating stablemate Cavalcade by a nose.

Despite sustaining an injury in the Withers Stakes, High Quest competed in the third leg of the Triple Crown series, finishing second in the Belmont Stakes to the Joseph E. Widener colt Peace Chance. An injury shortly before the Arlington Classic ruled him out for the rest of the year and he did not race again.

== Stud record ==
Retired to stud duty, unlike his prominent father, High Quest was less than successful in producing stakes winners with 1946 Santa Anita Handicap winner War Knight probably the best of the lot.

== Breeding ==
Pedigree of High Quest
Sire Sir Gallahad bay 1920	Teddy bay 1913	Ajax	Flying Fox
Sire Sir Gallahad bay 1920	Teddy bay 1913	Ajax	Amie
Sire Sir Gallahad bay 1920	Teddy bay 1913	Rondeau	Bay Ronald
Sire Sir Gallahad bay 1920	Teddy bay 1913	Rondeau	Doremi
Sire Sir Gallahad bay 1920	Plucky Liege bay 1912	Spearmint	Carbine
Sire Sir Gallahad bay 1920	Plucky Liege bay 1912	Spearmint	Maid of the Mint
Sire Sir Gallahad bay 1920	Plucky Liege bay 1912	Concertina	St. Simon
Sire Sir Gallahad bay 1920	Plucky Liege bay 1912	Concertina	Comic Song
Dam Etoile Filante ch. 1918	Fair Play ch. 1905	Hastings	Spendthrift
Dam Etoile Filante ch. 1918	Fair Play ch. 1905	Hastings	Cinderella
Dam Etoile Filante ch. 1918	Fair Play ch. 1905	Fairy Gold	Bend Or
Dam Etoile Filante ch. 1918	Fair Play ch. 1905	Fairy Gold	Dame Masham
Dam Etoile Filante ch. 1918	Chit Chat bay 1913	Rock Sand	Sainfoin
Dam Etoile Filante ch. 1918	Chit Chat bay 1913	Rock Sand	Roquebrune
Dam Etoile Filante ch. 1918	Chit Chat bay 1913	Chinkara	Galopin
Dam Etoile Filante ch. 1918	Chit Chat bay 1913	Chinkara	Raker
