= Silvio Coucci =

American jockey (1914–1942)

Personal information
- Born: 1914 New York, U.S.
- Died: January 5, 1942 (aged 27–28)
- Occupation: Jockey

Horse racing career
- Sport: Horse racing
- Career wins: Not found

Major racing wins
- American Derby (1932); Arlington Classic (1932); Spinaway Stakes (1932); American Legion Handicap (1933, 1934); Fall Highweight Handicap (1933); Juvenile Stakes (1933, 1934); National Stallion Stakes (1933, 1934); Dwyer Stakes (1934); Empire City Handicap (1934); Rowe Memorial Handicap (1934, 1935); Suburban Handicap (1934); Alabama Stakes (1935); Bahamas Stakes (1935); Futurity Stakes (1935); Christmas Stakes (1935); Chesapeake Stakes (1935); Santa Anita Derby (1935); Santa Maria Handicap (1935); Travers Stakes (1935); San Vicente Stakes (1939)

Racing awards
- United States Champion Jockey by earnings (1935)

Significant horses
- Gillie, Gusto, Faireno, Ladysman, Tintagel
- Updated on January 16, 2007

Silvio Coucci (1914 – January 5, 1942) was an American Thoroughbred horse racing jockey.

A New Yorker, in 1931 Silvio Coucci rode Thoroughbreds at Agua Caliente racetrack in Tijuana, Mexico under contract with brothers John and George Coburn. His performance brought him to the attention of the extremely wealthy Mrs. Payne Whitney, owner of the prominent Greentree Stable in Red Bank, New Jersey. Mrs. Whitney bought out Coucci's contract and in 1932 the seventeen-year-old jockey burst onto the American racing scene with such success that he was being hailed as "The second Earl Sande." That year he rode Greentree Stable's Easy Play to victory in the Spinaway Stakes and for owner Morton L. Schwartz was aboard Gusto for his wins in the 1932 American Derby as well as in the Arlington Classic which at the time had the largest purse of any American horse race.

Coucci's career continued to flourish and in 1934 his victories included the Christmas Stakes, in California and on the East Coast, New York's Suburban Handicap. He wound up the year second in the jockey standings behind Wayne D. Wright then the following year was the United States Champion Jockey by earnings with $319,760 in purse money. Riding at race tracks across the United States, some of his important wins en route to the 1935 jockey title came in the Santa Anita Derby, Alabama Stakes, Travers Stakes and the Futurity Stakes aboard that year's Champion 2-Year-Old Colt, Tintagel.

During his career, Silvio Coucci rode for other notable owners such as Isabel Dodge Sloane, William R. Coe, Alexander Pantages and Alfred G. Vanderbilt II for whom he won the 1939 San Vicente Stakes.

On January 5, 1942 TIME magazine reported that 27-year-old Silvio Coucci died as the result of a leap or fall from a hotel window in Fayetteville, North Carolina.
