= Arlington-Washington Lassie Stakes =

Arlington-Washington Lassie Stakes (discontinued)
- Class: Listed
- Location: Arlington Park; Arlington Heights, Illinois, United States
- Inaugurated: 1929
- Final run: 2021
- Race type: Thoroughbred – Flat racing
- Website: www.arlingtonpark.com

Race information
- Distance: 7 furlongs
- Track: Synthetic, left-handed
- Qualification: Two-Year-Old Fillies
- Weight: Assigned
- Purse: $75,000

The Arlington-Washington Breeders' Cup Lassie Stakes was an American Thoroughbred horse race held annually in mid September at Arlington Park Racetrack in Arlington Heights, Illinois. Raced on Polytrack synthetic dirt over a distance of seven furlongs, the race was open to Two-Year-Old Fillies and offered a purse of $75,000. It was a Grade III race through 2012, but was a listed stakes in 2013.

Inaugurated in 1929 as the Arlington Lassie Stakes, in 1963 it was renamed the Arlington-Washington Lassie Stakes and in 2005 was given the Breeders' Cup designation.

The race was contested at various distances:

- 1929–1931 : 5 1/2 furlongs
- 1932–1961 & 1972–1979 : 6 furlongs
- 1962–1969 : 6 1/2 furlongs
- 1980–1984 & 1986–1987 : 7 furlongs
- 1985 : 6 1/2 furlongs (at Hawthorne Race Course)
- 1986–2013 : 1 mile
- 2014–2021 : 7 furlongs

The race was not run in 1970, 1971, 1988, 1995, 1998, 1999 and 2020.

After the closure of Arlington Park in 2021, the race was discontinued.

== Records ==
Time record: (at one mile distance)

- 1:35.93 – Original Spin (2005)

Largest winning margin:

- 12 lengths – Eliza (1992)

Most wins by an owner:

- 4 – Calumet Farm (1937, 1943, 1947, 1949)

Most wins by a jockey:

- 5 – Steve Brooks (1949, 1952, 1954, 1959, 1960)

Most wins by a trainer:

- 2 – Ben A. Jones (1938, 1943)
- 2 – Howard Wells (1942, 1950)
- 2 – J. Hodgins (1946, 1952)
- 2 – Horace A. Jones (1947, 1949)
- 2 – Harry Trotsek (1951, 1953)
- 2 – Moody Jolley (1954, 1959)
- 2 – Joe Pierce Jr. (1969, 1972)
- 2 – Woody Stephens (1983, 1984)
- 2 – Michael L. Reavis (1994, 2010)

== Winners ==
Year	Winner	Jockey	Trainer	Owner	Time
2021	Chacalosa	Javier Tavares	Earl W. Hughes	Earl W. Hughes	1:25.53
2019	Mom's Red Lipstick	Jose Lopez	Chris Block	Lothenbach Stables, Inc.	1:24.55
2018	Into Trouble	Christopher Emigh	Ben Colebrook	Donamire Farm	1:24.97
2017	Bet She Wins	Jose Lopez	Chris Block	Lothenbach Stables	1:24.43
2016	Diadura	Carlos Marquez Jr.	Michael Stidham	Empyrean Stables/Two Princesses	1:25.10
2015	Marquee Miss	Emmanuel Esquivel	Ingrid Mason	Joe Ragsdale	1:24.29
2014	Quality Rocks	Rosemary Homeister Jr.	William Helmbrecht	Destiny Oaks Of Ocala LLC	1:24.88
2013	She's Offlee Good	Eddie Castro	Richard R. Scherer	Holmark Stables II	1:37.98
2012	Gold Edge	Chris Emigh	Lon Wiggins	Dolphus C. Morrison	1:37.96
2011	Rocket Twentyone	Eusebio Razo Jr.	W. T. Howard	Frank Fletcher	1:39.13
2010	Wonderlandbynight	E. T. Baird	Michael L. Reavis	Mark Dedomenico LLC	1:36.65
2009	She Be Wild	Junior Alvarado	Wayne Catalano	Nancy Mazzoni	1:38.67
2008	C.S. Silk	Robby Albarado	Dale Romans	Pacella/Bonomo/Barbara	1:36.38
2007	Dreaming Of Liz	E. T. Baird	Wayne Catalano	Frank Calabrese	1:37.08
2006	Lisa M	Carlos Marquez Jr.	Dave Kassen	Larry Bielfeldt	1:38.90
2005	Original Spin	Jesse M. Campbell	Anthony Mitchell	Reineman Stable	1:35.93
2004	Culinary	Carlos Marquez Jr.	Michael Stidham	J. H. Smith Thoroughbreds	1:36.98
2003	Zosima	Pat Day	Eoin G. Harty	Darley Racing	1:36.02
2002	Moonlight Sonata	Shane Laviolette	William Helmbrecht	Woodbridge Farm	1:37.82
2001	Joanies Bella	Marlon St. Julien	Timothy E. Hamm	D. Martin / J. Ayres	1:39.34
2000	Thunder Bertie	Jeremy Beasley	Bernard Flint	R. B. & E. Klein	1:36.91
1997	Silver Maiden	Shane Laviolette	Britt McGehee	Frank Calabrese	1:37.54
1996	Southern Playgirl	Randy Romero	Harvey L. Vanier	Nancy Vanier	1:38.27
1994	Shining Light	Juvenal L. Diaz	Michael L. Reavis	Flaxbeard/Oliphant/Sharp	1:41.70
1993	Mariah's Storm	Robert N. Lester	Donnie K. Von Hemel	Thunderhead Farm	1:38.95
1992	Eliza	Pat Valenzuela	Alex Hassinger Jr.	Allen E. Paulson	1:39.58
1991	Speed Dialer	Pat Day	Neil J. Howard	E. S. Hudson & W. Farish	1:36.58
1990	Through Flight	Joe Johnson	Larry D. Edwards	L. & B. Millsap	1:39.00
1989	Trumpet's Blare	Laffit Pincay Jr.	Warren A. Croll Jr.	Robert P. Levy	1:38.60
1987	Joe's Tammie	Craig Perret	Darrell Vienna	David Milch	1:25.00
1986	Delicate Vine	Gary Stevens	Robert J. Frankel	G. Alsdorf/Frankel/Moss	1:23.40
1985	Family Style	Laffit Pincay Jr.	D. Wayne Lukas	Eugene V. Klein	1:18.00
1984	Contredance	Pat Day	Woody Stephens	Henryk de Kwiatkowski	1:27.00
1983	Miss Oceana	Eddie Maple	Woody Stephens	Newstead Farm	1:23.40
1982	For Once'n My Life	Eddie Maple	Thomas V. Smith	Joan Masterson	1:23.40
1981	Millingo	Ray Sibille	George J. Getz	Nickels & Dimes Stable	1:23.20
1980	Truly Bound	Bill Shoemaker	Bud Delp	Windfields Farm	1:25.20
1979	Sissy's Time	Earlie Fires	J. Bert Sonnier	M. Selz & B. Smeker	1:11.00
1978	It's In The Air	Ed Delahoussaye	Lou M. Goldfine	Harbor View Farm	1:09.60
1977	Stub	Ron Turcotte	James E. Picou	Marge Schott	1:10.40
1976	Special Warmth	Sam Maple	Larry Flakes	L. C. Wilson/H. Inman/G. B. Gabbert	1:10.40
1975	Dearly Precious	Michael Hole	Stephen A. DiMauro	Richard E. Bailey	1:11.20
1974	Hot n Nasty	Darrel McHargue	Gordon R. Potter	Dan Lasater	1:11.40
1973	Special Team	Álvaro Pineda	John W. Russell	Fred W. Hooper	1:11.00
1972	Double Your Fun	Larry Melancon	Larry Robideaux Jr.	W. S. Woodside/F. Webster Jr.	1:12.00
1972	Natural Sound	Jorge Tejeira	Joseph Pierce Jr.	W. P. Burke/S. Pierce	1:11.60
1969	Clover Lane	Bill Shoemaker	Joseph Pierce Jr.	Seymour Rose	1:18.40
1968	Process Shot	Chuck Baltazar	John B. Bond	M/M Sonny Werblin	1:17.40
1967	Shenow	Laffit Pincay Jr.	Dick Posey	Everett Lowrance	1:18.40
1966	Mira Femme	Ismael Valenzuela	Irv Guiney	Verne Winchell	1:16.80
1965	Silver Bright	Jimmy Nichols	Robert L. Wheeler	C. V. Whitney	1:18.20
1964	Admiring	Bill Hartack	Hirsch Jacobs	Ethel D. Jacobs	1:18.00
1963	Sari's Song	Bill Shoemaker	Jess Byrd	J. Kel Houssels	1:18.20
1962	Smart Deb	Manuel Ycaza	Arnold N. Winick	Marion Reineman	1:16.20
1961	Rudoma	Bill Hartack	LeRoy Jolley	Mrs. Moody Jolley	1:11.20
1960	Colfax Maid	Steve Brooks	W. J. Schmidt	Schmidt & Trimble	1:11.80
1959	Monarchy	Steve Brooks	Moody Jolley	Claiborne Farm	1:10.00
1958	Dark Vintage	Johnny Heckmann	E. B. Carpenter	North Star Ranch	1:10.80
1957	Poly Hi	Eric Guerin	George M. Odom	Mrs. S. George Zauderer	1:10.60
1956	Leallah	Bill Hartack	MacKenzie Miller	Charlton Clay	1:11.60
1955	Judy Rullah	Dave Erb	Strother Griffin	Bwamazon Farm	1:13.80
1954	Delta	Steve Brooks	Moody Jolley	Claiborne Farm	1:10.40
1953	Queen Hopeful	John H. Adams	Harry Trotsek	Hasty House Farm	1:10.60
1952	Fulvous	Steve Brooks	Jack C. Hodgins	Mary V. Fisher	1:13.80
1951	Princess Lygia	Kenneth Church	Harry Trotsek	Mrs. H. Trotsek	1:11.20
1950	Shawnee Squaw	A. D. Rivera	Howard Wells	Sunningdale Farm	1:12.00
1949	Duchess Peg	Steve Brooks	Horace A. Jones	Calumet Farm	1:15.60
1948	Pail Of Water	Warren Mehrtens	Max Hirsch	Edward Lasker	1:12.40
1947	Bewitch	Douglas Dodson	Horace A. Jones	Calumet Farm	1:10.80
1946	Four Winds	Irving Anderson	Jack C. Hodgins	Dixiana Stables	1:12.00
1945	Beaugay	John H. Adams	Tom Smith	Maine Chance Farm	1:12.20
1944	Expression	Ferril Zufelt	John M. Gaver Sr.	Greentree Stable	1:12.40
1943	Twilight Tear	Nick Jemas	Ben A. Jones	Calumet Farm	1:13.20
1942	Fad	Arthur Craig	Howard Wells	Walmac Farm	1:13.60
1941	Petrify	Ruperto Donoso	Alfred Holberg	Alfred G. Vanderbilt II	1:12.60
1940	Blue Delight	Albert Snider	Roscoe Goose	Mrs. John Marsch	1:12.80
1939	Now What	Raymond Workman	Bud Stotler	Alfred G. Vanderbilt II	1:13.00
1938	Inscoelda	Chance Rollins	Ben A. Jones	Woolford Farm	1:11.60
1937	Theen	Irving Anderson	Frank J. Kearns	Calumet Farm	1:11.80
1936	Apogee	Earl Steffen	Duval A. Headley	Hal Price Headley	1:13.20
1935	Forever Yours	Don Meade	Robert V. McGarvey	Milky Way Farm Stable	1:12.80
1934	Motto	Raymond Workman	Thomas J. Healey	C. V. Whitney	1:13.40
1933	Mata Hari	Robert Jones	Clyde Van Dusen	Dixiana Farm	1:12.00
1932	Hilena	Raymond Workman	Kay Spence	Audley Farm Stable	1:10.40
1931	Top Flight	Alfred Robertson	Thomas J. Healey	C. V. Whitney	1:05.20
1930	Risque	Earl Steffen	Willie Knapp	Fanny Hertz	1:05.80
1929	Capture	Elmore Shropshire	John Lowe	Rancocas Stable	1:06.00
