= Havre de Grace Racetrack =

Former American horse racing track

Coordinates: 39°31′59″N 76°6′15″W

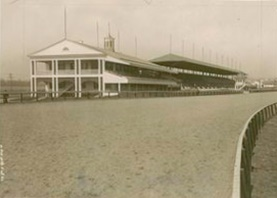
- Interactive map of Havre de Grace Racetrack
- Location: Havre de Grace, Maryland, United States
- Owned by: Harford Agricultural and Breeders Association
- Date opened: August 24, 1912
- Date closed: 1950
- Course type: Flat

The Havre de Grace Racetrack was an American horse racing track on Post Road in Havre de Grace, Harford County, Maryland. Nicknamed "The Graw," it operated from August 24, 1912, to 1950. For a time, it was owned by the Harford Agricultural and Breeders Association and also by the notorious gambler Arnold Rothstein.

The Havre de Grace Handicap was one of the important races in the American northeast for many years. Its winners include U.S. Racing Hall of Fame inductees Roamer, Crusader, Seabiscuit, Sun Beau, Equipoise, and Challedon. Some Hall of Fame horses lost this race. In the 1919 running, Cudgel beat two Hall of Famers: Exterminator and Triple Crown champion Sir Barton.

On September 29, 1920, Man o' War won the Potomac Handicap at Havre de Grace. His son, U.S. Triple Crown winner War Admiral, won his first race here on April 25, 1936.

Other stakes races at the track included Aberdeen Stakes, Chesapeake Stakes, Eastern Shore Stakes, and Harford Handicap.

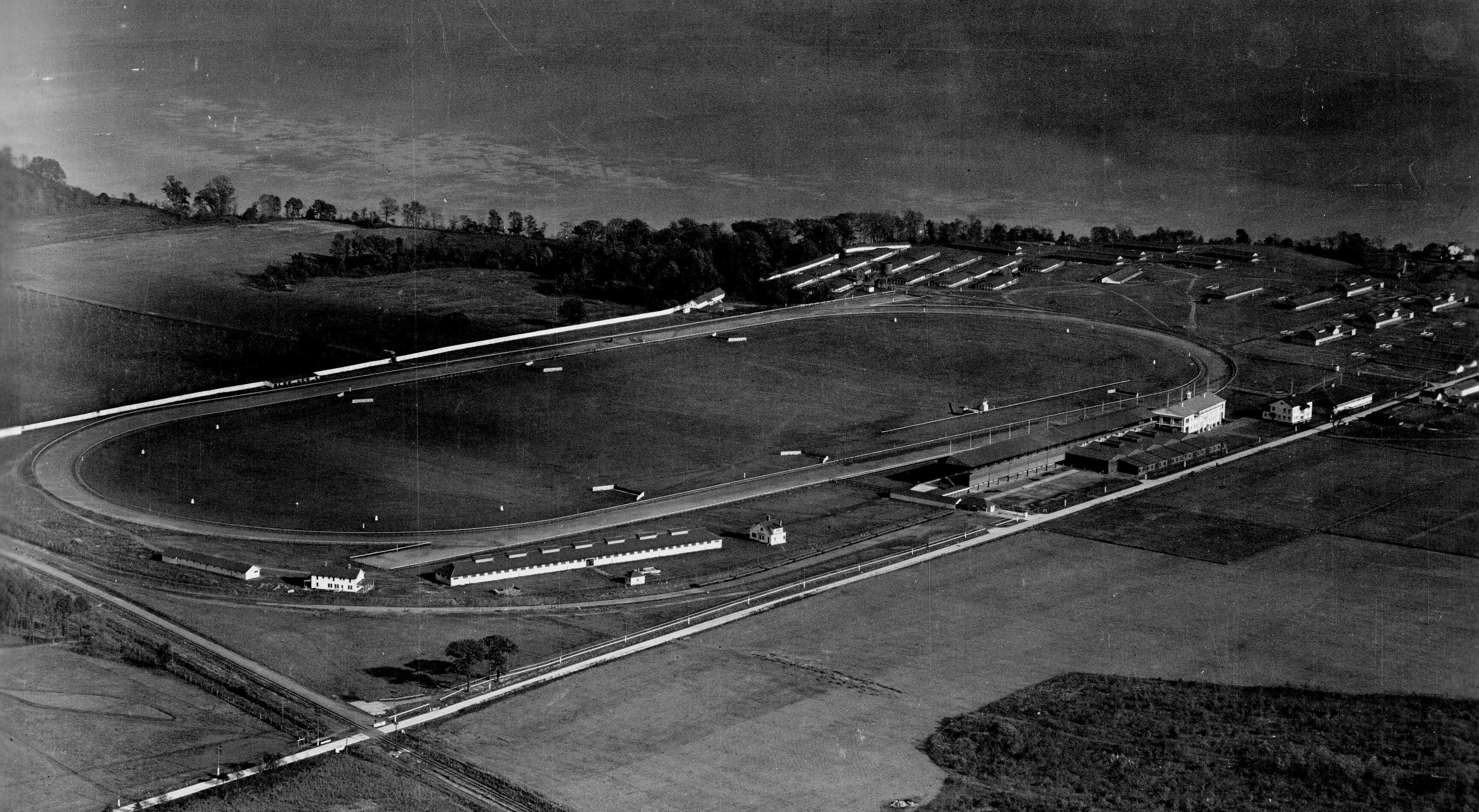
Aerial shot of the racetrack

The track was located halfway between the cities of Philadelphia and Washington, D.C. In the 1940s, it began losing customers to Delaware Park Racetrack and Garden State Park Racetrack in New Jersey. By 1949, its owners were forced to turn over some of their allotted racing days to Baltimore's Pimlico Race Course. In January 1951, the Havre de Grace Racetrack was sold to Alfred G. Vanderbilt II, owner of Pimlico, and Morris Schapiro of Laurel Park Racecourse, who closed the facility and transferred the track's racing allotment dates to their own tracks.

The Havre de Grace Racetrack is now the property of the Maryland National Guard, which uses the former clubhouse as offices. The grandstand, minus the canopy, has been converted into a warehouse. Nothing of the actual track remains, but an aerial view reveals a curved line of trees along the final turn.

== In popular culture ==
The Havre de Grace Racetrack is among several racetracks mentioned as part of the ruse in the motion picture The Sting. In the climactic scene, when Doyle Lonnegan enters the parlor to make the final bet, J. J. Singleton can be heard reporting, "At Havre de Grace, the winner Light Chatter paid 5.40, 2.80, and 2.40..."
