= Brookmeade Stable =

Thoroughbred racehorse stable

- Company type: Thoroughbred racing stable and horse breeding farm
- Industry: Thoroughbred horse racing
- Founded: 1924
- Defunct: 1962
- Headquarters: Upperville, Virginia
- Key people: Isabel Dodge Sloane, owner Trainers: William M. Garth; Robert A. Smith; Preston M. Burch; J. Elliott Burch

Brookmeade Stable was a thoroughbred horse racing stable owned by Dodge automobile heiress and socialite Isabel Dodge Sloane. Sloane first won using the name Brookmeade Stable at the Manly Memorial Steeplechase at Pimlico in 1924.

In 1929, Sloane divorced and expanded her interest in horse racing. She purchased 850 acres (3.4 km^{2}) in Upperville, Virginia, again using the name Brookmeade Stable. Sloane later developed the estate into a breeding farm, Brookmeade Stud, producing several successful race horses, including Sword Dancer.

== U.S. Triple Crown successes ==
Brookmeade Stable won each of the three races constituting the American Triple Crown series. The first win came in the 1934 Kentucky Derby with Cavalcade then his stablemate High Quest won that year's 1934 Preakness Stakes. Bold gave Brookmeade Stable its second Preakness win in the 1951 event. In 1959, Sword Dancer completed the triple with a victory in the final leg of the series, the Belmont Stakes.

Brookmeade Stable also won the most prestigious steeplechase event in the United States, the American Grand National. His Boots won the race in 1949 and again in 1953.

Brookmeade's success allowed Sloane to become the first woman to lead the United States in race earning in 1934, with $251,138.

The stables of Brookmeade in Upperville, Virginia are now a part of Lazy Lane Farms.
