= Cavalcade (horse) =

American-bred Thoroughbred racehorse

- Sire: Lancegaye
- Grandsire: Swynford
- Dam: Hastily
- Damsire: Hurry On
- Sex: Stallion
- Foaled: 1931
- Country: United States
- Color: Brown
- Breeder: F. Wallis Armstrong
- Owner: Brookmeade Stable
- Trainer: Robert Smith
- Record: 22: 8-5-3
- Earnings: $127,165

Major wins
- American Derby (1934); Arlington Classic (1934); Detroit Derby (1934) American Classic Race wins: Kentucky Derby (1934)

Awards
- U.S. Champion 2-Year-old Colt (1933); U.S. Champion 3-Year-old Colt (1934); American Horse of the Year (1934)

Honors
- United States Racing Hall of Fame (1993); Cavalcade Drive in Danville, Kentucky

Cavalcade (1931–1940) was an American Hall of Fame Champion Thoroughbred racehorse. In a career which lasted from 1933 until 1936 he ran twenty-two times and won eight races. He was best known for his performances as a three-year-old in 1934 when his wins included the Kentucky Derby, the American Derby, and the Arlington Classic. His subsequent career was disappointing and he failed to make a significant impact in a brief stud career.

== Background ==
Cavalcade was a brown horse sired by Lancegaye, a successful British racehorse who won the Hardwicke Stakes and finished second in The Derby in 1926. Cavalcade's dam, Hastily, was sold in foal to Lancegaye at Newmarket in December 1930 and exported to Meadow View Farm near Morristown, New Jersey where she gave birth to Cavalcade the following spring. Cavalcade was sometimes described as being "English bred" but although he was conceived in Britain he was foaled in the United States, making him technically American-bred.

In the early 1930s, Bob Smith, a trainer with a history of spotting talent, had been hired by heiress Isabel Dodge Sloane to stock her newly formed Brookmeade Stable. Cavalcade was purchased as a yearling at Saratoga for $1,200. Among the other yearlings Smith bought for Brookmeade Stable that year were Time Clock for $700 and High Quest for $3,500. Cavalcade was ridden in most of his important races by Mack Garner.

== Racing career ==
=== 1933:two-year-old season ===
In his two-year-old racing season, Cavalcade showed promise by winning twice from eleven starts and running prominently in defeat in several important races. In July in Chicago, Cavalcade recorded an upset win in the Hyde Stakes, beating the Whitney colt Singing Wood by a neck at odds of 90/1. At Havre de Grace Racetrack in September he finished a length second to his stablemate High Quest in the Eastern Shore Handicap. In a year when no colt dominated his age group, Cavalcade was among the best, although there were no official champions named in American racing until 1936.

=== 1934: three-year-old season ===
Cavalcade's 1934 campaign was marked by his dominance of the future Hall of Fame colt Discovery whom he first defeated in the Chesapeake Stakes at Havre de Grace. Cavalcade set a new race record time of 1:43.6 for one and one sixteenth of a mile to establish himself as a "Leading Derby Candidate." Four days earlier he had equaled the track record for one mile and seventy yards when winning the Shenandoah Purse at the same track.

Of their three very capable colts, for the Kentucky Derby Brookmeade Stable raced Cavalcade as well as Time Clock, who had won the Flamingo Stakes. Sent off as the bettors' heavy favorite, Cavalcade was towards the back of the field before moving into contention behind Discovery and the filly Mata Hari on the final turn. He took the lead in the straight and drew away to win the race by more than three lengths over Discovery with Time Clock a disappointing seventh. After Time Clock's poor showing, his handlers replaced him in the Preakness Stakes with the third stablemate, High Quest, who had won April's Wood Memorial. High Quest won the Preakness, beating Cavalcade by a nose with Discovery in third place.

Cavalcade skipped the longer Belmont Stakes (in which High Quest was defeated by Peace Chance) running instead in the American Derby in Chicago which he won by two lengths and six from Discovery and Singing Wood, conceding weight to both, in a course record time of 2:04.0. Press reports described his finishing run as "a machine-like burst" and claimed that he looked "almost unbeatable". Cavalcade then set a new track record in winning the Detroit Derby before returning to Chicago for the Arlington Classic. He came from last place in the early stages to win by four lengths from Discovery in a "dramatic" performance which provoked a "delirium of cheers" from the 30,000 crowd. After the race Mack Garner described the colt as "the gamest horse I have ever ridden." During the summer of 1934 there were proposals for special international race at either Saratoga Springs or Belmont Park between Cavalcade, the English champion Windsor Lad and the leading French colt Admiral Drake (Brantôme, probably the best European three-year old of 1934 was a sick horse during the summer) but the plans did not come to fruition.

=== Later career ===
Cavalcade's later career was a disappointment as he became increasingly difficult to train. At age four, he missed his early season target when he was withdrawn from the Santa Anita Handicap and did not appear until late May when he finished second to the five-year-old Head Play at Belmont. Smith struggled to return Cavalcade to peak condition and he finished unplaced on his only other start of the year in the Suburban Handicap. After an absence of fifteen months, Cavalcade returned to action in September 1936 in an allowance race at Narragansett Park where he finished sixth of the seven runners. Two days later, he finished last of the nine runners behind Sun Teddy in what was intended to be a final warm-up for the Narragansett Special. He was then retired to stud.

== Stud record ==
Cavalcade was retired to stud duty at Sloane's Brookmeade Stud in Upperville, Virginia. In October 1940, at the age of nine, he was being transferred to stand at Shandon Farm near Lexington, Kentucky when he contracted "Shipping fever" and died. Of his limited number of offspring, the most notable was the gelding Dinner Party, who won 37 steeplechase races. Cavalcade was interred at the Brookmeade Stud.

== Honors ==
Cavalcade ended the 1934 racing season with six wins and a second in his seven starts and as the highest money earner was recognised as the Champion 3-Year-old Colt and Horse of the Year although there was no formal award.

On August 20, 1934, Cavalcade was featured on the cover of Time.

Cavalcade was inducted in the United States' National Museum of Racing and Hall of Fame in 1993.
