= Robert Augustus Smith =

Robert A. Smith
Personal information
- Born: 1869 Newburgh, New York, United States
- Died: December 5, 1942 (aged 72–73) Yonkers, New York, United States
- Occupation: Trainer

Horse racing career
- Sport: Horse racing

Major racing wins
- Havre de Grace Handicap (1918, 1935); Toronto Cup Stakes (1920); Hopeful Stakes (1923, 1934); Coaching Club American Oaks (1925); Cowdin Stakes (1925); Washington Handicap (1926); Clover Stakes (1927); Rosedale Stakes (1927); Columbus Handicap (1928); Empire City Handicap (1928); Endurance Handicap (1928); Great American Stakes (1928); Jennings Handicap (1928); Jerome Stakes (1929); Pimlico Oaks (1928, 1929); Arlington Classic (1933, 1934); Toboggan Handicap (1933, 1934); Travers Stakes (1933); American Derby (1934); Chesapeake Stakes (1934); Flamingo Stakes (1934); Sanford Stakes (1934); Champlain Handicap (1935); Shevlin Stakes (1936) U.S. Triple Crown series: Kentucky Derby (1934); Preakness Stakes (1934)

Racing awards
- United States Champion Thoroughbred Trainer by earnings (1933, 1934)

Honours
- National Museum of Racing and Hall of Fame (1976)

Significant horses
- Articulate, Bridal Flower, Cavalcade, Good Goods, Greyfield, High Quest, Diogenes, Edith Cavell, Florence Nightingale, Mars, Psychic Bid, Time Clock

Robert Augustus Smith (1869 - December 4, 1942) was a two-time U.S. National Champion trainer of Thoroughbred racehorses and a U. S. Racing Hall of Fame inductee who won the 1934 Kentucky Derby with Cavalcade and the 1934 Preakness Stakes with High Quest. In addition to his own, Smith trained horses to four National Championships including American Horse of the Year.
