= Charles T. Fisher =

American businessman and automotive pioneer (1880-1963)

- Born: February 16, 1880; Norwalk, Ohio
- Died: August 8, 1963 (aged 83); Detroit, Michigan
- Occupation(s): Businessman: Automotive pioneer Racehorse owner/breeder

Charles Thomas Fisher (February 16, 1880 – August 8, 1963) was an American businessman and an automotive pioneer.

Born in Norwalk, Ohio, Charles was the second son of Lawrence and Margaret Fisher. The family would grow to include seven boys and four girls. At the turn of the 20th century, eldest son Fred was the first to move to Detroit where an uncle, Albert Fisher, had established Standard Wagon Works during the latter part of the 1880s. A year later Charles Fisher joined his brother as an employee at the C. R. Wilson Company, a manufacturer of horse-drawn carriage bodies who were just beginning to construct bodies for the automobile makers.

With the fledgling automobile business about to emerge as a major industry, on July 23, 1908 Charles and Fred Fisher founded the Fisher Body Company together with their Uncle Albert. Soon, they brought their five younger brothers into the business. Highly successful, the Fishers expanded their operation into Canada, setting up a plant in Walkerville, Ontario and by 1914 their company had grown to become the world's largest manufacturer of auto bodies.

In 1919, the Fisher brothers sold sixty percent of their company to General Motors Corporation (GM). In 1926, Fisher Body Company became a subsidiary division of General Motors when the brothers sold their remaining forty percent and Charles Fisher was appointed a GM Vice-President.

== Competitive horse racing ==
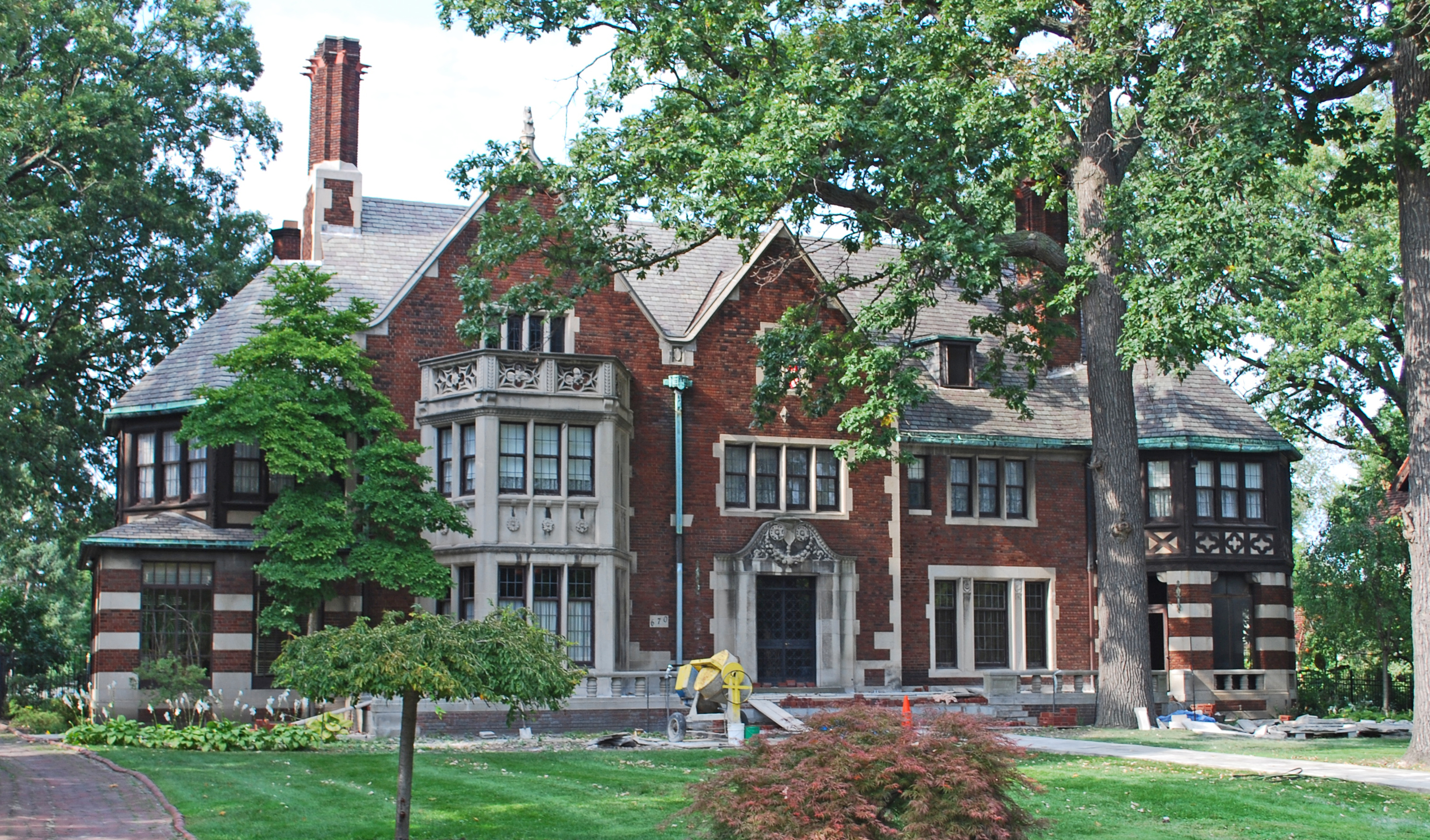
Tudor revival style mansion of Charles T. Fisher, president of Fisher Body corporation in Detroit's Boston-Edison Historic District designed by architect George Mason.

Charles Fisher became involved in the breeding and racing of Thoroughbreds. In 1928 he purchased the famous Dixiana Farm near Lexington, Kentucky which remained in his family for approximately 60 years. Notable among the horses raced by Charles Fisher were:

- Mata Hari - wins include the 1933 Arlington Lassie Stakes, Kentucky Jockey Club Stakes, Breeders' Futurity and in 1934 the Illinois Derby and Illinois Oaks. Considered the U.S. Champion Two Year Old Filly of 1933 and Champion Three Year Old Filly of 1934
- Sirocco - beat Gallahadion and Bimelech in winning the 1940 Arlington Classic.
- Amber Light - winner of the 1943 Louisiana Derby
- Sub Fleet - won 1951 Kentucky Jockey Club Stakes, 2nd in the 1952 Kentucky Derby, won the 1953 Hawthorne Gold Cup Handicap

Charles Fisher was also a yachting enthusiast and owned several power yachts including the 153 foot "Saramar III" built in 1930 by the Defoe Shipbuilding Company in Bay City, Michigan.

Charles Fisher and his wife Sarah had five children. Son Charles Jr. became president of the National Bank of Detroit and a director of the Reconstruction Finance Corporation during World War II.

In 1995, Charles T. Fisher was posthumously inducted in the Automotive Hall of Fame in Dearborn, Michigan.
