= Isabel Dodge Sloane =

American racehorse owner

- Born: February 26, 1896; Detroit, Michigan, U.S.
- Died: March 9, 1962 (aged 66); Palm Beach, Florida, U.S.
- Occupations: Heiress; Racehorse owner/breeder
- Organization: Brookmeade Stable
- Spouse: George Sloane (m. 1921; div. 1929)
- Parent(s): John Francis Dodge; Ivy Hawkins

Isabel Cleves Dodge Sloane (February 26, 1896 – March 9, 1962) was an American heiress and socialite who owned a major Thoroughbred horse racing stable and breeding farm.

Isabel Dodge was the second of three children of Canadian-born Ivy Hawkins (1864–1901) and John F. Dodge (1864–1920), the co-founder of the Dodge Brothers Motor Company in Detroit, Michigan. Her mother died of tuberculosis when she was six and she was raised by two stepmothers and a series of nannies. Educated at Detroit's exclusive Liggett School for Girls, her family's great wealth brought her in contact with America's social elite and in 1921 she married Manhattan stockbroker George Sloane.

Fond of a variety of sports, Isabel Dodge Sloane played golf and tennis and enjoyed fly fishing and game bird hunting. She and her husband were listed on the New York Social Register and attended Thoroughbred flat races at Belmont Park. However, it was in steeplechase racing that Isabel Dodge Sloane first became involved as an owner and in 1924 she won her first race under the name Brookmeade Stable. Although she would become a major figure in flat racing, Mrs. Sloane continued to own and compete in steeplechase events for the rest of her life and her gelding His Boots twice won the most prestigious steeplechase race in the U.S., the American Grand National. Her half-sister, Frances Dodge, was also heavily involved in horse racing and breeding and owned the renowned Castleton Farm near Lexington, Kentucky.

Isabel Dodge Sloane and her husband separated in 1928 and divorced in 1929, after which she substantially expanded her involvement in horse racing. Keeping her married name, Isabel Dodge Sloane owned homes in Locust Valley on Long Island and on Park Avenue, but in 1929 she purchased an 850-acre (3.4 km^{2}) property in Upperville, Virginia that she called Brookmeade Farm and entered the horse breeding part of the business. Although she hired top level farm managers, Sloane learned the intricacies of the breeding business. In a 1939 article in the New York World-Telegram, feature writer Elliott Arnold wrote that there wasn't a man in the business who knew more about Thoroughbreds than Isabel Dodge Sloane.

She also owned Concha Marina on Palm Beach in Florida as a winter retreat. Over 14 years she transformed the simple L-shaped home into a grand courtyard estate.

Sloane's Brookmeade Stable won many of the major graded stakes races in the United States including each of the American Classic Races. In 1934 she became the first woman to lead the American owners' list when she won the Kentucky Derby with future Hall of Fame colt Cavalcade and the Preakness Stakes with High Quest. In 1951, she became one of only three women to ever be the Guest of Honor at the annual testimonial dinner of the Thoroughbred Club of America. In 1954, she was elected vice-president of the Virginia Thoroughbred Association.

In 1959 Sloane captured the Belmont Stakes with another future Hall of Famer, Sword Dancer, then the following year her third Hall of Fame inductee, the filly Bowl of Flowers, was voted the 1960 U.S. Champion two-year-old filly and then U.S. Champion three-year-old filly in 1961. Isabel Dodge Sloane died the following year at the age of sixty-six.
