= 1936 Kentucky Derby =

Horse race

62nd Kentucky Derby
- Kentucky Derby
- Grade I stakes race
- Location: Churchill Downs
- Date: May 2, 1936
- Winning horse: Bold Venture
- Jockey: Ira Hanford
- Trainer: Max Hirsch
- Owner: Morton L. Schwartz
- Surface: Dirt

The 1936 Kentucky Derby was the 62nd running of the Kentucky Derby. The race took place on May 2, 1936.

== Full results ==
Finished	Post	Horse	Jockey	Trainer	Owner	Time / behind
1st	6	Bold Venture	Ira Hanford	Max Hirsch	Morton L. Schwartz	2:03.60
2nd	12	Brevity	Wayne D. Wright	Peter Coyne	Joseph E. Widener	
3rd	3	Indian Broom	George Burns	Darrell F. Cannon	A. C. T. Stock Farm Stable	
4th	15	Coldstream	Nick Wall	Albert B. Gordon	Coldstream Stud Stable (E. E. Dale Shaffer)	
5th	7	Bien Joli	Lester Balaski	Herbert J. Thompson	Edward R. Bradley	
6th	16	Holl Image	Herb Fisher	Jack Carter	Superior Stable (Jack Carter)	
7th	4	He Did	Charles Kurtsinger	J. Thomas Taylor	Suzanne B. Mason	
8th	9	Teufel	Herbert Litzenberger	James E. Fitzsimmons	Wheatley Stable	
9th	14	Gold Seeker	Maurice Peters	Richard E. Handlen	Foxcatcher Farms	
10th	2	Merry Pete	Tommy Malley	James E. Fitzsimmons	Belair Stud	
11th	8	The Fighter	Alfred M. Robertson	Robert V. McGarvey	Milky Way Farm Stable	
12th	11	Grand Slam	Raymond Workman	R. Emmett Potts	Bomar Stable (Charles B. Bohn & Peter A. Markey)	
13th	13	Sangreal	Willie Garner	Robert V. McGarvey	Milky Way Farm	
14th	5	Granville	James Stout	James E. Fitzsimmons	Belair Stud	

- Winning breeder: Morton L. Schwartz (KY)
