= Roy Waldron =

American racehorse trainer (1894–1963)

Personal information
- Born: April 3, 1894 Youngstown, Ohio, U.S.
- Died: May 15, 1963 (aged 69) Burbank, California U.S.
- Resting place: Long Island National Cemetery
- Occupation: Racehorse trainer

Horse racing career
- Sport: Horse racing

Major racing wins
- Edgemere Handicap (1922, 1937); Potomac Handicap (1922); Jockey Club Gold Cup (1924); Chesapeake Stakes (1925); Autumn Stakes (1931); Dwyer Stakes (1937); Clark Handicap (1940); San Vicente Stakes (1940); Lafayette Stakes (1941); Santa Barbara Handicap (1941); Shevlin Stakes (1942); Endurance Handicap (1945); U.S. Triple Crown wins: Kentucky Derby (1940)

Significant horses
- Gallahadion, Lord Boswell, Prince of Bourbon, Star Pilot

Roy J. Waldron (April 3, 1894 – May 15, 1963) was a batboy for the St. Louis Browns before he turned to training Thoroughbred racehorses. He is best known for winning the 1940 Kentucky Derby with Gallahadion, a colt he race conditioned for Ethel V. Mars of chocolate bar fame.

== Racing career and World War I service ==
Roy Waldron had a short career as a jockey but his ongoing employment in horse racing was interrupted by service in World War I with the United States Army, Fifth Company, 157th Depot Brigade. On his passing in 1963, Sgt. Waldron was interred in the Long Island National Cemetery.

When the War ended, Roy Waldron returned to racing as part of the training operations with Xalapa Farm in Paris, Kentucky under manager James McClelland. By the early 1920s he would be training a string of horses for the Lexington Stable, the nom de course for Xalapa owner Edward F. Simms and racing partner Henry W. Oliver. Waldron's most important win for the Lexington Stable came in the 1924 Jockey Club Gold Cup with My Play, a full brother to the great Man o' War. A decade later he became the second string trainer for the very prestigious Belair Stud Stable for whom he won the 1931 Autumn Stakes at Woodbine Racetrack in Toronto. In 1933 Roy Waldron was a second string trainer for another major owner, Joseph E. Widener. In 1934 he was training for Hope Iselin while also being very successful training selling-platers he owned.

=== The Milky Way years ===
After Hope Iselin decided to get out of racing, in August 1938 Roy Waldron accepted an offer to take over as trainer of the Milky Way Farm Stable of Ethel Mars. For the widow Mars, Thoroughbred racing was a passion and one pursued in a manner considerable wealth afforded her. A May 9, 1940 newspaper story subtitled "Candy Bar Queen Has Spent $500,000 For Horses Since '35" recounted her pursuit for racing success.

In 1939, Roy Waldron had his first Kentucky Derby starter for the Milky Way Stable even though he had advised Mrs. Mars he believed her colt On Location wasn't yet ready for the high level of competition in the Kentucky Derby's mile and a quarter distance. Waldron told her that he was concerned the colt could injure himself in a futile attempt. On Location finished last after future Hall of Fame jockey Alfred Robertson wisely pulled up the hopelessly beaten colt.

Going into the 1940 Kentucky Derby, Milky Way Farm's had Gallahadion as the entrant. He was a son of the Champion sire Sir Gallahad and his damsire was American Horse of the Year Reigh Count who had won the 1928 Kentucky Derby. Roy Waldron raced Gallahadion in California where he won the San Vicente Stakes at Santa Anita Park. Brought east to Churchill Downs, Gallahadion ran second in the Derby Trial to E. R. Bradley's reigning Champion Two-Year-old Colt Bimelech who was made the overwhelming 2-5 favorite for the Derby. Oddsmakers considered Mioland the only horse with even an outside chance of beating the undefeated Bimelech and sent the Charles Howard colt off as a 6:1 second choice with Gallahadion relegated to a 35:1 longshot.

Roy Waldron got his first and only Kentucky Derby victory when Gallahadion won under jockey Carroll Bierman. Heavy favorite Bimelech, who had led the race by a head after a mile and increased it to a half-length coming down the stretch, could not hold off the charge of Gallahadion who won by a length and a half. A 1942 pre-Derby story in the Milwaukee Journal described jockey Bierman's performance as "probably the best jockey job in derby history." In the ensuing Preakness Stakes, Bierman rode Gallahadion to a third-place finish behind runner-up Mioland and winner Bimelech who also went on to win the Belmont Stakes in which Gallahadion finished fifth in a six-horse field.

The Ethel Mars/Roy Waldron combination were back at Churchill Downs for the 1942 Kentucky Derby in which Dogpatch ran eighth in a field of fifteen. The duo returned the following year with No Wrinkles who finished sixth in a field of ten runners. They did not have another runner in the Kentucky Derby as Ethel Mars began reducing her involvement in racing. In late November 1945 Roy Waldron signed on with Maine Chance Farm owned by cosmetics tycoon Elizabeth Arden. Mrs. Arden was not easy for anyone to work for and had gone through many trainers prior to Waldron. The job did not last long and Waldron returned to buying and racing selling-platers while taking on smaller clients. In the 1950s he was training the topflight stable of Clifford Mooers.

Roy Waldron was retired when he died in Burbank, California in 1963.
