= 1942 Kentucky Derby =

Horse race

68th Kentucky Derby
- Kentucky Derby
- Grade I stakes race
- Location: Churchill Downs
- Date: May 2, 1942
- Winning horse: Shut Out
- Jockey: Wayne D. Wright
- Trainer: John M. Gaver Sr.
- Owner: Greentree Stable
- Surface: Dirt

The 1942 Kentucky Derby was the 68th running of the Kentucky Derby. The race took place on May 2, 1942.

== Full results ==
Finished	Post	Horse	Jockey	Trainer	Owner	Time / behind
1st	3	Shut Out	Wayne D. Wright	John M. Gaver Sr.	Greentree Stable	2:04 2/5
2nd	7	Alsab	Basil James	Sarge Swenke	Albert Sabath	
3rd	16	Valdina Orphan	Carroll Bierman	Frank Catrone	Valdina Farm	
4th	17	With Regards	Johnny Longden	Ted D. Grimes	Mr. & Mrs. Ted D. Grimes	
5th	2	First Fiddle	Conn McCreary	Edward L. Mulrenan	Mrs. Edward L. Mulrenan	
6th	5	Devil Diver	Eddie Arcaro	John M. Gaver Sr.	Greentree Stable	
7th	1	Fair Call	Herb Lindberg	Arthur Fletcher	Mill River Stable (Josephine Douglas)	
8th	12	Dogpatch	Jack Skelly	Roy Waldron	Milky Way Farm Stable	
9th	6	Hollywood	George Woolf	Frank Catrone	Valdina Farms	
10th	4	Sweep Swinger	Alfred Shelhamer	Alexis G. Wilson	Theodore D. Buhl	
11th	15	Apache	James Stout	James E. Fitzsimmons	Belair Stud	
12th	8	Sir War	Johnny Adams	William T. Anderson	Circle M Ranch (Edward S. Moore)	
13th	11	Fairy Manah	John Gilbert	Richard E. Handlen	Foxcatcher Farm	
14th	14	Requested	Leon Haas	J. H. "Blackie" McCoole	Florence Whitaker	
15th	13	Boot and Spur	Arthur Craig	William Molter	Elmer C. A. Berger	

- Winning breeder: Greentree Stable (KY)
