= 1940 Kentucky Derby =

Horse race

66th Kentucky Derby
- Kentucky Derby
- Grade I stakes race
- Location: Churchill Downs
- Date: May 4, 1940
- Winning horse: Gallahadion
- Jockey: Carroll Bierman
- Trainer: Roy Waldron
- Owner: Milky Way Farm Stable
- Surface: Dirt

The 1940 Kentucky Derby was the 66th running of the Kentucky Derby. The race took place on May 4, 1940.

== Full results ==
Finished	Post	Horse	Jockey	Trainer	Owner	Time / behind
1st	1	Gallahadion	Carroll Bierman	Roy Waldron	Milky Way Farm Stable	2:05 0/0
2nd	2	Bimelech	Fred A. Smith	William A. Hurley	Edward R. Bradley	
3rd	7	Dit	Leon Haas	Max Hirsch	W. Arnold Hanger	
4th	3	Mioland	Lester Balaski	R. Thomas Smith	Charles S. Howard	
5th	6	Sirocco	Johnny Longden	James W. Smith	Dixiana Stable	
6th	5	Roman	Kenneth McCombs	Daniel Stewart	Joseph E. Widener	
7th	8	Royal Man	John Gilbert	Moody Jolley	Tower Stable	
8th	9	Pictor	George Woolf	Louis Schaefer	William L. Brann	

- Winning breeder: Robert A. Fairbairn (KY)
