= 1925 Preakness Stakes =

50th running of the Preakness Stakes

50th Preakness Stakes
- The Preakness Stakes
- Location: Pimlico Race Course; Baltimore, Maryland, U.S.
- Date: May 8, 1925
- Distance: 1 3/16 mi (9.5 furlongs; 1,900 m)
- Winning horse: Coventry
- Winning time: 1:59 0/0
- Final odds: 21.80-1
- Jockey: Clarence Kummer
- Trainer: William B. Duke
- Owner: Gifford A. Cochran
- Conditions: Fast
- Surface: Dirt

The 1925 Preakness Stakes was the 50th running of the $50,000 Preakness Stakes horse race for three-year-old Thoroughbreds . The race took place on May 8, 1925, and was run 8 days before the 1925 Kentucky Derby. Ridden by Clarence Kummer, Coventry won the race by four lengths over runner-up Backbone. The race was run on a track rated fast in a final time of 1:59 0/0.

== Payout ==
The 51st Preakness Stakes Payout Schedule

Program Number	Horse Name	Win	Place	Show
11	Coventry	$45.60	$10.40	$10.90
1	Backbone	-	$3.60	$3.00
7	Almadel			$10.90

== The full chart ==
Daily Racing Form charts:

Finish Position	Margin (length)	Post Position	Horse name	Jockey	Trainer	Owner	Post Time Odds	Earnings
1st	0	8	Coventry	Clarence Kummer	William B. Duke	Gifford A. Cochran	21.80-1 †	$52,700
2nd	4	1	Backbone	Linus McAtee	James G. Rowe Jr.	Harry Payne Whitney	1.65-1 Ŧ	$5,000
3rd	1/2	9	Almadel	Lawrence McDermott	Will Buford	Hal Price Headley	†	$3,000
4th	10	6	Chantey	Ivan H. Parke	James G. Rowe Jr.	Greentree Stable	Ŧ	$2,000
5th	HD	12	By Hisself	Chick Lang	Robert A. Smith	Walter M. Jeffords Sr.	38.10-1	
6th	2	7	Gold Stick	John Callahan	Tom Moran	Archibald Barklie	73.70-1	
7th	1	2	Edisto	Bert Kennedy	William Bateman	Seagram Stable	†	
8th	2	3	Voltaic	Frank Coltiletti	George M. Odom	Robert L. Gerry Sr.	15.65-1	
9th	1	5	Single Foot	Albert Johnson	Harry Rites	J. Edwin Griffith	3.90-1	
10th	1/2	11	Prince of Bourbon	Andy Schuttinger	Roy Waldron	Xalapa Farm (Edward F. Simms)	10.65-1	
11th	3	10	Maid at Arms	John Maiben	Gwyn R. Tompkins	Glen Riddle Farm	5.35-1	
12th	10	4	Swope	Earl Sande	Albert B. Gordon	Bud Fisher	10.35-1	

- † & Ŧ - coupled
- Winning Breeder: Edward F. Simms; (KY)
- Times: 1/4 mile – 0:23 2/5; 1/2 mile – 47 3/5; 3/4 mile – 1:12 3/5; mile – 1:38 4/5; 1 3/16 (final) – 1:59 0/0
- Track Condition: Fast
