= Bold Venture (horse) =

American-bred Thoroughbred racehorse

- Sire: St Germans
- Grandsire: Swynford
- Dam: Possible
- Damsire: Ultimus
- Sex: Stallion
- Foaled: 1933
- Country: United States
- Colour: Chestnut
- Breeder: Morton L. Schwartz
- Owner: Morton L. Schwartz; King Ranch (at stud)
- Trainer: Max Hirsch
- Record: 11: 6 – 2 – 0
- Earnings: $68,300

Major wins
- Triple Crown wins: Kentucky Derby (1936); Preakness Stakes (1936)

Honours
- Bold Venture Stakes at Woodbine Racetrack
- Last updated on November 6, 2008

Bold Venture (March 4, 1933 – March 22, 1958) was an American Thoroughbred racehorse that won the Kentucky Derby and Preakness Stakes.

== Background ==
Bold Venture was bred by Robert J. Kleberg III and sired by St Germans, a multiple British stakes winner and second-place finisher in the 1924 English Derby. After his importation to stand at Greentree Stud in Lexington, Kentucky, St Germans became the leading sire of 1931, when his son Twenty Grand won the Kentucky Derby and Belmont Stakes. St Germans' own sire, Swynford, also a stakes winner, was a top British stallion whose other sons included 1924 English Derby winner Sansovino (who thus defeated his half-brother St Germans), Challenger (also imported to the United States, where he sired American Horse of the Year Challedon), Lancegaye (imported to the U.S. and sire of Kentucky Derby winner Cavalcade, and Blandford, a leading sire in Europe and the sire of four English Derby winners. Bold Venture's dam, Possible, was by Ultimus, a son of Commando.

== Racing career ==
Bold Venture, trained by Hall of Fame conditioner Max Hirsch, was entered in the 1936 Kentucky Derby without achieving a single stakes win. His rider was apprentice jockey Ira "Babe" Hanford, who had been riding in races for less than a year. Hanford's contract was owned by Hirsch's daughter, Mary, also a trainer. Just as Hanford's mount had never won a stakes race, no apprentice had ever won the Derby. Bold Venture was held at 20-1 odds in the Derby.

That year, Brevity, owned by Joseph E. Widener of Elmendorf Farm, was the favorite. Brevity had won the Florida Derby and had equaled the world record for 1 1/8 miles. Indian Broom, owned by Austin C. Taylor, was second favorite after lowering Brevity's record in the Marchbank Handicap.

As soon as the gates opened, Brevity was knocked to his knees, and the horse who would go on to win that year's American Horse of the Year award, Granville, threw his rider, James Stout. Indian Broom was trapped in a scrum of racing horses. Bold Venture was in no better position. On the way out of the gate, another horse slammed into him, which was like, Hanford said: "...a bowling ball hitting the pins." This started a chain reaction that caused Granville to throw Stout. But Bold Venture then found running room and by the backstretch had taken the lead. Then Brevity broke free of the pack and came charging after Bold Venture. However, Bold Venture crossed the finish line first.

The win did little for Bold Venture's reputation. Aside from the mess at the start, Charles Kurtsinger, the rider of the Santa Anita Derby winner He Did, claimed someone leaned over the rail and snatched his whip, causing his horse to come in seventh.

Two weeks later, Bold Venture was entered in the $50,000 Preakness Stakes. This time ridden by George Woolf, he had a second bad start but still won, beating Granville by a nose.

Undefeated in his three-year-old season, and with two legs of the Triple Crown won, Bold Venture bowed a tendon and was retired.

== Stud record and death ==
Owner Morton L. Schwartz sold Bold Venture to Robert J. Kleberg Jr. for a reported $40,000 as a breeding animal. Although Bold Venture did not have immediate success as a stallion in Kentucky, he then stood at Kleberg's King Ranch in Texas, and there sired a pair of top-class racehorses: Assault, the 1946 U.S. Triple Crown champion, and Middleground, winner of the 1950 Kentucky Derby and Belmont Stakes.

Bold Venture died in 1958 at age twenty-five.

== Sire line tree ==
- Bold Venture
  - Depth Charge
    - Johnny Dial
    - Brigand
    - Chudej's Black Gold
    - Dividend
    - Super Charge
    - Free Stride
    - The Haymaker
    - Tiny Charger
  - Assault
  - Middleground
  - Postillion
  - Nip And Tuck

== Breeding ==
Pedigree of Bold Venture
Sire St Germans bay 1921	Swynford brown 1907	John O'Gaunt	Isinglass
Sire St Germans bay 1921	Swynford brown 1907	John O'Gaunt	La Fleche
Sire St Germans bay 1921	Swynford brown 1907	Canterbury Pilgrim	Tristan
Sire St Germans bay 1921	Swynford brown 1907	Canterbury Pilgrim	Pilgrimage
Sire St Germans bay 1921	Hamoaze bay 1911	Torpoint	Trenton
Sire St Germans bay 1921	Hamoaze bay 1911	Torpoint	Doncaster Beauty
Sire St Germans bay 1921	Hamoaze bay 1911	Maid of the Mist	Cyllene
Sire St Germans bay 1921	Hamoaze bay 1911	Maid of the Mist	Sceptre
Dam Possible ch. 1920	Ultimus ch. 1906	Commando	Domino*
Dam Possible ch. 1920	Ultimus ch. 1906	Commando	Emma C
Dam Possible ch. 1920	Ultimus ch. 1906	Running Stream	Domino*
Dam Possible ch. 1920	Ultimus ch. 1906	Running Stream	Dancing Water
Dam Possible ch. 1920	Lida Flush ch. 1910	Royal Flush	Favo
Dam Possible ch. 1920	Lida Flush ch. 1910	Royal Flush	Flush
Dam Possible ch. 1920	Lida Flush ch. 1910	Lida H	Lisbon
Dam Possible ch. 1920	Lida Flush ch. 1910	Lida H	Luella

* Bold Venture is inbred 4D x 4D to the stallion Domino, meaning that he appears fourth generation twice on the dam side of his pedigree.
