= Milky Way Farm =

Former estate of Franklin C. Mars

- U.S. National Register of Historic Places
- U.S. Historic district
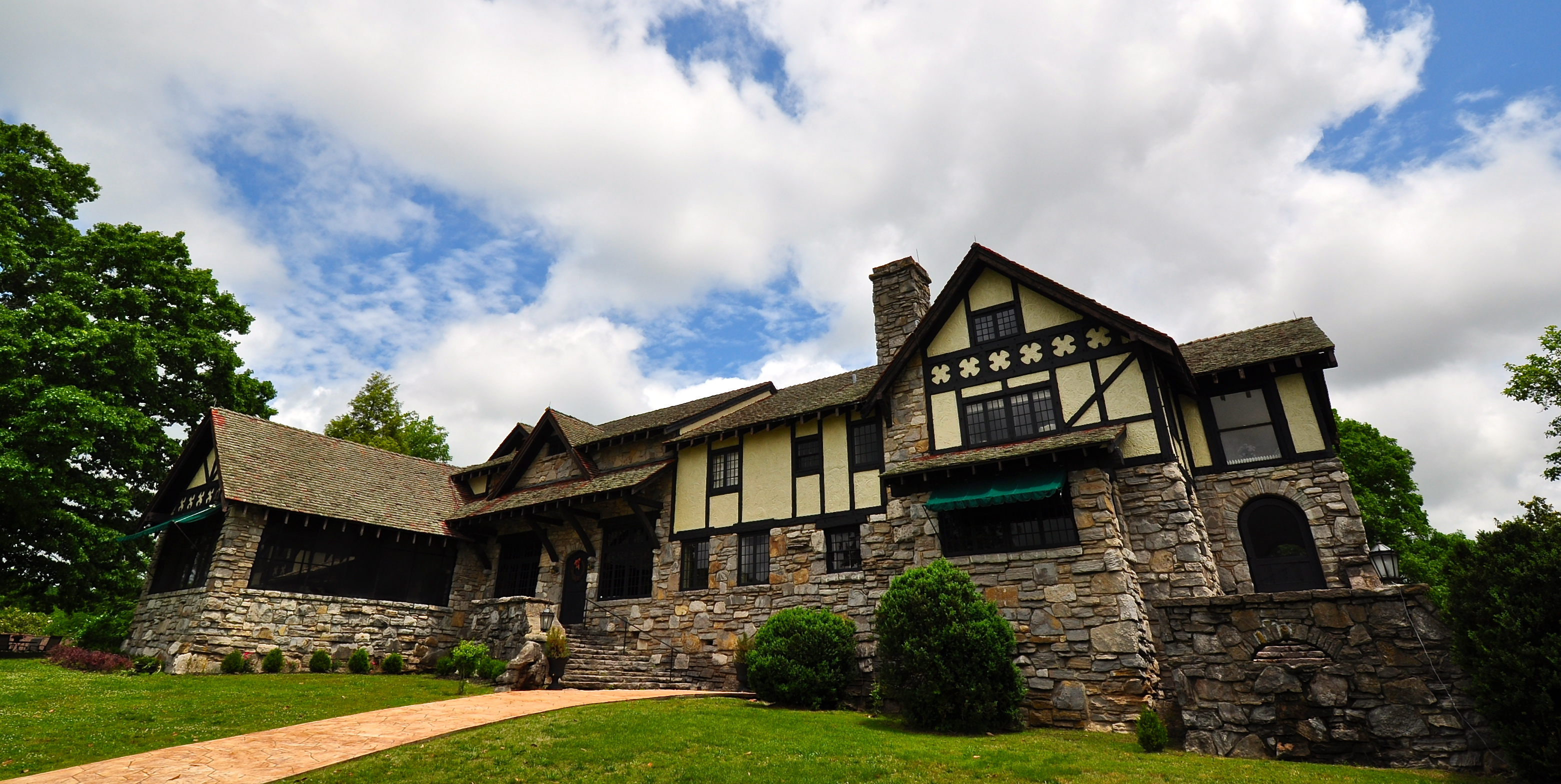
- Milky Way Farm Manor House, May 2014.

- Location within Tennessee Location within the United States
- Nearest city: Pulaski, Tennessee
- Coordinates: 35°18′37″N 87°2′15″W
- Area: 1,130 acres (460 ha)
- Built: 1931
- Architect: James F. Drake
- Architectural style: Tudor Revival
- NRHP reference No.: 84003537
- Added to NRHP: September 27, 1984

Milky Way Farm in Giles County, Tennessee, is the former estate of Franklin C. Mars, founder of Mars Candies. The property is named for the company's Milky Way candy bar. During the Great Depression, the estate was the largest employer in Giles county. The estate is listed on the National Register of Historic Places as an historic district; the farm and manor house are now used for weddings, tours, trail runs, & special events.

== History ==
Franklin Mars and his second wife, Ethel V. Mars, purchased the 2,800-acre (11 km^{2}) property in 1930, shortly after establishing a southern office of Mars Candies in Nashville. Architect James F. Drake was hired to design the Tudor Revival manor house and farm facilities for breeding Thoroughbred horses and Hereford cattle. Construction peaked between 1931 and 1933. With 800 workers during construction, Milky Way Farm became the largest employer in Giles County. During construction, many of the workers lived on the farm with their families. Mars is reputed to have been generous to his workers, who received free candy bars, as well as small loans and other forms of assistance.

Mars died in 1934, too soon to see the success of the farming operations. He was buried in a mausoleum on Milky Way Farm. His widow, Ethel Mars, oversaw the planned livestock operations. Milky Way Farm produced prize-winning Hereford cattle and thoroughbred horses that were winners on the racetrack, beginning with the farm's first racing season in 1934. Winnings in 1936 totaled $206,450, making the Milky Way Farm stable the season's most successful owner on the U.S. thoroughbred racing circuit. In 1940, Milky Way Farm's Gallahadion won the Kentucky Derby.

In March 1945, when Ethel Mars was in declining health (she died in December 1945), the farm was sold. In the subsequent decades it fell into disrepair until new owners stepped in to save the historic property.

== Description ==
The 25,000-square-foot (2,300 m^{2}) Tudor Revival manor house has 35 rooms, including 21 bedrooms, and 12 original bathrooms. The house was designed for entertaining, and many of the individual rooms are unusually large. The living room features exposed beams and a 40-foot (12 m) ceiling. The Mars' dining room table is reputed to have been the largest private dining table in Tennessee. The house was surrounded by landscaped grounds, including magnolia trees, and had an outdoor swimming pool and tennis courts.

Outbuildings included 70 cottages, 30 barns, and a horse-racing track. Local limestone was used in most of the farm buildings, which have been described as having Spanish-inspired architecture. In Ethel Mars' day, the property had 35 miles (56 km) of fences and 20 miles (32 km) of roads. Outbuildings that were still intact as of 2007 included the grounds keeper's cottage; several of the barns, including an octagonal barn; stables; and well houses. Although Franklin Mars' remains were later interred in a Minnesota cemetery, his mausoleum at Milky Way Farm still stands.

Milky Way Farm was listed on the National Register of Historic Places on September 27, 1984. It was described as significant for its role in sustaining the local economy during the Great Depression, its association with Franklin Mars, and its architecture.

== Milky Way Farm today ==
In 2007 the property was sold for a reported price of $10 million. The buyer announced plans for a $400 million development of a luxury residential community to consist of 750 to 900 homes, an equestrian club including a horse track and polo field, a golf course, and equestrian trails. However, the property went into foreclosure in May 2009.

Beginning in 2010, Milky Way Farm was purchased in sections by a father and daughter until over 1100 acres of the original property were reconstituted. With the assistance of the Tennessee Land Trust, the front acreage was placed in permanent agricultural easement, and slowly improvements began to once again protect the property. The historic manor house, barns, roofs, roads, and stone walls each received attention. In 2017, the reins were passed to the daughter and her sister to continue to care for this Tennessee landmark. Revenue from events, tours, weddings, corporate meetings, trail runs, farming, guided hunts, and seasonal festivals help contribute to operation and restoration. It has been home to events such as the Warrior Dash, Tough Mudder, Green Beret Challenge, and the Spartan Race. Current renovation projects include improvements to the show barn, manor house, roads, and the historic race track.
