= Coventry (horse) =

American-bred Thoroughbred racehorse

- Sire: Negofol
- Grandsire: Childwick
- Dam: Sun Queen
- Damsire: Rock Sand
- Sex: Stallion
- Foaled: 1922
- Country: United States
- Colour: Black
- Breeder: Edward F. Simms
- Owner: Gifford A. Cochran
- Trainer: William B. Duke
- Record: 5: 1-1-0
- Earnings: $52,825

Major wins
- Triple Crown Race wins: Preakness Stakes (1925)

Coventry (foaled 1922 in Kentucky) was an American Thoroughbred racehorse best known for winning the 1925 edition of the Preakness Stakes.

== Background ==
Coventry was bred by Edward Simms, the owner of Xalapa Farm in Paris, Kentucky, who had purchased a half interest in his sire Negofol from Louis Jean Decazes.

Consigned to the 1923 yearling auction, Coventry was sold for $25,000 to New York carpet manufacturer Gifford A. Cochran. In 1925, Coventry's training was handled by future U.S. Hall of Fame member Bill Duke, who knew the colt's breeding, having returned from France that year where he had been training Thoroughbreds since 1888. Duke had trained Coventry's sire, Negofol, for Willie Vanderbilt's racing stable and had won important races with him, including the French Derby. Back home in the United States, in 1925 Duke also trained Coventry's stable mate, a colt owned by Gifford Cochran named Flying Ebony whose ability to run extremely well on muddy racetracks resulted in his winning of the May 16 rain-soaked Kentucky Derby.

== Racing career ==
Coventry made just five lifetime starts, winning once. The one win came in the 1925 Preakness Stakes. Ridden by Clarence Kummer, the colt went off at the longest odds of any Preakness winner in history, paying backers $45.60 for a $2 wager. That record stood for exactly fifty years until Master Derby in 1975 paid $48.80. In his next race, the Withers Stakes at New York's Aqueduct Racetrack, Coventry broke down and was retired to stud.

== Stud record ==
He had very limited success as a sire. Hand To Hand and Durango were his best runners, each winning a number of minor races.

== Breeding ==
Pedigree of Coventry
Sire Negofol bay 1906	Childwick brown 1890	St Simon*	Galopin
Sire Negofol bay 1906	Childwick brown 1890	St Simon*	St Angela
Sire Negofol bay 1906	Childwick brown 1890	Plaisanterie	Wellingtonia*
Sire Negofol bay 1906	Childwick brown 1890	Plaisanterie	Poetess
Sire Negofol bay 1906	Nebrouze ch. 1899	Hoche	Robert the Devil
Sire Negofol bay 1906	Nebrouze ch. 1899	Hoche	Hermita
Sire Negofol bay 1906	Nebrouze ch. 1899	Nebuleuse	Manoel*
Sire Negofol bay 1906	Nebrouze ch. 1899	Nebuleuse	Navarre
Dam Sun Queen black 1909	Rock Sand brown 1900	Sainfoin	Springfield
Dam Sun Queen black 1909	Rock Sand brown 1900	Sainfoin	Sanda
Dam Sun Queen black 1909	Rock Sand brown 1900	Roquebrune	St Simon*
Dam Sun Queen black 1909	Rock Sand brown 1900	Roquebrune	St. Marguerite
Dam Sun Queen black 1909	Souriante bay 1896	Rayon d'Or	Flageolet*
Dam Sun Queen black 1909	Souriante bay 1896	Rayon d'Or	Araucaria*
Dam Sun Queen black 1909	Souriante bay 1896	Soubrette	Alarm
Dam Sun Queen black 1909	Souriante bay 1896	Soubrette	Susan Beane

* Coventry is inbred 3S x 4D to the stallion St Simon, meaning that he appears third generation on the sire side of his pedigree and fourth generation on the dam side of his pedigree.

* Coventry is inbred 5S x 4D to the stallion Flageolet, meaning that he appears fifth generation (via Manoel) on the sire side of his pedigree and fourth generation on the dam side of his pedigree.

* Coventry is inbred 5S x 4D to the mare Araucaria, meaning that she appears fifth generation (via Wellingtonia) on the sire side of his pedigree and fourth generation on the dam side of his pedigree.
