= Lester Balaski =

American jockey

Personal information
- Born: June 21, 1915 New Orleans, Louisiana, USA
- Died: September 1, 1964 (aged 49) San Diego, California
- Resting place: Live Oak Memorial Park, Monrovia, California
- Occupation: Jockey

Horse racing career
- Sport: Horse racing
- Career wins: 1,549

Major racing wins
- Texas Derby (1934, 1935); Cumberland Handicap (1935); Latonia Inaugural Handicap (1935); Mardi Gras Stakes (1935); American Derby (1937); Acorn Stakes (1937); Bay Shore Handicap (1937); Coaching Club American Oaks (1937); Edgemere Handicap (1937); Junior Champion Stakes (1937); Jerome Handicap (1937); Saratoga Cup (1937); Santa Catalina Cal-Bred Championship Stakes (1938); Santa Margarita Handicap (1938); Premiere Handicap (1939); Haggin Stakes (1940, 1941); Inglewood Handicap (1940); San Pasqual Handicap (1940); Del Mar Handicap (1941); Santa Barbara Handicap (1941); Arlington Futurity (1942); Washington Park Futurity Stakes (1942); Hollywood Lassie Stakes (1946); San Mateo Handicap (1946); Starlet Stakes (1946); Hollywood Oaks (1947); Bing Crosby Handicap (1947); La Jolla Handicap (1947) U.S. Triple Crown top placings: Kentucky Derby 2nd (1935); Preakness Stakes 2nd (1940)

Racing awards
- Churchill Downs Champion Jockey (1934 (Spring)

Significant horses
- Dawn Play, Mioland, Roman Soldier, Can't Wait, Count Arthur, Occupation

Lester Anthony Balaski (June 21, 1915 – September 1, 1964) was an American Thoroughbred horse racing jockey, a soldier who served his country during World War II, and a founding director and a First Vice-President of the Jockeys' Guild who died as a result of injuries suffered in an August 22, 1964, racing accident at Agua Caliente Racetrack in Mexico. A resident of Chula Vista, California, he had been transported from the racetrack to Mercy Hospital in San Diego, California where he died ten days later.

== Riding career ==
=== Triple Crown series ===
Balaski began riding professionally in 1933 and just one year later won the Churchill Downs Spring 1934 riding title. In 1935, Balaski's abilities would see him competing in the Kentucky Derby. After he won the 1935 Texas Derby with Roman Soldier, the colt had different riders for his next starts but trainer and part owner Phil Reuter chose Balaski to ride in the big event at Churchill Downs. Sent off as the third choice in the betting, Balaski and Roman Soldier finished a good second to Omaha who would go on to win the U.S. Triple Crown that year. In the 1936 Kentucky Derby, Balaski rode Edward R. Bradley's 15 to 1 outsider Bien Joli to a fifth-place finish and in the 1938 running was third aboard Can't Wait. His fourth-place in the 1940 Kentucky Derby would be the last Derby ride for Balaski as a result of service with the United States Army during World War II. In 1940 he had his first and only ride in the second leg of the U. S. Triple Crown series, the Preakness Stakes. Aboard Mioland he had been fourth to Gallahadion in the 1940 Derby and would be runner-up to Bimelech in the 1940 Preakness Stakes.

=== Other racing successes ===
Riding for future U. S. Racing Hall of Fame trainer Max Hirsch, among several stakes race wins in 1937, on the filly Dawn Play Balaski won three major races, each of which attracted some of the very best horses from all over the country. They captured the American Derby at Chicago's Washington Park Race Track where Dawn Play beat her male counterparts, and both the Acorn Stakes and the Coaching Club American Oaks at Belmont Park for fillies. Balaski's handling of Dawn Play was key to her being voted the 1937 American Champion Three-Year-Old Filly.

By 1938 Balaski had relocated to a permanent base in California where he won numerous important stakes races at Hollywood Park Racetrack and Santa Anita Park. Noteworthy is when he travelled to Chicago in 1942 where he won two important stakes for juveniles, the Arlington Futurity and the Washington Park Futurity Stakes aboard Occupation.

When Balaski returned to racing after the War, he continued to win important races. In 1946 he rode U Time for owner Rex Ellsworth and his future Hall of Fame trainer Mesh Tenney to win an important race for two-year-old fillies, the Starlet Stakes and the following year rode U Time to victory in a top West Coast race for three-year-old fillies, the Hollywood Oaks.

After twenty plus years in the saddle, in 1955 Balaski retired from riding and for the next four years worked as a trainer. However, he returned to riding on a limited basis in 1959, at first accepting only mounts on two-year-olds, often still green horses with which he had always had a great deal of success. He soon dropped that particular self-imposed restriction but still limited the number of racecards in which he participated. A story in the July 6, 1959 Los Angeles Times reported that "In a continuation of the spectacular performances which have marked his comeback Jockey Lester Balaski a veteran of 26 years on the turf rode four winners".

Balaski had been riding weekends at Agua Caliente Racetrack when he was injured in a racing accident on August 22, 1964, that led to his death ten days later.

== Personal life ==
Balaski left behind a widow and three children from former marriages. His daughter Belinda is an actress.
