= Ira Hanford =

American jockey

Personal information
- Born: February 24, 1918 Fairbury, Nebraska
- Died: November 21, 2009 (aged 91) Ocala, Florida
- Occupation: Jockey

Horse racing career
- Sport: Horse racing

Major racing wins
- As a jockey: Bay Shore Handicap (1936); East View Stakes (1936); Jerome Handicap (1936); Stars and Stripes Handicap (1938); Bahamas Stakes (1939, 1953); Flamingo Stakes (1939); Tropical Handicap (1939); Exterminator Handicap (1946); Delaware Handicap (1948); Gallorette Handicap (1952); Monmouth Oaks (1952); Comely Stakes (1953); Hibiscus Stakes (1953); Ladies Handicap (1953) U.S. Triple Crown wins: Kentucky Derby (1936); As a trainer: Lawrence Realization Stakes (1965); Rancocas Stakes (1965); Jersey Derby (1966); Gallant Fox Handicap (1966); Long Island Handicap (1967); Manhattan Handicap (1967); Lamplighter Stakes (1972)

Significant horses
- Bold Venture, La Corredora, Miss Grillo, Seabiscuit

Ira G. "Babe" Hanford (February 24, 1918 – November 21, 2009) was an American jockey. He rode the winning horse in the 1936 Kentucky Derby.

== Biography ==
He was born in Fairbury, Nebraska, and was Jewish. Hanford became involved in racing after being given his first mount in 1935 by Mary Hirsch.

He rode the winning horse Bold Venture in the 1936 Kentucky Derby. The colt he rode while still an apprentice was owned and bred by Morton L. Schwartz and trained by Hall of Fame inductee, Max Hirsch.

His career was interrupted by four years of service with the United States Army during World War II.

Ira Hanford died of cancer on November 21, 2009, in Ocala, Florida at age 91. He was the brother of Kelso's Hall of Fame trainer, Carl Hanford.
