= Jockeys' Guild =

- Jockeys' Guild
- Founded: 1940; 86 years ago
- Headquarters: Lexington, Kentucky
- Location: United States
- Key people: John Velazquez, Chairman; G. R. Carter, Vice Chairman; Jon Court, Secretary
- Website: www.jockeysguild.com

The Jockeys' Guild Inc. is an American trade association based in Lexington, Kentucky, representing thoroughbred horse racing and American quarter horse professional jockeys. The organization filed for Chapter 11 protection from creditors in bankruptcy court in Louisville, Kentucky, on October 12, 2007.

Established in 1940, the organization's founding members consisted of many of the leading jockeys of the day including Eddie Arcaro, Carroll Bierman, Charley Kurtsinger, Johnny Longden, Don Meade, Maurice Peters, Red Pollard, Sam Renick, Harry Richards, Alfred Robertson, and Ray Workman.

The Jockeys' Guild founding board was made up of:

- Harry Richards - President
- Lester Balaski - 1st Vice President
- Eddie Arcaro - 2nd Vice President
- Raymond Workman - 3rd Vice President
- Irving Anderson - Treasurer

On February 24, 2001, the Thoroughbred Times published an article captioned 'A debt of remembrance', that told the story of the important work by jockey Tommy Luther, that led to the Guild's creation. The story recounted the influence on Luther, when he was part of the horrific circumstances North American jockeys lived under at the time; fellow jockey Earl "Sandy" Graham was killed while racing at Polo Park Racetrack in Winnipeg, Manitoba in September 1927.

== Presidents ==
- Harry Richards: 1940–1943
- Sterling Young: 1943–1949
- Eddie Arcaro: 1949–1962
- Sam Boulmetis: 1962–1967
- William Boland: 1967–1969
- Walter Blum: 1969–1975
- Mike Venezia: 1975–1981
- Bill Shoemaker: 1981–1989
- Jerry D. Bailey: 1989–1996
- Gary Stevens: 1996–2000
- Pat Day: 2000–2001
- Tomey Jean Swan: 2001 (Acting)
- L. Wayne Gertmenian: 2001–2005
- Darrell Haire: 2005-2006 (Acting)
- Dwight Manley: 2006–2007
- John R. Velazquez: 2007–present
