= Elmer Berger =

Elmer Berger may refer to:

- Elmer Berger (inventor) (1891–1952), American inventor of the rear-view mirror
- Elmer Berger (rabbi) (1908–1996), Jewish Reform rabbi known for his anti-Zionism
