= Franklin Clarence Mars =

American businessman (1883–1934)

- Mars c. 1920
- Born: September 24, 1883; Pope County, Minnesota, U.S.
- Died: April 8, 1934 (aged 50); Baltimore, Maryland, U.S.
- Occupation: Businessman
- Known for: Founder of Mars Inc.
- Spouses: Ethel G. Kissack (m. 1902; div. 1910); Ethel Veronica Healy (m. 1910)
- Family: Mars family

Franklin Clarence Mars (/ˈmɑːrz/; September 24, 1883 – April 8, 1934) was an American business magnate who founded the food company Mars Inc., which mostly makes chocolate candy. Mars' son Forrest Mars developed M&M's and the Mars bar and founded the Ethel M Chocolate Factory.

== Family ==
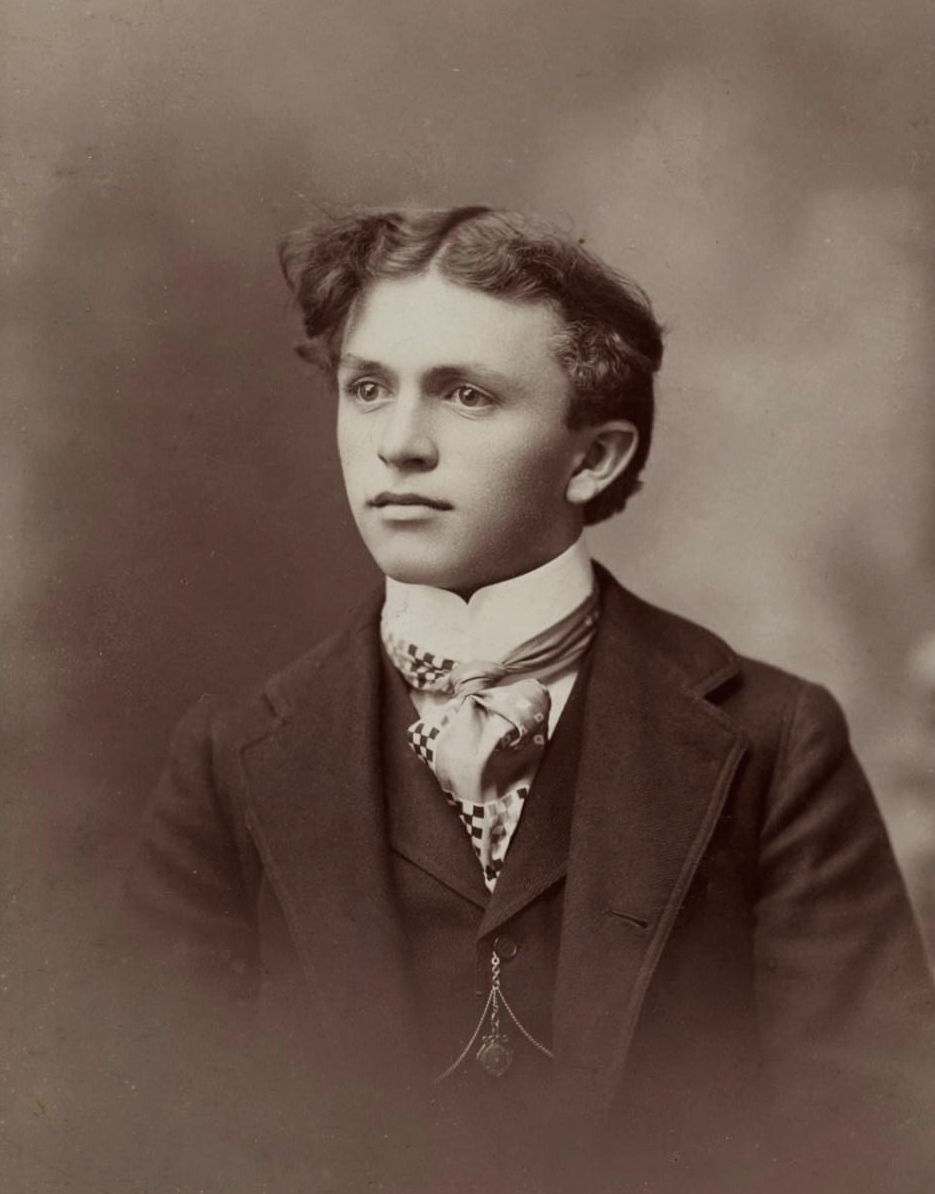
Mars c. 1899-1900

Mars was born on September 24, 1883, in Walden Township, Pope County, Minnesota. He learned how to hand-dip chocolate candy as a child from his mother Alva, who entertained him while he had a mild case of polio. He began to sell molasses chips at age 19. Mars attended high school at the Breck School, a boarding school then located in Wilder, Minnesota.

Mars and Ethel G. Kissack (1882–1980), a schoolteacher, were married in 1902 in Hennepin County, Minnesota. Their son, Forrest Mars, Sr., was born in 1904 in Wadena, Minnesota. They divorced sometime before 1910.

Mars and Ethel Veronica Healy (1884–1945) were married in 1910 and had one daughter, Patricia Mars (1914–1965).

== Mars, Incorporated ==
He started the Mars Candy Factory in 1911 with Ethel V. Mars, his second wife, in Tacoma, Washington. This factory produced and sold fresh candy wholesale, but ultimately the venture failed because there was a better established business, Brown & Haley, also known as Almond Roca, also operating in Tacoma.

In 1920, they moved to Minneapolis, Minnesota, where Mars founded Mar-O-Bar Co. and began to manufacture chocolate candy bars. The company later incorporated as Mars, Incorporated. In 1923 he introduced his son Forrest's idea, the Milky Way, which became the best-selling candy bar. Mars moved to Chicago in 1929 and settled in River Forest. He became an honorary captain of the Oak Park, Illinois police department.

In 1930, Mars developed the Snickers Bar.

== Death and legacy ==
Mars died from heart and kidney issues on April 8, 1934 at Johns Hopkins Hospital in Baltimore. Ownership of the family business passed to his son Forrest.

== Horse racing ==
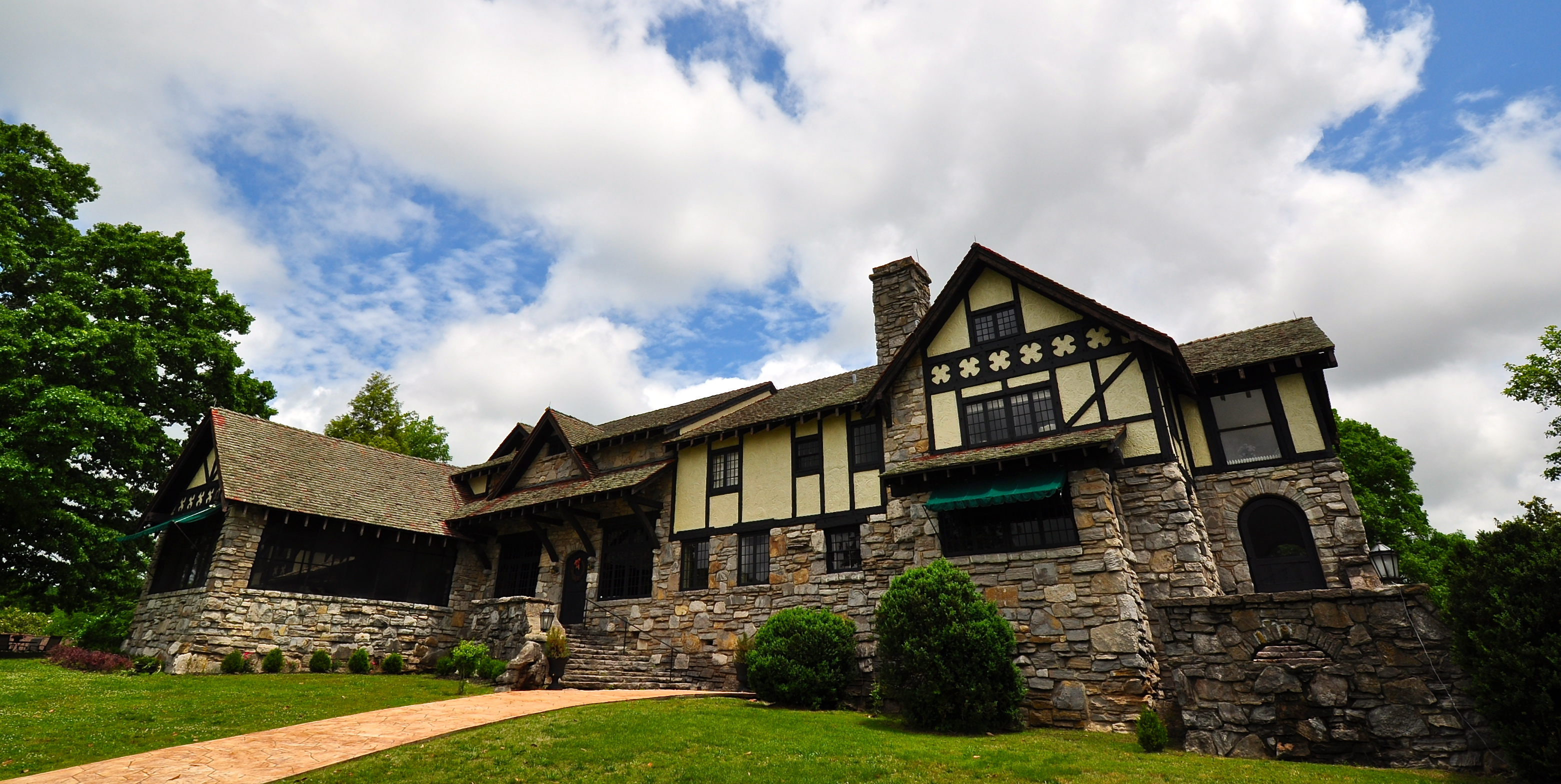
Milky Way Farm Manor House, May 2014.

In the late 1920s, in Pulaski, Tennessee, Mars bought a number of local farms and constructed a large estate called Milky Way Farm. During its construction, Mars employed more than 935 men from Giles County to build a 25,000-square-foot (2,300 m^{2}) clubhouse, more than 30 barns, and a horse racing track. Gallahadion won the Kentucky Derby in 1940 after Mars died.

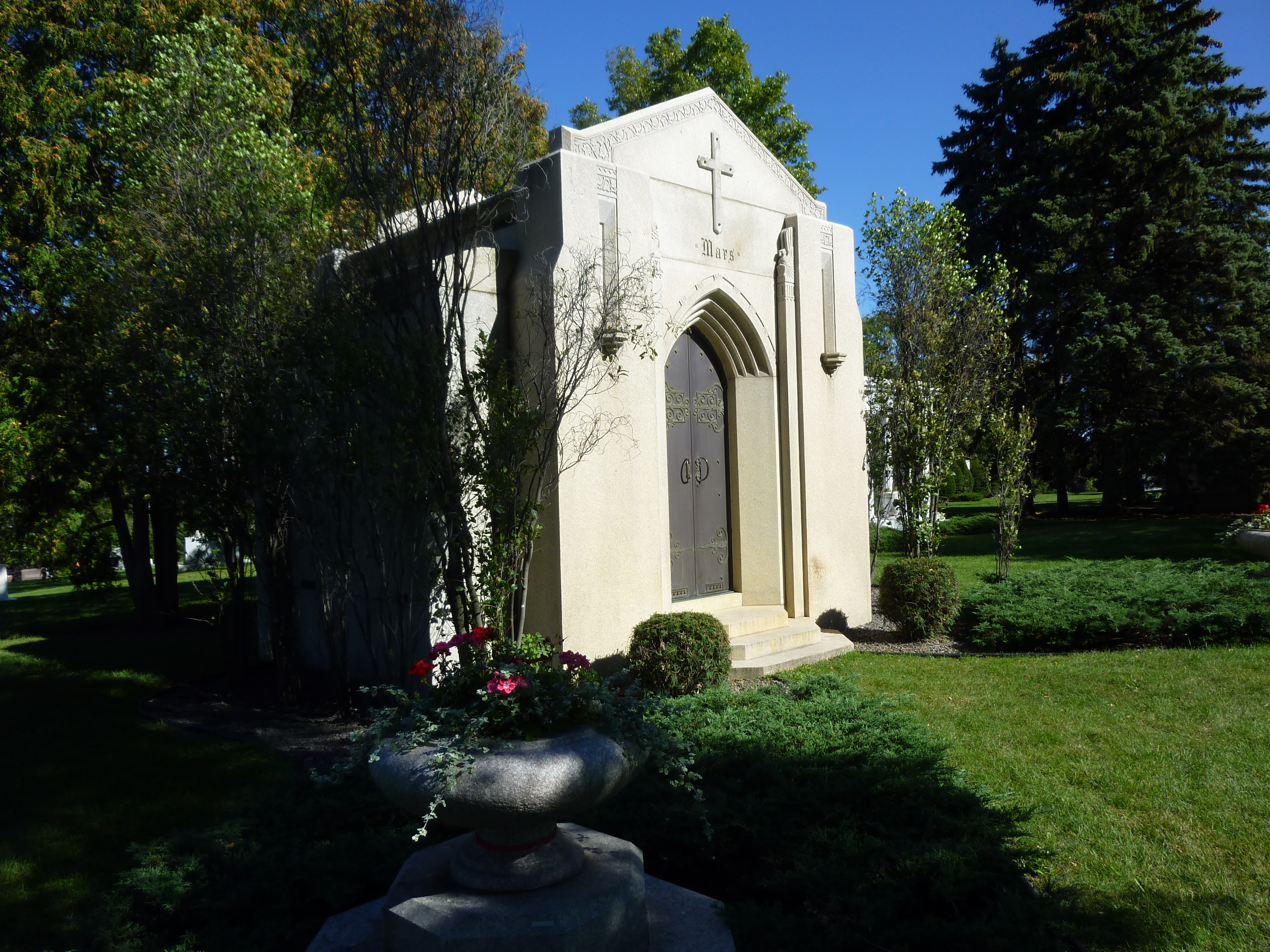
Mars private mausoleum in Lakewood Cemetery in Minneapolis

Mars lived the remainder of his life on the 2,800 acres (11 km^{2}) farm and was buried there upon his death in 1934. After Milky Way Farm was sold, the remains of Mars and his wife Ethel V. Mars were moved to a private mausoleum at Lakewood Cemetery in Minneapolis, where they are currently interred.

== See also ==
- Mars family
