= Basil James =

American jockey

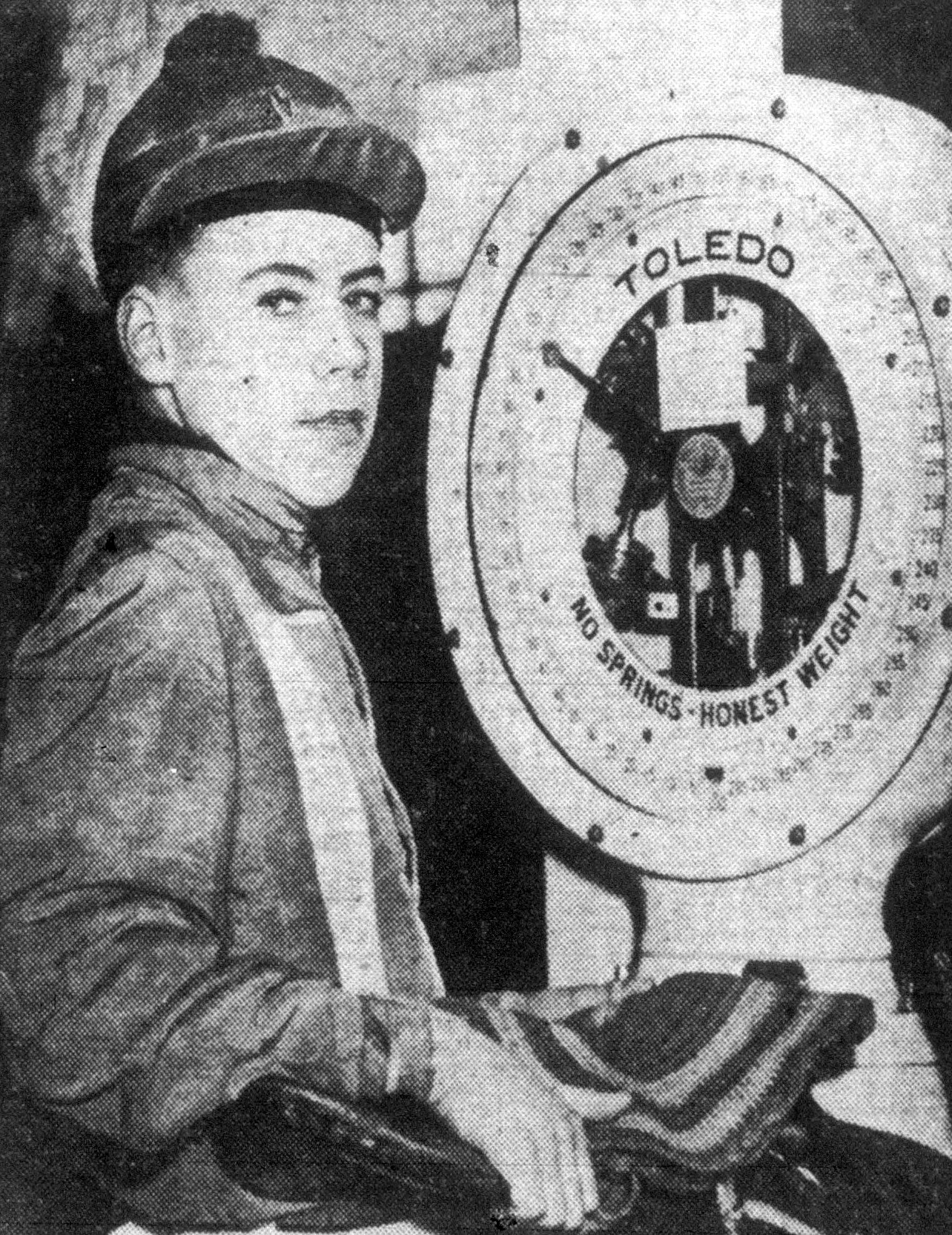
- James, circa 1942

Personal information
- Born: May 18, 1920 Loveland, Colorado
- Died: April 10, 1998 (aged 77)
- Occupation: Jockey

Horse racing career
- Sport: Horse racing
- Career wins: 1,527

Major racing wins
- Arlington Handicap (1936); Havre de Grace Cup Handicap (1937); San Pasqual Handicap (1937); Bay Shore Handicap (1938); California Breeders' Champion Stakes (1939); San Antonio Handicap (1939); Brooklyn Handicap (1939); Jockey Club Gold Cup (1939, 1941); Blue Grass Stakes (1939); Ladies Handicap (1939); Gazelle Handicap (1939, 1940); Huron Handicap (1939); Saranac Handicap (1939, 1940); Santa Maria Handicap (1939); American Legion Handicap (1940); Butler Handicap (1940); Fashion Stakes (1940); Juvenile Stakes (1940, 1949); San Vicente Stakes (1940); Youthful Stakes (1940, 1946, 1949); Ashland Stakes (1941); Carter Handicap (1941); San Felipe Stakes (1941); Wilson Stakes (1941); Palm Beach Handicap (1942); Withers Stakes (1942); Suburban Handicap (1942); Edgemere Handicap (1946); Hollywood Gold Cup (1946); Jamaica Handicap (1946); Manhattan Handicap (1946); Discovery Handicap (1946); New York Handicap (1946); Saratoga Cup (1946); Whitney Stakes (1946); Metropolitan Handicap (1947); Toboggan Handicap (1947); Lamplighter Handicap (1949); William Penn Stakes (1954); Dixie Stakes (1955) U.S. Triple Crown series: Preakness Stakes (1942)

Racing awards
- United States Champion Jockey by wins (1936); United States Champion Jockey by earnings (1939)

Honors
- Washington State Sports Hall of Fame (1967); Washington Thoroughbred Racing Hall of Fame (2005)

Significant horses
- Alsab, Cravat, Indian Broom, Fairy Chant, Gallahadion, Market Wise, Parasang, Stymie, Triplicate
- Updated on May 5, 2021

Basil B. James (May 18, 1920 – April 10, 1998) was a two-time American National Champion jockey.

== Biography ==
Born in Loveland, Colorado, Basil James became a jockey in California while in his teens and in 1936 at age sixteen he led all U.S. jockeys with 245 wins. After a successful 1937, in January 1938 he was suspended for ninety days after "grabbing Herb Litzenberger during the running of the seventh race" at Santa Anita Park. Once he served his suspension, James continued winning and in 1939 was the United States Champion Jockey by earnings.

== World Record & National Championships ==
On April 11, 1936, Basil James rode Indian Broom to a World record time for a mile and one-eighth on dirt at California's Tanforan Racetrack. In an interview several days later, James said that Indian Broom could have gone even faster as he had "never made a move" with the colt. Basil James finished 1936 as the United States Champion Jockey by wins and in 1939 would be the United States Champion Jockey by earnings.

Basil James' most famous horse was the Hall of Fame colt Alsab who was voted U. S. 2-Year-Old and 3-Year Old Champion male horse. Aboard Alsab he won the 1942 Preakness Stakes setting a new race record and winning by a length ahead of the second-place finisher, but his career was interrupted later that year as a result of his World War II service with the United States Army. When he returned to racing in 1946, Basil James continued to win major stakes races on the New York State circuit. He retired from riding in 1956 but came back again in 1959 then in 1963 joined the staff at Longacres Racetrack near Seattle, Washington where he worked for the next thirty years.

Suffering from Alzheimer's disease, Basil James was living in a nursing home in Des Moines, Washington when he died in 1998.

== Recognition ==
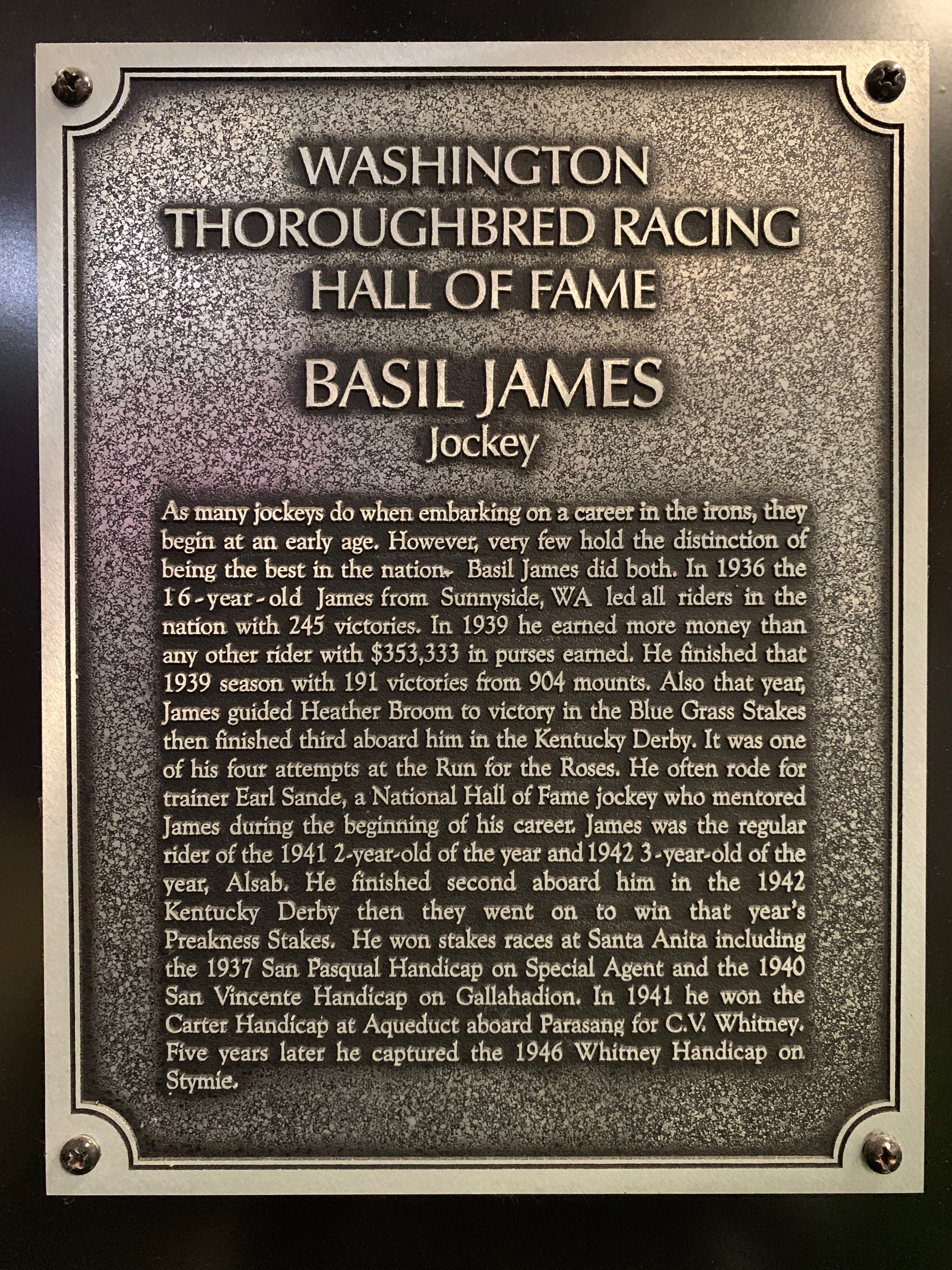
Plaque for Basil James in the Washington Racing Hall of Fame

In 1967 Basil James was inducted into the State of Washington Sports Hall of Fame for his accomplishments in the sport of horse racing.

In 2005 he was inducted into the Washington Thoroughbred Racing Hall of Fame in the jockey category.

James was inducted into the Washington Horse Racing Hall of Fame, including a plaque in his honor displayed in the Hall of Fame housed at Emerald Downs, for his performance as a jockey.

In 2019, the Times Herald-Record highlighted Basil James' win riding Alsab at the 1942 Preakness Stakes as an event of importance in the history of sports that took place on the date 9 May.
