= Dawn Play =

American-bred Thoroughbred racehorse

- Sire: Clock Tower
- Grandsire: Snob II
- Dam: Gun Play
- Damsire: Man o' War
- Sex: Stallion
- Foaled: 1934
- Country: United States
- Colour: Brown
- Breeder: Morton L. Schwartz
- Owner: King Ranch
- Trainer: Max Hirsch
- Record: 14: 4-5-0
- Earnings: US$50,800

Major wins
- American Derby (1937); Acorn Stakes (1937); Coaching Club American Oaks (1937)

Awards
- American Champion Three-Year-Old Filly (1937)

Dawn Play (1934–1944) was an American Thoroughbred Champion racehorse voted the 1937 American Champion Three-Year-Old Filly.

== Background ==
Bred by Morton L. Schwartz, the filly was sold as a yearling to Robert J. Kleberg at an August 21, 1935 Fasig-Tipton dispersal auction of Schwartz's Elsmeade Farm stud held at Saratoga Springs, New York. The Kleberg purchases that day are noteworthy as it included several quality fillies and mares plus nine other yearlings which marked the successful entry of Kleberg's King Ranch into the Thoroughbred racing and breeding business.

Trainer Max Hirsch, a future U.S. Racing Hall of Fame inductee who had been with the Schwartz stable, was hired by Robert Kleberg. It would turn out to be a highly successful racing partnership that included winning the 1946 U. S. Triple Crown and lasted until Hirsch's passing in 1969.

Bred to go a distance, Dawn Play was sired by Clock Tower, a Schwartz homebred who was the winner of three mid-level stakes races and who had won at a mile and a quarter with a good clocking of 2:02 4/5. Dawn Play's dam, whom Schwartz gifted to his Elsmeade Farm manager Cy White, was Gun Play. She was a daughter of the legendary Man o' War who was chosen number one in the Blood-Horse magazine List of the Top 100 U.S. Racehorses of the 20th Century.

== Racing career ==
Racing at age two, in New York Dawn Play won only once, capturing a five furlong race for maiden fillies at Empire City Race Track. In two important stakes races she came from far back to earn second place in the six furlong Matron Stakes at Belmont Park. In Maryland she showed she was better at longer distances and was second in the one mile Selima Stakes at Laurel Park racecourse.

Dawn Play was the only filly among the twenty horses chosen by the Daily Racing Form to be profiled in their series titled "Three-Year-Old Prospects of 1937." The Daily Racing Form concluded their article with high praise for Dawn Play, writing that "she may very well be the best of her sex in American racing this season." Their forecast would prove to be correct.

Dawn Play's 1937 campaign saw trainer Max Hirsch hire jockey Lester Balaski to ride the filly and his handling of her three big wins that year was instrumental in her being voted the American Champion Three-Year-Old Filly. Despite ankle problems that would plague her throughout 1937, at Chicago's Washington Park Race Track Balaski guided Dawn Play to victory in the prestigious mile and one-quarter American Derby in which she became just the third filly to win the race in all of its twenty-eight previous runnings. Since then, through 2018, only one other filly has won the American Derby. In New York, Balaski and Dawn Play won the Acorn Stakes at one mile, then sealed her Championship with a win in the mile and three-eighths Coaching Club American Oaks at Belmont Park.

=== An abrupt end to a brilliant career ===
While stabled at Saratoga Race Course, on July 26, 1937 lightning struck Dawn Play's barn. She was the first to be hit followed by three other horses that left them all unconscious for several hours. Willis Sharpe Kilmer's two-year-old filly Gino Vive was killed. The injury to Dawn Play spelled the end to her racing career and she was retired to broodmare service at her owner's stud farm. In a strange twist, after the lightning incident Dawn Play began to suffer from bouts of colic which would claim her life in 1944.

== Broodmare career ==
Dawn Play produced only three live offspring, all males. The first born did not live long and the other two, a 1943 colt by Equestrian and a 1944 colt by Bold Venture were unsuccessful as racehorses and at stud.

== Pedigree ==
Pedigree of Dawn Play, brown filly, 1934
Sire Clock Tower	Snob II	Prestige	Le Pompon
Sire Clock Tower	Snob II	Prestige	Orgueilleuse
Sire Clock Tower	Snob II	May Dora	Isidor
Sire Clock Tower	Snob II	May Dora	Mai
Sire Clock Tower	Daylight Saving	Star Shoot	Isinglass
Sire Clock Tower	Daylight Saving	Star Shoot	Astrology
Sire Clock Tower	Daylight Saving	Tea Enough	Ogden
Sire Clock Tower	Daylight Saving	Tea Enough	Tea's Over
Dam Gun Play	Man o' War	Fair Play	Hastings
Dam Gun Play	Man o' War	Fair Play	Fairy Gold
Dam Gun Play	Man o' War	Mahubah	Rock Sand
Dam Gun Play	Man o' War	Mahubah	Merry Token
Dam Gun Play	Scoot	Vamose	Orme
Dam Gun Play	Scoot	Vamose	Vampire
Dam Gun Play	Scoot	Squib	Speed
Dam Gun Play	Scoot	Squib	Extinct (family: 3)
