= Dwight N. Manley =

American numismatist

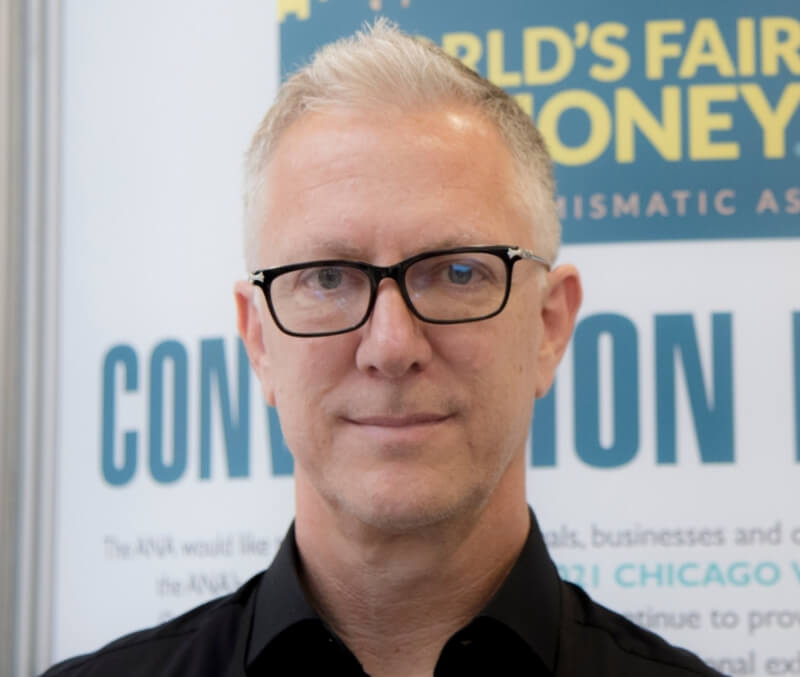
- Born: February 23, 1966 (age 60); Brea, California
- Occupations: Managing Partner of California Gold Marketing Group LLC, numismatist, professional sports agent, and real estate developer
- Employer: California Gold Marketing Group LLC

Dwight N. Manley (born February 23, 1966) is an American businessman, Managing Partner of California Gold Marketing Group LLC, numismatist, professional sports agent, and real estate developer from Brea, California.

== Early life and interest in numismatics ==
Manley's interest in numismatics began at the age of six when he received a 1909 Lincoln cent. His passion for coin collecting was further nurtured through the American Numismatic Association's (ANA) popular Summer Seminar which he attended in 1981 thanks to a scholarship he won, which was encouraged by the ANA and its governor.

== Contributions to numismatics ==
In 2001, Manley funded a multi-million-dollar renovation of the American Numismatic Association's (ANA) museum and library. The library more than doubled its shelf space and expanded its climate-controlled rare book room.

In 2007, Manley donated a copy of Illustrium Imagines, the world's first illustrated numismatic book printed in 1517, to the ANA. As Managing Partner of California Gold Marketing Group LLC, Manley undertook negotiations to buy the ship's cargo of historic California Gold Rush-era coins and gold assayers' bars

Manley funded for "A California Gold Rush History", a 1,000-page book, by selling treasures recovered from the Central America, contributing over $500,000 to research and preparation costs. This donation also included other significant Washington-related medals Manley had acquired separately totalling over 1,000 coins and medals.

In 2022, Manley donated more than 60 books, auction catalogs, and photographs that he acquired at auction from the Sydney F. Martin Numismatic Library Collection. All items were previously owned or annotated by the noted numismatic researcher and author Walter Breen (1928-1993), with many containing Breen's handwritten notes.

== Sports management and television production ==
Beyond numismatics, Manley is the president of United Sports Agency. In June 2006, he was appointed as the national manager of the Jockeys' Guild, a position he voluntarily served without compensation for a period of one year.

As a sports agent, Manley also represented all-star Karl Malone of the Utah Jazz and negotiated a $66.5 million contract for the player. Manley was also known in the sports world for his role as the agent of NBA player Dennis Rodman during the 1990s.

In addition to his roles in sports management, Manley is a television producer.
