= Rearview mirror =

Mirror in vehicles that allows the driver to see rearwards

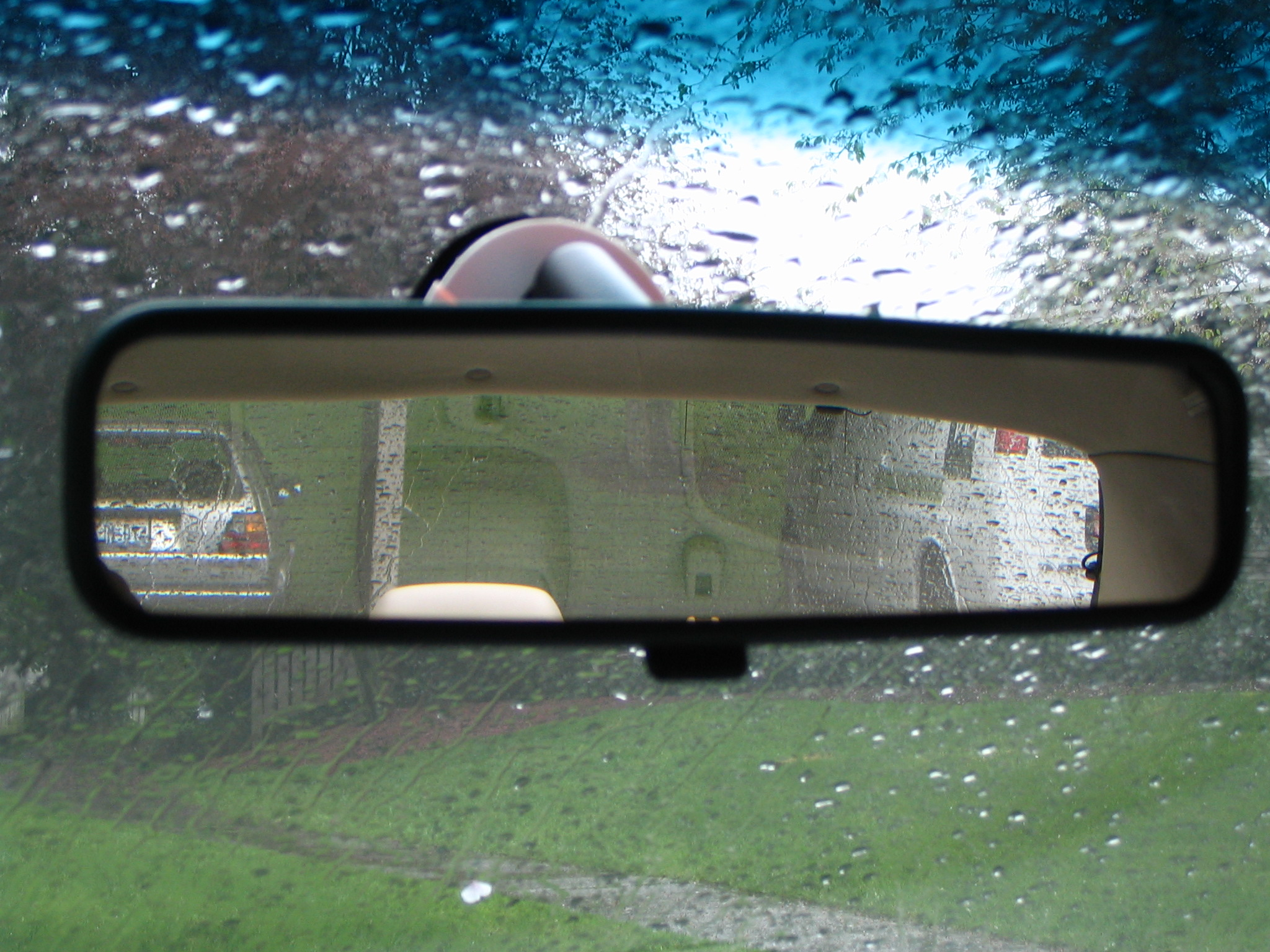
Rearview mirror showing cars parked behind the vehicle containing the mirror

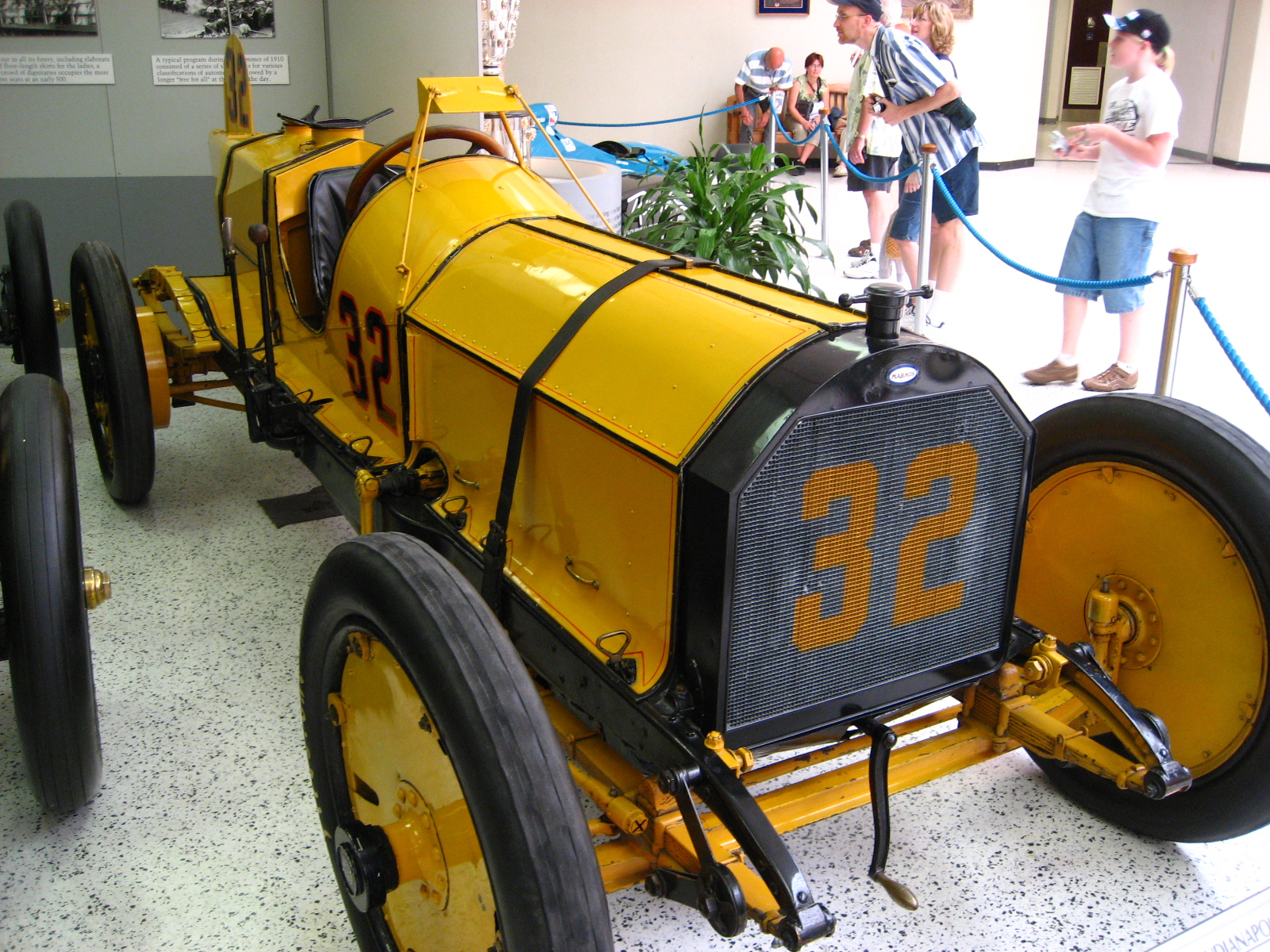
Ray Harroun's Marmon "Wasp" with its rearview mirror mounted on struts above the car on display in the Indianapolis Motor Speedway Hall of Fame Museum

A rearview mirror (or rear-view mirror) is a mirror, usually a plane mirror, in automobiles and other vehicles, designed to allow the driver to see rearward through the vehicle's rear window (rear windshield).

In cars, the rearview mirror is usually affixed to the top of the windshield on a double-swivel mount allowing it to be adjusted to suit the height and viewing angle of any driver and to swing harmlessly out of the way if impacted by a vehicle occupant in a collision.

The rearview mirror is augmented by one or more side-view mirrors, which serve as the only rear-vision mirrors on trucks, motorcycles and bicycles.

== History ==
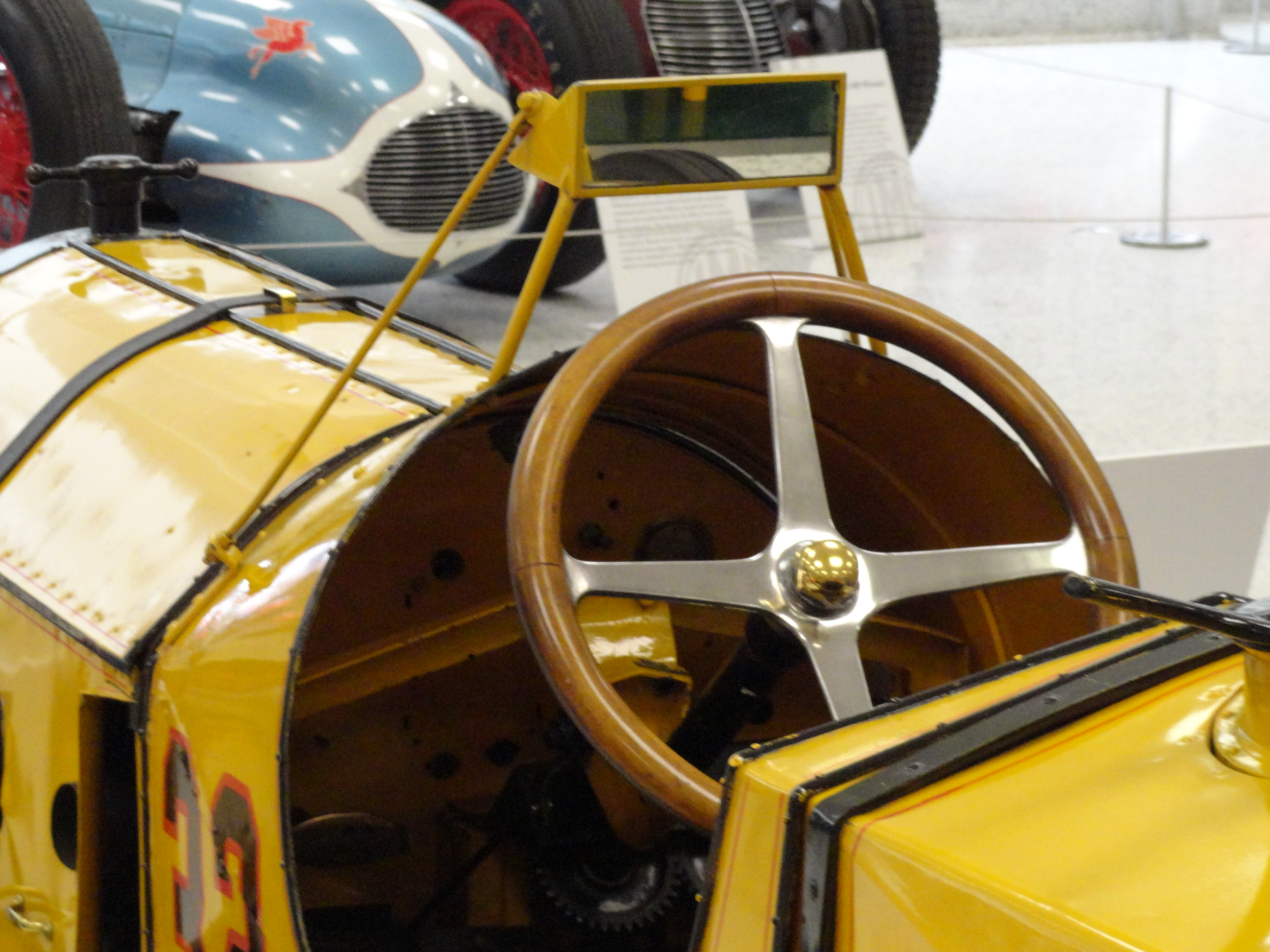
Rearview mirror of Harroun's "Wasp"

Early use of fixed mirrors was described as early as 1906, with a trade magazine noting mirrors for showing what is coming behind were now popular on closed bodied automobiles, and were likely to be widely adopted in a short time. The same year, a Mr. Bilal Ghanty from France patented a "Warning mirror for automobiles". The Argus Dash Mirror, adjustable to any position to see the road behind, appeared in 1908. Earliest known rearview mirror mounted on a racing vehicle appeared on Ray Harroun's Marmon race car at the inaugural Indianapolis 500 race in 1911. Harroun himself claimed he got the idea from seeing a mirror used for a similar purpose on a horse-drawn vehicle in 1904. Harroun also claimed that the mirror vibrated constantly due to the rough brick surface, and it was rendered largely useless.

Elmer Berger is usually credited with inventing the rearview mirror, though in fact he was the first to patent it (1921) and develop it for incorporation into production street going automobiles by his Berger and Company. He marketed his product as the Cop-Spotter, a means of avoiding being caught speeding by police.

== Augmentations and alternatives ==
Recently, rear-view video cameras have been built into many new model cars, this was partially in response to the rearview mirrors' inability to show the road directly behind the car, due to the rear deck or trunk obscuring as much as 3–5 meters (10–15 feet) of road behind the car. As many as 50 small children are killed by SUVs every year in the USA because the driver cannot see them in their rearview mirrors. Camera systems are usually mounted to the rear bumper or lower parts of the car, allowing for better rear visibility.

Aftermarket secondary rearview mirrors are available. They attach to the main rearview mirror and are independently adjustable to view the back seat. This is useful to enable adults to monitor children in the back seat.

== Anti-glare ==
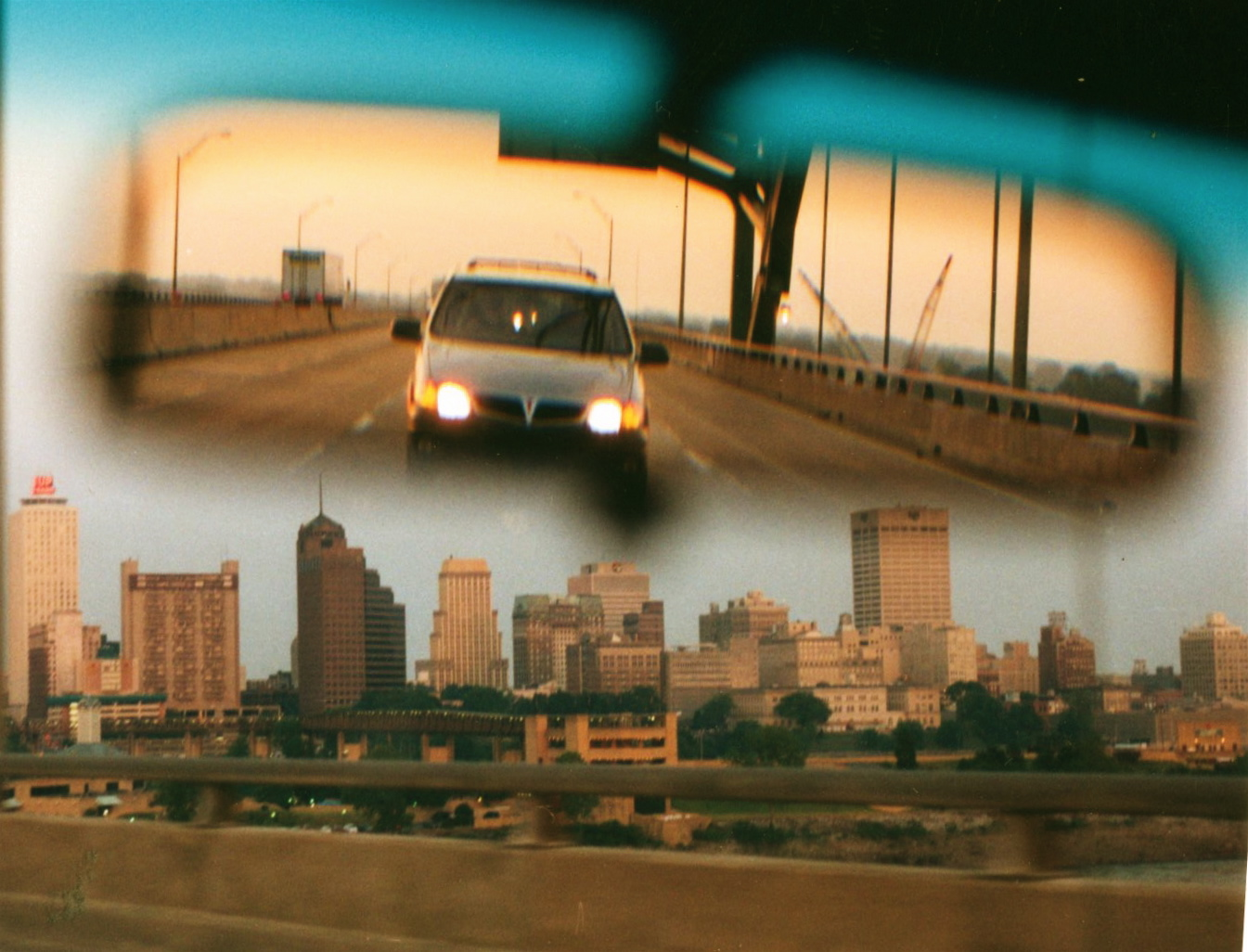
Glare from a following vehicle's headlamps in a rear view mirror

Prismatic anti-glare
- In the "day" position, the driver sees the road behind by reflection on the (rear) metal surface. In the "night" position, the driver sees the dimmer reflection on the (front) glass coating. The light is attenuated in the second mode, which partially compensates the pupillary response.

A prismatic rearview mirror—sometimes called a "day/night mirror"—can be tilted to reduce the brightness and glare of lights, mostly for high-beam headlights of vehicles behind which would otherwise be reflected directly into the driver's eyes at night. This type of mirror is made of a piece of glass that is wedge-shaped in cross-section—its front and rear surfaces are not parallel.

On manual tilt versions, a tab is used to adjust the mirror between "day" and "night" positions. In the day view position, the front surface is tilted and the reflective back side gives a strong reflection. When the mirror is moved to the night view position, its reflecting rear surface is tilted out of line with the driver's view. This view is actually a reflection of the low-reflection front surface; only a much-reduced amount of light is reflected in the driver's eyes.

"Manual tilt" day/night mirrors first began appearing in the 1930s and became standard equipment on most passenger cars and trucks by the early 1970s.

=== Automatic dimming ===
In the 1940s, American inventor Jacob Rabinow developed a light-sensitive automatic mechanism for the wedge-type day/night mirror.

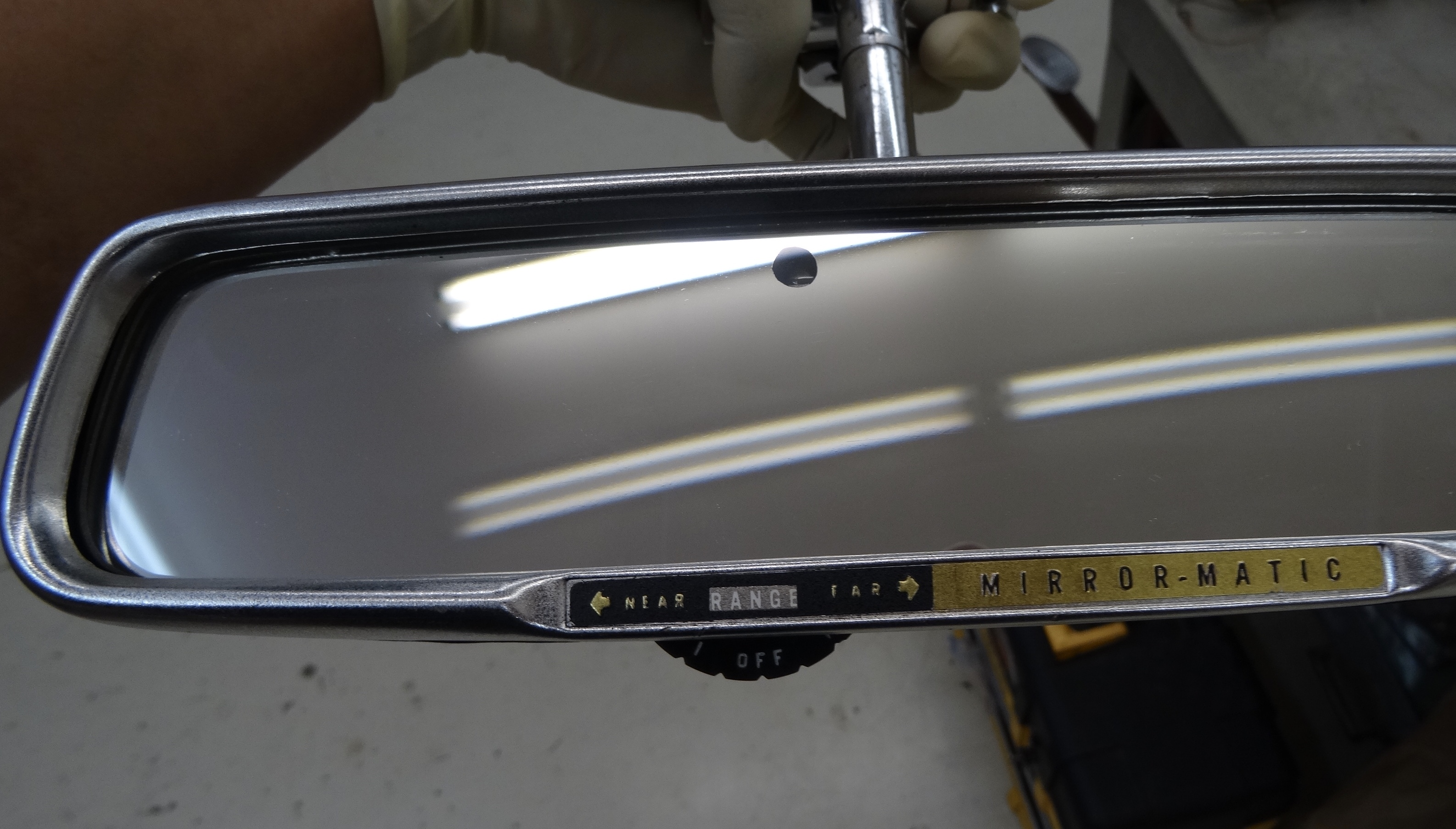
Later 1960-style Chrysler Corp Mirror-Matic electromechanical self-dimming prismatic rearview mirror for a 1960 Imperial

Chrysler Corporation offered "Mirror-Matic" as optional equipment on nearly all of its US models from 1959 through 1961. The price in the 1960 MoPar Accessories catalogue was listed as $23.25 (page 32). When the headlights were on and the Mirror-Matic sensitivity was set to anything except "Off", an electromechanical solenoid flipped the prismatic mirror between its night & day positions as needed based on the input from a single, rear-facing light sensor positioned behind a clear circle in the mirror face. For model year 1960 Mirror-Matic was improved by using an adjustable sensitivity wheel (1-10 & Off) instead of having just "Hiway", "City", & "Off" for light sensitivity settings. Because it was only offered for 4 years, it is generally believed that it did not sell well, although specific sales figures are unknown.

Several automakers began offering rearview mirrors with automatic dimming again in 1983, and it was in the late 1980s that they began to catch on in popularity.

Current systems usually use photosensors mounted in the rearview mirror to detect light and dim the mirror by means of electrochromism. This electrochromic feature has also been incorporated into side-view mirrors allowing them to dim and reduce glare as well.

== Suspending objects ==
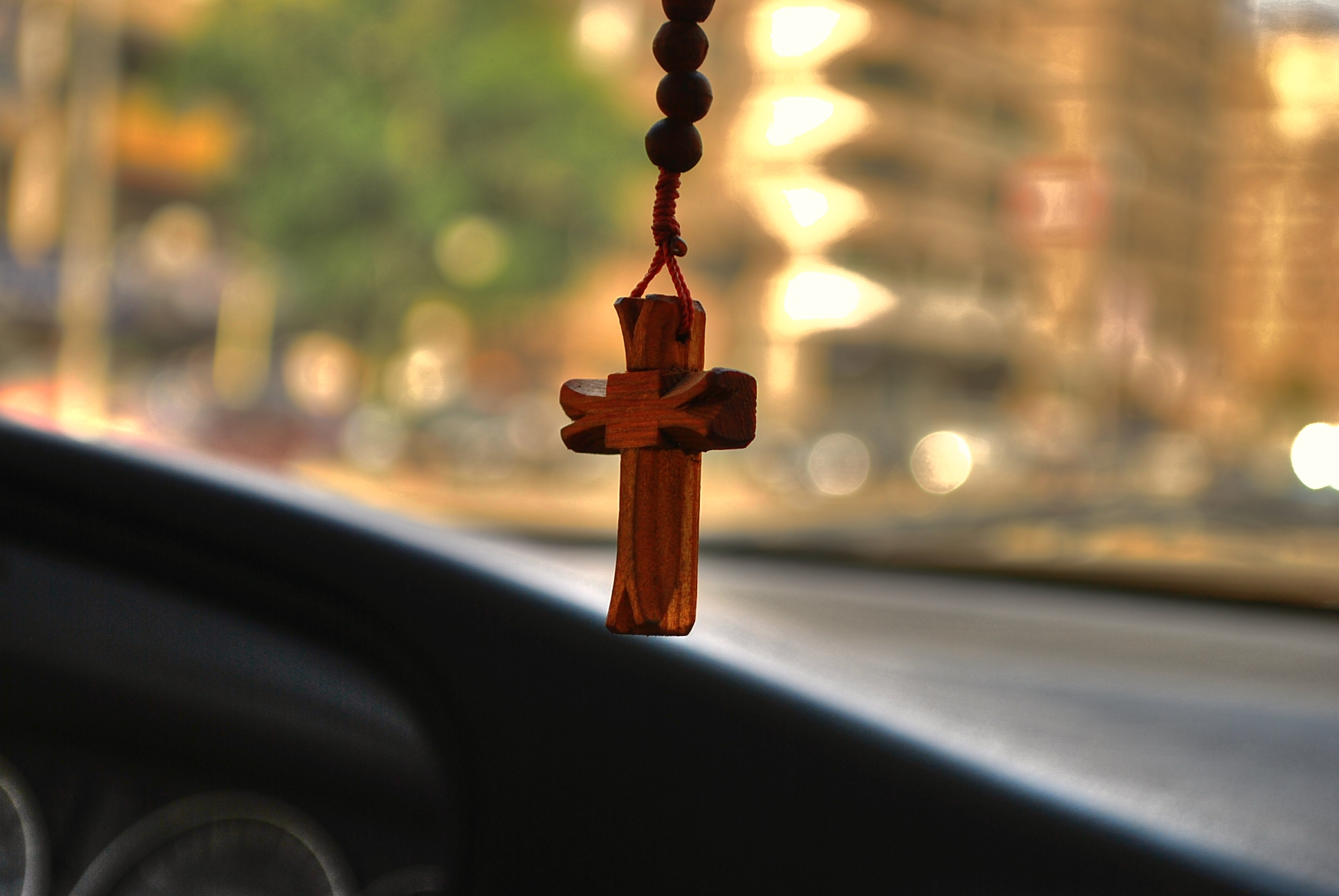
A cross necklace suspended from the rearview mirror of an automobile

Objects are sometimes hung from the rearview mirror, including cross necklaces, prayer beads, good luck charms, decorations like fuzzy dice, and air fresheners like Little Trees. In some jurisdictions such hanging is illegal on the basis that it impairs the driver's forward view and so compromises safety. Black Lives Matter protesters have cited this as an example of the minor violations used as pretextual grounds for traffic stops disproportionately targeting black drivers.

== Trucks and buses ==
On trucks and buses, the load often blocks rearward vision out the backlight. In the U.S. virtually all trucks and buses have a side view mirror on each side, often mounted on the doors and viewed out the side windows, which are used for rear vision. These mirrors leave a large unviewable ("blind") area behind the vehicle, which tapers down as the distance increases. This is a safety issue which the driver must compensate for, often with a person guiding the truck back in congested areas, or by backing in a curve. "Spot mirrors", a convex mirror which provides a distorted image of the entire side of the vehicle, are commonly mounted on at least the right side of a vehicle. In the U.S. mirrors are considered "safety equipment", and are not included in width restrictions.

== Motorcycles ==
Depending on the type of motorcycle, the motorcycle may or may not have rearview mirrors. Street-legal motorcycles are generally required to have rearview mirrors. Motorcycles for off-road use only normally do not have rearview mirrors. Rearview mirrors come in various shapes and designs and have various methods of mounting the mirrors to the motorcycle, most commonly to the handlebars. Rearview mirrors can also be attached to the rider's motorcycle helmet. The Reevu MSX1 helmet uses an internal periscope that allows the user rear vision.

== Bicycles ==
Some bicycles are equipped with a rearview mirror mounted on a handlebar. Rearview mirrors may also be fitted to the bicycle frame, on a helmet, on the arm or the frame of a pair of eyeglasses. This allows what is behind to be checked continuously without turning round. Rearview mirrors almost never come with a new bicycle and require an additional purchase.

== Aircraft ==
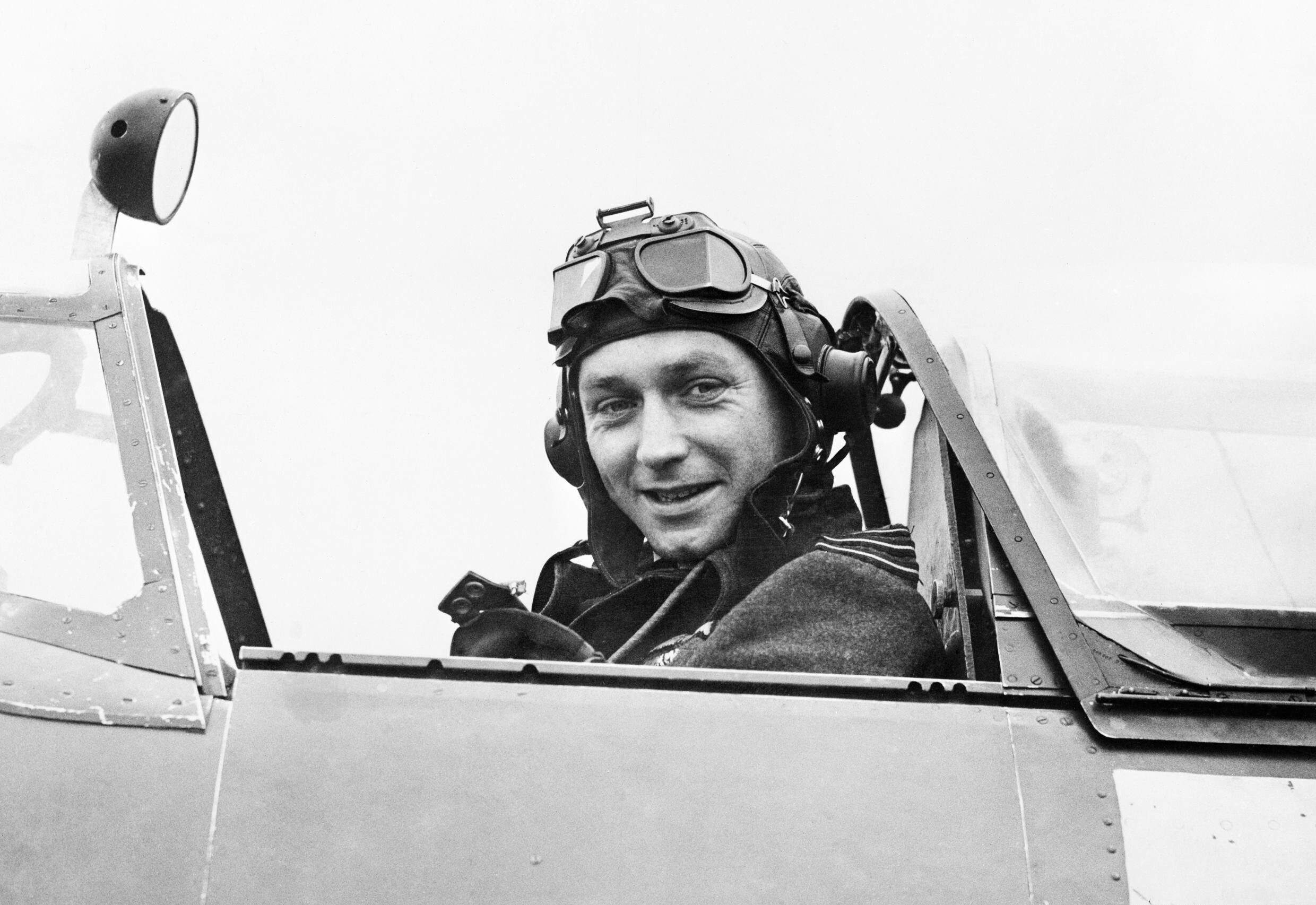
Rearview mirror of a Supermarine Spitfire Mk XII fighter aircraft (1943)

By 1956, the Civil Aeronautics Administration had approved a rearview mirror for light aircraft. They also predicted periscopes in larger aircraft. Fighter aircraft usually have one or more rearview mirrors mounted on the front canopy frame to watch out for chasing aircraft.

== See also ==
- Automatic parking
- Backup collision
- Backup camera
- Blind spot monitor
- Blind spot (vehicle)
- Dashcam
- Intelligent Parking Assist System
- Experimental Safety Vehicle (ESV)
- Intelligent car
- Lane departure warning system
- List of auto parts
- Precrash system
- Wing mirror
