= Earl Dew =

American jockey

Personal information
- Born: May 2, 1921 Sac City, Iowa, United States
- Died: February 2, 1941 (aged 19) Tijuana, Baja California, Mexico
- Occupation: Jockey

Horse racing career
- Sport: Horse racing
- Career wins: Not found

Racing awards
- United States Champion Jockey by wins (1940)

Significant horses
- Mioland
- Updated on March 21, 2007

Earl Dew (May 2, 1921 – February 2, 1941) was an American champion jockey in thoroughbred horse racing who was being hailed as one of the most promising riders of his generation when he died at age 19 in a racing accident.

== Early life ==
Earl Dew was born in Sac City, Iowa, the son of John Dew and his wife Mable Hass. His father raced horses in the Midwestern United States and Earl, under his father's tutelage, learned to ride at an early age.

== Career ==
He began his professional career in 1937 and by 1938 was making a name for himself when he competed at tracks such as Sportsman's Park in Chicago. Later that year, Dew was the leading rider at Fair Grounds Race Course in New Orleans until he was sidelined with a broken leg as a result of a November 29 racing accident. In 1939, Dew rode at Santa Anita Park, Bay Meadows and Tanforan in California, plus at Agua Caliente Racetrack in Tijuana, Mexico.

== Championship year ==
In 1940, Dew captivated North American racing fans when he and fellow 19-year-old jockey Walter Lee Taylor battled for that year's riding title and were tied with two days left on the calendar. In what The New York Times described as the "Transcontinental Struggle for American Championship," Dew was competing at Agua Caliente Racetrack in Tijuana, Mexico, and Taylor at Tropical Park Race Track in Coral Gables, Florida. On the final day, Earl Dew captured the 1940 national championship with 287 wins, one more than his opponent who had been injured in a fall during the same day.

The January 16, 1941 Los Angeles Times reported that Dew said the best horse he rode in 1940 was Mioland, a colt bred and raced that year by a man named H. W. Ray.

On January 7, 1941, Iowa native sons Earl Dew and baseball star Bob Feller were honored at ceremonies in the state capital of Des Moines. On February 2, Dew was at the Agua Caliente Racetrack for a gold watch presentation in recognition of his 1940 jockey's championship clinched at that track. He was riding in the sixth race when he was involved in a three-horse accident and died while en route to hospital of a cerebral hemorrhage resulting from a fractured skull. On March 3 a special ceremony was held in his memory at Santa Anita Park.

== Death ==
Dew was killed on February 2, 1941, in a horse race in Tijuana, Mexico.
