= Xalapa Farm =

Coordinates: 38.1673°N 84.1524°W

Xalapa Farm is an American thoroughbred horse breeding stable near Paris, Kentucky.

== History ==
Xalapa was founded by William Thomas Buckner of Virginia in 1827 and passed on to a son Henry who in 1897 sold it to Confederate Col. William Erskine Simms. On his death the property was left to sons William and Edward, the latter buying out his brother's interest in 1915.

Edward Simms imported the famous French horses Prince Palatine and Negofol to stand at stud at Xalapa Farm. Among his offspring, Negofol sired 1917 Belmont Stakes winner Hourless and the 1925 Preakness Stakes winner Coventry.

Over the years, best known among the horses bred at Xalapa Farm were graded stakes race winners such as Suave Dancer who in 1991 won the Irish Champion Stakes and Prix de l'Arc de Triomphe, and “blue hen” broodmare Hildene who was sold to Christopher Chenery in 1939 following Edward Simms' death. For Chenery, Hildene produced the 1950 American Horse of the Year Hill Prince as well as Champion First Landing who sired U.S. Racing Hall of Fame inductee Riva Ridge.

The stable's racing colors are canary and purple.

Since 2019 Xalapa Farm has been owned by Hill 'n' Dale Farms' John G. Sikura. In October 2020, Hill 'n' Dale closed their operations in Lexington and the entire stallion roster was relocated to Xalapa.
