= Elmer Berger (inventor) =

American inventor

Elmer Clinton Adolph Berger (12 August 1891 – 15 July 1952) was an inventor born in St. Louis, Missouri who is credited with the invention of the automotive rear-view mirror in the early 1900s. Although racing enthusiast Ray Harroun experimented with one as early as 1911 while driving in the Indianapolis 500, it was Elmer Berger who obtained the first patent in 1921. Through his Berger and Company he manufactured the rear-view mirror for automobile use. He named his device the "COP-SPOTTER."

== Thoroughbred racing ==
In the 1930s and 40s, Elmer Berger owned a prominent Thoroughbred racing stable in California. One of his colts, Boot and Spur, trained by U.S. Racing Hall of Fame inductee William Molter, ran in the 1942 Kentucky Derby. Another stakes horse, Stitch Again, ran second in the 1947 Santa Anita Handicap.

Elmer Berger died in Los Angeles in 1952 and was interred in the Cathedral Mausoleum #1405 at Hollywood Forever Cemetery.
