= Indian Broom =

American Thoroughbred racehorse

- Sire: Brooms
- Grandsire: Broomstick
- Dam: Kawita
- Damsire: Donnacona
- Sex: Stallion
- Foaled: 1933
- Country: United States
- Color: Chestnut
- Breeder: Brookmeade Stable
- Owner: Brookmeade Stable; A. C. T. Stock Farm Stable
- Trainer: Robert A. Smith; Darrell F. Cannon
- Record: 65: 14-10-11
- Earnings: US$72,840

Major wins
- Golden Jubilee Handicap (1936); Marchbank Handicap (1936, 1938); Peninsula Handicap (1936); Vancouver Celebration Handicap (1936); Glendora Handicap (1937); San Juan Capistrano Handicap (1938)
- Last updated on April 28, 2021

Indian Broom (foaled 1933 in Virginia) was an American Thoroughbred racehorse who on April 11, 1936 set a track and World record for a mile and one-eighth on dirt at California's Tanforan Racetrack and who returned the next year on December 4, 1937 and broke that same track's record again in a six furlong sprint.

== Background ==
Bred by the Brookmeade Stud of Isabel Dodge Sloane, Indian Broom was sold in February 1936 to Canadian businessman Austin C. Taylor for what turned out to be a bargain-basement price of $4,000. The colt's race conditioning was then placed with trainer Darrell Cannon.

== Racing career ==
In his only start in the U.S. Triple Crown series, Indian Broom ran third to winner Bold Venture in the 1936 Kentucky Derby.

Indian Broom's 1936 World record was set in Tanforan's Marchbank Handicap. In an interview several days later, jockey Basil James said that Indian Broom could have gone even faster as he had "never made a move" with the colt. Indian Broom won the Marchbank Handicap again in 1938. However, that year his most important win came in the San Juan Capistrano Handicap at Santa Anita Park.

== Pedigree ==
Pedigree of Indian Broom, chestnut colt, 1933
Sire Brooms	Broomstick	Ben Brush	Bramble
Sire Brooms	Broomstick	Ben Brush	Roseville
Sire Brooms	Broomstick	Elf	Galliard
Sire Brooms	Broomstick	Elf	Sylvabelle
Sire Brooms	Sis Martin	Sir Martin	Ogden
Sire Brooms	Sis Martin	Sir Martin	Lady Sterling
Sire Brooms	Sis Martin	Almond Rock	Wolf's Crag
Sire Brooms	Sis Martin	Almond Rock	Sugar
Dam Kawita	Donnacona	Prince Palatine	Persimmon
Dam Kawita	Donnacona	Prince Palatine	Lady Lightfoot
Dam Kawita	Donnacona	Kildonan	Ladsa
Dam Kawita	Donnacona	Kildonan	Lochnell
Dam Kawita	Kiwanah	The Curragh	Spearmint
Dam Kawita	Kiwanah	The Curragh	Currajong
Dam Kawita	Kiwanah	Tuscaloosa	Chuctanunda
Dam Kawita	Kiwanah	Tuscaloosa	Sadaquada (family: 9-f)
