= Earl Graham =

American jockey

Earl Sandy Graham
Personal information
- Born: 1911 Los Angeles, California
- Died: September 22, 1927 (aged 16) Winnipeg, Manitoba, Canada
- Occupation: jockey

Horse racing career
- Sport: Horse racing

Earl "Sandy" Graham (1911 – September 22, 1927) was an American jockey in Thoroughbred horse racing who died as a result of a racing accident.

Born in Los Angeles, California, Graham rode in pre-1940 when jockeys had no union representation and at a time when they were the contracted legal property of a racing stable owner who bore no responsibility for their job safety. Riding horses at their fastest speed possible was dangerous work and technology at the time meant a jockey's only protection from a head injury in a racing accident was a cardboard skullcap without a chin strap to secure it in place.

In the autumn of 1927, Graham was competing at the Polo Park Racetrack in Winnipeg, Manitoba, Canada. On September 1, he was running ahead of the field aboard a colt named Vesper Lad when the horse stumbled and threw him to the ground. Trampled by other oncoming horses, Graham's back was broken and his chest was crushed. With no ambulance service available, he lay on the track until several jockeys carried him to the tack room. Stablemate and close friend Tommy Luther pleaded with racetrack officials to take Graham to a hospital but to no avail. His fellow jockeys could not help, as they were under contract to race and were afraid of the consequences if they left the track to get him medical attention. According to a February 24, 2001 Thoroughbred Times recount of the event, Luther begged officials to take the stricken boy to a hospital, but no one would. The riders could not do it themselves, as each was obligated to ride in upcoming races, and to leave the jockey's room would probably have cost them their livelihoods. Desperate to do something to aide his injured friend, Tommy Luther took up a collection to pay for a taxi. However, at a time when most jockeys did not receive a share of the race purse, they did not have enough money among them to pay the cab fare. All afternoon Luther stayed with his suffering friend, unable to do anything more than drip water into his parched mouth. At the end of the day's racecard, someone finally offered to drive Graham to the hospital but by then it made little difference and he died ten days later.

The sixteen-year-old Graham had no savings and there was no life insurance provided by either his employer or the race track. His impoverished family could not afford to have his remains returned home to Los Angeles, and as such he was buried in an unmarked pauper's grave in the Brookside Cemetery in Winnipeg. Graham's story was told by author Laura Hillenbrand in her 2001 number one bestselling book, Seabiscuit: An American Legend (pp. 69–70). The publicity Graham's death received as a consequence of the book's popularity, and the ensuing success of the 2003 film Seabiscuit resulted in a new headstone being erected at his grave. The bottom of the stone reads: "Remembered By His Fellow Jockeys". Slaid Cleaves also brought to life the story in a song "Quick as Dreams" on his 2004 album Wishbone.
