= Carroll Bierman =

American jockey (1918–1970)

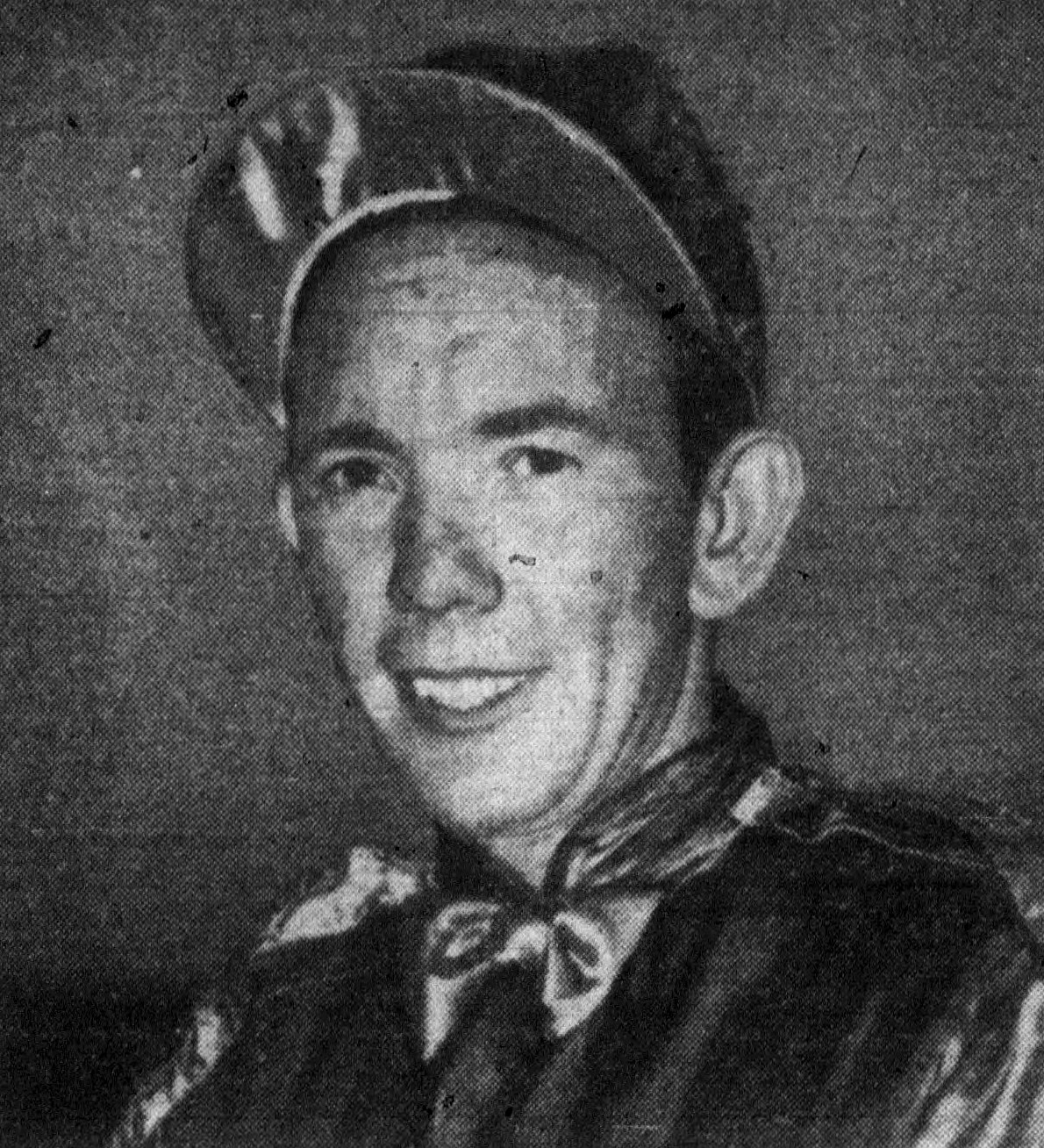
- Bierman, circa 1947

Personal information
- Born: October 22, 1918 Centralia, Illinois, United States
- Died: March 22, 1970 (aged 51)
- Occupation: Jockey

Horse racing career
- Sport: Horse racing

Major racing wins
- Hialeah Turf Cup Handicap (1938); Clark Handicap (1939, 1943, 1953); Kentucky Handicap (1939); Kentucky Oaks (1939); Santa Anita Derby (1939); Potomac Handicap (1940); San Carlos Handicap (1940); Washington Park Futurity Stakes (1940); Arlington Classic (1941); Betsy Ross Stakes (1941); Champagne Stakes (1941); San Vicente Stakes (1941); Derby Trial Stakes (1942); Dwyer Stakes (1942); Jerome Handicap (1942); New York Handicap (1942); Remsen Stakes (1942); Selima Stakes (1942); Arlington Matron Handicap (1943); Pimlico Oaks (1943); Dade Handicap (1946); American Handicap (1949); Breeders' Futurity Stakes (1951); Bryan and O'Hara Handicap (1951); Olympic Handicap (1951); Chicago Handicap (1953); Hawthorne Juvenile Stakes (1954); Michigan Mile Handicap (1953); White Mountain Handicap (1957); American Classics wins: Kentucky Derby (1940)

Racing awards
- Suffolk Downs Champion Jockey by wins (1942); Suffolk Downs Champion Jockey by earnings (1942); Del Mar Racetrack Champion Jockey by wins (1947)

Honours
- Centralia Sports Hall of Fame (1981)

Significant horses
- Alsab, Askmenow, Double Jay, Gallahadion, Mioland, On Trust, Royal Governor

Carroll M. Bierman (October 22, 1918 – March 22, 1970) was an American Thoroughbred horse racing jockey born in Centralia, Illinois. In 1940, he won the Kentucky Derby on Gallahadion in an upset over heavily favored Bimelech. That Derby ride is considered one of the best by a jockey in America's great race. Gallahadion paid $72.40 on a $2 bet for winning the "Run for the Roses" in the colors of Ethel V. Mars, of the Mars Candy fortune. He rode in the Kentucky Derby four times and finished 3rd, 4th, and 6th in the other three. He also won the 1939 Santa Anita Derby aboard the filly Ciencia.

On September 19 of 1942, in one of the great races of the American Turf, Bierman rode Preakness Stakes winner Alsab to victory over 1941 U.S. Triple Crown Champion Whirlaway in a famous match race at Narragansett Park.

Bierman's burgeoning career was interrupted by service with the United States Navy during World War II. Discharged in May 1945, he returned to racing after a fitness regimen designed to shed the weight he had gained.

He was a founding member of the Jockeys' Guild.

He rests at Elmwood Cemetery in Centralia, Illinois.
