= Austin Cotterell Taylor =

Canadian mining executive (1889–1965)

Austin Taylor
- Born: January 17, 1889; East York, Ontario, Canada
- Died: November 1, 1965 (aged 76); Vancouver, British Columbia, Canada
- Spouse: Kathleen Elliott (died 1972)
- Children: 3, including Patricia
- Honours: Order of the British Empire, Canadian Horse Racing Hall of Fame

Major Austin Cotterell Taylor, CBE (January 17, 1889 – November 1, 1965) was a Canadian mining executive and developer, financier, and philanthropist in developing thoroughbred horse racing in British Columbia.

== Background ==
Born in East York, Ontario, Austin Taylor was educated at St. Andrew's College, located at that time in Toronto, Ontario; he would later become a member of the school's Board of Governors. Taylor would make his home in the province of British Columbia where he would make a fortune in the mining and lumber industries, notably through Bralorne Mines, Ltd. of which he was President. An influential business figure in Canada, in 1934 The Wall Street Journal announced his appointment to the Board of Directors of British Columbia Power Corp. and later was appointed a director of the Bank of Canada.

Austin Taylor married Kathleen Elliott of Winnipeg, Manitoba, with whom he had three children. Daughter, Patricia Aldyen Austin Taylor married American conservative author and commentator William F. Buckley, Jr.

== Wartime service ==
During World War I, Austin Taylor was part of the Canadian military and was appointed director of the Department of Aeronautical Supplies with responsibility for overseeing the harvesting and preparation of spruce lumber for military aircraft production. During World War II, Major Taylor was appointed chairman of the British Columbia Security Commission, a provincial government agency created to manage Japanese Canadian internment. In recognition of his service, Taylor was made a Commander of the Order of the British Empire.

Austin Taylor died at age seventy-six in 1965.

== Thoroughbred racing ==
For his substantial contribution to the development of thoroughbred racing, Austin Taylor was voted part of the inaugural class of inductees in the Canadian Horse Racing Hall of Fame Builders category. Beyond racing, Taylor became involved with breeding through his A.C.T. Stock Farm located near Vancouver in the community of Milner.

According to his biography at the Hall of Fame, Austin Taylor "assembled the most powerful stable ever seen in Western Canada during the 1930s." His racing stable competed in Vancouver as well as at tracks throughout California. In 1936, his horses won every handicap of importance at the Tanforan Racetrack meeting including Indian Broom who set a world record of 1:47 3/5 for a mile and an eighth on dirt. Indian Broom went on to run third in the Kentucky Derby and in his four years of racing won a number of races including the San Juan Capistrano Handicap. Among Austin Taylor's other successful horses:

- Special Agent - won the 1937 San Pasqual Handicap, at Santa Anita Park, equaling the track record;
- Minulus - won the 1938 Santa Anita Oaks;
- Whichcee - wins include the 1937 San Francisco Handicap, the San Antonio Handicap, plus the inaugural running of the Los Angeles Handicap at Hollywood Park Racetrack in 1938;
- Colonel Mack - in 1956 won the Los Angeles Handicap and the Bing Crosby Handicap at Del Mar Racetrack.
