= Ethel V. Mars =

American racehorse owner (1884–1945)

- Born: Ethel Veronica Healy; 1884; Petersburg, North Dakota, US
- Died: December 25, 1945 (aged 60–61); La Jolla, California, US
- Resting place: Lakewood Cemetery, Minneapolis, Minnesota, US
- Occupation: Businessperson
- Known for: Milky Way Farm; Gallahadion
- Family: Mars family

Ethel Veronica Mars (née Healy; June 1884 – December 25, 1945) was an American businesswoman and racehorse owner. She was Ethel Veronica Healy prior to her marriage in 1910 to Franklin Clarence Mars, the founder of the candy company Mars Inc.

In 1930, she and her husband purchased a 2,800-acre property in Giles County, Tennessee, where they built Milky Way Farm. There, they raised Hereford cattle as well as bred Thoroughbred racehorses which were trained on a racetrack built on the property.

== Early life ==
Ethel Veronica Healy was born on June 25, 1884, in Petersburg, North Dakota. Her father died when she was young, and her mother, Mary Healy, married Louis Kruppenbacher in November 1892. This Ethel entered adult life as Ethel Veronica Kruppenbacher.

== Milky Way Farm Stable ==
The Thoroughbred racing stable of Ethel and Franklin Mars began competing at major eastern United States racetracks in 1934 and following her husband's death that year, Ethel Mars took charge of all operations. Wanting to expand her racing and develop her bloodstock, from 1935 through 1942 she was a major spender for well-bred yearlings at the Saratoga spring sales.

In 1936, her Milky Way Farm stable's race winnings totaled $206,450, making the Milky Way Farm stable the year's most successful owner on the United States thoroughbred racing circuit. In 1935, her filly Forever Yours, trained by Robert V. McGarvey was voted American Champion Two-Year-Old Filly. In 1937, her filly Mars Shield won the Kentucky Oaks. Then on May 4, 1940, Ethel Mars had her greatest single achievement in racing with her colt Gallahadion. Trained by Roy Waldron and ridden by Carroll Bierman, Gallahadion won the Kentucky Derby.

Declining health in the years following her Kentucky Derby win saw Ethel Mars wind down her racing and operations. A resident of River Forest, Illinois, Ethel Mars died at age sixty-one on Christmas Day 1945 in La Jolla, California, where she had been visiting. She was buried in Lakewood Cemetery.
