= Morton L. Schwartz =

American banker (1883–1953)

- Born: August 1883; Louisville, Kentucky, U.S.
- Died: January 11, 1953 (aged 69); Manhattan, New York, U.S.
- Occupations: Banker, Financier, racehorse owner/breeder
- Spouse: Elinor Balke
- Children: Cynthia Botsford Nancy Hurd
- Parent(s): Moses Schwartz; Eugenia Lehman

Morton L. Schwartz (August, 1883 - January 11, 1953) was an American banker and financier who was a member of the New York Stock Exchange and a major owner and breeder of Thoroughbred racehorses.

== Horse racing ==
Morton Schwartz owned Elsmeade Farm on Russell Cave Pike near Lexington, Kentucky. Successful horses he raced included:

- Gusto, leading money earner in the United States in 1932
- Bold Venture, 1936 Kentucky Derby and Preakness Stakes
- Enfilade, 1918 American Champion Three-Year-Old Filly

On August 21, 1935, Morton Schwartz sold all his bloodstock through a Fasig-Tipton dispersal auction held at Saratoga Springs, New York. Among the yearlings sold was a filly later named Dawn Play who would turn out to be the last Champion Schwartz bred when she was voted 1937 American Champion Three-Year-Old Filly.

Morton Schwartz was a twin to brother Charles who won England's prestigious Grand National at Aintree Racecourse in 1926 with Jack Horner.
