= Mioland =

American-bred Thoroughbred racehorse

- Sire: Mio D'Arezzo
- Grandsire: Laland
- Dam: Iolanda
- Damsire: Vespasian
- Sex: Stallion
- Foaled: 1937
- Country: United States
- Colour: Bay
- Breeder: H. W. Ray
- Owner: Charles S. Howard
- Trainer: Tom Smith
- Record: 50: 18-10-6
- Earnings: US$244,270

Major wins
- American Derby (1940); Westchester Handicap (1940); Potomac Handicap (1940); San Juan Capistrano Handicap (1940, 1941); American Handicap (1941); New Year Handicap (1941); San Antonio Handicap (1941); San Pasqual Handicap (1941); Coral Gables Handicap (1942) American Classic Race placing: Preakness Stakes 2nd (1940)

Awards
- DRF American Champion Older Male Horse (1941)

Honours
- Mioland Drive, Los Angeles, California

Mioland (1937–1951) was an American Champion Thoroughbred racehorse. Bred in Oregon by H. W. Ray, he was out of the mare Iolanda. His German-born sire was Mio D'Arezzo, a winner of the Deutsches St. Leger who had been imported to stand at stud in the United States.

== Early career ==
At age two, Mioland was regularly ridden by Earl Dew, who won several races aboard the colt at California racetracks. Owner H. W. Ray sold Mioland to Charles Howard as a three-year-old. He was trained by future U.S. Racing Hall of Fame trainer Tom Smith.

In the 1940 U.S. Triple Crown series, under jockey Lester Balaski, Mioland ran fourth to winner Gallahadion in the Kentucky Derby, then second to Bimelech in the Preakness Stakes. He did not run in the Belmont Stakes but that year he won the Potomac and Westchester Handicaps in the Northeastern United States, then the prestigious American Derby at Chicago then in California, the San Juan Capistrano Handicap.

== Later career ==
Mioland remained on the West Coast of the United States where he won three important races in 1941, including his second consecutive San Juan Capistrano Handicap. What makes his back-to-back wins even more notable is that the 1940 win was at a distance of 1 1/16 miles, but the 1941 win came at the much longer distance of 1 1/2 miles. Mioland's 1941 performances earned him American Champion Older Male Horse honors from Daily Racing Form. The rival Turf & Sports Digest award was won by Big Pebble.

Mioland raced at age five on the United States East Coast, where his best results were a record-breaking win in the 1942 Coral Gables Handicap at Tropical Park, a second-place finish behind Challedon in the Philadelphia Handicap at Havre de Grace Racetrack and a third in the Dixie Handicap to 1941 Triple Crown winner Whirlaway.

Retired to stud duty, Mioland had limited success as a sire but did get several winners of minor races before dying in 1951 at the relatively early age of fourteen.
