= Edward F. Simms =

American lawyer and industrialist (1871–1938)

- Born: Edward Francis Simms; March 5, 1871; Paris, Kentucky, U.S.
- Died: December 6, 1938 (aged 67); Baltimore, Maryland, U.S.
- Resting place: Glenwood Cemetery; Paris Cemetery
- Education: Yale University (BA); University of Virginia School of Law (LLB)
- Occupations: Lawyer, oil industrialist, racehorse owner & breeder
- Board member of: Simms Oil Company, Xalapa Farm
- Spouse: Lillie Lee Weir

Edward Francis Simms (March 5, 1871 – December 6, 1938) was an American lawyer, oil industrialist, and owner and breeder of Thoroughbred racehorses about whom a Houston Post obituary said his career was "a saga of American accomplishment."

A graduate of Yale University and the University of Virginia School of Law, at the turn of the 20th Century Simms went to Texas where he made a fortune in oil exploration in the Sour Lake area. While at Yale, he was a member of Delta Kappa Epsilon fraternity. In 1915 he returned to Kentucky where he bought out his brother William's share in Xalapa Farm near Paris, Kentucky, a property they had inherited from their father. Edward Simms would become a successful breeder of Thoroughbred racehorses.

Simms died on December 6, 1938, at Johns Hopkins Hospital in Baltimore, Maryland where he had been undergoing treatment for leukemia. He was buried in Paris Cemetery. He was buried at Glenwood Cemetery.
