= Gallahadion =

American-bred Thoroughbred racehorse

- Sire: Sir Gallahad III
- Grandsire: Teddy
- Dam: Countess Time
- Damsire: Reigh Count
- Sex: Stallion
- Foaled: 1937
- Country: USA
- Colour: Bay
- Breeder: Robert A. Fairbairn
- Owner: Milky Way Farm Stable; Silks: Orange, White Star, White Sleeves, Chocolate & White Cap
- Trainer: Roy Waldron
- Record: 36: 6-6-4
- Earnings: $92,620

Major wins
- San Vicente Stakes (1940); Kentucky Derby (1940); Domino Purse (1941)

Honours
- Gallahadion Court in Cranberry Township, Pennsylvania; Jacksonville, Florida; Owensboro, Kentucky; Parker, Colorado; Tallahassee, Florida; Winchester, Kentucky
- Last updated on July 9, 2013

Gallahadion (March 31, 1937 – July 7, 1958) was an American Thoroughbred racehorse best known as the 1940 winner of the Kentucky Derby. He was a son of the Champion sire Sir Gallahad III, and his dam-sire was U.S. Horse of the Year Reigh Count, who won the 1928 Kentucky Derby. Owned by Ethel V. Mars' Milky Way Farm Stable, named for her company's famous chocolate bar brand, Gallahadion raced at age three in California. Although he was unplaced in the Santa Anita Derby and the San Juan Capistrano Handicap, after winning the 1940 San Vicente Stakes and finishing second in the Derby Trial, Gallahadion was entered in the Kentucky Derby.

== Triple Crown races ==
In the 1940 Kentucky Derby, Edward R. Bradley's colt Bimelech, the 1939 U.S. 2-Year-Old Champion, was the overwhelming favorite, bet down to 40¢ on the dollar. Mioland, owned by Charles S. Howard of Seabiscuit fame, was a very distant second choice at more than 6:1 odds. Given almost no chance, Gallahadion was sent off as a 36:1 longshot but under jockey Carroll Bierman scored an upset over Bimelech. For owner Ethel V. Mars, whom the May 9, 1940 Centralia Illinois Evening Sentinel reported had spent more than $500,000 buying horses since 1935 with the eye to winning the Derby. Gallahadion was her eighth horse to run in the Derby in the past six years. Previously, Mrs. Mars' best results came in 1935 and 1937 when her horses finished third. A severe cold kept her at home and she was not at Churchill Downs to see her horse capture the one race she had wanted to win most of all. In the second and third legs of the U.S. Triple Crown, Bimelech won both races. Gallahadion finished third in the Preakness Stakes, then found the extra distance in the 1½ mile Belmont Stakes too much and was unplaced.

During the remainder of 1940, Gallahadion met with little success, as he did the following year when he raced at age four.
