= Illinois Derby top three finishers =

This is a listing of the horses that finished in either first, second, or third place and the number of starters in the Illinois Derby, an American Grade 2 race for three-year-olds at 1-1/8 miles on dirt held at Hawthorne Race Course in Cicero, Illinois. (List 1970-present)

Year	Winner	Second	Third	Starters
2024	Patriot Spirit	Real Men Violin	Woodcourt	5
2018-2023	Race not run			
2017	Multiplier	Hedge Fund	It's Your Nickel	7
2016	Race not run			
2015	Whiskey Ticket	Conquest Curlinate	Phenomenal Phoenix	8
2014	Dynamic Impact	Midnight Hawk	Irish You Well	14
2013	Departing	Fordubai	Siete de Oros	14
2012	Done Talking	Morgan's Guerilla	Hakama	12
2011	Joe Vann	Zoebear	The Fed Eased	12
2010	American Lion	Yawanna Twist	Backtalk	8
2009	Musket Man	Giant Oak	His Greatness	10
2008	Recapturetheglory	Golden Spikes	Z Humor	7
2007	Cowtown Cat	Reporting for Duty	Bold Start	9
2006	Sweetnorthernsaint	Mister Triester	Cause to Believe	10
2005	Greeley's Galaxy	Monarch Lane	Magna Graduate	8
2004	Pollard's Vision	Song of the Sword	Suave	11
2003	Ten Most Wanted	Fund of Funds	Foufa's Warrior	10
2002	War Emblem	Repent	Fonz's	9
2001	Distilled	Saint Damien	Dream Run	8
2000	Performing Magic	Country Only	Country Coast	9
1999	Vision and Verse	Prime Directive	Pineaff	10
1998	Yarrow Brae	One Bold Stroke	Orville N Wilbur's	10
1997	Wild Rush	Anet	Saratoga Sunrise	8
1996	Natural Selection	El Amante	Irish Conquest	13
1995	Peaks and Valleys	Da Hoss	Western Echo	13
1994	Rustic Light	Amathos	Seminole Wind	7
1993	Antrim Rd.	Seattle Morn	Secret Negotiator	13
1992	Dignitas	American Chance	Straight to Bed	13
1991	Richman	Doc of the Day	Nowork all Play	14
1990	Dotsero	Sound of Cannons	Hofre	9
1989	Music Merci	Notation	Endow	7
1988	Proper Reality	Jim's Orbit	Classic Account	6
1987	Lost Code	Blanco	Valid Prospect	7
1986	Bolshoi Boy	Speedy Shannon	Blue Buckaroo	8
1985	Important Business	Nostalgia's Star	Another Reef	13
1984	Delta Trace	Wind Flyer	Birdie's Legend	10
1983	Gen'l Practitioner	Passing Base	Aztec Red	10
1982	Star Gallant	Drop Your Drawers	Soy Emperor	8
1981	Paristo	Pass the Tab	Biterrook	13
1980	Ray's Word	Mighty Return	Stutz Blackhawk	11
1979	Smarten	Clever Trick	Julie's Dancer	6
1978	Batonnier	Raymond Earl	Silver Nitrate	12
1977	Flag Officer	Time Call	Cisk	11
1976	Life's Hope	Wardlaw	New Collection	9
1975	Colonel Power	Ruggles Ferry	Methdioxya	14
1974	Sharp Gary	Sr. Diplomat	Sports Editor	12
1973	Big Whippendeal	What Will Be	Golden Don	9
1972	Fame and Power	No Le Hace		8
1971	Race not run			
1970	Race not run			
