= Rushaway Stakes =

American Thoroughbred horse race

- Class: Non-Listed Black Type
- Location: Turfway Park; Florence, Kentucky
- Inaugurated: 1986
- Race type: Thoroughbred - Flat racing
- Website: www.turfway.com

Race information
- Distance: 1^{1}/16 miles (8.5 furlongs)
- Track: Tapeta synthetic dirt, left-handed
- Qualification: Three-years-old
- Weight: Assigned
- Purse: $75,000

The Rushaway Stakes is an American ungraded Thoroughbred horse race held annually at Turfway Park in Florence, Kentucky. It was first run on March 22, 1986, the last year the racetrack was called Latonia. The race is open to three-year-old horses and run over a distance of one and one sixteenth miles (8.5 furlongs). Originally raced on natural dirt, and for the first two years at one mile, since 2021 it has been contested on Tapeta synthetic dirt.

The race is named in honor of the racehorse Rushaway who, on Friday afternoon, May 22, 1936, won the Illinois Derby at Aurora Downs in Aurora, Illinois. That night, the three-year-old gelding was shipped three hundred miles south via express train to the Latonia Race Track in Latonia, Kentucky where on Saturday he won the Latonia Derby. Rushaway's feat of endurance is unmatched and still talked about more than eighty years later. His accomplishment in the Latonia Derby was made even more remarkable because Rushaway was carrying top weight in the eight-horse field by three pounds yet won by 6 lengths and did it in a new race record time for the mile-and-a-quarter distance.

== Records ==
Speed record:

- 1 1/16 miles - 1:40.60 - Anet (1997) NTR

Most wins by a jockey:

- 5 - Pat Day (1989, 1991, 1994, 2002, 2003)

Most wins by a trainer:

- 2 - William R. Helmbrecht (1987, 1989)
- 2 - Neil J. Howard (1993, 1994)
- 2 - Bob Baffert (1997, 1998)
- 2 - Todd Pletcher (2006, 2010)
- 2 - Darrin Miller (2007, 2009)

Most wins by an owner:

- 2 - William S. Farish III (1993, 1994)
- 2 - Team Valor (1995, 2013)
- 2 - Silverton Hill LLC (2007, 2009)

== Winners ==
Year	Winner	Jockey	Trainer	Owner	Dist. (mi)	Time	Win$
2018	Alternative Route	Mitchell Murrill	Albert Stall Jr.	Spendthrift/Town & Country Racing	11/16	1:46.38	$75,000
2017	Montu	Rodney Prescott	Joseph C. Deegan	Deegan/Alfred Pais/Zephyr Racing	11/16	1:44.85	$75,000
2016	He'll Pay	Mitchell Murrill	J. Larry Jones	Brereton C. Jones	11/16	1:44.29	$75,000
2015	Race not held						
2014	Race not held						
2013	Crop Report	Joel Rosario	H. Graham Motion	Team Valor International	11/16	1:45.66	$75,000
2012	Flashy Dresser	Luis Contreras	Frederick J. Seitz	Frederick J. Seitz	11/16	1:45.58	$75,000
2011	Swift Warrior	Javier Castellano	John Terranova II	James Covello & James Dolan	11/16	1:45.73	$100,000
2010	Exhi	Russell Baze	Todd Pletcher	Wertheimer et Frère	11/16	1:44.47	$100,000
2009	Cliffy's Future	Jesus Castanon	Darrin Miller	Silverton Hill LLC	11/16	1:44.38	$100,000
2008	Big Glen	Rene Douglas	Frank L. Brothers	John T. L. Jones & Bill Jones	11/16	1:44.55	$100,000
2007	Dominican	Rafael Bejarano	Darrin Miller	Silverton Hill LLC	11/16	1:43.50	$100,000
2006	High Cotton	Christopher DeCarlo	Todd Pletcher	Peachtree Stable	11/16	1:45.19	$100,000
2005	Cat Shaker	Joe Bravo	Craig Callis	William T. Callis	11/16	1:44.49	$100,000
2004	Brass Hat	Jason Lumpkins	William B. Bradley	Fred F. Bradley	11/16	1:44.36	$100,000
2003	Private Gold	Pat Day	Patrick B. Byrne	Mountain Top & R.B & B.J. Lewis	11/16	1:45.43	$100,000
2002	Mr. Mellon	Pat Day	W. Elliott Walden	WinStar Farm	11/16	1:42.80	$100,000
2001	Percy Hope	Jon Court	Anthony Reinstedler	Waterfall Stable	11/16	1:43.40	$100,000
2000	Ronton	Garrett Gomez	Vladimir Cerin	Jaltipan LLC	11/16	1:42.80	$100,000
1999	Yankee Victor	Shane Sellers	Carlos J. Morales	Enllomar Stable	11/16	1:42.80	$75,000
1998	Shot of Gold	Russell Baze	Bob Baffert	Matt Young, et al.	11/16	1:42.40	$75,000
1997	Anet	Chris McCarron	Bob Baffert	Double Diamond Farm	11/16	1:40.60	$75,000
1996	Pugnacious	Shane Sellers	David C. Cross Jr.	Gary M. Garber	11/16	1:43.00	$75,000
1995	Key Guy	Kent Desormeaux	Mark A. Hennig	Team Valor Stables	11/16	1:44.60	$75,000
1994	Oakmont	Pat Day	Neil J. Howard	W. S. Farish III & Oak Cliff Stable	11/16	1:43.40	$60,000
1993	Grand Jewel	Jerry D. Bailey	Neil J. Howard	W. S. Farish III & William S. Kilroy	11/16	1:44.60	$60,000
1992	Dignitas	Julie Krone	George R. Arnold II	John Peace	11/16	1:47.00	$50,000
1991	Wall Street Dancer	Pat Day	Jesus I. Suarez	John D. Gunther	11/16	1:41.40	$37,500
1990	Coax Chad	Perry Ouzts	Arthur J. Zeis	Elmer E. Miller	11/16	1:46.60	$25,000
1989	Arcadia Falls	Pat Day	William R. Helmbrecht	Arcadia Racing Stable	11/16	1:44.00	$25,000
1988	Dee Lance	Gary L. Stevens	Stig T. Rasmussen	Fortune Stable (lessee)	11/16	1:44.40	$30,000
1987	Rampaging Native	Steve Neff	William R. Helmbrecht	Wichita Equine	11/16	1:39.00	$20,000
1986	Best of Rest	Francisco Vidal	Thomas C. Short	Parrish Bros., York & Criswell	11/16	1:38.20	$15,000
