= Rushaway =

American-bred Thoroughbred racehorse

- Sire: Haste
- Grandsire: Maintenant
- Dam: Roseway
- Damsire: Stornoway
- Sex: Gelding
- Foaled: 1933
- Country: United States
- Colour: Black
- Breeder: Joseph E. Widener
- Owner: 1) Joseph E. Widener; 2) Alfred G. Tarn
- Trainer: Alfred G. Tarn
- Record: 107: 17-14-16
- Earnings: US$47,540

Major wins
- Orlando Purse (1936); Illinois Derby (1936); Latonia Derby (1936); Louisiana Derby (1936); Middlesex County Handicap (1936); Marquette Handicap (1937)

Honours
- Rushaway Stakes at Turfway Park

Rushaway (foaled 1933 in Kentucky) was an American Thoroughbred racehorse whose enduring legacy was his two Derby wins on consecutive days in two different states. Owned and trained by Alfred Tarn, in both races, Rushaway was ridden by Tarn's son-in-law, the future National Museum of Racing and Hall of Fame inductee Johnny Longden. On Friday afternoon, May 22, 1936, Rushaway won the Illinois Derby at Aurora Downs in Aurora, Illinois. That night, Tarn shipped the three-year-old gelding three hundred miles south via express train to the Latonia Race Track in Latonia, Kentucky, where on Saturday afternoon he won the Latonia Derby. Rushaway's feat of endurance is still talked about more than eighty years later.

== Background ==
=== Breeding ===
Rushaway was bred by the prominent Thoroughbred owner, breeder and Hialeah Park Race Track proprietor Joseph E. Widener at his Elmendorf Farm in Fayette County, Kentucky. Rushaway's sire was Haste, owned and raced by Widener and trained by Hamilton Keene. His race wins at age two included the 1925 Grand Union Hotel Stakes and the Saratoga Special Stakes. As a three-year-old in 1926, Haste had a third-place finish in the Belmont Stakes then went on to win the Withers Stakes followed by a gutsy win under jockey Earl Sande over Edward Bradley's Bagenbaggage in the inaugural running of the Fairmount Derby. Haste's sire was Maintenant, a French-bred son of William K. Vanderbilt's French champion Maintenon. Sent to the United States as a three-year-old, Maintenant was a powerfully built stallion who stood seventeen hands. A Daily Racing Form article described him as a 'whale'. Maintenant debuted at Aqueduct Racetrack and on July 11, 1915, won a mile race with ease. However, injuries limited his racing career.

Rushaway's dam was Roseway, a daughter of multiple stakes winner Stornoway. Roseway won the 1919 1000 Guineas Stakes, a British Classic race for fillies run over a distance of one mile at Newmarket Racecourse. In the Epsom Oaks, the other Classic for fillies, Roseway ran second to Bayuda. Roseway was sold for breeding usage by her owner/breeder Sir Edward Hulton and in 1925 new owner Joseph Widener brought her to the United States to stand at his Kentucky stud farm.

== 1935: two-year-old season ==
As a two-year-old, Rushaway had limited success on the racetrack. His best result in a stakes race was a third in the six furlong Joliet Handicap at Lincoln Fields Race Track in Crete, Illinois.

== 1936: three-year-old season ==
At age three, Rushaway showed some promise after a win over seven furlongs in the February 18 Orlando Purse at owner Joseph Widener's Hialeah Park. A few weeks later in early March, Alfred Tarn, an English-born trainer from Winnipeg, Manitoba, purchased Rushaway for a price reported to be $10,000. Less than a month later, Rushaway showed his new owner his potential when, on March 29, he broke the track record in winning the mile and one eighth Louisiana Derby at Fair Grounds Race Course in New Orleans. On April 18, Rushaway traveled to Arlington Downs in Arlington, Texas, where he ran second by one length to the Milky Way Farm Stable colt, The Fighter.

=== A "Very Remarkable" and "Unparalleled" racing feat ===
Rushaway's back-to-back wins in a two-day period was and remains a most noteworthy achievement which the Daily Racing Form (DRF) reported was "a feat without known precedent in this country or abroad." The accomplishment was made even more remarkable because Rushaway was carrying top weight in the eight-horse field by three pounds yet won by 6 lengths and did it in a new race record time for the mile-and-a-quarter distance. The DRF pointed out that while many had their concerns about the wisdom of racing the horse in such a manner, everyone agreed that Alfred Tarn was an astute horseman and someone they held in high esteem. Rushaway's victory in Latonia marked his third Derby win of the year.

On June 29, 1936, Rushaway won the Middlesex County Handicap at Suffolk Downsin Boston, Massachusetts.

== 1937 - 1942 ==
As a four-year-old Rushaway continued winning in a fast time, setting a new Lincoln Fields track record of 1:50 flat for 1 1/8 miles in the 1937 Marquette Handicap. Rushaway raced on through 1942 with only moderate success but still retired having finished in the top three forty-seven times in one hundred and seven starts.

== Honors ==
In 1986, marking the fiftieth anniversary of his still unmatched accomplishment, Rushaway had a race named in his honor at the renamed Latonia Race Track.

== Progeny ==
As a gelding, Rushaway could not leave any offspring.

== Pedigree ==
Pedigree of Rushaway
Sire Haste (USA) 1923	Maintenant (FR)	Maintenon (FR)	Le Sagittaire (FR)
Sire Haste (USA) 1923	Maintenant (FR)	Maintenon (FR)	Marcia (GB)
Sire Haste (USA) 1923	Maintenant (FR)	Martha Gorman (USA)	Sir Dixon (USA)
Sire Haste (USA) 1923	Maintenant (FR)	Martha Gorman (USA)	Sallie McClelland (USA)
Sire Haste (USA) 1923	Miss Malaprop (1909)	Meddler (GB)	St. Gatien (GB)
Sire Haste (USA) 1923	Miss Malaprop (1909)	Meddler (GB)	Busybody (GB)
Sire Haste (USA) 1923	Miss Malaprop (1909)	Correction (USA)	Himyar (USA)
Sire Haste (USA) 1923	Miss Malaprop (1909)	Correction (USA)	Mannie Gray (USA)
Dam Roseway (GB) 1916	Stornoway (GB)	Desmond (GB)	St. Simon (Gb)
Dam Roseway (GB) 1916	Stornoway (GB)	Desmond (GB)	L'Abbesse de Jouarre (GB)
Dam Roseway (GB) 1916	Stornoway (GB)	Sisterlike (GB)	Ladas (GB)
Dam Roseway (GB) 1916	Stornoway (GB)	Sisterlike (GB)	Sister Lucy (GB)
Dam Roseway (GB) 1916	Rose of Ayrshire (GB)	Ayrshire (GB)	Hampton (GB)
Dam Roseway (GB) 1916	Rose of Ayrshire (GB)	Ayrshire (GB)	Atalanta (GB)
Dam Roseway (GB) 1916	Rose of Ayrshire (GB)	Pink Flower (GB)	Melton (GB)
Dam Roseway (GB) 1916	Rose of Ayrshire (GB)	Pink Flower (GB)	Saponaria (GB) (Family: 1-s)
