= Charlie Barley =

Canadian Thoroughbred racehorse

- Sire: Affirmed
- Grandsire: Exclusive Native
- Dam: Au Printemps
- Damsire: Dancing Champ
- Foaled: 1986
- Country: Canada
- Colour: Bay
- Owner: John Haney, Scott Abbott
- Record: 24: 10-7-3
- Earnings: $922,943

Major wins
- Colin Stakes (1988); Summer at Woodbine (1988); Woodstock (1989); Toronto Cup (1989); Fort Harrod (1990); Sea o'Erin (1990); Dominion Day (1990)

Honours
- Canadian Champion Male Turf Horse (1989)

Charlie Barley (1986–September 9, 2010) was an American-foaled Canadian thoroughbred racehorse. He won Canadian Champion Male Turf Horse, one of the Sovereign Awards, in 1989. From 24 starts in horse races, Charlie Barley won 10 of them, and finished in the top three 20 times. His wins earned almost a million US dollars.

== Career ==
Charlie Barley was foaled in Kentucky, United States in 1986; his parents were Affirmed and Au Printemps. Affirmed was a distinguished horse as a Triple Crown winner. He was purchased for $50,000 as a two year old and relocated to Canada. Charlie Barley was based out of Caledon, Ontario in the Greater Toronto area of Ontario for the majority of his life and career. He was owned by John Haney and Scott Abbott. Abbott and John's brother Chris Haney were the co-creators of the board game Trivial Pursuit, and Charlie Barley was named after Abbot's young son Charlie of similar age to the horse.

In 1989, Charlie Barley ran eleven races, of which he won four; placed second in four; showed third in two; and came in seventh in one (the Ohio Derby). This earned him the Sovereign Award of Canadian Champion Male Turf Horse for that year. However, Charlie Barley lost to Canadian Triple Crown winner With Approval at both Canadian Champion Three-Year-Old Male Horse and Canadian Horse of the Year, although he came in second place for both those awards (with Sky Classic in third place).

Charlie Barley retired from racing in 1990 while around four years old, a fairly typical age for racehorses to be retired. He went on to sire children including Barlee Mist, Charlie's Dewan, Wings of Erin, and Bo Barley. He died of old age on September 9, 2010.

== Legacy ==
Charlie Barley's owners complimented him as a "super horse." The Charlie Barley Stakes, a horse race held at Woodbine Racetrack that began in 2001, is named after him; it is a race on turf (grass) for three-year olds.
