= Roseway (horse) =

British-bred Thoroughbred racehorse

- Sire: Stornoway
- Grandsire: Desmond
- Dam: Rose of Ayrshire
- Damsire: Ayrshire
- Sex: Mare
- Foaled: 1916
- Country: United Kingdom
- Colour: Brown
- Breeder: Edward Hulton
- Owner: Edward Hulton
- Trainer: Frank Hartigan
- Record: 11: 3-3-0

Major wins
- 1000 Guineas (1919)

Roseway (1916 – 1936) was a British Thoroughbred racehorse and broodmare. She showed promise as a juvenile in 1918 when she won twice and was second twice from seven starts. In the following spring she produced by far her best performance when she won the 1000 Guineas by six lengths. She finished second when odds-on favourite for the Oaks Stakes but ran poorly in two subsequent races and was retired from racing at the end of the year. She had some success as a broodmare both in Britain and in the United States.

== Background ==
Roseway was a brown mare bred and owned by the newspaper proprietor Edward Hulton. She was trained by Frank Hartigan at Weyhill in Hampshire.

Her sire Stornoway was at his best as a two-year-old in 1913 when his wins included the Gimcrack Stakes. He ran only once subsequently and sired Roseway in his first season at stud. Roseway's dam Rose of Ayrshire produced several good broodmares and was the female-line ancestor of the Irish Derby winner Steel Pulse and the Argentinian champion Telescopico.

== Racing career ==
=== 1918: two-year-old season ===
Roseway began her racecourse career at Newmarket Racecourse in June when she won the Home-bred Two-year-old Plate. In the following month at the same track she followed up by taking the Isleham Plate from Sunny Rhyme. Her two wins that summer earned her owner a total of £589. On her return at Newmarket in October she started 15/8 second favourite for the Buckenham Stakes and finished second, beaten a head by Lord Basil, a highly-rated colt from the Alec Taylor, Jr. stable. In the course of the season, Roseway also finished second in the Barton Mills Nursery Handicap and ran unplaced on three occasions.

=== 1919: three-year-old season ===
On 9 May, Roseway started the 2/1 favourite ahead of fourteen opponents for the 106th running of the 1000 Guineas over the Rowley Mile course. Ridden by Albert "Snowy" Whalley she won by six lengths from Britannia with Glaciale a length and a half away in third place. Roseway's winning margin was the second widest of the 20th century, behind only Humble Duty's seven length win in 1970.

Steve Donoghue took the ride when Roseway started the 4/7 favourite for the Oaks Stakes over one and a half miles at Epsom Racecourse on 6 June. She took the lead in the straight but was overtaken inside the final furlong and was beaten one and a half lengths by Bayuda. At Royal Ascot later in June, Roseway was beaten by the King's colt Viceroy in the Waterford Stakes over one mile. In July she started the 8/13 favourite for the Falmouth Stakes at Newmarket but finished last of the five runners behind Tomatina. By the end of July the filly had earned £4,814 in prize money.

Roseway reportedly became "unreliable" in late 1919 and at the end of the year Hulton sold her to Sir George Greenhill who retired her from racing to become a broodmare.

== Assessment and honours ==
In their book, A Century of Champions, based on the Timeform rating system, John Randall and Tony Morris rated Roseway a "poor" winner of the 1000 Guineas.

== Breeding record ==
Roseway produced at least two foals in Britain and at least six more after her export to the United States. Roseway died in 1936.

- Roseola, a black filly, foaled in 1923, sired by Swynford. Dam of Tornado, winner of the Prix Lupin, Prix des Sablons, Prix Jean Prat.
- Heatherway, brown colt, 1924, by Craig an Eran
- Phalara (USA), brown filly, 1926, by Phalaris
- Arbor (USA), chestnut filly, 1930, by Fair Play
- Entwine (USA), bay mare, 1932, by Chance Shot
- Rushaway (USA), black gelding, 1933 by Haste. Won Illinois Derby, Latonia Derby, Louisiana Derby.
- Queen Full (USA), chestnut filly, 1934 by Jack High
- Hard Times (USA), brown colt, 1936 by Sickle

== Pedigree ==
Pedigree of Roseway (GB), brown mare, 1916
Sire Stornoway (GB) 1911	Desmond; 1896	St Simon	Galopin
Sire Stornoway (GB) 1911	Desmond; 1896	St Simon	St Angela
Sire Stornoway (GB) 1911	Desmond; 1896	L'Abbesse de Jouarre	Trappist
Sire Stornoway (GB) 1911	Desmond; 1896	L'Abbesse de Jouarre	Festive
Sire Stornoway (GB) 1911	Sisterlike; 1901	Ladas	Hampton
Sire Stornoway (GB) 1911	Sisterlike; 1901	Ladas	Illuminata
Sire Stornoway (GB) 1911	Sisterlike; 1901	Sister Lucy	St. Gatien
Sire Stornoway (GB) 1911	Sisterlike; 1901	Sister Lucy	Lucy Glitters
Dam Rose of Ayrshire (GB) 1905	Ayrshire; 1885	Hampton	Lord Clifden
Dam Rose of Ayrshire (GB) 1905	Ayrshire; 1885	Hampton	Lady Langden
Dam Rose of Ayrshire (GB) 1905	Ayrshire; 1885	Atalanta	Galopin
Dam Rose of Ayrshire (GB) 1905	Ayrshire; 1885	Atalanta	Feronia
Dam Rose of Ayrshire (GB) 1905	Pink Flower; 1891	Melton	Master Kildae
Dam Rose of Ayrshire (GB) 1905	Pink Flower; 1891	Melton	Violet Melrose
Dam Rose of Ayrshire (GB) 1905	Pink Flower; 1891	Saponaria	The Duke
Dam Rose of Ayrshire (GB) 1905	Pink Flower; 1891	Saponaria	Festival (Family 1-s)

- Roseway was inbred 3 × 4 to Hampton, meaning that this stallion appears in both the third and fourth generations of her pedigree. She was also inbred 4 × 4 to Galopin.
