= Man the Lifeboat =

1987 board game

Man the Lifeboat is a board game published in 1987 by San Serif.

== Contents ==
Man the Lifeboat is a game in which each player controls one lifeboat for inshore rescues and another lifeboat for offshore rescues.

== Publication history ==
San Serif Print Promotions was formed in 1980 to publish games. As noted in Issue 3 of The Games Machine, San Serif first acquired the UK licenses for popular North American games such as Trivial Pursuit, but then in the mid-1980s, began to publish new games such as Seaside Frolics in 1986 and Man the Lifeboat in 1987.

== Reception ==
David Pritchard reviewed Man the Lifeboat for Games International magazine, and stated that "Man the Lifeboat is fast-moving and undemanding, but one feels that it could have been developed into a better game." Pritchard concluded by giving it a below-average score of 2 out of 5.
