= Seaside Frolics =

1986 family board game

Seaside Frolics is a board game published in 1986 by San Serif.

== Contents ==
Seaside Frolics is a game in which players visit Shrimpton-on-Sea, an Edwardian era seaside town, to see as many sights as possible in a limited amount of time, collecting a postcard for each location visited.

== Publication history ==
San Serif Print Promotions was formed in 1980 to publish games. As noted in Issue 3 of The Games Machine, San Serif first acquired the UK licenses for popular North American games such as Trivial Pursuit, but then began to publish new games such as Seaside Frolics in 1986 and Man the Lifeboat in 1987.

== Reception ==
David Pritchard reviewed Seaside Frolics for Games International magazine, and gave it 4 stars out of 5, and stated that "Quibbles? Very few. The different direction arrows take a little getting used to and the board spaces are a trifle small for the tokens, but these discomforts vanish in the splendid nostalgia. Even those humble pennies depict either Edward or Victoria – how's that for realism?"
