= Sea o'Erin Stakes =

- Class: Discontinued Grade 3 stakes
- Location: Arlington Park; Arlington Heights, Illinois, United States
- Inaugurated: 1980
- Race type: Thoroughbred – Flat racing
- Website: www.arlingtonpark.com

Race information
- Distance: 1 mile (8 furlongs)
- Surface: Turf
- Track: Left-handed
- Qualification: Three-year-olds & up
- Weight: Assigned
- Purse: US$100,000

The Sea o'Erin Stakes was American Thoroughbred horse race held annually in early September at Arlington Park racetrack in Arlington Heights, Illinois. A Grade III event open to horses age three and older, it was contested on turf over a distance of one mile (8 furlongs).

Inaugurated in 1980 as the Sea o'Erin Handicap, the race was run at various distances:

- 1 1/8 miles : 1980, 1987
- 1 1/16 miles : 1981–1985

Due to heavy rains, the 1996 race was switched from the turf course to the main dirt track.

There was no race run in 1986, 1988, 1995, and 1997–2000.

== Records ==
Speed record:

- 1:34.93 – First And Only (1994)

Most wins:

- No horse has won this race more than once.

Most wins by an owner:

- 2 – Team Block (2002, 2005)

Most wins by a jockey:

- 2 – Pat Day (1980, 1981)
- 2 – Aaron Gryder (1994, 1996)

Most wins by a trainer:

- 2 – Chris M. Block (2002, 2005)

== Winners ==
Year	Winner	Age	Jockey	Trainer	Owner	Time
2012	Nikki's Sandcastle	5	Diego Sanchez	David Kassen	Richard Sherman	1:43.38
2010	2011	Race not held				
2009	Public Speaker	4	Junior Alvarado	Dale Bennett	Peter J. Kalahalios	1:35.04
2008	Karelian	6	James Graham	George R. Arnold II	Richard Masson	1:36.37
2007	Spotsgone	4	Earlie Fires	William Fires	Robert Yagos	1:38.10
2006	Therecomesatiger	4	Mark Guidry	Thomas F. Proctor	Charles R. Patton	1:37.15
2005	Fort Prado	4	Eddie Razo Jr.	Chris M. Block	Team Block	1:36.18
2004	Herculated	4	Carlos H. Marquez Jr.	Mike Stidham	Oak Crest Farm	1:36.48
2003	Rock Slide	5	Robby Albarado	Neil J. Howard	W. Farish/ J. Elkins/ W.T. Webber Jr.	1:35.85
2002	Mystery Giver	4	René Douglas	Chris M. Block	Team Block	1:38.17
2001	Intern	5	Eddie Martin Jr.	Louie Roussel III	Louie Roussel III	1:35.73
1997	2001	Race not held				
1996	Jambalaya Jazz	4	Aaron Gryder	John T. Ward Jr.	John C. Oxley	1:36.57
1995	Race not held					
1994	First And Only	7	Aaron Gryder	Walter Bindner Jr.	Mason C. Rudd	1:34.93
1993	Journalism	5	Shane Sellers	Wallace Dollase	Richard Stephen	1:36.35
1992	Lotus Pool	5	Charles Woods Jr.	Burke Kessinger Jr.	Yoshiki Akazawa	1:35.12
1991	Roscius	4	Francisco Torres	Harvey L. Vanier	Nancy Vanier & Dr. Louis Aitken	1:37.64
1990	Charlie Barley	4	Robin Platts	Grant Pearce	King Caledon Farms	1:36.60
1989	Set a Record	5	Patrick Johnson	Steven Penrod	Hermitage Farm	1:37.20
1988	Race not held					
1987	New Colony	4	Heriberto Valdivieso	Charlie Stutts	Sonny Lou Stable	1:48.80
1986	Race not held					
1985	Sari's Baba	5	Brent Bullard	N. Calvin Moore	N. Calvin Moore	1:43.00
1984	Jack Slade	4	Gerland Gallitano	David Kassen	Andrew Adams	1:42.40
1983	Dom Cimarosa	4	Juvenal Diaz	J. Bert Sonnier	Charles E. Schmidt Jr.	1:44.20
1982	Parcel	4	Michael R. Morgan	Carl Nafzger	Tartan Stable	1:43.40
1981	Summer Advocate	4	Pat Day	Mike Ball	Don Ball	1:47.60
1980	Rossi Gold	4	Pat Day	Ray Lawrence Jr.	Leslie Combs II & Frank McMahon	1:52.20
