= American Lion (horse) =

American-bred Thoroughbred racehorse

- Sire: Tiznow
- Grandsire: Cee's Tizzy
- Dam: Storm Tide
- Damsire: Storm Cat
- Sex: Colt
- Foaled: 2007
- Country: United States
- Colour: Chestnut
- Breeder: WinStar Farm
- Owner: WinStar Farm, Casner Racing
- Trainer: Eoin Harty
- Record: 9: 3-1-1
- Earnings: $417,800

Major wins
- Hollywood Prevue Stakes (2009); Illinois Derby (2010

American Lion (Foaled February 10, 2007) is an American Thoroughbred racehorse and former stallion. A graded stakes winner, he was a contender in the 2010 Kentucky Derby. However, he did not finish in the money.

== Background and family ==
American Lion, a bay horse, is sired by Horse of the Year, Tiznow, who is the only horse to date to win the Breeders' Cup Classic twice. He is out of the mare Storm Tide, a daughter of Storm Cat.

He was owned by WinStar Farm during most his racing career, and was also bred by them in partnership with Dr. William Lockridge. He was later owned by Casner Racing, the personal stable of Bill Casner, a partner of Winstar Farm.

== Racing career ==
American Lion finished second in his debut race as a juvenile in 2009, and broke his maiden in his second start. He went on to win the Grade 3 Hollywood Prevue Stakes to close out his season.

As a three-year-old, American Lion was second in the Grade 2 Robert B. Lewis Stakes and fourth in the San Felipe Stakes.

He then won the Grade 3 Illinois Derby for his second graded stakes victory. After the Illinois Derby, he contested the 2010 Kentucky Derby, finishing 11th.

American Lion was initially retired from racing, and spent a year away before returning to the track in 2011. He finished fourth in his return race in June of that year, and made his final start afterwards in the Wickerr Stakes, finishing 10th.

== Retirement ==
American Lion retired to stud in 2012 at Darby Dan Farm in Lexington, Kentucky, where he stood for five years until being relocated to River Oaks Farm in Sulphur, Oklahoma in 2017.

American Lion found little success as a stallion, with his best runner being Extinct Charm, a graded-stakes placed stakes winner.

American Lion was slated to be sold in the 2018 Keeneland November Sale as a stallion prospect, but was withdrawn after falling ill. “He came in with a little bit of a temperature, which is not unusual for horses shipping a distance, but very soon he was going downhill very rapidly,” recalls Tony Lacy of Four Star Sales, the consignor of American Lion. “We called Hagyard [Equine Medical Institute], and Luke Fallon and his staff came out. The horse had severe pneumonia, with some really significant side-effects. We knew, at that point, we had to get the horse into the hospital. He was very ill, very quickly. The conversation was no longer will the horse be able to return to the sale. It was basically will he make it?”

Through the aid of many veterinarians and the donations of veterinary workers, American Lion recovered from his illness. Breeder and former owner WinStar Farm housed American Lion during recovery.

American Lion was pensioned from stud duty and gelded, and was retrained for second career through New Vocations, a retirement facility dedicated to the retraining of retired racehorses.
