= Deputy Commander (horse) =

American-bred Thoroughbred racehorse

- Sire: Deputy Minister
- Grandsire: Vice Regent
- Dam: Anka Germania
- Damsire: Malinowski
- Sex: Stallion
- Foaled: 1994
- Country: United States
- Colour: Dark Bay
- Breeder: Crystal Springs Farm
- Owner: Horizon Stable
- Trainer: Wallace Dollase
- Record: 13: 4-3-2
- Earnings: $1,906,640

Major wins
- Affirmed Handicap (1997); Super Derby (1997); Travers Stakes (1997)
- Last updated on May 22, 2007

Deputy Commander (foaled in 1994 in Kentucky – October 7, 2009) was an American Thoroughbred racehorse.

== Background ==
Bred by Crystal Springs Farm near Paris, Kentucky, he was a son of North American Champion sire Deputy Minister and out of the Grade 1-winning turf mare, Anka Germania who captured the 1988 Sword Dancer Invitational over subsequent Eclipse-winning turf horse Sunshine Forever. He was sold by Denali Stud as a weanling at the November 1995 Keeneland Sales to Horizon Stable, a partnership put together by trainer Wallace Dollase.

== Racing career ==
A late developer, Deputy Commander never made it to the 1997 Kentucky Derby. However, by autumn he had matured into a powerful colt who won the Travers Stakes and the Super Derby before running second to Skip Away in the 1997 Breeders' Cup Classic at Hollywood Park Racetrack.

== Stud record ==
After being retired from racing, Deputy Commander stood at stud in Kentucky at Stonerside Stable and Airdrie Stud, and in 2007 stood at stud at Ballena Vista Farm in Ramona, California. Among his progeny are Grab Your Heart and Deputy Glitters as well as Ten Most Wanted, who followed in his sire's footsteps by winning both the Travers Stakes and the Super Derby.

Due to a decline in his physiological and neurological health, he was euthanized October 7, 2009.
