= Super Derby =

- Class: non-Graded
- Location: Louisiana Downs; Bossier City, Louisiana, USA
- Inaugurated: 1980
- Race type: Thoroughbred – Flat racing
- Website: ladowns.com

Race information
- Distance: 1 1/8 miles
- Surface: Dirt
- Track: Left-handed
- Qualification: Three-year-olds
- Weight: Colt/Gelding: 126 lbs Filly 121 lbs.
- Purse: US$250,000 (2023)

The Super Derby is an American thoroughbred horse race held annually in September at Louisiana Downs in Bossier City, Louisiana.

Inaugurated in 1980, the Super Derby is open to three-year-olds and the distance is 1 1/8 miles on the dirt. It is the richest race held at Louisiana Downs. In its history, the Super Derby has attracted some of the top horses in the country including winners of all three American Classic Races.

The Super Derby was a Grade I race from 1983 to 2001. In 2002, it was downgraded to Grade II and in 2016, it was downgraded again to Grade III. It was originally run at the American classic distance of 1 1/4 miles, but in 2002 the distance was reduced to 1 1/8 miles (the exception being 2005 when the distance reverted to 1 1/4 miles). In 2017 the distance was set at 1 1/16 miles.

In summary:

In 2017, the Super Derby lost its graded status and changed surfaces from dirt to turf. "Today, there are a lot fewer 3-year-old races on the grass. We want our key race to have the best and largest field we can put out there, and making the move to the turf, there's an opportunity to have a better overall quality field", stated Trent McIntosh, the assistant general manager of Louisiana Downs. The race was later moved back to the dirt and run at 1 1/8 miles on the dirt as of 2023

- 1 1/8 miles – 2002–2004, 2006–2016, 2023 - present
- 1 1/4 miles – 1980–2001, 2005
- 1 1/16 miles – 2017-2019
- Dirt – 1980–2016, 2018-2019, 2023 - present
- Turf – 2017

The 2020 Super Derby, what was to be the 40th running, was canceled due to the COVID-19 pandemic.

In 2023 the event resumed as a Black-type event.

== Records ==
Speed record:

- 1:48.36 – My Pal Charlie (2008) (at 1 1/8 miles)
- 1:59.84 – Tiznow (2000) (at 1 1/4 miles)
- 1:42.91 – Mr. Misunderstood (2017) (at 1 1/16 miles)

Most wins by a jockey:

- 3 – Eddie Maple (1980, 1985, 1986),
- 3 – Laffit Pincay, Jr. (1981, 1983, 1984)
- 3 – Chris McCarron (1987, 1997, 2000)

Most wins by a trainer:

- 3 – Albert Stall Jr. (2008, 2010, 2013)

Most wins by an owner:

- 2 – Russell L. Reineman Stables (1986, 1990)

== Winners ==
Year	Winner	Jockey	Trainer	Owner	Time
2025	Instant Replay	Timothy Thornton	Brad H. Cox	Wathnan Racing	1:50.78
2024	Uno Mas Bourbon	Francisco Arrieta	Ian Wilkes	Bourbon Lane Stables & Six Column Stables, LLC	1:51.02
2023	Big Data	Emisael Jaramillo	Michael Lerman	Petal Power Racing Stable	1:51.83
2019	Rotation	Richard Eramia	Steve Asmussen	Winchell Thoroughbreds	1:43.70
2018	Limation	Diego Saenz	Steve Asmussen	Michael Langford	1:43.91
2017 †	Mr. Misunderstood	Chris Rosier	Brad H. Cox	Flurry Racing Stables LLC	1:42.91
2016	Texas Chrome	Charles J. McMahon	J. R. Caldwell	Keene Thoroughbreds	1:49.87
2015	Mobile Bay	Edgar S. Prado	Victor Arceneaux	Tigertail Ranch	1:50.83
2014	Vicar's in Trouble	Rosie Napravnik	Michael Maker	Kenneth L. and Sarah K. Ramsey	1:50.38
2013	Departing	Robby Albarado	Albert Stall Jr.	Claiborne Farm/Dilschneider	1:50.08
2012	Bourbon Courage	Leandro R. Goncalves	Kellyn Gorder	Bourbon Lane Stable/Lynn	1:51.40
2011	Prayer for Relief	Rafael Bejarano	Bob Baffert	Zayat Stables	1:52.29
2010	Apart	Jesse M. Campbell	Albert Stall Jr.	Adele B. Dilschneider	1:52.31
2009	Regal Ransom	Richard Migliore	Saeed bin Suroor	Godolphin Stables	1:49.63
2008	My Pal Charlie	Curt Bourque	Albert Stall Jr.	B. Wayne Hughes	1:48.36
2007	Going Ballistic	Cliff Berry	Donnie K. Von Hemel	Kindred Thoroughbreds LLC	1:50.32
2006	Strong Contender	Robby Albarado	John T. Ward, Jr.	John C. Oxley	1:48.60
2005	The Daddy	Pablo Morales	Salvador Gonzalez	Greg Norman	2:03.15
2004	Fantasticat	Gerard Melancon	Bobby C. Barnett	R Bar S Thoroughbreds	1:51.40
2003	Ten Most Wanted	Pat Day	Wallace Dollase	J. Paul Reddam et al.	1:50.77
2002	Essence of Dubai	Jorge F. Chavez	Saeed bin Suroor	Godolphin Racing	1:49.43
2001	Outofthebox	Lonnie Meche	Bernard S. Flint	Richard Klein et al.	2:06.20
2000	Tiznow	Chris McCarron	Jay M. Robbins	M. Cooper & C. Straub-Rubens	1:59.84
1999	Ecton Park	Alex Solis	W. Elliott Walden	Mark H. Stanley	2:00.59
1998	Arch	Corey Nakatani	Frank L. Brothers	Claiborne & A. B.Dilschneider	2:01.20
1997	Deputy Commander	Chris McCarron	Wallace Dollase	Horizon Stable	2:01.20
1996	Editor's Note	Gary Stevens	D. Wayne Lukas	Overbrook Farm	2:02.10
1995	Mecke	Jerry Bailey	Emanuel Tortora	James Lewis Jr.	2:00.10
1994	Soul of the Matter	Kent Desormeaux	Richard Mandella	Burt Bacharach	2:03.20
1993	Wallenda	Herb McCauley	Frank A. Alexander	Dogwood Stable	2:02.30
1992	Senor Tomas	Aaron Gryder	Peter M. Vestal	Thomas Carey	2:04.00
1991	Free Spirit's Joy	Calvin Borel	Clarence Picou	John Lane et al.	2:00.40
1990	Home At Last	Jerry Bailey	Carl Nafzger	R. L. Reineman Stables	2:02.00
1989	Sunday Silence	Pat Valenzuela	Charlie Whittingham	H-G-W Partners	2:03.10
1988	Seeking The Gold	Pat Day	C. R. McGaughey III	Ogden Phipps	2:03.40
1987	Alysheba	Chris McCarron	Jack Van Berg	Dorothy & Pamela Scharbauer	2:03.10
1986	Wise Times	Eddie Maple	Phil Gleaves	R. L. Reineman Stables	2:04.00
1985	Creme Fraiche	Eddie Maple	Woody Stephens	Brushwood Stables	2:02.40
1984	Gate Dancer	Laffit Pincay Jr.	Jack Van Berg	Kenneth Opstein	2:00.10
1983	Sunny's Halo	Laffit Pincay Jr.	David C. Cross Jr.	David J. Foster Stable	2:01.30
1982	Reinvested	Jorge Velásquez	Lefty Nickerson	Harbor View Farm	2:01.30
1981	Island Whirl	Laffit Pincay Jr.	D. Wayne Lukas	Elcee-H Stable	2:03.10
1980	Temperence Hill	Eddie Maple	Joseph B. Cantey	Loblolly Stable	2:06.30

- † Race run on turf.
