= Turf Paradise Derby =

- Class: Ungraded
- Location: Turf Paradise; Phoenix, Arizona
- Inaugurated: 1986
- Race type: Thoroughbred – Flat racing
- Website: turfparadise.com

Race information
- Distance: 1 1/16 miles (8.5 furlongs)
- Surface: Dirt
- Track: Left-handed
- Qualification: Three-year-olds
- Weight: Assigned
- Purse: $75,000

The Turf Paradise Derby is an American Thoroughbred horse race held annually between early and mid February at Turf Paradise Race Course in Phoenix, Arizona. The race is open to three-year-old horses and is competed over a distance of one and one-sixteenth miles on the dirt. It is an ungraded stakes race that is a prep for the Kentucky Derby, although it does not offer Derby qualifying points.

Inaugurated in 1986, the Turf Paradise Derby was run at a distance of one mile but the following year was modified to its present distance of one and one-sixteenth miles.

== Records ==
Speed record:

- 1:41.72 – Startac (2001)

Most wins by a jockey:

- 3 – Scott Stevens (1993, 2006, 2017)

Most wins by a trainer:

- 5 – Doug Oliver (1989, 1990, 1991, 1992, 1995)

Most wins by an owner:

- 2 – Alice Mettler (1989, 1990)
- 2 – Allen Burdick, Arnulf Ueland & Rebbeca Ueland (1991, 1992)
- 2 – Dennis E. Weir (1996, 1999)

== Winners of the Turf Paradise Derby ==
Year	Winner	Jockey	Trainer	Owner	Time
2026	Independent Rise	Guillermo Rodriguez	Robertino Diodoro	Steve Regan, Sheila Regan & Norman Tremblay	1:42.16
2025	Bodi Zafa	Carlos Montalvo	Wade Rodrick	George Todaro	1:42.58
2024	E J Won The Cup	Armando Ayuso	Doug O'Neill	Superfecta King Stable	1:43.80
2023	American Blaze	Karlo Lopez	Clay Brinson	Terry Hamilton & Murray House	1:45.54
2022	Chrome King	Enrique Garcia	Miguel L. Hernandez	Stable H.M.A.	1:44.11
2021	It's My House	Glenn Corbett	Jamey Thomas	Larry M. Katz	1:45.05
2020	Swagsational	Kassie Gulielmino	Heath Lawrence	Keith Swagerty	1:46.50
2019	Senor Friday	Francisco Arrieta	Robertino Diodoro	Charles Garvey	1:44.44
2018	Primo Touch	Andrew Ramgeet	Dan McFarlane	Dino Bates	1:44.30
2017	Howdy Kingkowboy	Scott Stevens	Molly Pearson	Turner Shiew	1:43.95
2016	Nightly News	David Lopez	Dan McFarlane	Hal J. Earnhardt III	1:44.86
2015	Why Two	Aaron T. Gryder	Michael Machowsky	Kagele Brothers	1:44.39
2014	Lotsa Mischief	Skyler Whiteshield	Dan McFarlane	Filippo Santoro, William Mathews, & Marvin Fleming	1:45.50
2013	Persuasive Paul	Joe Steiner	Doug O'Neill	John Fuller	1:44.16
2012	Taylors Deal	Mario Gutierrez	Sandi Gann	North American Thoroughbred Racing Company	1:43.82
2011	Beer Meister	Glenn Corbett	Manuel Ortiz	William A. Burns, Jim Egger, & Val-U Chem, Inc.	1:44.99
2010	Dixie Commander	Wilson Dieguez	Steven Miyadi	Blue Gate Corp. and Steve Miyadi	1:45.97
2009	Mayor Marv	David Flores	Bob Baffert	Michael E. Pegram	1:43.23
2008	Nikki’sgoldensteed	Jon Court	Robert Hess Jr.	Matthew Lomas & Gary D. Spenser	1:42.81
2007	Tie Rod	Juan G. Rivera	Joe Johnson	John Pendergast & Joseph E. Johnson	1:43.91
2006	Keagan	Scott Stevens	Scott Kruljac	Gary Olson, Randy Bafus, Gary Stevenson & Eric J. Kruljac	1:43.90
2005	General John B	Jon Court	Roger Stein	Ross McLeod	1:45.48
2004	Mambo Train	Emile Ramsammy	Marcelo Polanco	Everest Stables	1:42.07
2003	Robledo	David Flores	Vladimir Cerin	Push Push Stables	1:41.74
2002	Captain Squire	Chance Rollins	Donald Mills	Jeff Diener & Robert Bone	1:41.76
2001	Startac	Alex Solis	Simon Bray	Allen E Paulson	1:41.72
2000	Gilty Moment	Luis H. Jauregui	Richard Mandella	Diamond A Racing	1:42.60
1999	Eagleton	Isaias Enriquez	Kevin Lewis	Dennis E. Weir	1:47:80
1998	Availability	Garrett Gomez	Walter Greenman	Winchell Thoroughbreds	1:44.20
1997	White Hot	Danny Sorenson	Kathy Walsh	Clara Dolan & John F. Duggan	1:44.40
1996	Bombay	Sandi L. Gann	Kevin Lewis	Jim Weir & Dennis E. Weir	1:44.20
1995	Speed Predicted	Jake Barton	Doug Oliver	Karen Underwood & Wayne Underwood	1:43.40
1994	Screaming Don	Joey Castro	Lanny Sharp	Tom Said, Don Heim & Lanny Sharp	1:42.00
1993	Smokin Albert	Scott Stevens	Zenon Lipowicz	Phon Sutton	1:42.60
1992	Wavering Scene	Tim Masters	Doug Oliver	Allen Burdick, Arnulf Ueland & Rebbeca Ueland	1:48.40
1991	Honor the Hero	Tim Masters	Doug Oliver	Allen Burdick, Arnulf Ueland & Rebbeca Ueland	1:44.80
1990	Axe Age	Alfredo Guerrero	Doug Oliver	Alice Mettler	1:42.60
1989	Stalixis	Alfredo Guerrero	Doug Oliver	Alice Mettler	1:44.60
1988	Art's Angel	Darrel McHargue	Neil French	Robert Walker & Bonnie Walker	1:44.20
1987	Three Phase	Carl Kutz	Bart Hone	Sky Hi Stable	1:43.60
1986	Chuck N Luck	Kenneth Hare	Creed Botts	Donald Baldwin	1:36.40
