= Jon Court =

American jockey

Personal information
- Born: November 26, 1960 (age 65) Gainesville, Florida, U.S.
- Occupation: Jockey

Horse racing career
- Sport: Horse racing
- Career wins: 4,000+

Major racing wins
- West Virginia Derby (1998); Golden Rod Stakes (1999, 2001); All Along Stakes (2001); Silverbulletday Stakes (2002); Indiana Derby (2002, 2003); Japan Cup Dirt (2003); Citation Handicap (2004, 2007); Clement L. Hirsch Handicap (2004); Sunshine Millions Filly & Mare Turf (2004, 2005); Frank E. Kilroe Mile Handicap (2005); Lone Star Park Handicap (2005); Lone Star Derby (2001); Sport Page Breeders' Cup Handicap (2005); Buena Vista Handicap (2005); Turf Paradise Derby (2005, 2008); Bing Crosby Handicap (2006); La Brea Stakes (2006); Santa Margarita Handicap (2006); San Luis Rey Handicap (2006); Providencia Stakes (2007); Tokyo City Cup (2008); Turfway Park Fall Championship (2009, 2010); Arkansas Derby (2010, 2011); Rebel Stakes (2013); Remington Springboard Mile Stakes (2015)

Racing awards
- George Woolf Memorial Jockey Award (2007)

Significant horses
- Archarcharch, Fleetstreet Dancer, Nite Light, Leroidesanimaux, Percy Hope, Perfect Drift, Will Take Charge

Jon Kenton Court (born November 26, 1960, in Gainesville, Florida) is a retired American jockey in Thoroughbred horse racing.

Having grown up in Florida, Jon Court began riding in Colorado at the now closed Centennial Park in 1980. He rode in Louisiana for 12 years before moving to Kentucky and Indiana in 1995, where he was a top rider at Hoosier Park from 1996 to 1998. In 1999, he gained his 2,000th win at Kentucky Downs.

In 2001, he rode Percy Hope in the Lone Star Derby, winning, and in the Preakness Stakes, placing 9th. In 2003, he won the Japan Cup Dirt on Fleetstreet Dancer as a 48-1 longshot.

In 2004, he moved to California tracks on the advice of trainer Doug O'Neill after winning titles at Ellis Park Racecourse, Oaklawn Park, Turfway Park, Kentucky Downs, and Birmingham Racecourse. He rode his 3,000th winner at Santa Anita Park on April 7, 2005, 25 years to the day from his first win.

In 2006, Court was elected secretary of the Jockeys' Guild and is the Guild's representative board member for the National Thoroughbred Racing Association's (NTRA) Charities-Permanently Disabled Jockeys' Fund.

Court, who has been called "an unfailingly polite man" by ESPN, received the prestigious George Woolf Memorial Jockey Award in February 2007. The award is voted on by American jockeys and is given to a jockey who demonstrates high standards of personal and professional conduct, on and off the racetrack.

Court was one of the jockeys featured in the first season of Animal Planet's 2009 reality documentary Jockeys before he moved his tack back to Kentucky.

On April 10, 2010, Court won the $1,000,000 Arkansas Derby aboard Line of David, giving the horse and its connections enough graded stakes earnings to run in the Kentucky Derby. However, Court was removed from the Derby mount by the horse's trainer, John Sadler. Line of David subsequently finished 18th in the 20-horse Derby field.

Court repeated his win in the Arkansas Derby in 2011 with Archarcharch, trained by his father-in-law, Jinks Fires. He retained the mount for the 2011 Kentucky Derby. Archarcharch drew the first post and finished 15th in a 19-horse field at 12-1 odds.

Court was injured in a fall on May 3, 2014, breaking his hand. He did not return to the track until late September.

On December 3, 2016, Court earned his 4,000th win aboard City Without Pity at Turfway Park. He had suffered three broken vertebrae and two broken ribs on September 16 when his mount clipped heals with another horse.

== Retirement ==
Court retired from riding in May 2024. His final mount was at Oaklawn Park aboard League of Legends on May 5. Following his retirement, Court worked in the real estate and construction industries. In October 2026, it was announced that Court would be employed by Oaklawn Park as an integrity official.

== Year-end charts ==
Chart (2000–present)	Rank
National Earnings List for Jockeys 2000	39
National Earnings List for Jockeys 2001	24
National Earnings List for Jockeys 2002	29
National Earnings List for Jockeys 2003	56
National Earnings List for Jockeys 2004	42
National Earnings List for Jockeys 2005	21
National Earnings List for Jockeys 2006	20
National Earnings List for Jockeys 2007	62
National Earnings List for Jockeys 2009	67
National Earnings List for Jockeys 2010	88
National Earnings List for Jockeys 2011	60
National Earnings List for Jockeys 2012	66
National Earnings List for Jockeys 2013	71
National Earnings List for Jockeys 2013	171
National Earnings List for Jockeys 2015	103
