= Lone Star Derby =

- Class: Ungraded stakes
- Location: Lone Star Park; Grand Prairie, Texas
- Inaugurated: 1997
- Race type: Thoroughbred - Flat racing
- Website: www.lonestarpark.com

Race information
- Distance: 1 1/16 miles (8.5 furlongs)
- Surface: Turf
- Track: Left-handed
- Qualification: Three-year-olds
- Weight: Assigned
- Purse: $200,000

The Lone Star Derby is an American flat Thoroughbred horse race for three-year-olds held annually at Lone Star Park in Grand Prairie, Texas. It is currently an Ungraded stakes race run over a distance of 8.5 furlongs on turf.

Inaugurated in 1997 as an ungraded stakes race, it was elevated to Grade III status in 2002. The race was downgraded by the American Graded Stakes Committee (AGSC) and lost its graded status in 2011. Lone Star Park officials moved the race from dirt to turf for the first time after the AGSC decision and moved it to Lone Star Park's special Memorial Day program dubbed Lone Star Million Day.

For the three years from 2001 through 2003, it was raced at 1 1/8 miles.

== Records ==
Speed record:

- 1:40.88 - Anet (1997)

Largest margin of victory:

- 4 3/4 lengths - Wanna Runner (2006)

Most wins by a jockey (tie):

- 2 - Jon Court (2001, 2005)
- 2 - Victor Espinoza (2006, 2009)

Most wins by a trainer:

- 4 - Bob Baffert (1997, 2006, 2009, 2010)

Most wins by an owner:

- As of 2007, no owner has won this race more than once.

Purses

- As of 2010, the purse was lowered to $200,000. It was set at $400,000 for 2008 & 2009.

== Winners of the Lone Star Derby ==
| Year | Winner | Jockey | Trainer | Owner | Time |
|---|---|---|---|---|---|
| 2011 | Thirtyfirststreet | Chris Landeros | Doug O'Neill | Gorman/Haymes/Bogart | 1:42.55 |
| 2010 | Game On Dude | Martin Garcia | Bob Baffert | Lanni Family Trust/Mercedes Stable | 1:44.61 |
| 2009 | Mythical Power | Victor Espinoza | Bob Baffert | Peachtree Stable | 1:42.79 |
| 2008 | El Gato Malo | Rafael Bejarano | Craig Dollase | West Point Thoroughbreds | 1:43.04 |
| 2007 | Slew's Tizzy | Robby Albarado | Gregory Fox | LaCombe Stable | 1:45.49 |
| 2006 | Wanna Runner | Victor Espinoza | Bob Baffert | Michael E. Pegram | 1:43.71 |
| 2005 | Southern Africa | Jon Court | Michael Puhich | Al & Saundra Kirkwood | 1:41.92 |
| 2004 | Pollard's Vision | John Velazquez | Todd A. Pletcher | Edgewood Farm | 1:42.10 |
| 2003 | Dynever | Edgar Prado | Christophe Clement | C. Willis / P. Karches | 1:50.43 |
| 2002 | Wiseman's Ferry | Jorge Chavez | Niall O'Callaghan | Morton Fink et al. | 1:49.92 |
| 2001 | Percy Hope | Jon Court | Anthony Reinstedler | Waterfalls Stable | 1:50.27 |
| 2000 | Tahkodha Hills | Eibar Coa | Ralph Ziadie | Centuar Farms Inc. | 1:44.05 |
| 1999 | TB Track Star | Eddie Martin, Jr. | Chris Candies | Kevin Candies et al. | 1:42.92 |
| 1998 | Smolderin Heart | Tim Doocy | Terry Brennan | Jeff Rand | 1:46.29 |
| 1997 | Anet | David Flores | Bob Baffert | Donald Dizney | 1:40.88 |
