= Bill Hartack Memorial Handicap =

Horse race in USA

The Bill Hartack Memorial Handicap is an American Thoroughbred horse race run at Hawthorne Race Course in Stickney/Cicero, Illinois in the early spring of the year. The ungraded stakes race is for horses three-year-olds and older, and is set at a distance of one and one-eighth of a mile. The race offers a purse of $200,000.

In 2009, the race was downgraded from a Grade III event to ungraded status, but as of 2015 had once again been awarded Grade III status.

Formerly known as the National Jockey Club Handicap, the race was inaugurated as the Bill Hartack Memorial Handicap in 2008 to honor the Hall of Fame jockey Bill Hartack who died in November 2007. Hartack won the Kentucky Derby fives times: 1957 on Iron Liege, 1960 on Venetian Way, 1962 on Decidedly, 1964 on Northern Dancer, and 1969 on Majestic Prince.

(In 2000, 2001 and 2002, the race was held at Sportsman's Park Racetrack in Cicero, Illinois.)

== Past winners ==
- 2008 - Ryan's for Real (Erick Rodriguez)

== Winners as the National Jockey Club Handicap (partial list) ==
- 2007 - Master Command (John R. Velazquez)
- 2006 - Three Hour Nap (Francisco Torres)
- 2005 - Pollard's Vision (John Velazquez)
- 2004 - Ten Most Wanted (David Flores)
- 2003 - Fight for Ally
- 2002 - Hail the Chief (Jorge Chavez)
- 2001 - Chicago Six
- 2000 - Take Note of Me
- 1999 - Baytown
- 1947 - Take Wing
