= Scott Abbott =

Canadian game designer

- Born: Charles Scott Abbott; Montreal, Quebec, Canada
- Education: Bishop's College School, McGill University, University of Tennessee, master’s degree, journalism, 1978
- Occupations: Sports journalist Board game inventor Racehorse owner
- Known for: Trivial Pursuit; Owner of the North Bay Battalion franchise

Charles Scott Abbott is the co-inventor of the board game Trivial Pursuit along with Chris Haney. Abbott is the owner of the North Bay Battalion hockey team of the Ontario Hockey League. For his work in building this hockey club, he was inducted into the Brampton Sports Hall of Fame in 2005.

Born in Montreal, Quebec, Abbott was a sports journalist for Canadian Press before creating Trivial Pursuit. After his success in board games, he acquired a taste for horse racing. He named one of his star horses, Charlie Barley, after his son Charlie, who was of a similar age to the horse. He owns C. Scott Abbott Racing Stable Ltd. Its horse Smart Sky finished seventh in the 2010 Queen's Plate.
