= Turf Paradise Race Course =

Horse racetrack in Phoenix, Arizona

- Interactive map of Turf Paradise Race Course
- Location: Phoenix, Arizona
- Coordinates: 33.6348°N 112.0925°W
- Owned by: Jerry Simms
- Date opened: January 7, 1956
- Race type: Thoroughbred and Quarter horse

Turf Paradise is a thoroughbred and quarter horse racetrack located at 19th Avenue and Bell Road, in the Deer Valley section of Phoenix, Arizona. It opened in 1956.

Turf Paradise is typically open for racing from early November through April. It hosts the Turf Paradise Derby for three-year-olds in February, a prep race for the Kentucky Derby (although the race does not offer any qualifying points).

Turf Paradise is owned by local entrepreneur Jerry Simms, along with several partners. As of 2025 it is operated by real estate businessman Gary Hartunian, who entered into a leasing agreement with Simms. The track had faced redevelopment after a real estate company entered into a purchase agreement in April 2023, which later fell through.

== History ==
Businessman Walter Cluer announced plans to construct Turf Paradise in February 1954, originally near the present 56th Street and Shea Boulevard. The following month, after local opposition, he announced that the site would change to what is now Bell Road and 19th Avenue. 1,400 acres (5.7 km^{2}) of land was purchased for the racetrack, which opened for business on January 7, 1956.

A turf course was added in 1980, and in the 1990s the track moved into off-track betting. In 1994, Turf Paradise was purchased by the owners of the Hollywood Park Racetrack.

In January 2000, Hollywood Park signed a letter of intent to sell Turf Paradise to real estate investor Jerry Simms. Upon his acquisition of the racetrack, Simms began renovations including an updated Clubhouse and Turf Club, as well as a new state-of-the-art equine training pool.

In April 2023 it was announced that California-based CT Realty had entered into an agreement to purchase the Turf Paradise property for redevelopment, with closing expected sometime during the summer. At the time of the announcement, an executive at the Arizona Horsemen's Benevolent and Protective Association said his members were told that racing at Turf Paradise would continue between one and three more years while surrounding land is redeveloped. In September 2023, Turf Paradise announced that the racetrack property, and all of its off-track-betting locations in Arizona, would cease operations in October. Later that month, it was reported that the sale of the Turf Paradise property had fallen through and that Jerry Simms found a new buyer to purchase the racetrack with the intention of continuing live racing. The Arizona Racing Commission was informed that Turf Paradise was expected to resume live racing in January 2024 under the new ownership. Before live racing resumed at the end of January 2024, Simms told the Arizona Racing Commission that a sale of the track had fallen through again. Turf Paradise continued to race, and ended their 2024-2025 racing season with what they said was the lowest racing fatality rate in their history, according to metrics collected by the Horseracing Integrity and Safety Authority.

In September 2025, California horse owner and real estate businessman Gary Hartunian reached an agreement with Simms to lease the Turf Paradise property and its 38 off-track betting parlors for a minimum of two years, with an option to extend for an additional three years. The deal was brokered by Hartunian along with Tom Ludt, the former president of Santa Anita Park who was named Turf Paradise's new general manager.

In October 2026, it was reported that Ludt had quit his position as Turf Paradise general manager over philosophical differences with Hartunian. Other personnel, including the assistant general manager and track superintendents, had also departed. On October 16, Arizona state regulators announced that they had suspended the parimutuel wagering permit of Hartunian's company, Skyfall 7 LLC dba Turf Paradise. Hartunian won a court injunction to access the Turf Paradise property after it was reported that his employees were locked out, but Turf Paradise and its OTBs were unable to accept simulcast wagers on that year's Breeders' Cup.

== Physical attributes ==
The track has a one-mile dirt course, with chutes for 6 1/2 furlong and 1 1/4 mile races (440 yards for Quarter Horses). The track previously ran races up to 3 furlongs on a straightaway. The turf course is 7/8 mile in circumference, with a diagonal chute for races up to 1 1/8 miles.

== Racing ==
Turf Paradise is home to the Turf Paradise Derby, a stakes race for three-year-old thoroughbreds typically run in February. Other notable stakes races include the Arizona Oaks for three-year-old fillies, the Phoenix Gold Cup for sprinters, and the Cotton Fitzsimmons Mile, a one-mile turf race named for the late head coach of the Phoenix Suns.

== In popular culture ==
Turf Paradise appears in a 1987 episode of the PBS children's television series Reading Rainbow, in which host LeVar Burton portrays a jockey.

Movies that were filmed at Turf Paradise include The Grifters (1990) and Jockey (2021).
