= Take Wing =

American-bred Thoroughbred racehorse

- Sire: Chicle
- Grandsire: Spearmint
- Dam: Eagle Flight
- Damsire: My Play
- Sex: Gelding
- Foaled: 1938
- Country: United States
- Colour: Bay
- Owner: 1) Howe Stable; 2) Joseph Poncurak; 3) W. B. Simpson; 4) Clyde Troutt
- Trainer: Clyde Troutt
- Record: 197: 38-28-22
- Earnings: US$167,820

Major wins
- Flossmoor Handicap (1942); Stars and Stripes Handicap (1942); Lincoln Handicap (1943, 1945); Meadowland Handicap (1944, 1945, 1947); Chuckatuck Purse (1946); La Salle Handicap (1947); Crescent City Handicap (1947); National Jockey Club Handicap (1947)

Take Wing (foaled 1938) was an American Thoroughbred gelding racehorse claimed for $3,000 and who would then earn more than $160,000 for new owner Clyde Troutt and set a new North American record for a mile and three-sixteenths on turf.

== Background ==
Take Wing was sired by Chicle who was the Leading sire in North America in 1929 and the Leading broodmare sire in North America in 1942. Take Wing's dam was a daughter of My Play, a multiple race winning full brother to Man o' War.

== Racing career ==
Trainer Clyde Troutt claimed Take Wing in early July 1942 and immediately won the Stars and Stripes Handicap at Arlington Park in a time that was just 1/5 of a second off the track record. For his win, the $3000 horse earned his new owner $8,600. Still racing at age nine, Take Wing set a new North American record of 1:55 1-5 for a mile and three-sixteenths on turf at Washington Park Racetrack in winning the Meadowland Handicap for the third time.

== Retirement ==
Following his retirement from racing, Take wing was used as a lead pony for owner-trainer Clyde Troutt.

== Pedigree ==
Pedigree of Take Wing, bay gelding, 1938
Sire Chicle	Spearmint	Carbine	Musket
Sire Chicle	Spearmint	Carbine	Mersey
Sire Chicle	Spearmint	Maid of the Mint	Minting
Sire Chicle	Spearmint	Maid of the Mint	Warble
Sire Chicle	Lady Hamburg	Hamburg	Hanover
Sire Chicle	Lady Hamburg	Hamburg	Lady Reel
Sire Chicle	Lady Hamburg	Lady Frivoles	St. Simon
Sire Chicle	Lady Hamburg	Lady Frivoles	Gay Duchess
Dam Eagle Flight	My Play	Fair Play	Hastings
Dam Eagle Flight	My Play	Fair Play	Fairy Gold
Dam Eagle Flight	My Play	Mahubah	Rock Sand
Dam Eagle Flight	My Play	Mahubah	Merry Token
Dam Eagle Flight	Way of an Eagle	White Eagle	Gallinule
Dam Eagle Flight	Way of an Eagle	White Eagle	Merry Gal
Dam Eagle Flight	Way of an Eagle	Gipsy Hill	Avington
Dam Eagle Flight	Way of an Eagle	Gipsy Hill	Swiftsure (family: 19-c)
