= Louie J. Roussel III =

American businessman and racehorse owner

Louis J. "Louie" Roussel III
Personal information
- Born: January 13, 1946 (age 80) New Orleans, Louisiana
- Occupation: Trainer

Horse racing career
- Sport: Horse racing
- Career wins: 1,000+ (ongoing)

Major racing wins
- Old Hickory Stakes (1973, 1993, 1996); Louisiana Handicap (1975, 1988, 2011); Whirlaway Handicap (1975 (2), 1994); Fair Grounds Oaks (1978); Bienville Stakes (1982, 1991); Woodchopper Stakes (1985); Tenacious Handicap (1987); Davona Dale Stakes (1988, 1998); F.W. Gaudin Memorial Handicap (1988); Lecomte Stakes (1988); Lexington Stakes (1988); Louisiana Derby (1988, 1994); Louisiana Derby Trial Stakes (1988); Silverbulletday Stakes (1988, 1995, 1998); Thanksgiving Handicap (1988); Colonel Power Stakes (1989, 1990,1991); Lafayette Stakes (1989); Dixie Poker Ace Stakes (1991); Letellier Memorial Stakes (1991, 1994, 1999); Pontalba Stakes (1996, 1997, 1998); Chou Croute Handicap (1996); Sugar Bowl Stakes (1996); Louisiana Champions Day Juvenile Stakes (1997); Black Gold Stakes (1998); Marie G. Krantz Memorial Handicap (1998); Pago Hop Stakes (1999); Sea o'Erin Stakes (2001); Illinois Derby (2008) American Classic Race wins: Preakness Stakes (1988); Belmont Stakes (1988)

Honours
- Fair Grounds Racing Hall of Fame

Significant horses
- Risen Star, Recapturetheglory

Louis J. Roussel III, known as Louie Roussel (born January 13, 1946, in New Orleans, Louisiana), is an American businessman and a Thoroughbred racehorse owner and trainer who owned Fair Grounds Race Course and who won the final two legs of the 1988 U.S. Triple Crown series with Risen Star, a colt later voted the Eclipse Award as the American Champion Three-Year-Old Male Horse.

Widely known as "Louie," he was the son of Louis J. Roussel Jr., and the former Lucy Cocchiarra. He graduated in 1967 from Louisiana State University in Baton Rouge and then in 1970 from the law school at Loyola University New Orleans. While still in college, he took out his Thoroughbred trainer's license. Except at the beginning, he has trained only his own horses or those he owns in a partnership.
