= Recapturetheglory =

American-bred Thoroughbred racehorse

- Sire: Cherokee Run
- Grandsire: Runaway Groom
- Dam: Cold Awakening
- Damsire: Dehere
- Sex: Colt
- Foaled: 2005
- Country: United States
- Colour: Bay
- Breeder: Charles Jacobi
- Owner: Louie Roussel III & Ronald Lamarque
- Trainer: Louie Roussel III
- Record: 24: 6-3-4
- Earnings: $545,656

Major wins
- Illinois Derby (2008); Louisiana Handicap (2011)

Recapturetheglory (foaled February 11, 2005) is an American Thoroughbred racehorse.

Recapturetheglory is a bay horse bred by Charles Jacobi. He was sired by the Breeders' Cup Sprint winner Cherokee Run is out of the mare Cold Awakening, by Dehere.

Recapturetheglory is owned by Louisianans Louie Roussel III and Ronald Lamarque, who also owned Risen Star, winner of the 1988 Preakness Stakes and Belmont Stakes. Conditioned for racing by Roussel, at age two the colt won for the first time in his third start in a September 29, 2007 maiden special weight race on at Hawthorne Race Course.

In his second start of 2008, Recapturetheglory was sent off as a 15-1 longshot in the 2008 Illinois Derby at Hawthorne Race Course. Under jockey E. T. Baird, the colt scored a convincing four-length victory and his winning purse means he qualified for the Kentucky Derby, the first leg of U.S. Triple Crown series. He finished 5th in the 2008 Kentucky Derby.

In 2011, at the age of 6, Recapturetheglory took the $100,000 Louisiana Handicap.
