= Bayuda (horse) =

British-bred Thoroughbred racehorse

- Sire: Bayardo
- Grandsire: Bay Ronald
- Dam: Jessica
- Damsire: Eager
- Sex: Mare
- Foaled: 1916
- Country: United Kingdom
- Colour: Bay
- Breeder: Lady James Douglas
- Owner: Lady James Douglas
- Trainer: Alec Taylor, Jr.
- Record: 7: 2-2-1

Major wins
- Cheveley Park Stakes (1918); Epsom Oaks (1919)

Bayuda (1916 – 1929) was a British Thoroughbred racehorse and broodmare. As a two-year-old in 1918 she won the Cheveley Park Stakes and was placed in several other races against male opposition. In the following year she was beaten in the 1000 Guineas before recording an upset victory in the Epsom Oaks. Her racing career was ended by injury later that year. As a broodmare she produced very few foals, but exerted an enduring influence on the breed as the female-line ancestor of Sharpen Up.

== Background ==
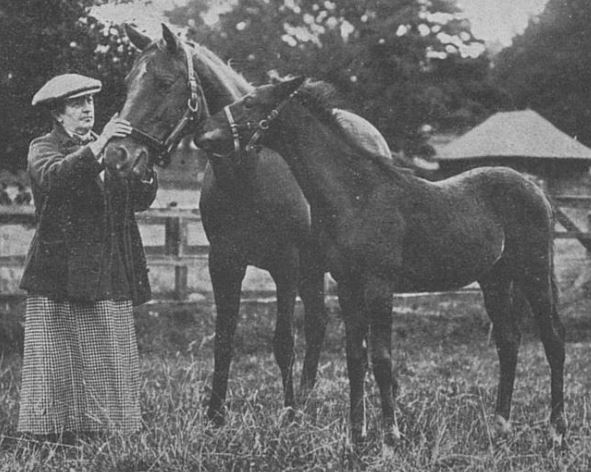
Lady James Douglas with Jessica in 1919.

Bayuda was a "small", but "handsome" bay mare bred in England by Lady James Douglas, who owned her during her racing career. Born Martha Lucy Hennessy, Lady James Douglas was the widow of Lord James Douglas, a younger son of the 8th Marquess of Queensberry. The filly was sent into training with by Alec Taylor, Jr. at Manton, Wiltshire.

She was sired by Bayardo, the best British racehorse of his era whose wins included the Eclipse Stakes, St. Leger Stakes Champion Stakes and Ascot Gold Cup. As a breeding stallion his other progeny included the Triple Crown winners Gay Crusader and Gainsborough. Bayuda's dam Jessica was a granddaughter of Bayolia, a half-sister to the Ascot Gold Cup winner Morion.

== Racing career ==
=== 1918: two-year-old season ===
Bayuda was one of the best British two-year-old fillies of her year. When matched against male opposition in the Autumn Stakes at Newmarket Racecourse in September, she finished three quarters of a length second to the season's best juvenile colt The Panther with Galloper Light (later to win the Grand Prix de Paris) in third. In October, ridden by Joe Childs, she started the 11/10 favourite for Cheveley Park Stakes over six furlongs at the same track and reportedly won "in a canter", from Beresina and Mapledurham. In her two other races that year she raced against colts, finishing fourth in the Soltikoff Stakes (to Grand Parade) and third in the Free Handicap.

=== 1919: three-year-old season ===
In May 1919, Bayuda ran in the 1000 Guineas over the Rowley Mile at Newmarket. Starting the 7/2 second choice in the betting she led till half way but then faded and finished fourth behind Roseway, Britannia and Glaciale. On 6 of June Bayuda contested the 141st running of the Oaks Stakes over one and a half miles at Epsom Racecourse. With Childs in the saddle she started at odds of 100/7 (just over 14/1) in a ten-runner field headed by Roseway, who went off at odds of 4/7. After racing towards the rear of the field in the early stages as Britannia set the pace from Lady Pergrine, Beresina and Roseway, but began to make rapid progress approaching the final turn. Bayuda took the lead a furlong out and won the race by one and a half lengths from Roseway with Mapledurham the same distance away in third. Her winning timeof 2:37.2 was a new record for the race.

On her next appearance Bayuda ran in the St George Stakes over eleven furlongs at Liverpool Racecourse in July. She was beaten a head by Lord Derby's colt Rothesay Bay, to whom she was conceding 21 pounds in weight. Bayuda was being prepared for a run in the St Leger when she broke down in training and was retired from racing.

== Assessment and honours ==
In their book, A Century of Champions, based on the Timeform rating system, John Randall and Tony Morris rated Bayuda an "inferior" winner of the Oaks.

== Breeding record ==
After her retirement from racing Bayuda became a broodmare. She proved to be very difficult to get in foal and produced very few foals before her death in 1929. Her issue included:

- Hajibibi, a bay filly, foaled in 1921, sired by Hurry On. Female-line ancestor of Sharpen Up.
- Bayonet, by Verdun. Winner.

== Pedigree ==
Pedigree of Bayuda (GB), bay mare, 1916
Sire Bayardo (GB) 1906	Bay Ronald; 1893	Hampton	Lord Clifden
Sire Bayardo (GB) 1906	Bay Ronald; 1893	Hampton	Lady Langden
Sire Bayardo (GB) 1906	Bay Ronald; 1893	Black Duchess	Galliard
Sire Bayardo (GB) 1906	Bay Ronald; 1893	Black Duchess	Black Corrie
Sire Bayardo (GB) 1906	Galicia; 1898	Galopin	Vedette
Sire Bayardo (GB) 1906	Galicia; 1898	Galopin	Flying Duchess
Sire Bayardo (GB) 1906	Galicia; 1898	Isoletta	Isonomy
Sire Bayardo (GB) 1906	Galicia; 1898	Isoletta	Lady Muncastet
Dam Jessica (GB) 1909	Eager; 1894	Enthusiast	Sterling
Dam Jessica (GB) 1909	Eager; 1894	Enthusiast	Cherry Duchess
Dam Jessica (GB) 1909	Eager; 1894	Greeba	Melton
Dam Jessica (GB) 1909	Eager; 1894	Greeba	Sunrise
Dam Jessica (GB) 1909	Barcarole (GER); 1900	Saraband (GB)	Muncaster
Dam Jessica (GB) 1909	Barcarole (GER); 1900	Saraband (GB)	Highland Fling
Dam Jessica (GB) 1909	Barcarole (GER); 1900	Bayolia (GB)	Friar's Balsam
Dam Jessica (GB) 1909	Barcarole (GER); 1900	Bayolia (GB)	Chaplet (Family: 5-i)
