= Peaks and Valleys =

American-bred Thoroughbred racehorse

- Sire: Mt. Livermore
- Grandsire: Blushing Groom
- Dam: Strike a Balance
- Damsire: Green Dancer
- Sex: Stallion
- Foaled: 1992
- Country: United States
- Colour: Dark Bay
- Breeder: Pin Oak Stud
- Owner: Pin Oak Stable
- Trainer: James E. Day
- Record: 16: 9-3-2
- Earnings: $1,589,270

Major wins
- Illinois Derby (1995); Derby Trial Stakes (1995); Meadowlands Cup (1995); Molson Export Million (1995)

Awards
- Canadian Champion 3-Yr-Old-Colt (1995); Canadian Horse of the Year (1995)
- Last updated on July 10, 2008

Peaks and Valleys (1992–2012) was a Canadian Thoroughbred racehorse.

== Background ==
Bred by Josephine Abercrombie's Pin Oak Stud in Versailles, Kentucky, he was the son of Carter Handicap winner Mt. Livermore, a son of the very important Champion sire, Blushing Groom. Peaks and Valleys' dam was Strike a Balance, a daughter of the French Champion sire, Green Dancer.

Peaks and Valleys was trained by Olympic Equestrian Gold medalist and Canadian Horse Racing Hall of Fame trainer, Jim Day.

== Racing career ==
Peaks and Valleys began racing at age two with a win at River Downs in Cincinnati, Ohio followed by two more victories at Woodbine Racetrack in Toronto, Canada.

At age three in 1995, Peaks and Valleys won the Derby Trial but skipped the American Triple Crown races. Under future U.S. Racing Hall of Fame jockey Julie Krone, he also won the Grade I Molson Export Million Stakes at Woodbine Racetrack and the Grade I Meadowlands Cup at the Meadowlands Racetrack in East Rutherford, New Jersey. He also beat Da Hoss by two lengths to win the Illinois Derby in Chicago. After his win in the last of these races, Krone described him as "a magnificent horse with a long, smooth stride." Although he finished sixth in the Breeders' Cup Classic, his 1995 performances earned Peaks and Valleys the Sovereign Award for Champion 3-Year-Old Male Horse and Canadian Horse of the Year titles.

In 1996, four-year-old Peaks and Valleys made four starts. He won an allowance race at Belmont Park and finished second in both the Saratoga Breeders' Cup Handicap and Whitney Handicap at the Saratoga Race Course.

== Stud record ==
At the end of the year, Peaks and Valleys was retired and entered stud for the 1997 season. He first stood at Pin Oak's stud farm in Kentucky before being sent to Gardiner Farms in Caledon, Ontario. Among his offspring are multiple U.S. stakes winner Dollar Bill (b. 1998), Zurbaran (b. 1999) who earned Horse of the Year honors in India, and Pinpoint (b. 2002), winner of the Sir Barton Stakes.
