= Chris Haney (Trivial Pursuit) =

Canadian game designer

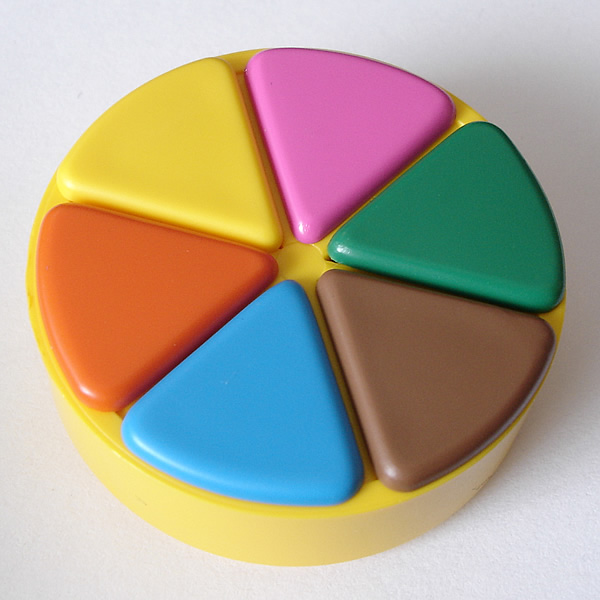
A Trivial Pursuit playing piece, with all six wedges filled in.

Chris Haney (August 9, 1950 – May 31, 2010) was a Canadian journalist and co-creator of the Trivial Pursuit board game with Scott Abbott.

== Early life ==
Haney was born on August 9, 1950 in Welland, Ontario. He attended a high school in Hamilton, Ontario but dropped out at age 17, a decision he later regretted, saying he should have dropped out earlier. His father worked for The Canadian Press news agency and helped him get a job as a copy boy with the company. He was hired by The Montreal Gazette after working at photo desks in Montreal and Ottawa.

== Career ==
Haney was working at the Montreal Gazette as a photo editor and met Abbott in December 1975 after being assigned to support coverage of the 1976 Summer Olympics held in Montreal. The two developed the game on December 15, 1979, after a game of Scrabble got them thinking of ideas for a new alternative, with Haney coming up with the idea for a trivia game over a round of beers. Within an hour, Haney and Scott had mapped out the game with its six-spoked circular board and multiple categories on a few sheets of paper. Posing as reporters, they attended a toy fair in Montreal and came back with invaluable information they had obtained from game experts attending the show. Haney hoped the game would allow him to earn enough extra money to be able to travel to Spain and throughout Europe. After adding Haney's brother and a friend to their development team, The group needed investors and they raised $40,000 from 32 people. Haney talked his mother out of investing in the game for fear that he would cause her to lose her investment. Haney traveled to Spain, where he spent long days developing the trivia to be included in the game.

The Trivial Pursuit game that they developed was trademarked on November 10, 1981, and 1,100 copies of the game were released later that month for sale by retailers for $15. The company they formed to market the game, Horn Abbot, lost money on each of these initial sets, which cost $75 each to manufacture. The game's sales started slowly and Abbott and Haney didn't receive any interest from buyers at trade shows in Canada and the U.S. The game started developing sales by word of mouth and exploded by 1984, reaching sales of $800 million.

In 1986, Horn Abbot released a followup to Trivial Pursuit, called The World According to Ubi. It was unsuccessful due to the complicated gameplay and perceived lack of excitement that fans of Trivial Pursuit had expected.

Selchow and Righter licensed the rights to the game in 1988. The rights to the game were purchased by Hasbro in 2008 for US$80 million. Haney would eventually have enough money to travel, taking cruise ships across the Atlantic to Europe because he was afraid of flying.

In 1984 alone, 20 million copies of the game were sold, and by the time of his death, global sales of the game had reached 100 million copies in 26 countries and 17 languages, with cumulative sales estimated to be well in excess of $1 billion since its creation.

Haney died in Toronto at age 59 on May 31, 2010, due to complications of kidney disease and circulatory problems. Haney was survived by his second wife, Hiam, his first wife, Sarah, and their three children.
