= Ten Most Wanted (horse) =

American-bred Thoroughbred racehorse

- Sire: Deputy Commander
- Dam: Wanted Again
- Damsire: Criminal Type
- Foaled: February 24, 2000
- Country: United States
- Colour: Dark Bay
- Breeder: Jim H. Plemmons
- Owner: J. Paul Reddam, James Chisholm, Michael Jarvis
- Trainer: Wally Dollase
- Record: 13:5-3-1
- Earnings: US$1,718,460

Major wins
- Travers Stakes (2003), Illinois Derby (2003), Super Derby (2003), Bill Hartack Memorial Handicap (2004)

Ten Most Wanted (February 24, 2000 – January 8, 2013) was an American-bred Thoroughbred race horse and sire. Bred in Kentucky, he was owned by James Chisholm, Michael Jarvis and J. Paul Reddam. At the end of 2004, his fourth year, he had a record of 5–3–1 out of thirteen starts. In total, he won five of his 13 career starts. He retired from racing in 2004 and began his stud career at Magali Farms stud farm in Santa Ynez, California, where he sired 71 stakes winners including Lady On the Run and Tenth Power. He died on January 8, 2013, at the age of 12 in Panama at the British Mist Breeding Station. He had been moved there in late November 2012 after being sold for more stud duty.

== Racing career ==
Ten Most Wanted had his first start at Hollywood Park in November 2002 where he finished in second place.

He broke his maiden at Santa Anita on January 5, 2003. On April 5, 2003, he won the Illinois Derby and was prepped for the Kentucky Derby. However, he stumbled during the race and finished in ninth place at Churchill Downs (2003 race results). His owners decided to race him in the Belmont Stakes and he finished 2nd to Empire Maker. He then ran the Travers Stakes at Saratoga on August 23, 2003, and the Louisiana Downs Super Derby on September 20, 2003, both of which he won. His last race was at Hawthorne in what was the National Jockey Club Handicap (which has since been renamed Bill Hartack Memorial Handicap) on April 17, 2004, and he finished in first place.

== Stud career ==
Ten Most Wanted began his stud career at Gainesway Farm in Lexington, Kentucky. He later stood at Sequel Stallions New York, and recently was taken to Magali Farm in Santa Ynez, California. The horse's stud fee in 2012 was USD$1,250. Within nine years, he had sired 71 stakes winners who had earned $3,237,266. His most successful offspring include the New York Stallion Series winner Lady on the Run and Tenth Power.

== Pedigree ==
Pedigree of Ten Most Wanted, dark bay stallion, 2000
| Sire Deputy Commander (USA) 1994 | Deputy Minister (CAN); 1979 | Vice Regent | Northern Dancer |
| Sire Deputy Commander (USA) 1994 | Deputy Minister (CAN); 1979 | Vice Regent | Victoria Regina |
| Sire Deputy Commander (USA) 1994 | Deputy Minister (CAN); 1979 | Mint Copy | Bunty's Flight |
| Sire Deputy Commander (USA) 1994 | Deputy Minister (CAN); 1979 | Mint Copy | Shakney |
| Sire Deputy Commander (USA) 1994 | Anka Germania (IRE); 1982 | Malinowski | Sir Ivor |
| Sire Deputy Commander (USA) 1994 | Anka Germania (IRE); 1982 | Malinowski | Best in Show |
| Sire Deputy Commander (USA) 1994 | Anka Germania (IRE); 1982 | Affaire d'Amour | Tudor Music |
| Sire Deputy Commander (USA) 1994 | Anka Germania (IRE); 1982 | Affaire d'Amour | Fair Darling |
| Dam Wanted Again (USA) 1992 | Criminal Type (USA); 1985 | Alydar | Raise a Native |
| Dam Wanted Again (USA) 1992 | Criminal Type (USA); 1985 | Alydar | Sweet Tooth |
| Dam Wanted Again (USA) 1992 | Criminal Type (USA); 1985 | Klepto | No Robbery |
| Dam Wanted Again (USA) 1992 | Criminal Type (USA); 1985 | Klepto | Blue Blur |
| Dam Wanted Again (USA) 1992 | Landera (USA); 1971 | In Reality | Intentionally |
| Dam Wanted Again (USA) 1992 | Landera (USA); 1971 | In Reality | My Dear Girl |
| Dam Wanted Again (USA) 1992 | Landera (USA); 1971 | Good Landing | First Landing |
| Dam Wanted Again (USA) 1992 | Landera (USA); 1971 | Good Landing | Best Side |
