= Percy Hope =

American-bred Thoroughbred racehorse

- Sire: Ide
- Dam: Ridinghood
- Sex: Colt
- Foaled: 1998
- Country: United States
- Colour: Bay
- Breeder: Willmott Stables & Thomas Willmott
- Owner: Waterfalls Stable
- Trainer: Anthony Reinstedler
- Record: 14-4-4-2
- Earnings: $428,397

Major wins
- Rushaway Stakes (2001); Lone Star Derby (2001)
- Last updated on March 12, 2010

Percy Hope (foaled on April 28, 1998, in Kentucky) was an American thoroughbred racehorse who won the Rushaway Stakes and the Lone Star Derby in 2001. He started in the 2001 Preakness Stakes, finishing 9th.

He became the second horse since Anet in 1997 to win both the Rushaway and the Lone Star Derby.
