= Illinois Derby =

Illinois Derby discontinued
- Class: Grade III (1973–1988; 2010–2017); Grade II (1997–2009)
- Location: Hawthorne Race Course; Stickney, Illinois, U.S.
- Inaugurated: 1923
- Final run: 2024
- Race type: Thoroughbred - Flat racing
- Sponsor: TVG (2011 only)
- Website: www.hawthorneracecourse.com

Race information
- Distance: 1 1/8 miles (9 furlongs)
- Surface: Dirt
- Track: Left-handed
- Qualification: Three-year-olds
- Weight: 122 lbs (55.3 kg)
- Purse: $200,000 (2024)

The Illinois Derby was an American Grade III Thoroughbred horse race for three-year-olds, held over a distance of 1 1/8 miles (9 furlongs) at Hawthorne Race Course in Stickney, Illinois, just west of Chicago in early April.

The race had been a Grade II race with an offering of a purse of $500,000, however, it was reduced to a Grade III race for 2010 by the American Graded Stakes Committee.

During its lifespan, the race took multiple long hiatuses. The race was not run from 1939–1962, 1970–1971, 2016, and 2018–2023.

Notable winners of the race included: War Emblem, Ten Most Wanted,Sweetnorthernsaint and Musket Man.

== History ==
The race was named in honor of the home state in which it was run, the state of Illinois.

The inaugural running of the race took place at Hawthorne in 1923 over 1 1/4 miles and was won by In Memoriam, the 3-year-old champion with Zev that year.

The race was then run at Sportsman's Park from 1924–1932, however no results of these races survive.

From 1933–1938, the race was run at Aurora Downs racetrack.

In 1934, the race was won by Mata Hari, the only filly to win the race.

In 1939, the race went on hiatus until through 1962. Then the race was revived at Sportsman's Park Racetrack again in 1963 where it remained through its 2002 running.

The race was first graded in 1973 when the grading system started as a grade three stakes race and in 1997 was elevated to a grade two stakes race.

In 1997, at Sportsman's Park, Wild Rush set the record for the fastest time in the Illinois Derby at 1:47.51.

Before 2000, the race was run between the Kentucky Derby and the Preakness Stakes thus competing with the second leg of the Triple Crown for good runners. Beginning in 2001, the Illinois Derby was moved to four weeks before the Kentucky Derby and became a major Triple Crown prep race.

The 2002 Illinois Derby won by War Emblem was the last Derby run at Sportsman's Park Racetrack before its closure the next month. War Emblem went on to become a "Dual Classic Winner" by winning the Kentucky Derby and the Preakness Stakes. War Emblem helped elevate the prestige of the Illinois Derby by displaying that a race winner could go on to even bigger glory. War Emblem would be the only Illinois Derby winner to also win the Kentucky Derby.

In 2004, Pollard's Vision also helped increase the stature of the race when he won it. Pollard's Vision was a colt who was blind in his right eye, he was named in honor of Seabiscuit's jockey Red Pollard, who also lost sight in his right eye.

In 2006, Sweetnorthernsaint, the Illinois Derby winner that year, helped the stature of the race after recording the highest beyer speed figure of the year in the race and was installed as the morning line favorite in the Kentucky Derby. Sweetnorthernsait went on to become the Preakness Stakes runner-up to Bernardini in the race where Barbaro was fatally injured.

In 2012, the purse was reinstated to $500,000, but reduced to $400,000 in 2015.

In 2016, the race was cancelled due to a reduction in stakes races. The race returned the following year, however would not be run for the next 6 years.

In 2024, the race made a one-off return, which was won by Patriot Spirit. After the closure of Hawthorne in 2026, the race's future is uncertain.

== Winners ==
Year	Winner	Jockey	Trainer	Owner	Time	Purse$	Track	Gr.
2024	Patriot Spirit	Julio E. Felix	Michael B. Campbell	Mellon Patch, Inc.	1:50.43	$200,000	Hawthorne	
2017	Multiplier	James Graham	Brendan P. Walsh	American Equistock	1:47.98	$250,000	Hawthorne	III
2015	Whiskey Ticket	Martin A. Pedroza	Bob Baffert	Karl Watson, Michael E. Pegram, Paul Weitman	1:50.82	$400,000	Hawthorne	III
2014	Dynamic Impact	Miguel Mena	Mark E. Casse	John C. Oxley	1:49.07	$750,000	Hawthorne	III
2013	Departing	Brian Hernandez Jr.	Albert Stall Jr.	Claiborne Farm	1:50.78	$750,000	Hawthorne	III
2012	Done Talking	Sheldon Russell	Hamilton Smith	Skeedattle Stable	1:53.88	$500,000	Hawthorne	III
2011	Joe Vann	Florent Geroux	Todd Pletcher	Zayat Stable	1:51.91	$300,000	Hawthorne	III
2010	American Lion	David Flores	Eoin G. Harty	WinStar Farm	1:51.31	$500,000	Hawthorne	III
2009	Musket Man	Eibar Coa	Derek S. Ryan	Eric Fein & Vic Carlson	1:49.91	$500,000	Hawthorne	II
2008	Recapturetheglory	E. T. Baird	Louie J. Roussel III	Louis J. Roussel III & Ronald Lamarque	1:49.01	$500,000	Hawthorne	II
2007	Cowtown Cat	Fernando Jara	Todd A. Pletcher	WinStar Farm	1:51.21	$500,000	Hawthorne	II
2006	Sweetnorthernsaint	Kent Desormeaux	Michael Trombetta	Joseph J. Balsamo & Ted Theos	1:49.82	$500,000	Hawthorne	II
2005	Greeley's Galaxy	Kent Desormeaux	Glen Stute	B. Wayne Hughes	1:49.62	$500,000	Hawthorne	II
2004	Pollard's Vision	Eibar Coa	Todd A. Pletcher	Edgewood Farm	1:50.80	$500,000	Hawthorne	II
2003	Ten Most Wanted	Pat Day	Wallace Dollase	James Chisholm, J. Paul Reddam, Michael Jarvis	1:51.47	$500,000	Hawthorne	II
2002	War Emblem	Larry Sterling Jr.	Frank R. Springer	Russell Reineman Stable	1:49.42	$500,000	Sportsman's Park	II
2001	Distilled	Mike E. Smith	Todd A. Pletcher	Dogwood Stable	1:51.37	$500,000	Sportsman's Park	II
2000	Performing Magic	Shane Sellers	Alex L. Hassinger Jr.	The Thoroughbred Corp.	1:50.86	$500,000	Sportsman's Park	II
1999	Vision and Verse	Herbert Castillo	William I. Mott	W. Bruce Lunsford	1:48.47	$500,000	Sportsman's Park	II
1998	Yarrow Brae	Willie Martinez	D. Wayne Lukas	Michael Tabor & Susan Magnier	1:51.21	$500,000	Sportsman's Park	II
1997	Wild Rush	Kent Desormeaux	Richard Mandella	Frank Stronach	1:47.51	$500,000	Sportsman's Park	II
1996	Natural Selection	Randy Romero	Mohamed Moubarak	Buckram Oak Farm (Mahmoud Fustuq)	1:48.60	$500,000	Sportsman's Park	III
1995	Peaks and Valleys	Julie Krone	James E. Day	Pin Oak Stable	1:48.99	$500,000	Sportsman's Park	III
1994	Rustic Light	Earlie Fires	Robert Hale	Phillip Brooks & Robert Hale	1:51.89	$500,000	Sportsman's Park	III
1993	Antrim Rd.	Aaron Gryder	Glenn Wismer	Alyce & Joseph Novogratz	1:48.68	$500,000	Sportsman's Park	III
1992	Dignitas	Jerry D. Bailey	George R. Arnold II	John Peace	1:49.09	$533,500	Sportsman's Park	III
1991	Richman	Jerry D. Bailey	William I. Mott	William F. Lucas	1:49.36	$530,000	Sportsman's Park	III
1990	Dotsero	Aaron Gryder	Tim Muckler	J. Malkin, B. Glazov, et al.	1:50.60	$315,000	Sportsman's Park	III
1989	Music Merci	Gary Stevens	Craig C. Lewis	Harvey & Thea Cohen	1:50.20	$515,000	Sportsman's Park	III
1988	Proper Reality	Jerry D. Bailey	Robert E. Holthus	Mrs. James A. Winn	1:50.20	$535,000	Sportsman's Park	III
1987	Lost Code	Gene St. Leon	L. William Donovan	Wendover Stable	1:49.60	$313,550	Sportsman's Park	III
1986	Bolshoi Boy	Richard Migliore	Howard M. Tesher	Art Belford & John Greathouse	1:52.20	$315,000	Sportsman's Park	III
1985	Important Business	Juvenal L. Diaz	LeRoy Jolley	Ilene & Skip Taylor	1:51.60	$320,000	Sportsman's Park	III
1984	Delta Trace	Keith K. Allen	Robert J. Frankel	Ann & Jerry Moss	1:51.80	$210,000	Sportsman's Park	III
1983	Gen'l Practitioner	Jose A. Santiago	Leo Sierra	William Blair	1:50.40	$210,000	Hawthorne	III
1982	Star Gallant	Ray Sibille	Lenny Imperio	Mahmoud Fustuq	1:52.60	$210,000	Sportsman's Park	III
1981	Paristo	David Ashcroft	George R. Handy	Robert & Ruth Feinberg	1:49.60	$155,000	Sportsman's Park	III
1980	Ray's Word	Richard DePass	Smiley Adams	Not found	1:52.00	$155,000	Sportsman's Park	III
1979	Smarten	Sam Maple	Woody Stephens	Ryehill Farm (Jim & Eleanor Ryan)	1:49.40	$150,000	Sportsman's Park	III
1978	Batonnier	Ronald Hirdes Jr.	Harry Trotsek	Edward Seltzer	1:51.60	$105,000	Sportsman's Park	III
1977	Flag Officer	Leslie Ahrens	George J. Getz	Chuck Schmidt & Philip Teinowitz	1:52.20	$105,000	Sportsman's Park	III
1976	Life's Hope	Sandy Hawley	Laz Barrera	Harbor View Farm	1:51.40	$125,000	Sportsman's Park	III
1975	Colonel Power	Phil Rubbicco	John O. Meaux	Harvey Peltier Sr.	1:50.20	$105,000	Sportsman's Park	III
1974	Sharp Gary	Gerland Gallitano	Joseph DiAngelo	Edward R. Scharps	1:50.00	$105,000	Sportsman's Park	III
1973	Big Whippendeal	Larry Adams	John Fulton	Kinship Stables	1:50.20	$75,000	Sportsman's Park	III
1972	Fame And Power	Tony Rini	John O. Meaux	Harvey Peltier Sr.	1:50.00	$70,000	Sportsman's Park	
1969	King of the Castle	Braulio Baeza	Edward A. Neloy	Ogden Phipps	1:51.40	$80,000	Sportsman's Park	
1968	Bold Favorite	Robert Nono	Del W. Carroll	Michael G. Phipps	1:50.20	$75,000	Sportsman's Park	
1967	Royal Malabar	N/A	N/A	N/A	1:51.20	N/A	Sportsman's Park	
1966	Michigan Avenue	N/A	N/A	N/A	1:51.40	N/A	Sportsman's Park	
1965	Terra Hi (Div. I)	N/A	Robert E. Holthus	N/A	1:51.60	N/A	Sportsman's Park	
1965	Turn to Reason (Div. II)	N/A	John W. Jacobs	N/A	1:52.20	N/A	Sportsman's Park	
1964	Nushka	N/A	Joseph H. Pierce, Jr.	N/A	1:53.60	N/A	Hawthorne	
1963	Lemon Twist	N/A	Peter C. Keiser	N/A	1:52.60	N/A	Sportsman's Park	
1938	Gov. Chandler	N/A	N/A	N/A	1:58.00	N/A	Hawthorne	
1937	Case Ace	N/A	Robert V. McGarvey	N/A	1:51.80	N/A	Aurora Downs	
1936	Rushaway	N/A	Alfred G. Tarn	N/A	1:50.80	N/A	Aurora Downs	
1935	Sun Portland	N/A	J. Thomas Taylor	N/A	1:50.00	N/A	Hawthorne	
1934	Mata Hari	N/A	Clyde Van Dusen	N/A	1:49.80	N/A	Aurora Downs	
1933	Sweeprush	N/A	N/A	N/A	2:08.00	N/A	Aurora Downs	
1923	In Memoriam	N/A	Robert J. Gilmore	N/A	2:04.20	N/A	Hawthorne	

== See also ==
- Illinois Derby top three finishers and starters
