= Aurora Downs =

Horse racing facility in Aurora, Illinois

Coordinates: 41°47′53.9″N 88°20′03.9″W

Aurora Downs was a horse racing facility in Aurora, Illinois, that hosted thoroughbred racing and harness racing events as early as 1891.

== History ==
The Downs was originally a half-mile track named Aurora Driving Park, located north of Illinois Avenue and west of Lake Street in Aurora. The Park hosted many area events in addition to racing, including circuses, fairs, and the first powered airplane flight in Illinois on July 4, 1910, with an exhibition of the Wright brothers airplane.

In 1922, a new one-mile track was built on the site of the newly constructed Exposition Park in North Aurora and renamed Aurora Downs. The famous Illinois Derby ran there from 1932 through 1938 before suspending the race for 23 years. A local newspaper reported more than 30,000 racing fans crowded the track in the height of the 1937 season. The Downs also hosted auto racing events in addition to horse racing.

The Downs closed during World War II, then added a half-mile oval when it reopened again in 1946. The track closed 1952, and harness racing was shifted to neighboring Maywood Park. In 1955, there were two fires at Aurora Downs in eight days. The track reopened in 1958 after a major renovation, but over time, attendance at the track declined and the track closed and reopened several more times until 1976. At that time, a new owner reopened the facility as Fox Fields with Sunday-only racing, but the track closed permanently in 1981.

== Location ==
According to maps from the United States Geological Survey, The Aurora Downs and Exposition Park that was founded on February 17, 1922, and boasted the largest swimming pool measuring 320 feet by 160 feet; a race track with grand stand and a golf course. were located just north of the original Aurora Airport, which was south of Airport Road. The Park was built on the north side of Airport Road. The Chicago, Burlington, and Quincy Railroad ran a branch line up to Batavia, Illinois. This line ran past Expositon Park and appeared to have sidings, presumably for freight service. According to Current Day Maps and Sattalite Imgery, the area that was once Exposition Park and The Aurora Downs is now grounds for Valley Green Golf Course and an Industrial Park built on Airport Road.
