= Trivial Pursuit =

Board game

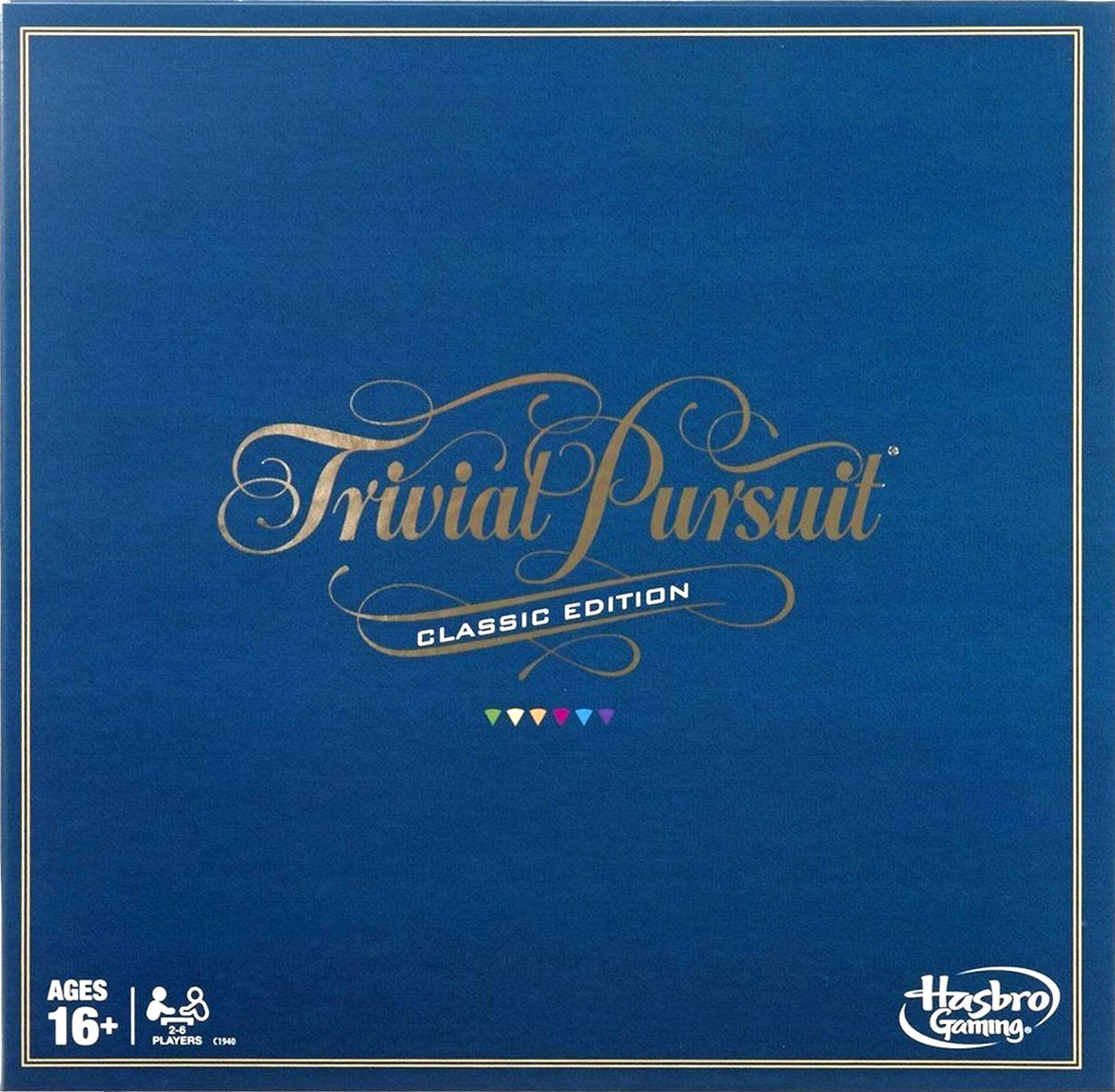
- Cover for the Classic Edition
- Designers: Chris Haney; Scott Abbott
- Publishers: Selchow and Righter; Parker Brothers; Hasbro
- Publication: 1981; 45 years ago
- Years active: 1981–present
- Genres: Board game
- Languages: English
- Players: 2–6 (teams allowed)
- Setup time: 5 minutes
- Playing time: 45–90 minutes
- Chance: Medium (dice, order of question cards)
- Skills: General knowledge, knowledge of popular culture

Trivial Pursuit is a Canadian board game in which winning is determined by a player's ability to answer trivia and popular culture questions. Players move their pieces around a board, the squares they land on determining the subject of a question they are asked from a card (from six categories including "history" and "science and nature"). Each correct answer allows the player's turn to continue; a correct answer on one of the six "category headquarters" spaces earns a plastic wedge which is slotted into the answerer's playing piece. The object of the game is to collect all six wedges from each "category headquarters" space, and then return to the center "hub" space to answer a question in a category selected by the other players.

Since the game's first release in 1981, numerous themed editions have been released. Some question sets have been designed for younger players, and others for a specific time period or as promotional tie-ins (such as Star Wars, Saturday Night Live, and The Lord of the Rings movies).

== History ==
The game was created on December 15, 1979, in Montreal, Quebec, by Canadians Chris Haney, a photo editor for Montreal's The Gazette, and Scott Abbott, a sports editor for The Canadian Press. Various versions of the events leading up to the creation of Trivial Pursuit exist, most involving the board game Scrabble. The game was designed within 45 minutes on the back of a cigarette carton. The questions were researched over 1980, and the test marketing was done in 1981. With the help of John Haney and Ed Werner, they completed development of the game, which was released in 1981 in Canada. During the development of the game, some of the early work and question writing was completed by Chris and John Haney in Weymouth Library, Dorset where they were staying with family.

By 1982, the game had sold 100,000 copies in Canada. Sales began in the U.S in 1983. Between 1983 and 1988, it sold 30 million copies of the original version; retail sales were at 750,000,000$.

The rights to the game were initially licensed to Selchow and Righter in 1982, then to Parker Brothers (later part of Hasbro) in 1988, after initially being turned down by the Virgin Group; in 2008, Hasbro bought the full rights, for US$80 million.

By 1986, the board game had sold 20 million units, grossing $600 million in sales. As of 2014, more than 100 million games had been sold in 26 countries and 17 languages. Northern Plastics of Elroy, Wisconsin produced 30,000,000 games between 1983 and 1985. In December 1993, Trivial Pursuit was named to the "Games Hall of Fame" by Games magazine. An online version of Trivial Pursuit was launched in September 2003.

In 2025, Trivial Pursuit was inducted into the National Toy Hall of Fame at The Strong National Museum of Play.

== Gameplay ==
The object of the game is to move around the board by correctly answering trivia questions. Questions are split into six categories, with each one having its own color to readily identify itself; in the classic version of Trivial Pursuit, the Geography category is blue, Entertainment is pink, History is yellow, Art & Literature is originally brown, later purple, Science & Nature is green, and Sports & Leisure is orange. The game includes a board, playing pieces, question cards, a box, small plastic wedges to fit into the playing pieces, and a die.

Playing pieces used in Trivial Pursuit are round and divided into six sections like wedges of pie. A small plastic wedge, sometimes called a cheese (like a wedge of cheese), can be placed into each of these sections to mark each player's progress.

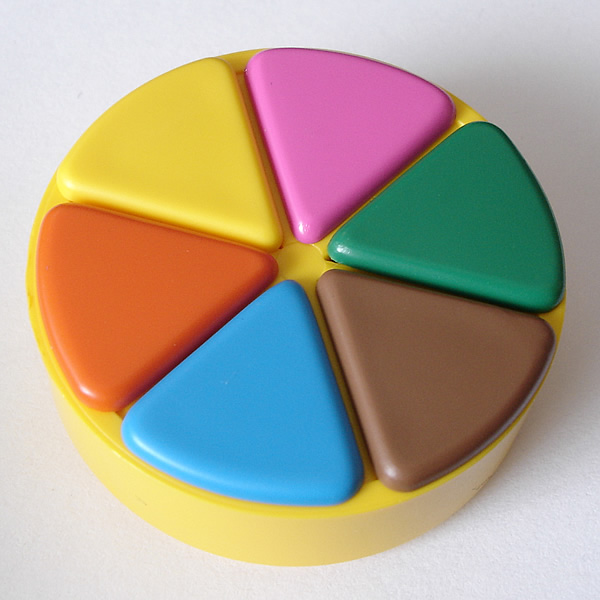
A Trivial Pursuit playing piece, with all six wedges filled

During the game, players move their playing pieces around a board which is shaped like a wheel with six spokes, rolling a single die to determine how far to move. The board is divided into spaces of different colors, and the center space is a hexagonal "hub." At the end of each spoke is a "category headquarters" space. After landing on a space, the player is asked a question in the category corresponding to its color. A correct answer allows the player to roll the die again and continue their turn, while a miss passes control to the next player in sequence. Questions must be answered without any outside assistance. Landing on a category headquarters space and answering correctly awards a wedge in that color, if the player does not yet have one; wedges are fitted into the playing pieces as they are earned. The player may move in any available direction and change directions at any category headquarters space or the hub, but may not backtrack.

"Roll Again" spaces allow the player an extra die roll without having to answer a question, while landing on the hub allows a player to answer a question in the category of their choice as long as they do not yet have all six wedges. Any number of playing pieces may occupy a given space at the same time. A variant rule ends a player's turn on collecting a wedge, preventing a single knowledgeable player from running the board.

After collecting all six wedges and filling their playing piece, the player must land on the hub by exact count and correctly answer a question in a category chosen by the opponents in order to win the game. If the player misses the question, they must leave the hub on their next turn and return to it for another chance to win.

== Editions ==
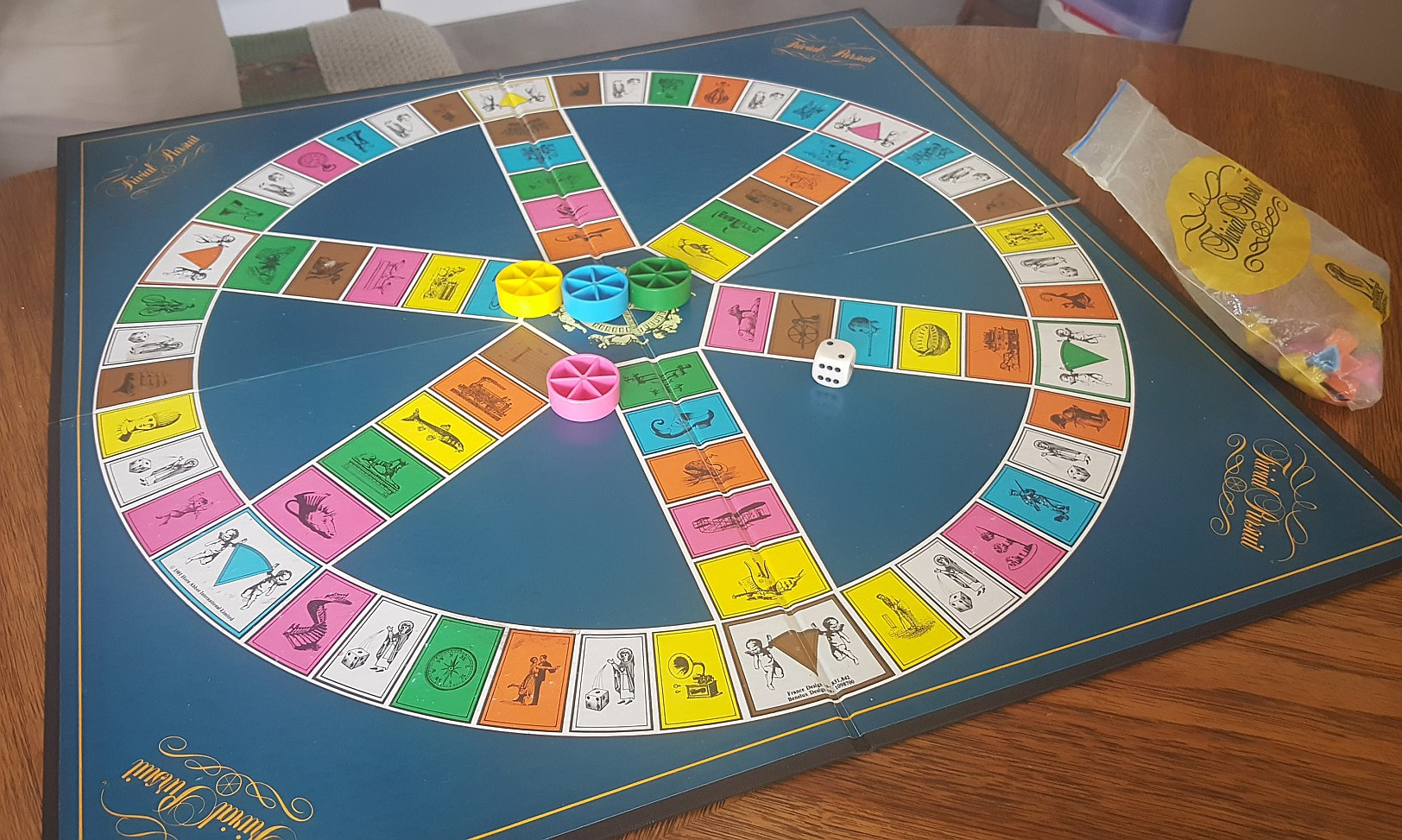
Board and pieces of Trivial Pursuit

Over the years, numerous editions of Trivial Pursuit have been produced, usually specializing in various fields. The original version is known as the Genus edition (or Genus I). Several different general knowledge editions (such as Genus II) have followed. Other editions include Junior Edition (1985), All-Star Sports, Baby Boomers, 1980s, All About the 80s, 1990s, Harry Potter, and others. In total, over 100 different editions in different languages have been printed.

In the United Kingdom, Trivial Pursuit players complained that the 2006 version of the game was dumbed down in comparison to previous editions, with easier questions and more focus on celebrities and show business.

== Reception ==
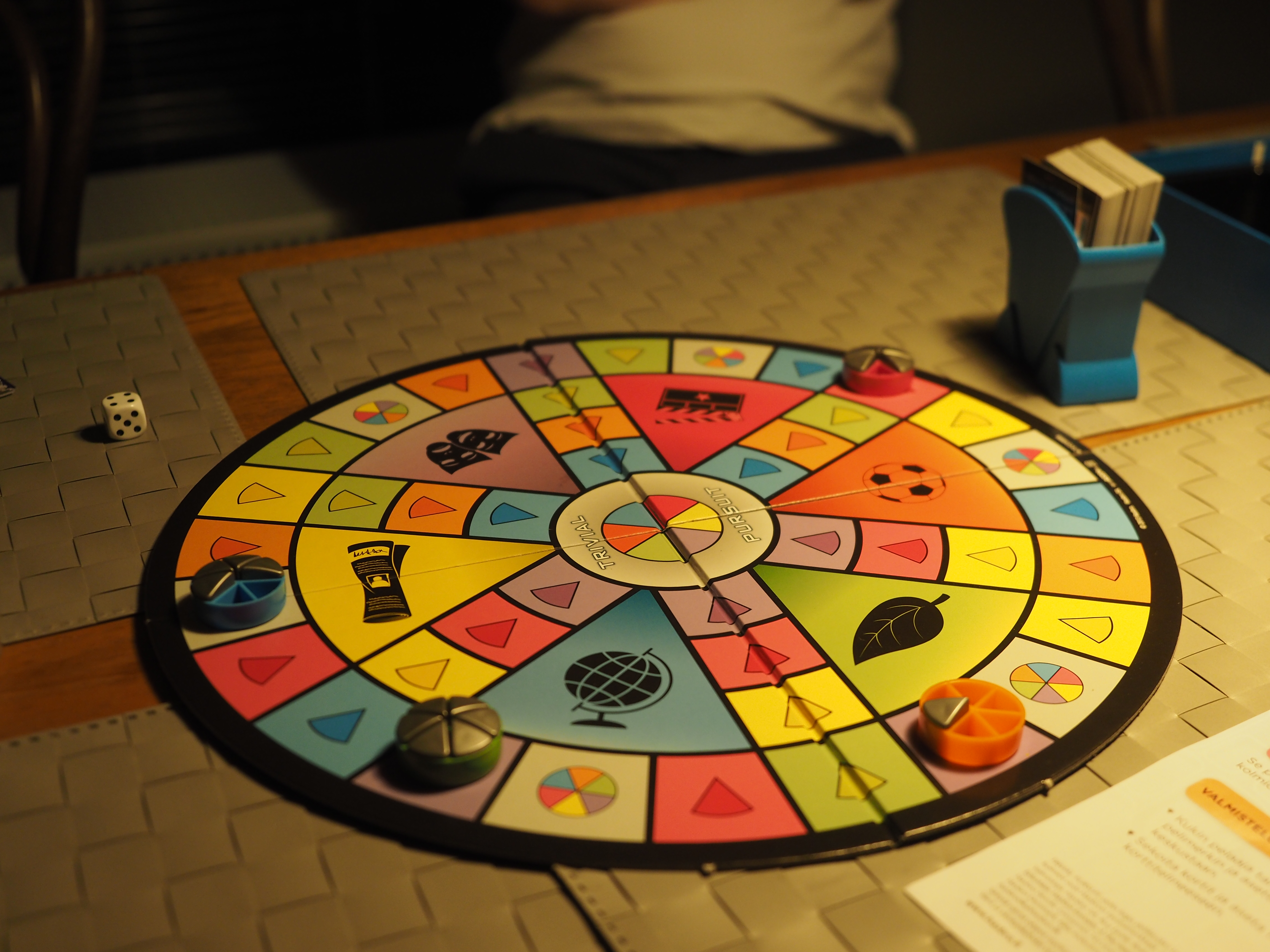
Trivial Pursuit Party is a simplified edition of Trivial Pursuit where every correct answer earns the player a wedge, thus making the game time shorter.

The Toy Insider mentioned that it can be "enjoyed by baby boomers, millennials, and everyone in between", while Board Games Land called it "The timeless classic and the godfather of trivia games".

In a review for Issue 31 of Games, Mike Shenk stated the game's questions were "excellent in quantity, scope, and level of difficulty" but warned that "the wait between turns can be uncomfortably long." Games also included Trivial Pursuit in its Games 100 in 1982, 1983, 1984, 1985, and 1986, saying "The game's winning formula is to offer well-written, entertaining questions in a continuing flow of new categories for players of all ages and interests."

Jeux & Stratégie reviewed Trivial Pursuit (as "Remue-méninges") in Issue 28, generally praising the quality and accessibility of the game's questions, but also expressing that they are sometimes subject to doubt.

== Legal action ==
=== Worth lawsuit ===
In October 1984, Fred L. Worth, author of The Trivia Encyclopedia, Super Trivia, and Super Trivia II, filed a $300 million lawsuit against the distributors of Trivial Pursuit. He claimed that more than a quarter of the questions in the game's Genus Edition had been taken from his books, even to the point of reproducing typographical errors and deliberately placed misinformation. One of the questions in Trivial Pursuit was "What was Columbo's first name?" with the answer "Philip". That information had been fabricated to catch anyone who might try to violate his copyright.

The inventors of Trivial Pursuit acknowledged that Worth's books were among their sources, but argued that this was not improper and that facts are not protected by copyright. The district court judge agreed, ruling in favor of the Trivial Pursuit inventors. The decision was appealed, and in September 1987 the United States Court of Appeals for the Ninth Circuit upheld the ruling. Worth asked the Supreme Court of the United States to review the case, but the Court declined, denying certiorari in March 1988.

=== Wall lawsuit ===
In 1994, David Wall of Cape Breton, Nova Scotia, launched a lawsuit against the game's creators. He claimed that in the fall of 1979, he and a friend were hitchhiking near Sydney, Nova Scotia, when they were picked up by Chris Haney. Wall claimed that he told Haney about his idea for the game in detail, including the shape of the markers.

Wall's mother testified she found drawings of his that looked like plans for a Trivial Pursuit-like game, but the drawings had since been destroyed. Wall's friend, who was allegedly hitchhiking with him that day, never testified. Haney said he never met Wall.

Over the years, there was much legal wrangling, notably around whether the suit should be decided by a judge or jury. On June 25, 2007, the Nova Scotia Supreme Court ruled against Wall.

== Adaptations ==
=== Television ===
A version of Trivial Pursuit, hosted by Wink Martindale, aired on The Family Channel in the United States from 1993 to 1994 (Jay Wolpert had attempted a pilot in 1987, but it was not picked up). A syndicated version entitled Trivial Pursuit: America Plays aired from 2008 to 2009 and hosted by Christopher Knight. In September 2004, Roger Lodge hosted a sports trivia game show on ESPN entitled ESPN Trivial Pursuit, which aired five episodes. A new version of the game premiered on October 3, 2024, on The CW hosted by LeVar Burton.

BBC Television produced a Trivial Pursuit game show based on the game in the UK hosted by Rory McGrath. Another British version (with rules/format similar to the Wink Martindale version, and also using the same theme tune as the Wink Martindale version) was hosted on The Family Channel (now Challenge) by Tony Slattery.

In 1991, a local version was aired in Austria, hosted by Bernadette Schneider on ORF.

In Germany, Birgit Lechtermann hosted a local version for VOX from 1993 to 1994.

In 1988, a made-for-television movie entitled Breaking all the Rules: The Creation of Trivial Pursuit aired. Treated largely as a comedy, the movie featured the music of Jimmy Buffett and portrayed the creators of the game as three beer-loving Canadians. The actors were Gordon Clapp as John Haney, Malcolm Stewart as Chris Haney and Bruce Pirrie as Scott Abbott.

In Spain, a version of the show called Trivial Pursuit was aired in 2011 and presented by Silvia Jato on Veo7.

The Soviet Union in 1989 bought the rights to produce its own version of the board game, and also started an official championship for family teams, finals of which were broadcast on Soviet Central Television as the game show Lucky Case (russian: Счастливый случай). After the agreement ended in 1991, the show changed their rules, dropping Trivial Pursuit elements, and continued broadcasting until 2000.

=== Arcade game ===
In 1984, Bally Sente released a Trivial Pursuit arcade game. Like the board game, several variants were also subsequently released.

=== Home computer games ===
British software company Domark released a home computer version (billed as Trivial Pursuit: The Computer Game) for multiple formats during the 1980s. This version included pictorial and musical questions but was otherwise mostly faithful to the mechanics of the original board game.

Later, Domark released another version called Trivial Pursuit: A New Beginning, also across multiple formats. This version featured a plot about the dying Earth and significantly altered gameplay mechanics.

Hasbro Interactive released a "Millennium Edition" in 1999 with three different modes, and different categories:

- Classic Pursuit: Played just like the board game. A "QUICKPLAY" option was also available, where, to speed the game up, every question would be a wedge question. Up to six can play. The winner is the first one to earn all six wedges, land back in the center hub by exact count, and then give a correct answer.
- Party Pursuit: Up to three can play. The computer randomly spins categories until there are three to choose from. A correct answer by the first player to buzz in earns the wedge; a wrong answer gives the opposition a chance, as well as take away any wedges earned in a category. The first player to earn all six wedges wins the game. After 20 questions, the computer begins selecting categories for the players.
- Point Pursuit: Same as Party Pursuit, except point scores are kept, and questions range from 250 to 1,000 points. Players can also wager any or all of their scores on one final question. Bonus points are earned for a wedge and for how much or how little time it took to answer a question.

There are also three different ways to answer the questions:

- Multiple choice, where players choose from numbers 1, 2, 3, or 4;
- Spelling accuracy: loose, where imperfect spelling is accepted by the program;
- Spelling accuracy: strict, where spelling must be precise.

This game featured a total of seven voice-overs, one host, and one for each of the six categories: People & Places (blue wedge), Arts & Entertainment (pink wedge), History (yellow wedge), Science & Nature (brown wedge), Sports & Leisure (green wedge), and Wild Card (orange wedge).

=== Online games ===
In 1999, Sony Online Entertainment licensed Trivial Pursuit from Hasbro Interactive to release a downloadable online game on The Station@Sony (home to Everquest at the time), where up to three auto-matched players could chat with each other live while they played. A correct answer on any space earned a wedge on the category answered, the wedge spaces gave the player their choice of category, and the first person to earn four wedges was the winner. It was hosted on The Station until 2001.

In 2003, Bolenka Games released an online game of Trivial Pursuit on the now-defunct website Uproar.com where it features five editions such as: Genus, Silver Screen, Music, 1980s and TV.

=== Video games ===
Trivial Pursuit was released for a number of home video systems, including Sega CD, Wii, Windows Phone, Xbox 360, Xbox One, PlayStation 2 and PlayStation 3. The board game was also adapted into a mobile game called Trivia Crack as well as Trivial Pursuit Genus Edition for the Nokia 3650, 6600, N-Gage, and Siemens SX1.

Atari Interactive released Trivial Pursuit: Unhinged for the PlayStation 2, Xbox, and Windows in 2004.

Ubisoft released Trivial Pursuit: Live!, on 17 December 2014 for Xbox 360 and PlayStation 3, on 18 February 2015 for Xbox One and PlayStation 4. It is similar to the Buzz! series. On Xbox One and PS4, it is a part from the Hasbro Game Channel, and it was released in physical on the Hasbro Family Fun Pack compilation on 25 October 2016. It was ported on 30 October 2018 on Nintendo Switch, for the Hasbro Game Night compilation in physical or individually for download. A sequel called Trivial Pursuit Live! 2, published by Ubisoft and developed by Snap Finger Click, was released in 2022 for PlayStation 4, Xbox One, Nintendo Switch, and Stadia.

Trivial Pursuit was also adapted into a featured game on the NTN system of video-bar-trivia games. The game ran during the early 2000s.
