= 1937 Kentucky Derby =

Horse race

63rd Kentucky Derby
- Kentucky Derby
- Grade I stakes race
- Location: Churchill Downs
- Date: May 8, 1937
- Winning horse: War Admiral
- Jockey: Charles Kurtsinger
- Trainer: George Conway
- Owner: Glen Riddle Farm
- Surface: Dirt

The 1937 Kentucky Derby was the 63rd running of the Kentucky Derby. The race took place on May 8, 1937.

== Full results ==
Finished	Post	Horse	Jockey	Trainer	Owner	Time / behind
1st		War Admiral	Charles Kurtsinger	George Conway	Glen Riddle Farm	2:03 1/5
2nd		Pompoon	Harry C. Richards	Cyrus Field Clarke	Jerome Louchheim	
3rd		Reaping Reward	Alfred M. Robertson	Robert V. McGarvey	Milky Way Farm Stable	
4th		Melodist	Johnny Longden	James E. Fitzsimmons	Wheatley Stable	
5th		Sceneshifter	James Stout	Earl Sande	Maxwell Howard	
6th		Heelfly	Wayne D. Wright	Jack R. Pryce	Three D's Stock Farm	
7th		Dellor	Basil James	John M. Goode	James W. Parrish	
8th		Burning Star	Charles Parke	John J. Greely Sr.	Shandon Farm (Patrick A. & Richard J. Nash)	
9th		Court Scandal	Earl Steffen	Walter Burrows	Townsend B. Martin	
10th		Clodion	Irving Anderson	Walter A. Carter	Walter A. Carter	
11th		Fairy Hill	Maurice Peters	Richard E. Handlen	Foxcatcher Farms	
12th		Merry Maker	Hilton Dabson	Willie A. Shea	Miss E. G. Rand	
13th		No Sir	Hubert Leblanc	Mary Hirsch	Mary Hirsch	
14th		Grey Gold	Joseph Rosen	George R. Miller	Edward W. Duffy	
15th		Military	Charles Corbett	Robert V. McGarvey	Milky Way Farm Stable	
16th		Sunset Trail	Robert Dotter	George Walsh	Raoul Walsh	
17th		Fencing	Jack Westrope	Earl Sande	Maxwell Howard	
18th		Bernard F.	Lee Hardy	Al Miller	Isaac Jacob Collins	
19th		Sir Damion	Edward Yager	George M. Odom	Marshall Field III	
20th		Billionaire	George Woolf	Herbert J. Thompson	Edward R. Bradley	

- Winning breeder: Samuel D. Riddle (KY)
