= Rhode Island Handicap =

- Class: Discontinued horse
- Location: Narragansett Park; Pawtucket, Rhode Island, United States
- Inaugurated: 1934-1948
- Race type: Thoroughbred - Flat racing

Race information
- Distance: 1 3/16 miles (9.5 furlongs)
- Surface: Dirt
- Track: left-handed
- Qualification: Three-years-old & up
- Weight: Handicap
- Purse: $10,000

The Rhode Island Handicap was an American Thoroughbred horse race run annually at Narragansett Park in Pawtucket, Rhode Island from 1934 to 1948. The race was designed to be the closing day feature of the tracks very first meet. The handicap event was given a $10,000 purse, the largest of the meet. Older handicap horses were the racing stars of the day and the Rhode Island Handicap was to be the track's signature race.

The first Rhode Island Handicap run at Narragansett Park was on closing day, September 3, 1934. With its purse of $10,000 added it drew a solid field. Future National Museum of Racing and Hall of Fame inductee Discovery set the World Record for 1 3/16 miles in the time of 1:55. Alfred G. Vanderbilt II was lured to run his top horse at 'Gansett when track management bumped the purse to 15k added just days before the event. Discovery's time would stand as the track record until 1946.

The attendance figure of 53,922 that crammed the track that Labor Day is still a record for any sporting event held in Rhode Island.

However, the popularity of the racing action in that first summer of 1934 led to the creation of the Narragansett Special which was placed the end of a second fall meeting. The Special was scheduled for 10/31 1934. This race, with a 25 thousand-dollar purse and run at the same 1 3/16 miles distance, was destined to be 'Gansett's biggest race every year.

The first three editions of the RI 'Cap were run at the 1 3/16 miles distance.

The 1937 race was cancelled when Narragansett Park was closed because of the “Race Track War” that fall. When the race returned in 1938, it had been shortened to 1 1/8 miles and would run at that distance for its duration.

The November 12, 1938, race would see a visit from another Hall of Fame member. War Admiral had been fairly defeated by Seabiscuit in their famous match race at Pimlico Race Course just 11 days earlier. Owner Samuel D. Riddle chose the Rhode Island Handicap for the star's next race. War Admiral did not disappoint the huge crowd of 40,000 that showed up that day. He held a 2 1/2 lengths advantage under the wire while being eased by jockey Charley Kurtsinger. It was his last stakes victory.

The race continued to be a top handicap event on the New England racing circuit until 1947. That year the entire Autumn stakes program was eliminated. Even the Narragansett Special was not run in 1947. An outbreak of "Swamp Fever" — or Equine Infectious Anemia (EIA) in the summer had caused the death of 77 horses at Rockingham Park. This greatly restricted the inter-state shipping of horses that Fall. Without the best horses shipping, the best races were eliminated from the racing book.

In 1948, the RI Handicap returned with its 10k added purse. War Trophy, bred by Samuel D. Riddle out of his Man o' War mare Racing Colors, became the last winner of the Rhode Island Handicap at Narragansett Park. The Providence Stakes, a race restricted to 3 year olds, was chosen to see an increased purse and gained the position of 2nd biggest race at 'Gansett.

A 1951 edition of the Rhode Island Handicap was scheduled for the years' final day, but was cancelled when only three horses entered.

Lincoln Downs – a nearby 13/16th mile track that opened on July 7, 1947 – ran a 7.5 furlong race named the Rhode Island Handicap in 1959. It was won by Rose's Gem with, the popular local legend, Charlie Boy second.

== Winners ==
Year	Winner	Age	Jockey	Trainer	Owner	Dist. (Miles)	Time
1948	War Trophy	6	Mike Caffarella	Charles Gribbin	Mimosa Stock Farm	1 3/16 M	1:51.40
1947	no race						
1946	Man O' Glory	4	Arnold Kirkland	George E. Roberts	Robert S. Howard	1 3/16 M	1:50.80
1945	Spangled Game	4	Ray Ranum	Ray Metcalf	Mrs Ray Metcalf	1 3/16 M	1:54.80
1944	Goober Lad	8	Hubie Trent	Ray Metcalf	Metcalf & Carr	1 3/16 M	1:51.60
1943	Devalue	5	Marcus Pena	J. J. Johnson	Henry H. Haag	1 3/16 M	1:52.40
1942	No Competition	6	Warren E. Snyder	Hurst Philpot	B. B. Robinson	1 3/16 M	1:52.00
1941	The Finest	4	Tommy Luther	R. Carl Utz	Glen Riddle Farm	1 3/16 M	1:51.80
1940	Confiado	7	Albert Schmidl	Hirsch Jacobs	Isadore Bieber	1 3/16 M	1:52.00
1939	Gridiron	3	Walter Taylor	Paul L. Kelley	Paul L. Kelley	1 3/16 M	1:51.00
1938	War Admiral	4	Charley Kurtsinger	George Conway	Glen Riddle Farm	1 3/16 M	1:51.40
1937	no race						
1936	Roustabout	5	Charlie Stevenson	T. J. Healey	Cornelius Vanderbilt Whitney	1 3/16 M	1:58.00
1935	Dark Hope	6	Mark Winters	Louis Feustel	J. W. Y. Martin	1 3/16 M	1:59.40
1934	Discovery	3	John Bejshak	Joseph H. Stotler	Alfred G. Vanderbilt II	1 3/16 M	1:55.00 (NWR)
