= Gwyn R. Tompkins =

American Thoroughbred horse trainer and owner

Gwyn Tompkins
Personal information
- Born: 1861 United States
- Died: November 26, 1938 (aged 76–77)
- Occupation: Trainer

Horse racing career
- Sport: Horse racing
- Career wins: Not found

Major racing wins
- Beverwyck Steeplechase Handicap (1905); Meadow Brook Hunters' Trial (1905); Bayside Steeplechase (1907); Daisy Stakes (1909); Pimlico Autumn Handicap (1922); Washington Handicap (1922, 1924); Grand Union Hotel Stakes (1923); Interborough Handicap (1924); Geyser Handicap (1924); Champlain Handicap (1925); Clover Stakes (1925); Dwyer Stakes (1925); Fashion Stakes (1925); Keene Memorial Stakes (1925); Manor Handicap (1925); Matron Stakes (1925); Withers Stakes (1925); Harbor Hill Steeplechase (1926); Catskill Stakes (1931) American Classic Race wins: American Grand National (1910); Belmont Stakes (1925)

Racing awards
- United States Champion Thoroughbred Trainer by earnings (1925)

Significant horses
- American Flag, Friar's Carse, Maid at Arms

Gwyn R. Tompkins (1861 – November 26, 1938) was an American Thoroughbred horse racing trainer and owner in both steeplechase and flat racing.

Tompkins owned and trained Rossfenton who in 1910 won the most prestigious steeplechase event in the United States, the American Grand National. Fifteen years later he gained national prominence in flat racing when he took over from Louis Feustel in 1923 as head trainer for Sam Riddle's famous Glen Riddle Farm.

While training for Riddle, 1925 Gwyn Tompkins accomplished something extraordinary in Thoroughbred racing when he conditioned the American Champion Two-Year-Old Filly (Friar's Carse), the American Champion Three-Year-Old Filly (Maid at Arms), and the American Champion Three-Year-Old Male Horse (American Flag). In addition, that same year Tompkins prepared the then two-year-old Crusader who would earn 1926 American Champion Three-Year-Old Male Horse and Horse of the Year honors. For 1925, Gwyn Tompkins was the United States Champion Thoroughbred Trainer by earnings.

A story in the November 1, 1925 issue of the Chicago Daily Tribune was headlined: America's Leading Race Trainer Near Death at Laurel. Tompkins recovered from his illness, but five weeks later The New York Times reported that he had resigned as trainer for Glen Riddle Farm due to his health problems. However, he soon signed on with Isabel Dodge Sloane, heiress and owner of Brookmeade Stable. For Mrs. Sloane, he trained horses that won in both steeplechase and flat racing.

A resident of Warrenton, Virginia where Mrs. Sloan maintained her stable, in November 1938 the then seventy-seven-year-old Gwyn Tompkins took a heavy fall on ice and died in hospital as a result of his injuries.
