= Washington Handicap =

- Class: Discontinued stakes
- Location: Laurel Park; Laurel, Maryland, USA
- Inaugurated: 1911-1951
- Race type: Thoroughbred - Flat racing

Race information
- Distance: 1¼ miles (10 furlongs)
- Surface: Dirt
- Track: Left-handed
- Qualification: Three-years-old & older

The Washington Handicap was an American Thoroughbred horse race run annually at Laurel Park Racecourse in Laurel, Maryland. Open to horses age three and older, it was contested on dirt over a distance of a mile and a quarter (10 furlongs).

At one time the Washington Handicap was an important event that drew many of the top horses. Winners include several U.S. Racing Hall of Fame inductees including U.S. Triple Crown champions, War Admiral and Whirlaway. Ridden by James Butwell, Roamer, another Hall of Fame inductee, set a new World Record of 1:49 3/5 in winning the 1914 edition.

The race was last run on October 20, 1951, and was won by Charles B. Bohn's gelding, Blue Hills.

== Records ==
Speed record:

- 2:02.20 @ 1¼ miles - Abstract (1950)

Most wins:

- 2 - Sun Beau (1929, 1930)

Most wins by a jockey:

- 3 - Frank Coltiletti (1926, 1929, 1930)

Most wins by a trainer:

- 2 - James G. Rowe Sr. (1915, 1923)
- 2 - Gwyn R. Tompkins (1922, 1937
- 2 - William Irvine (1929, 1932)
- 2 - Gwyn R. Tompkins (1942, 1945)

Most wins by an owner:

- 3 - Glen Riddle Farm (1922, 1924, 1937)
- 3 - Walter M. Jeffords Sr. (1926, 1935, 1947)

== Winners ==
Year	Winner	Age	Jockey	Trainer	Owner	Dist. (Miles)	Time
1951	Blue Hills	5	Lois C. Cook	Roy B. Dickman	Charles B. Bohn	1 1/4	2:02.80
1950	Abstract	4	Edward Campbell	Jerry McNally	Louis J. Shaw	1 1/4	2:02.20
1949	High Trend	5	Abelardo DeLara	Albert F. East	Samuel Greenfield	1 1/4	2:04.40
1948	Quarter Pole	3	N. L. Pierson	Michael E. Millerick	Frank Frankel	1 1/4	2:03.60
1947	Loyal Legion	3	Albert Snider	Oscar White	Walter M. Jeffords Sr.	1 1/4	2:03.40
1946	Seven Hearts	6	William Hanka	W. Graves Sparks	J. Graham Brown	1 1/4	2:03.00
1945	Armed	4	Douglas Dodson	Ben A. Jones	Calumet Farm	1 1/4	2:04.40
1944	Megogo	3	Ken Scawthorn	John A. Healey	Christiana Stable	1 1/4	2:06.00
1943	Anticlimax	4	Nick Jemas	Kenneth Osborne	Hal Price Headley	1 3/16	1:58.00
1942	Whirlaway	3	George Woolf	Ben A. Jones	Calumet Farm	1 1/4	2:03.40
1941	Pictor	4	George Woolf	Frank Walker	William L. Brann	1 1/4	2:03.40
1940	Can't Wait	5	Alfred Robertson	J. Thomas Taylor	Myron Selznick	1 1/4	2:05.00
1939	Masked General	5	Nick Wall	William Mulholland	Brandywine Stable	1 1/4	2:05.40
1938	Jacola	3	Johnny Leyland	Selby L. Burch	Nancy Carr Friendly	1 1/4	2:06.00
1937	War Admiral	3	Charles Kurtsinger	George H. Conway	Glen Riddle Farm	1 1/4	2:04.80
1936	Roman Soldier	4	Jack Westrope	Phil Reuter	Elwood Sachsenmaier & Phil Reuter	1 1/4	2:02.60
1935	Firethorn	3	Harry Richards	Preston M. Burch	Walter M. Jeffords Sr.	1 1/4	2:02.60
1934	Azucar	6	Raymond Workman	Alexis G. Wilson	Frederick M. Alger Jr.	1 1/4	2:02.40
1933	Dark Secret	4	Hank Mills	James E. Fitzsimmons	Wheatley Stable	1 1/4	2:02.80
1932	Tred Avon	4	Pat Remillard	William Irvine	Sylvester W. Labrot	1 1/4	2:05.60
1931	Clock Tower	3	Pete Walls	Max Hirsch	Morton L. Schwartz	1 1/4	2:04.20
1930	Sun Beau	5	Frank Coltiletti	William A. Crawford	Willis Sharpe Kilmer	1 1/4	2:02.80
1929	Sun Beau	4	Frank Coltiletti	William Irvine	Willis Sharpe Kilmer	1 1/4	2:02.80
1928	Mike Hall	4	Lawrence McDermott	Walter W. Taylor	Hal Price Headley	1 1/4	2:03.60
1927	Display	4	John Maiben	Thomas J. Healey	Walter J. Salmon Sr.	1 1/4	2:02.40
1926	Mars	3	Frank Coltiletti	Robert A. Smith	Walter M. Jeffords Sr.	1 1/4	2:03.00
1925	Joy Smoke	4	James Butwell	James W. Healy	Edward F. Whitney	1 1/4	2:09.80
1924	Big Blaze	3	Ivan Parke	Gwyn R. Tompkins	Glen Riddle Farm	1 1/4	2:04.20
1923	Rialto	3	Linus McAtee	James G. Rowe Sr.	Greentree Stable	1 1/4	2:04.00
1922	Oceanic	3	Benny Marinelli	Gwyn R. Tompkins	Glen Riddle Farm	1 1/4	2:04.80
1919	1921	Race not held					
1918	Midway	4	Harold Thurber	John S. Ward	James W. Parrish	1 1/8	1:51.40
1917	King Neptune	4	Roscoe Troxler	B. B. Larrick	John S. Tyree	1 1/8	1:59.00
1916	Boots	5	Charles Fairbrother	Walter C. Jennings	Oscar Lewisohn	1 1/8	1:51.20
1915	Gainer	4	Tommy McTaggart	James G. Rowe Sr.	Greentree Stable	1 1/4	2:04.60
1914	Roamer	3	James Butwell	A. J. Goldsborough	Andrew Miller	1 1/8	1:49.60
1913	Lahore	5	Charles Burlingame	Walter S. House	John O. Talbott	1 1/8	1:54.00
1912	The Manager	3	George Byrne	Thomas C. McDowell	Thomas C. McDowell	1 1/8	1:51.80
1911	Sir John Johnson	6	Phil Goldstein	David Woodford	Beverwyck Stable	1 1/8	1:55.00
