= Dwyer Stakes =

- Class: Listed
- Location: Belmont Park; Elmont, New York, United States
- Inaugurated: 1887
- Race type: Thoroughbred – Flat racing

Race information
- Distance: 1 Mile
- Surface: Dirt
- Track: left-handed
- Qualification: Three-year-olds
- Weight: 124 lbs. with allowances
- Purse: $200,000

The Dwyer Stakes is an American Listed stakes race for three-year-old thoroughbred racehorses held annually in November at Belmont Park in Elmont, New York. Run in early November, it is open to three-year-old horses and is raced over a distance of 1 mile on dirt. It currently offers a purse of $200,000.

Inaugurated in 1887 as the Brooklyn Derby at the now defunct Gravesend Race Track on Coney Island, in 1918 it was renamed for the Dwyer brothers, Mike & Phil, who dominated thoroughbred racing in the late 19th century. At one time, it was a Grade I stakes race that was a major part of the American Thoroughbred racing season. It was known as the Dwyer Handicap from 1957 to 1978.

Since inception, the race has been contested at various distances:

- 1 mile : 2015 to present
- 1 1/16 miles – 1887–1924, 1935–1939, 1994 to 2014
- 1 1/8 miles – 1888–1897, 1915–1924, 1935–1939, 1975–1993, 2010
- 1 3/16 miles – 1956–1959
- 1 1/4 miles – 1910–1914, 1925, 1940–1955, 1960–1974
- 1 5/16 miles – 1925
- 1 1/2 miles – 1887, 1898–1909, 1926–1934

The race has been held at:

- Gravesend Race Track – 1887–1910
- Aqueduct Racetrack – 1913–1955, 1960–1974, 1976, 2024, 2025
- Jamaica Race Course – 1956, 1958, 1959
- Belmont Park – 1957, 1975, 1977–2023, 2026–present

In 1908 Fair Play was the first of three generations to win the Dwyer. His son, Man o' War, won it in 1920; and Man o' War's sons American Flag and Crusader won it in 1925 and 1926, respectively. The 1920 Dwyer turned into a match race when the owner of John P. Grier was the only one willing to run their horse against Man o' War. However, confronting John P. Grier proved to be one of his hardest races. The two horses raced head-to-head for most of the distance until John P. Grier put his nose in front at the eighth pole, but Man o' War came back to win by more than a length.

This race was downgraded to a Grade III for its 2014 running.

In 2025 the event was downgraded by the Thoroughbred Owners and Breeders Association to Listed status, and the New York Racing Association moved the event to the fall.

== Records ==
Speed record: (at current one mile distance)

- 1:33.54 – Domestic Product (2024)

Most wins by a jockey:

- 6 – Jerry D. Bailey (1983, 1996, 1997, 1999, 2001, 2005)

Most wins by a trainer:

- 9 – Jim Fitzsimmons (1922, 1930, 1932, 1935, 1939, 1949, 1955, 1957, 1961)

Most wins by an owner:

- 6 – Belair Stud (1930, 1932, 1935, 1939, 1949, 1955)
- 6 – Greentree Stable (1931, 1956, 1963, 1968, 1973, 1974)

== Winners ==
Year	Winner	Jockey	Trainer	Owner	Distance	Time
2026	Stimulate	Junior Alvarado	William I. Mott	Claiborne Farm & Adele B. Dilschneider	1 mile	1:33.64
2025	Disco Time	Florent Geroux	Brad H. Cox	Juddmonte Farms	1 mile	1:33.86
2024	Domestic Product	Flavien Prat	Chad C. Brown	Klaravich Stables	1 mile	1:33.54
2023	Fort Bragg	John R. Velazquez	Bob Baffert	SF Racing, Starlight Racing, Madaket Stables, Robert E. Masterson, Stonestreet Stables, Jay A. Schoenfarber, Waves Edge Capital LLC & Catherine Donovan	1 mile	1:35.37
2022	Charge It	John R. Velazquez	Todd Pletcher	Whisper Hill Farm LLC	1 mile	1:34.67
2021	First Captain	Jose Ortiz	C. R. McGaughey III	Westpoint Thoroughbreds, Siena Farms, Bobby Flay and Woodford Racing	1 mile	1:36.19
2019	Code of Honor	John R. Velazquez	C. R. McGaughey III	William Stamps Farish III	1 mile	1:35.81
2018	Firenze Fire	Irad Ortiz Jr.	Jason Servis	Mr. Amore Stable	1 mile	1:33.74
2017	Practical Joke	Joel Rosario	Chad Brown	Klaravich Stables & William H. Lawrence	1 mile	1:35.16
2016	Fish Trappe Road	Luis Saez	W. Bret Calhoun	Martin Racing Stable	1 mile	1:34.84
2015	Speightster	Jose Lezcano	William I. Mott	WinStar Farm	1 mile	1:35.13
2014	Kid Cruz	Irad Ortiz Jr.	Linda Rice	Vina Del Mar Thoroughbreds	1 1/16	1:41.12
2013	Moreno	José Ortiz	Eric J. Guillot	Southern Equine Stable	1 1/16	1:41.07
2012	Teeth of the Dog	Joel Rosario	Michael Matz	Jose W. Singer	1 1/16	1:41.34
2011	Dominus	Julien Leparoux	Steve Asmussen	Bolton/Stonestreet Stable/Spendthrift Farm	1 1/16	1:41.74
2010	Fly Down	Jose Lezcano	Nick Zito	Richard Pell	1 1/8	1:50.25
2009	Kensei	Edgar Prado	Steve Asmussen	Stonestreet/Gulf Coast Farms	1 1/16	1:40.47
2008	Mint Lane	Eibar Coa	James A. Jerkens	Pinebloom Stable	1 1/16	1:44.29
2007	Any Given Saturday	Garrett Gomez	Todd A. Pletcher	Winstar / Padua	1 1/16	1:40.69
2006	Strong Contender	Edgar Prado	John T. Ward, Jr	John C. Oxley	1 1/16	1:45.24
2005	Roman Ruler	Jerry D. Bailey	Bob Baffert	Fog City Stable	1 1/16	1:40.83
2004	Medallist	Jorge F. Chavez	H. Allen Jerkens	Robert N. Clay	1 1/16	1:40.02
2003	Strong Hope	John R. Velazquez	Todd A. Pletcher	Eugene & Laura Melnyk	1 1/16	1:41.76
2002	Gygistar	John R. Velazquez	Mark A. Hennig	Edward P. Evans	1 1/16	1:42.59
2001	E Dubai	Jerry D. Bailey	Saeed bin Suroor	Godolphin Racing	1 1/16	1:40.38
2000	Albert the Great	Richard Migliore	Nick Zito	Tracy Farmer	1 1/16	1:42.62
1999	Forestry	Jerry D. Bailey	Bob Baffert	Aaron & Marie Jones	1 1/16	1:41.00
1998	Coronado's Quest	Mike E. Smith	C. R. McGaughey III	Stuart S. Janney III	1 1/16	1:42.49
1997	Behrens	Jerry D. Bailey	H. James Bond	W. C. Rudlein Stable	1 1/16	1:42.26
1996	Victory Speech	Jerry D. Bailey	D. Wayne Lukas	Michael Tabor	1 1/16	1:41.53
1995	Hoolie	Robbie Davis	Willard C. Freeman	R. Leahy/J. Meriwether	1 1/16	1:42.74
1994	Holy Bull	Mike E. Smith	Warren A. Croll Jr.	Warren A. Croll Jr.	1 1/16	1:41.15
1993	Cherokee Run	Pat Day	Frank A. Alexander	Jill Robinson	1 1/8	1:47.62
1992	Agincourt *	Jorge F. Chavez	Nick Zito	Robert Perez	1 1/8	1:47.84
1991	Lost Mountain	Craig Perret	Thomas Bohannan	Loblolly Stable	1 1/8	1:49.20
1990	Profit Key	José A. Santos	D. Wayne Lukas	H. Joseph Allen	1 1/8	1:47.52
1989	Roi Danzig	Eddie Maple	Woody Stephens	Henryk deKwiatkowski	1 1/8	1:49.27
1988	Seeking The Gold	Pat Day	C. R. McGaughey III	Ogden Phipps	1 1/8	1:48.00
1987	Gone West	Eddie Maple	Woody Stephens	Hickory Tree Stable	1 1/8	1:48.40
1986	Ogygian	Walter Guerra	Jan H. Nerud	Tartan Stable	1 1/8	1:48.40
1985	Stephan's Odyssey	Laffit Pincay Jr.	Woody Stephens	Henryk deKwiatkowski	1 1/8	1:49.20
1984	Track Barron	Jean Cruguet	LeRoy Jolley	Peter M. Brant	1 1/8	1:47.80
1983	Au Point	Jerry D. Bailey	James W. Maloney	Snowberry Farm	1 1/8	1:48.20
1982	Conquistador Cielo	Eddie Maple	Woody Stephens	Henryk deKwiatkowski	1 1/8	1:45.80
1981	Noble Nashua	Cash Asmussen	Jose A. Martin	Flying Zee Stable	1 1/8	1:49.20
1980	Amber Pass	Don MacBeth	Hubert Hine	Entremont	1 1/8	1:49.00
1979	Coastal	Ruben Hernandez	David A. Whiteley	William Haggin Perry	1 1/8	1:47.00
1978	Junction	Jeffrey Fell	Patrick J. Kelly	Live Oak Plantation	1 1/8	1:48.80
1977	Bailjumper	Ruben Hernandez	David A. Whiteley	Pen-Y-Bryn Farm	1 1/8	1:47.60
1976	Quiet Little Table	Eddie Maple	Philip G. Johnson	Meadowhill	1 1/8	1:49.00
1975	Valid Appeal	James Long	Thomas F. Root Sr.	Harry T. Mangurian Jr.	1 1/8	1:48.40
1974	Hatchet Man	Ron Turcotte	John M. Gaver Jr.	Greentree Stable	1 1/4	2:01.20
1973	Stop The Music	Heliodoro Gustines	John M. Gaver Sr.	Greentree Stable	1 1/4	2:02.60
1972	Cloudy Dawn	Bill Hartack	Frank Y. Whiteley Jr.	Pen-Y-Bryn Farm	1 1/4	2:03.20
1971	Jim French	Ángel Cordero Jr.	John P. Campo	See wiki article	1 1/4	2:01.60
1970	Judgable	Robert Woodhouse	Herbert Nadler	Saul Nadler	1 1/4	2:02.60
1969	Gleaming Light	Larry Adams	John P. Campo	Neil Hellman	1 1/4	2:04.00
1968	Stage Door Johnny	Heliodoro Gustines	John M. Gaver Sr.	Greentree Stable	1 1/4	2:01.60
1967	Damascus	Bill Shoemaker	Frank Y. Whiteley Jr.	Edith W. Bancroft	1 1/4	2:03.00
1966	Mr. Right	Ernest Cardone	Thomas M. Waller	Cheray Duchin	1 1/4	2:02.80
1965	Staunchness	Bobby Ussery	Pete Mosconi	Red Oak Stable	1 1/4	2:01.80
1964	Quadrangle	Manuel Ycaza	J. Elliott Burch	Rokeby Stable	1 1/4	2:01.40
1963	Outing Class	Bobby Ussery	John M. Gaver Sr.	Greentree Stable	1 1/4	2:01.60
1962	Cyane	Eldon Nelson	Henry S. Clark	Christiana Stable	1 1/4	2:01.60
1961	Hitting Away	Hedley Woodhouse	Jim Fitzsimmons	Ogden Phipps	1 1/4	2:03.80
1960	Francis S.	Paul J. Bailey	Burley Parke	Harbor View Farm	1 1/4	2:03.00
1959	Waltz	Sam Boulmetis Sr.	Max Hirsch	W. Arnold Hanger	1 3/16	1:54.80
1958	Victory Morn	Eric Guerin	Woody Stephens	Cain Hoy Stable	1 3/16	1:58.80
1957	Bureaucracy	William Boland	Jim Fitzsimmons	Ogden Phipps	1 3/16	1:55.40
1956	Riley	Ted Atkinson	John M. Gaver Sr.	Greentree Stable	1 3/16	1:57.40
1955	Nashua	Eddie Arcaro	Jim Fitzsimmons	Belair Stud	1 1/4	2:03.80
1954	High Gun	Eric Guerin	Max Hirsch	King Ranch	1 1/4	2:05.00
1953	Native Dancer	Eric Guerin	William C. Winfrey	Alfred G. Vanderbilt II	1 1/4	2:05.20
1952	Blue Man	Conn McCreary	Woody Stephens	White Oak Stable	1 1/4	2:01.80
1951	Battlefield	Eddie Arcaro	Bert Mulholland	George D. Widener Jr.	1 1/4	2:04.40
1950	Greek Song	Ovie Scurlock	Virgil W. Raines	Brandywine Stable	1 1/4	2:03.00
1949	Shackleton	R. Bernhardt	Jim Fitzsimmons	Belair Stud	1 1/4	2:07.80
1948	My Request	Ted Atkinson	James P. Conway	Ben F. Whitaker	1 1/4	2:02.00
1947	Phalanx	Ruperto Donoso	Syl Veitch	C. V. Whitney	1 1/4	2:05.00
1946	Assault	Warren Mehrtens	Max Hirsch	King Ranch	1 1/4	2:06.80
1945	Wildlife	Ted Atkinson	Andy Schuttinger	Joseph M. Roebling	1 1/4	2:05.20
1944	By Jimminy	Ted Atkinson	James W. Smith	Alfred P. Parker	1 1/4	2:03.40
1943	Vincentive	John Gilbert	Edward A. Christmas	William L. Brann	1 1/4	2:05.00
1942	Valdina Orphan	Carroll Bierman	Frank Catrone	Valdina Farms	1 1/4	2:01.40
1941	Whirlaway	Eddie Arcaro	Ben A. Jones	Calumet Farm	1 1/4	2:03.40
1940	Your Chance *	Wayne D. Wright	Jack Creevy	Mrs. G. D. Widener Jr.	1 1/4	2:03.80
1939	Johnstown	James Stout	Jim Fitzsimmons	Belair Stud	1 1/8	1:48.40
1938	The Chief	George Woolf	Earl Sande	Maxwell Howard	1 1/8	1:48.40
1937	Strabo	Sam Renick	Roy Waldron	Hope Goddard Iselin	1 1/8	1:51.40
1936	Mr. Bones	John Gilbert	John M. Gaver Sr.	John Hay Whitney	1 1/8	1:49.80
1935	Omaha	Wayne D. Wright	Jim Fitzsimmons	Belair Stud	1 1/8	1:49.20
1934	Rose Cross	Silvio Coucci	William Brennan	Manhasset Stable	1 1/2	2:32.00
1933	War Glory	John Gilbert	George Conway	Glen Riddle Farm	1 1/2	2:31.80
1932	Faireno	Thomas Malley	Jim Fitzsimmons	Belair Stud	1 1/2	2:31.40
1931	Twenty Grand	Charley Kurtsinger	James G. Rowe Jr.	Greentree Stable	1 1/2	2:34.40
1930	Gallant Fox	Earl Sande	Jim Fitzsimmons	Belair Stud	1 1/2	2:32.40
1929	Grey Coat	Steve O'Donnell	William M. Garth	Samuel Ross	1 1/2	2:34.00
1928	Genie	Willie Kelsay	Henry McDaniel	Gifford A. Cochran	1 1/2	2:31.60
1927	Kentucky II	John Maiben	Max Hirsch	A. Charles Schwartz	1 1/2	2:31.80
1926	Crusader	Earl Sande	George Conway	Glen Riddle Farm	1 1/2	2:29.60
1925	American Flag	Albert Johnson	Gwyn R. Tompkins	Glen Riddle Farm	1 5/16	2:10.60
1924	Ladkin	John Maiben	Louis Feustel	August Belmont Jr.	1 1/8	1:49.80
1923	Dunlin	Chick Lang	William M. Garth	Joshua S. Cosden	1 1/8	1:51.20
1922	Ray Jay	Clyde Ponce	Jim Fitzsimmons	Quincy Stable	1 1/8	1:52.60
1921	Grey Lag	Earl Sande	Sam Hildreth	Rancocas Stable	1 1/8	1:49.00
1920	Man o' War	Clarence Kummer	Louis Feustel	Glen Riddle Farm	1 1/8	1:49.20
1919	Purchase	Willie Knapp	Sam Hildreth	Sam Hildreth	1 1/8	1:52.60
1918	War Cloud	Merritt C. Buxton	Walter B. Jennings	A. K. Macomber	1 1/8	1:50.20
1917	Omar Khayyam	Arthur Collins	Richard F. Carmen	Wilfrid Viau	1 1/8	1:54.20
1916	Chicle	Thomas McTaggart	James G. Rowe Sr.	Harry Payne Whitney	1 1/8	1:51.60
1915	Norse King	James Butwell	Max Hirsch	Frederick B. Lemaire	1 1/8	1:54.00
1914	Roamer	James Butwell	A. J. Goldsborough	Andrew Miller	1 1/4	2:05.60
1913	Rock View	Thomas McTaggart	Louis Feustel	August Belmont Jr.	1 1/4	2:07.60
1912	no race					
1911	no race					
1910	Dalmatian	Carroll Shilling	Sam Hildreth	Sam Hildreth	1 1/4	2:07.00
1909	Joe Madden	Eddie Dugan	Sam Hildreth	Sam Hildreth	1 1/2	2:37.80
1908	Fair Play	Eddie Dugan	A. Jack Joyner	August Belmont Jr.	1 1/2	2:37.80
1907	Peter Pan	Walter Miller	James G. Rowe Sr.	James R. Keene	1 1/2	2:41.00
1906	Belmere	Frank O'Neill	Fred Burlew	Fred Burlew	1 1/2	2:37.00
1905	Cairngorm	Willie Davis	A. Jack Joyner	Sydney Paget	1 1/2	2:34.60
1904	Bryn Mawr	Lucien Lyne	W. Fred Presgrave	Goughacres Stable (B. Frank Clyde & Thomas C. Clyde)	1 1/2	2:35.00
1903	Whorler	Frank O'Neill	John E. Madden	H. P. Whitney & H. B. Duryea	1 1/2	2:39.20
1902	Major Daingerfield	Matthew M. Allen	George M. Odom	F. C. McLewee & Co.	1 1/2	2:37.00
1901	Bonnibert	Henry Spencer	Thomas Welsh	Frank Farrell	1 1/2	2:33.80
1900	Petruchio	Henry Spencer	James G. Rowe Sr.	James R. & Foxhall P. Keene	1 1/2	2:34.00
1899	Ahom	H. Martin	Walter C. Jennings	George E. Smith	1 1/2	2:36.00
1898	The Huguenot	Henry Spencer	James G. Rowe Sr.	L. S. & W. P. Thompsom	1 1/2	2:39.25
1897	Octagon	Willie Simms	John J. Hyland	August Belmont Jr.	1 1/8	2:10.75
1896	Handspring	Samuel Doggett	Frank McCabe	Philip J. Dwyer	1 1/8	2:10.50
1895	Keenan	Henry Griffin	John J. Hyland	John Daly	1 1/8	2:10.50
1894	Dobbins	Willie Simms	Hardy Campbell Jr.	Richard Croker	1 1/8	2:14.50
1893	Rainbow	Fred Littlefield	R. Wyndham Walden	J. A. & A. H. Morris	1 1/8	2:09.25
1892	Patron	William Hayward	Lewis Stuart	Lewis Stuart	1 1/8	2:10.25
1891	Russell	George Taylor	R. Wyndham Walden	J. A. & A. H. Morris	1 1/8	2:10.00
1890	Burlington	Shelby Barnes	Albert Cooper	Hough Brothers	1 1/8	2:12.75
1889	Cynosure	William Fitzpatrick	John Moran	David D. Withers	1 1/8	2:10.50
1888	Emperor of Norfolk	Isaac Murphy	Robert W. Thomas	E. J. "Lucky" Baldwin	1 1/8	2:08.75
1887	Hanover	Jim McLaughlin	Frank McCabe	Dwyer Brothers Stable	1 1/2	2:43.50

* In 1940, Snow Ridge finished first, but was disqualified.
* In 1992, Three Peat finished first but was disqualified and set back to second.
