= Code of Honor (horse) =

American thoroughbred racehorse

- Sire: Noble Mission
- Grandsire: Galileo
- Dam: Reunited
- Damsire: Dixie Union
- Sex: Stallion
- Foaled: May 23, 2016
- Died: December 23, 2022 (aged 6)
- Country: United States
- Color: Chestnut
- Breeder: William S. Farish III
- Owner: William S. Farish III
- Trainer: Claude R. McGaughey III
- Record: 13:6-2-3
- Earnings: $2,473,320

Major wins
- Fountain of Youth Stakes (2019); Dwyer Stakes (2019); Jockey Club Gold Cup (2019); Travers Stakes (2019); Westchester Stakes (2020)

Code of Honor (May 23, 2016 – December 23, 2022) was an American Thoroughbred racehorse who won the 2019 Dwyer Stakes, Travers Stakes, and Jockey Club Gold Cup, and came second in the 2019 Kentucky Derby. He was euthanized on December 23, 2022, following an inoperable bout of colic.

== Racing career ==
=== 2018: Two-year-old season ===
Code of Honor won his debut on 18 August 2018 at Saratoga Racecourse, and then came second in the Grade 1 Champagne Stakes on October 6. He stumbled at the beginning of the race but mounted a comeback.

=== 2019: Three-year-old season ===
On 5 January 2019, Code of Honor came in fifth in the Mucho Macho Man Stakes, then rebounded to win the Grade 2 Fountain of Youth Stakes on March 2, where he defeated future Grade 1 winning sprinter Vekoma. His jockey John Velazquez called it an impressive win.

He then came in third in the Grade 1 Florida Derby on March 30 and second in the Grade 1 Kentucky Derby on May 4. He crossed the finish line third but was placed second after the disqualification of the winner, Maximum Security.

His trainer Claude McGaughey had planned for Code of Honor to take a break if he did not win the Kentucky Derby, and he returned after the time off to win three graded stakes. First was the Grade 3 Dwyer Stakes on July 6.

Code of Honor then won the two biggest races of his career, the first being the Grade 1 Travers Stakes on August 24. He won a stretch duel over three-time Grade 2 winner Tacitus and future Grade 1 winner Mucho Gusto at 4:1 odds.

On September 28, he won the Grade 1 Jockey Club Gold Cup over older horses after original winner Vino Rosso was disqualified. After his two Grade 1 wins, Code of Honor became one of the leading three-year-olds.

His last race of his three-year-old season was the Grade 1 Breeders' Cup Classic on November 2. Code of Honor came seventh at 4:1 odds behind the winner, Vino Rosso.

=== 2020: Four-year-old season ===
Code of Honor won his first start as a four-year-old in the Grade 2 Westchester Stakes on June 6.

He then placed in four graded stakes races, starting with the Grade 1 Metropolitan Handicap on July 4 where he started with odds of 5:2 and finished third behind the winner Vekoma. He followed up with a fourth-place finish in the Grade 1 Whitney Stakes behind the four time Grade 1 winner Improbable.

He finished his four-year-old season with second-place finishes in both the Grade 2 Kelso Handicap on September 3 and Grade 1 Clark Stakes on October 27.

=== 2021: Five-year-old season ===
Code of Honor started his five-year-old season with a fifth-place finish in the Grade 1 Pegasus World Cup on 2 January 2021, which was won by three time Grade 1 winner Knicks Go who had previously won the Breeders' Cup Mile.

Code of Honor had a break and is possible to make a comeback on August 4 in the Grade 1 Jockey Club Gold Cup or August 21 in the Grade 3 Philip H. Iselin Stakes.

Code of Honor was euthanized in December 2022 after an inoperable bout of colic. (Bloodhorse)

== Pedigree ==
Pedigree of Code of Honor (USA), 2016
Sire Noble Mission (GB) b. 2009	Galileo (IRE) b. 1998	Sadler's Wells	Northern Dancer
Sire Noble Mission (GB) b. 2009	Galileo (IRE) b. 1998	Sadler's Wells	Fairy Bridge
Sire Noble Mission (GB) b. 2009	Galileo (IRE) b. 1998	Urban Sea	Miswaki
Sire Noble Mission (GB) b. 2009	Galileo (IRE) b. 1998	Urban Sea	Allegretta
Sire Noble Mission (GB) b. 2009	Kind (IRE) b. 2001	Danehill	Danzig
Sire Noble Mission (GB) b. 2009	Kind (IRE) b. 2001	Danehill	Razyana
Sire Noble Mission (GB) b. 2009	Kind (IRE) b. 2001	Rainbow Lake	Rainbow Quest
Sire Noble Mission (GB) b. 2009	Kind (IRE) b. 2001	Rainbow Lake	Rockfest
Dam Reunited (USA) b. 2002	Dixie Union (USA) b. 1997	Dixieland Band	Northern Dancer
Dam Reunited (USA) b. 2002	Dixie Union (USA) b. 1997	Dixieland Band	Mississippi Mud
Dam Reunited (USA) b. 2002	Dixie Union (USA) b. 1997	She's Tops	Capote
Dam Reunited (USA) b. 2002	Dixie Union (USA) b. 1997	She's Tops	She's a Talent
Dam Reunited (USA) b. 2002	Tivli (USA) b. 1988	Mt. Livermore	Blushing Groom
Dam Reunited (USA) b. 2002	Tivli (USA) b. 1988	Mt. Livermore	Flama Ardiente
Dam Reunited (USA) b. 2002	Tivli (USA) b. 1988	Bold Boston	Bold Forbes
Dam Reunited (USA) b. 2002	Tivli (USA) b. 1988	Bold Boston	Faneuil Hall
