= Jockey Club Gold Cup =

- Class: Grade I
- Location: Belmont Park; Elmont, New York, United States
- Inaugurated: 1919
- Race type: Thoroughbred – Flat racing
- Website: www.nyra.com

Race information
- Distance: 1 1/4 miles (10 furlongs)
- Surface: Dirt
- Track: Left-handed
- Qualification: Three-years-old and up
- Weight: Weight-For-Age
- Purse: $1,000,000 (2026)

The Jockey Club Gold Cup (previously the Jockey Club Stakes) is a thoroughbred flat race held in September at Belmont Park in Elmont, New York. Inaugurated in 1919, it is open to horses of either gender three-years-old and up. Part of the Breeders' Cup Challenge series, the winner of the Jockey Club Gold Cup automatically qualifies for the Breeders' Cup Classic.

Since its inception, the Jockey Club Gold Cup has primarily been run at Belmont Park as the main event of its fall meeting. The exceptions were all but two runnings between 1958 and 1974, when the race was held at Aqueduct Racetrack, and from 2021 to 2025, when it was run at Saratoga Race Course. It was announced that the 2026 running of the race would return to Belmont Park, which was scheduled to reopen for live racing after several years of track and building reconstruction projects.

The past winners of the Gold Cup are a who's who of award-winning Hall of Fame horses, including Easy Goer, Man o' War, Cigar, Skip Away, Curlin, Slew o' Gold, John Henry, Affirmed, Forego, Shuvee, Damascus, Buckpasser, Kelso, Sword Dancer, Nashua, Citation, Whirlaway and War Admiral.

Kelso won the Jockey Club Gold Cup in five consecutive years from 1960 to 1964, when the race was run at Aqueduct. Ten horses have won the race twice, including Curlin, Skip Away, Slew o' Gold, Nashua, and Triple Tiara winner Shuvee.

In 1920, Man o' War won the Jockey Club Stakes against the only horse willing to race him. Damask, owned by Harry Payne Whitney, was entered as a sporting gesture and to keep Man o' War from having to run alone in a "walkover." Damask finished 15 lengths behind, with Man o' War held under strong restraint in order not to humiliate his rival. Even so, Man o' War broke the American record for a mile and a half.

In the 1978 running, Exceller defeated the previous year's Triple Crown winner, Seattle Slew, by a nose in a memorable stretch duel, with the 1978 Triple Crown winner, Affirmed, finishing fifth after his saddle slipped. Sportswriter Bill Nack wrote, "Exceller won by the snip of his chocolate nose. ... That battling final furlong remains Seattle Slew's most enduring legacy as a racehorse."

From 1976 to 1989, the Jockey Club Gold Cup was run at 1 1/2 miles, but from 1921 through 1975 it was two miles (3.2 km) long, second in distance only to the less prestigious, 2 1/4-mile Display Handicap.

== Records ==
Time record: (at current 1 1/4 miles)

- 1:58.89 – Skip Away (1997)

Most wins:

- 5 – Kelso (1960, 1961, 1962, 1963, 1964)

Most wins by an owner:

- 5 – Glen Riddle Farm (1919, 1920, 1925, 1926, 1938)
- 5 – Bohemia Stable (1960, 1961, 1962, 1963, 1964)

Most wins by a jockey:

- 11 – Eddie Arcaro (1935, 1946, 1948, 1949, 1950, 1954, 1955, 1956, 1959, 1960, 1961)

Most wins by a trainer:

- 6 – Jim Fitzsimmons (1929, 1930, 1933, 1934, 1955, 1956)

== Winners ==
Year	Winner	Age	Jockey	Trainer	Owner	Dist. (Miles)	Time	Win$	Gr.
2026	Forever Young	5	Ryusei Sakai	Yoshito Yahagi	Susumu Fujita	11/4 m	2:01.23	$630,000	G1
2025	Antiquarian	4	John R. Velazquez	Todd Pletcher	Centennial Farms	11/4 m	2:02.16	$550,000	G1
2024	Highland Falls	4	Flavien Prat	Brad H. Cox	Godolphin	11/4 m	2:03.00	$550,000	G1
2023	Bright Future	4	Javier Castellano	Todd A. Pletcher	Repole Stable & St. Elias Stable	11/4 m	2:03.25	$600,000	G1
2022	Olympiad	4	Junior Alvarado	William I. Mott	Grandview Equine, Cheyenne Stables & LNJ Foxwoods	11/4 m	2:02.11	$600,000	G1
2021	Max Player	4	Ricardo Santana Jr.	Steve Asmussen	George E. Hall & SportBLX Thoroughbreds Crop.	11/4 m	2:02.49	$600,000	G1
2020	Happy Saver	3	Irad Ortiz Jr.	Todd A. Pletcher	Wertheimer et Frere	11/4 m	2:01.77	$250,000	G1
2019	Code of Honor^{1}	3	John Velazquez	Shug McGaughey	William S. Farish III	11/4 m	2:00.30	$433,125	G1
2018	Discreet Lover	5	Manuel Franco	Uriah St. Lewis	Uriah St. Lewis	11/4 m	1:59.99	$433,125	G1
2017	Diversify	4	Irad Ortiz Jr.	Richard Violette Jr.	Lauren & Ralph Evans	11/4 m	2:00.96	$450,000	G1
2016	Hoppertunity	5	John Velazquez	Bob Baffert	Karl Watson, Mile Pegram, Paul Weitman	11/4 m	2:00.68	$600,000	G1
2015	Tonalist	4	John Velazquez	Christophe Clement	Robert S. Evans	11/4 m	2:02.16	$600,000	G1
2014	Tonalist	3	Joel Rosario	Christophe Clement	Robert S. Evans	11/4 m	2:02.12	$600,000	G1
2013	Ron the Greek	6	Jose Lezcano	William I. Mott	Brous Stable/Wachtel Stable et al.	11/4 m	1:59.70	$600,000	G1
2012	Flat Out	6	Joel Rosario	William I. Mott	Preston Stables LLC (Art Preston)	11/4 m	2:01.44	$600,000	G1
2011	Flat Out	5	Alex Solis	Scooter Dickey	Preston Stables LLC (Art Preston)	11/4 m	2:03.17	$450,000	G1
2010	Haynesfield	4	Ramon Domínguez	Steve Asmussen	Turtle Bird Stable (Harvey & Bernice Weinstein)	11/4 m	2:02.48	$450,000	G1
2009	Summer Bird	3	Kent J. Desormeaux	Tim A. Ice	Kalarikkal K. & Vilasini D. Jayaraman	11/4 m	2:02.51	$450,000	G1
2008	Curlin	4	Robby Albarado	Steve Asmussen	Stonestreet Stables et al.	11/4 m	2:01:93	$450,000	G1
2007	Curlin	3	Robby Albarado	Steve Asmussen	Stonestreet Stables et al.	11/4 m	2:01.20	$450,000	G1
2006	Bernardini	3	Javier Castellano	Thomas Albertrani	Darley Stable	11/4 m	2:01.02	$450,000	G1
2005	Borrego	4	Garrett Gomez	C. Beau Greely	Jon S. Kelly, Ralls & Foster LLC, Brad Scott, et al.	11/4 m	2:02.86	$600,000	G1
2004	Funny Cide	4	José A. Santos	Barclay Tagg	Sackatoga Stable (Tony Everard)	11/4 m	2:02.44	$600,000	G1
2003	Mineshaft	4	Robby Albarado	Neil J. Howard	Farish, Elkins, Webber	11/4 m	2:00.25	$600,000	G1
2002	Evening Attire	4	Shaun Bridgmohan	Patrick J. Kelly	Joseph & Mary Grant, Thomas J. Kelly	11/4 m	1:59.58	$600,000	G1
2001	Aptitude	4	Jerry Bailey	Robert J. Frankel	Juddmonte Farm	11/4 m	2:01.49	$600,000	G1
2000	Albert the Great	3	Jorge Chavez	Nick Zito	Tracy Farmer	11/4 m	1:59.24	$600,000	G1
1999	River Keen	7	Chris Antley	Bob Baffert	Hugo Reynolds	11/4 m	2:01.40	$600,000	G1
1998	Wagon Limit	4	Robbie Davis	H. Allen Jerkens	Joseph V. Shields Jr.	11/4 m	2:00.62	$600,000	G1
1997	Skip Away	4	Jerry Bailey	Hubert Hine	Carolyn Hine	11/4 m	1:58.89	$600,000	G1
1996	Skip Away	3	Shane Sellers	Hubert Hine	Carolyn Hine	11/4 m	2:00.70	$600,000	G1
1995	Cigar	5	Jerry Bailey	William I. Mott	Allen Paulson	11/4 m	2:01.29	$450,000	G1
1994	Colonial Affair	4	José A. Santos	Flint S. Schulhofer	Centennial Farms (Don Little Sr. racing partnership)	11/4 m	2:02.19	$450,000	G1
1993	Miner's Mark	3	Chris McCarron	C. R. McGaughey III	Ogden Phipps	11/4 m	2:02.79	$510,000	G1
1992	Pleasant Tap	5	Gary Stevens	Christopher Speckert	Buckland Farm	11/4 m	1:58.95	$510,000	G1
1991	Festin	5	Ed Delahoussaye	Ron McAnally	Kinerk Burton	11/4 m	2:00.69	$510,000	G1
1990	Flying Continental	4	Corey Black	Jay M. Robbins	Jack Kent Cooke	11/4 m	2:00.60	$503,100	G1
1989	Easy Goer	3	Pat Day	C. R. McGaughey III	Ogden Phipps	11/2 m	2:29.20	$659,400	G1
1988	Waquoit	5	José A. Santos	Guido Federico	Joseph Federico	11/2 m	2:27.60	$637,800	G1
1987	Creme Fraiche	5	Laffit Pincay Jr.	Woody Stephens	Brushwood Stable	11/2 m	2:30.80	$650,400	G1
1986	Creme Fraiche	4	Randy Romero	Woody Stephens	Brushwood Stable	11/2 m	2:28.00	$510,300	G1
1985	Vanlandingham	4	Pat Day	C. R. McGaughey III	Loblolly Stable	11/2 m	2:27.00	$516,600	G1
1984	Slew o' Gold	4	Ángel Cordero Jr.	John O. Hertler	Equusequitey Stable (Jim & Sally Hill / Mickey & Karen Taylor)	11/2 m	2:28.80	$1,350,400	G1
1983	Slew o' Gold	3	Ángel Cordero Jr.	Sidney Watters Jr.	Equusequitey Stable (Jim & Sally Hill / Mickey & Karen Taylor)	11/2 m	2:26.20	$342,000	G1
1982	Lemhi Gold	4	Chris McCarron	Laz Barrera	Aaron U. Jones	11/2 m	2:31.20	$337,800	G1
1981	John Henry	6	Bill Shoemaker	Victor J. Nickerson	Dotsam Stable	11/2 m	2:28.40	$340,800	G1
1980	Temperence Hill	3	Eddie Maple	Joseph B. Cantey	Loblolly Stable	11/2 m	2:30.20	$329,400	G1
1979	Affirmed	4	Laffit Pincay Jr.	Laz Barrera	Harbor View Farm	11/2 m	2:27.40	$225,000	G1
1978	Exceller	5	Bill Shoemaker	Charles Whittingham	Nelson Bunker Hunt	11/2 m	2:27.20	$193,080	G1
1977	On The Sly	4	Gregg McCarron	Mel W. Gross	Balmak Stable (Mary Streit)	11/2 m	2:28.20	$208,080	G1
1976	Great Contractor	3	Pat Day	Roger Laurin	Howard P. Wilson	11/2 m	2:28.80	$201,360	G1
1975	Group Plan	5	Jorge Velásquez	H. Allen Jerkens	Hobeau Farm	2 m	3:23.20	$95,850	G1
1974	Forego	4	Heliodoro Gustines	Sherrill W. Ward	Lazy F Ranch	2 m	3:21.20	$67,140	G1
1973	Prove Out	4	Jorge Velásquez	H. Allen Jerkens	Hobeau Farm	2 m	3:20.00	$66,060	G1
1972	Autobiography	4	Ángel Cordero Jr.	Pancho Martin	Sigmund Sommer	2 m	3:21.40	$68,220	
1971	Shuvee	5	Jorge Velásquez	Willard C. Freeman	Anne Minor Stone	2 m	3:20.40	$66,900	
1970	Shuvee	4	Ron Turcotte	Willard C. Freeman	Anne Minor Stone	2 m	3:21.60	$70,785	
1969	Arts and Letters	3	Braulio Baeza	J. Elliott Burch	Rokeby Stables	2 m	3:22.40	$69,030	
1968	Quicken Tree	5	William Hartack	Clyde Turk	Louis R. Rowan & Wheelock Whitney Jr.	2 m	3:22.80	$71,370	
1967	Damascus	3	Bill Shoemaker	Frank Y. Whiteley Jr.	Edith W. Bancroft	2 m	3:20.20	$69,290	
1966	Buckpasser	3	Braulio Baeza	Edward A. Neloy	Ogden Phipps	2 m	3:26.20	$71,825	
1965	Roman Brother	4	Braulio Baeza	Burley Parke	Harbor View Farm	2 m	3:22.60	$71,500	
1964	Kelso	7	Ismael Valenzuela	Carl Hanford	Bohemia Stable	2 m	3:19.20	$70,785	
1963	Kelso	6	Ismael Valenzuela	Carl Hanford	Bohemia Stable	2 m	3:22.00	$70,785	
1962	Kelso	5	Ismael Valenzuela	Carl Hanford	Bohemia Stable	2 m	3:19.80	$70,785	
1961	Kelso	4	Eddie Arcaro	Carl Hanford	Bohemia Stable	2 m	3:25.80	$68,770	
1960	Kelso	3	Eddie Arcaro	Carl Hanford	Bohemia Stable	2 m	3:19.40	$70,205	
1959	Sword Dancer	3	Eddie Arcaro	J. Elliott Burch	Brookmeade Stable	2 m	3:22.20	$70,790	
1958	Inside Tract	4	Conn McCreary	John J. Weipert Jr.	D & M Stable (Raymond da Brino & Joseph Martino)	2 m	3:23.40	$52,417	
1957	Gallant Man	3	Bill Shoemaker	John A. Nerud	Ralph Lowe	2 m	3:23.00	$53,850	
1956	Nashua	4	Eddie Arcaro	Jim Fitzsimmons	Leslie Combs II	2 m	3:20.40	$36,600	
1955	Nashua	3	Eddie Arcaro	Jim Fitzsimmons	Belair Stud	2 m	3:24.80	$52,850	
1954	High Gun	3	Eddie Arcaro	Max Hirsch	King Ranch	2 m	3:25.80	$55,150	
1953	Level Lea	3	William Boland	Max Hirsch	John Shaffer Phipps	2 m	3:27.00	$55,100	
1952	One Count	3	Dave Gorman	Oscar White	Mrs. Walter M. Jeffords	2 m	3:24.20	$52,100	
1951	Counterpoint	3	Dave Gorman	Sylvester Veitch	C. V. Whitney	2 m	3:21.60	$35,600	
1950	Hill Prince	3	Eddie Arcaro	Casey Hayes	Christopher Chenery	2 m	3:22.40	$36,006	
1949	Ponder	3	Eddie Arcaro	Ben A. Jones	Calumet Farm	2 m	3:22.80	$36,300	
1948	Citation	3	Eddie Arcaro	Ben A. Jones	Calumet Farm	2 m	3:21.60	$72,700	
1947	Phalanx	3	Ruperto Donoso	Sylvester Veitch	C. V. Whitney	2 m	3:21.60	$17,850	
1946	Pavot	4	Eddie Arcaro	Oscar White	Walter M. Jeffords Sr.	2 m	3:22.60	$18,250	
1945	Pot o'Luck	3	Douglas Dodson	Ben A. Jones	Calumet Farm	2 m	3:27.40	$18,335	
1944	Bolingbroke	7	Robert Permane	Walter Burrows	Townsend B. Martin	2 m	3:27.20	$17,645	
1943	Princequillo	3	Conn McCreary	Horatio Luro	Boone Hall Stable	2 m	3:23.80	$18,350	
1942	Whirlaway	4	George Woolf	Ben A. Jones	Calumet Farm	2 m	3:21.60	$18,350	
1941	Market Wise	3	Basil James	George W. Carroll	Louis Tufano	2 m	3:20.80	$7,325	
1940	Fenelon	3	James Stout	James E. Fitzsimmons	Belair Stud	2 m	3:24.40	$6,700	
1939	Cravat	4	Basil James	Walter Burrows	Townsend B. Martin	2 m	3:23.00	$5,550	
1938	War Admiral	4	Wayne D. Wright	George Conway	Glen Riddle Farm	2 m	3:24.80	$5,500	
1937	Firethorn	5	Harry Richards	Preston M. Burch	Walter M. Jeffords Sr.	2 m	3:26.00	$6,050	
1936	Count Arthur	4	James Stout	Lon Johnson	Fannie Hertz	2 m	3:24.40	$6,750	
1935	Firethorn	3	Eddie Arcaro	Preston M. Burch	Walter M. Jeffords Sr.	2 m	3:24.20	$6,550	
1934	Dark Secret	5	Charles Kurtsinger	Jim Fitzsimmons	Wheatley Stable	2 m	3:24.60	$6,200	
1933	Dark Secret	4	Hank Mills	Jim Fitzsimmons	Wheatley Stable	2 m	3:25.20	$6,400	
1932	Gusto	3	Buddy Hanford	Max Hirsch	Morton L. Schwartz	2 m	3:25.20	$9,950	
1931	Twenty Grand	3	Charles Kurtsinger	James G. Rowe Jr.	Greentree Stable	2 m	3:23.40	$10,400	
1930	Gallant Fox	3	Earl Sande	Jim Fitzsimmons	Belair Stud	2 m	3:24.40	$10,300	
1929	Diavolo	4	John Maiben	Jim Fitzsimmons	Wheatley Stable	2 m	3:24.00	$10,900	
1928	Reigh Count	3	Chick Lang	Bert S. Michell	Fannie Hertz	2 m	3:23.00	$10,850	
1927	Chance Play^{2}	4	Earl Sande	John I. Smith	Log Cabin Stable	2 m	3:23.00	$12,000	
1926	Crusader	3	Albert Johnson	George Conway	Glen Riddle Farm	2 m	3:26.00	$13,300	
1925	Altawood	4	John Maiben	G. Hamilton Keene	Joseph E. Widener	2 m	3:26.00	$13,050	
1924	My Play	5	Andy Schuttinger	Roy Waldron	Lexington Stable (Edward F. Simms & Henry W. Oliver)	2 m	3:25.60	$14,150	
1923	Homestretch	3	Chick Lang	Ernest Sletas	Herman Alterman	2 m	3:24.20	$11,300	
1922	Mad Hatter	6	Earl Sande	Sam Hildreth	Rancocas Stable	2 m	3:22.60	$12,700	
1921	Mad Hatter	5	Earl Sande	Sam Hildreth	Rancocas Stable	2 m	3:22.40	$12,100	
1920	Man o' War^{3}	3	Clarence Kummer	Louis Feustel	Glen Riddle Farm	11/2 m	2:28.80	$5,850	
1919	Purchase	3	Clarence Kummer	Sam Hildreth	Glen Riddle Farm	11/2 m	2:28.80	$5,350	

^{1}In 2019, Vino Rosso finished first but was disqualified and placed second.

^{2}In 1927, Brown Bud finished first but was disqualified.

^{3}Only two horses started in 1920.
