= George H. Conway =

Personal information
- Born: July 7, 1873
- Died: June 20, 1939 (aged 65) Oceanport, New Jersey, USA
- Occupation: Trainer

Horse racing career
- Sport: Horse racing

Major racing wins
- Black-Eyed Susan Stakes (1925, 1937); Manor Handicap (1925); Cincinnati Derby (1926); Dwyer Stakes (1926, 1933); Havre de Grace Handicap (1926); Huron Handicap (1926, 1932); Jockey Club Gold Cup (1926, 1938); Riggs Memorial Handicap (1926); Suburban Handicap (1926, 1927); Saratoga Cup (1932, 1938); Travers Stakes (1932); Test Stakes (1933); Great American Stakes (1936); Chesapeake Stakes (1937); Pimlico Special (1937); Washington Handicap (1937); Saratoga Handicap (1938); Whitney Handicap (1938); Wilson Stakes (1938); Jockey Club Gold Cup (1938); Queens County Handicap (1938); Rhode Island Handicap (1938); Widener Handicap (1938); Massachusetts Handicap (1941); Narragansett Special (1941) Triple Crown race wins: Kentucky Derby (1937); Preakness Stakes (1937); Belmont Stakes (1926, 1937)

Significant horses
- American Flag, Crusader, Maid at Arms, War Admiral, War Relic
- Updated on 2018-08-17

George H. Conway (July 7, 1873 – June 20, 1939) was a Triple Crown-winning American horse trainer who worked at Glen Riddle Farm in Berlin, Maryland. He is best known for training War Admiral, who won the Triple Crown in 1937 and was selected as the American Horse of the Year over his nephew and competitor Seabiscuit. Other notable horses trained by Conway include American Flag, who won the Belmont Stakes in 1925 before training with Conway, Crusader, who won the 1926 Belmont Stakes with Conway, Maid at Arms, who was the 1925 American Champion Three-Year-Old Filly, and War Relic, who was the last horse that Conway trained.

Conway retired to Oceanport, New Jersey, in June 1939, where he died on June 20, 1939.
