= Crusader (horse) =

American-bred Thoroughbred racehorse

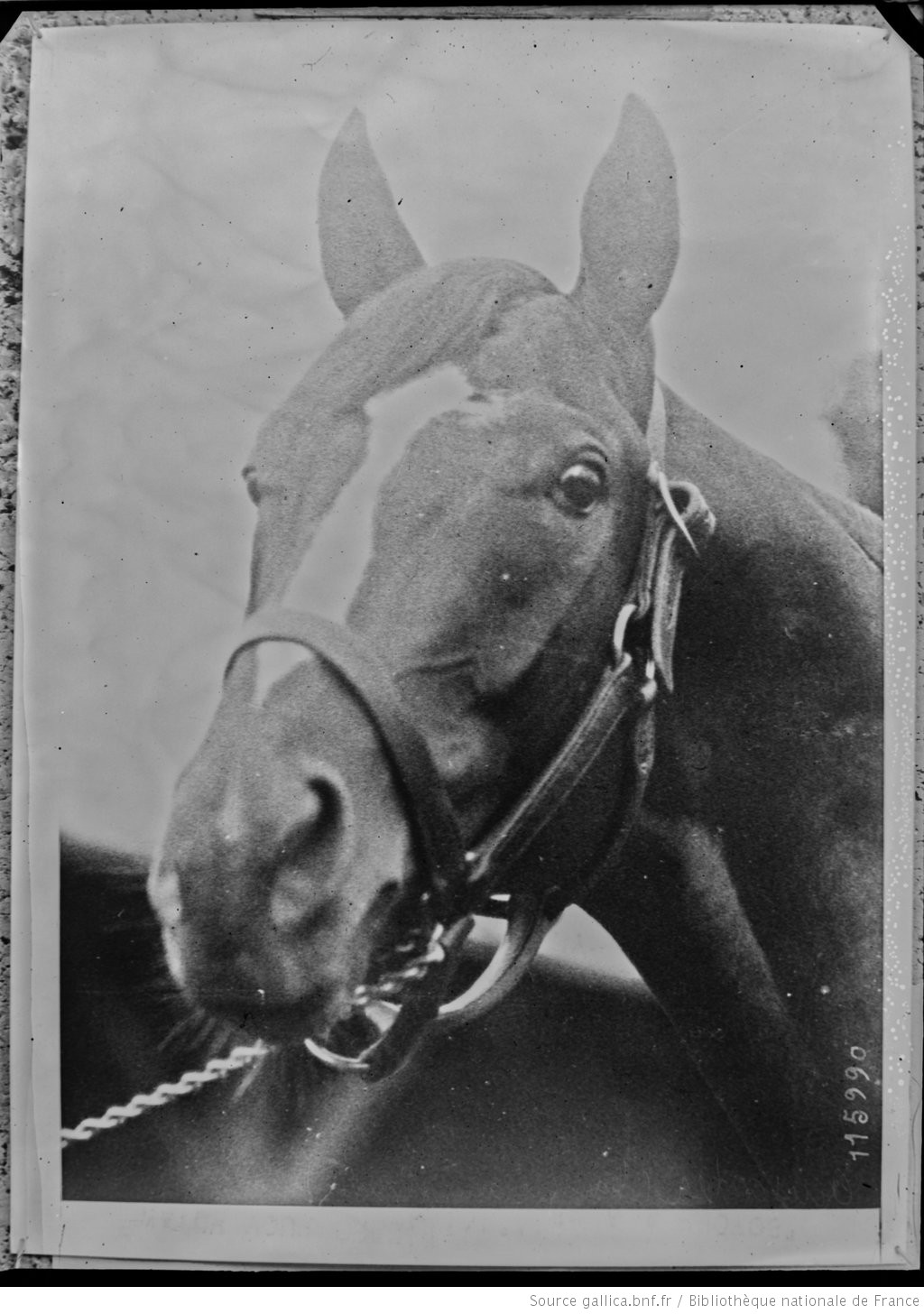
- Crusader in January 1927
- Sire: Man o' War
- Grandsire: Fair Play
- Dam: Star Fancy
- Damsire: Star Shoot
- Sex: Stallion
- Foaled: 1923
- Country: United States
- Colour: Chestnut
- Breeder: Samuel D. Riddle
- Owner: Glen Riddle Farm
- Trainer: Gwyn R. Tompkins (at 2); George H. Conway (at 3)
- Record: 42: 18-8-4
- Earnings: $203,261

Major wins
- Manor Handicap (1925); Dwyer Stakes (1926); Riggs Handicap (1926); Havre de Grace Handicap (1926); Jockey Club Gold Cup (1926); Suburban Handicap (1926, 1927) American Classic Race wins: Belmont Stakes (1926)

Awards
- U.S. Champion 3-Yr-Old Colt (1926); United States Horse of the Year (1926)

Honours
- United States Racing Hall of Fame (1995)
- Last updated on September 22, 2006

Crusader (1923–1940) was an American Thoroughbred racehorse, whose career lasted from 1925 to 1928. In that time, he ran forty-two times and won eighteen races. He was the leading American three-year-old in 1926, winning a number of important races including the Suburban Handicap, the Belmont Stakes and the Dwyer Stakes. He continued to race for a further two seasons, but his form declined after he was injured at Aqueduct Racetrack in June 1927.

== Background ==
Crusader was sired by Man o' War from the mare Star Fancy, from the same family which also produced leading performers such as Whisk Broom, Venetian Way, Timber Country and Dubai Millennium. As a son of Man o' War, Crusader was a representative of the Godolphin Arabian sire line, unlike the majority of modern thoroughbreds, who descend from the Darley Arabian. He was bred by Samuel D. Riddle and was raced by his Glen Riddle Farm. He was usually ridden by either Earl Sande or Albert Johnson.

== Racing career ==
=== 1925: two-year-old season ===
As a two-year-old in 1925, Crusader won the Potomac Purse at Belmont Park, but his most important win of the year came in the $10,000 Manor Handicap at Laurel Park Racecourse on October 24.

=== 1926: three-year-old season ===
In 1926, Crusader defeated older horses including his stable companion American Flag to win the Suburban Handicap. He won the Belmont Stakes against his own age group a week later, beating Espino by a length in front of a crowd of 25,000. On July 3 at Aqueduct, he won the Dwyer Stakes by a nose from Chance Play, setting a course record of 2:29.6 for the mile and a half. In the $30,000 Cincinnati Derby on July 25, Crusader set another track record of 2:02.0 for ten furlongs, beating the Preakness Stakes winner Display with "remarkable ease" by three lengths.

On September 26 at Havre de Grace Racetrack, Crusader won the Havre de Grace Handicap by ten lengths from Son of John, Display and Sarazen equaling the nine furlong track record of 1:50.0. According to The New York Times, the win was "wildly acclaimed" and established Crusader as the Horse of the Year. Crusader finished fourth to Croyden when favourite for the Laurel Stakes but returned to win the inaugural running of the Riggs Handicap at Pimlico Race Course on November 1. On his final start of the season he finished second when attempting to concede thirty-three pounds in weight to the filly Edith Cavell in the two and a quarter mile Pimlico Cup. After this race it was reported that Crusader would be retired to a stud career in Europe.

Although there were no formal awards in 1926, Crusader was recognised as the Champion 3-year-old Male Horse and the Horse of the Year. His earnings of $166,033 made him the season's leading money-winner.

=== 1927: four-year-old season ===
In 1927, Crusader's early runs were disappointing, but he returned to form to become the first horse to win successive runnings of the Suburban Handicap, beating Black Maria by eight lengths on June 4. In his next race, the Brooklyn Handicap, he sustained career-threatening injuries when he was kicked in the leg by another horse. Although he returned to racing after a break, he was unable to recapture his best form.

=== 1928: five-year-old season ===
Crusader's five-year-old campaign was a disappointment as he failed to win in seven starts.

== Stud record ==
Crusader began his stud career at Colonel Phil T. Chinn's Himyar Stud in 1929, but returned to Riddle's own Faraway Farm stud to stand at a fee of $1,500 when Chinn was declared bankrupt a year later. He was not a great success as a stallion, attracting a disappointingly small number of mares and siring only six stakes winners. He did get Crossbow II (Sanford Stakes) and Royal Crusader (Del Mar Handicap). In 1938 Riddle leased Crusader to the Rancho Casitas, at Ventura, California, where he died in 1940.

== Honors ==
Crusader was inducted into the National Museum of Racing and Hall of Fame in 1995.

== Pedigree ==
Pedigree of Crusader (USA), chestnut stallion, 1923
Sire Man o' War (USA) 1917	Fair Play; 1905	Hastings	Spendthrift
Sire Man o' War (USA) 1917	Fair Play; 1905	Hastings	Cinderella*
Sire Man o' War (USA) 1917	Fair Play; 1905	Fairy Gold	Bend Or
Sire Man o' War (USA) 1917	Fair Play; 1905	Fairy Gold	Dame Masham
Sire Man o' War (USA) 1917	Mahubah; 1910	Rock Sand	Sainfoin
Sire Man o' War (USA) 1917	Mahubah; 1910	Rock Sand	Roquebrune
Sire Man o' War (USA) 1917	Mahubah; 1910	Merry Token	Merry Hampton
Sire Man o' War (USA) 1917	Mahubah; 1910	Merry Token	Mizpah
Dam Star Fancy (USA) 1916	Star Shoot; 1898	Isinglass	Isonomy
Dam Star Fancy (USA) 1916	Star Shoot; 1898	Isinglass	Dead Lock
Dam Star Fancy (USA) 1916	Star Shoot; 1898	Astrology	Hermit
Dam Star Fancy (USA) 1916	Star Shoot; 1898	Astrology	Stella
Dam Star Fancy (USA) 1916	Dolly Higgins; 1907	Migraine	Top Gallant
Dam Star Fancy (USA) 1916	Dolly Higgins; 1907	Migraine	Cinderella*
Dam Star Fancy (USA) 1916	Dolly Higgins; 1907	Frances McClelland	Bermuda
Dam Star Fancy (USA) 1916	Dolly Higgins; 1907	Frances McClelland	Sallie McClelland(Family:4-m)

* Crusader is inbred 4S × 4D to the mare Cinderella, meaning that she appears fourth generation on the sire side of his pedigree and fourth generation on the dam side of his pedigree.
