= Maid at Arms =

American-bred Thoroughbred racehorse

Maid At Arms
- Sire: Man o' War
- Grandsire: Fair Play
- Dam: Trasher
- Damsire: Trap Rock
- Sex: Filly
- Foaled: 1922
- Country: United States
- Colour: Chestnut
- Breeder: Samuel Riddle
- Owner: Samuel Riddle
- Trainer: George Conway
- Record: 17: 7-1-4
- Earnings: US$$29,305

Major wins
- Pimlico Oaks (1925); Alabama Stakes (1925); Maryland Handicap (1925)

Awards
- American Champion Three-Year-Old Filly (1925)

Maid At Arms (foaled 1922 in Kentucky) was an American Champion Thoroughbred racehorse. Her sire was Man o' War, a son of three-time Leading sire in North America Fair Play. Her dam was Trasher, a daughter of Trap Rock. Maid At Arms is probably best remembered for her victory in the seventh running of the Black-Eyed Susan Stakes on May 4, 1925.

== Racing career ==
Maid At Arms had a very brief racing career (racing 17 times in twelve months) but was retrospectively named as American Champion Three-Year-Old Filly for 1925 by The Blood-Horse. She broke her maiden at the end of 1924 and in early February, early March and late March 1925 she won three separate allowance races. In May, owner Samuel Riddle and trainer George Conway decided to run Maid At Arms in the de facto second jewel of the filly Triple Crown, the Black-Eyed Susan Stakes (it was called the Pimlico Oaks at the time). Maid at Arms captured the seventh running of the $7,500 Black-Eyed Susan Stakes, beating the seven other three year-old fillies over the course of a mile and a sixteenth. Under 113 pounds and with jockey Albert Johnson in the saddle, she ran the distance in 1:46 flat over a fast track, winning by four lengths. Stakes-winning fillies Revoke and Primrose finished second and third.

In July 1925, Maid At Arms raced in open company against males in the Maryland Handicap at Laurel Park Racecourse and won the mile and one sixteenth race. Late in August 1925, she shipped to Saratoga Race Course and won the historic Alabama Stakes. In September, she took on males again and placed second in the Jerome Handicap against one of the fillies she beat in the Black-Eyed Susan Stakes, Primrose.
