= War Admiral =

American-bred Thoroughbred racehorse

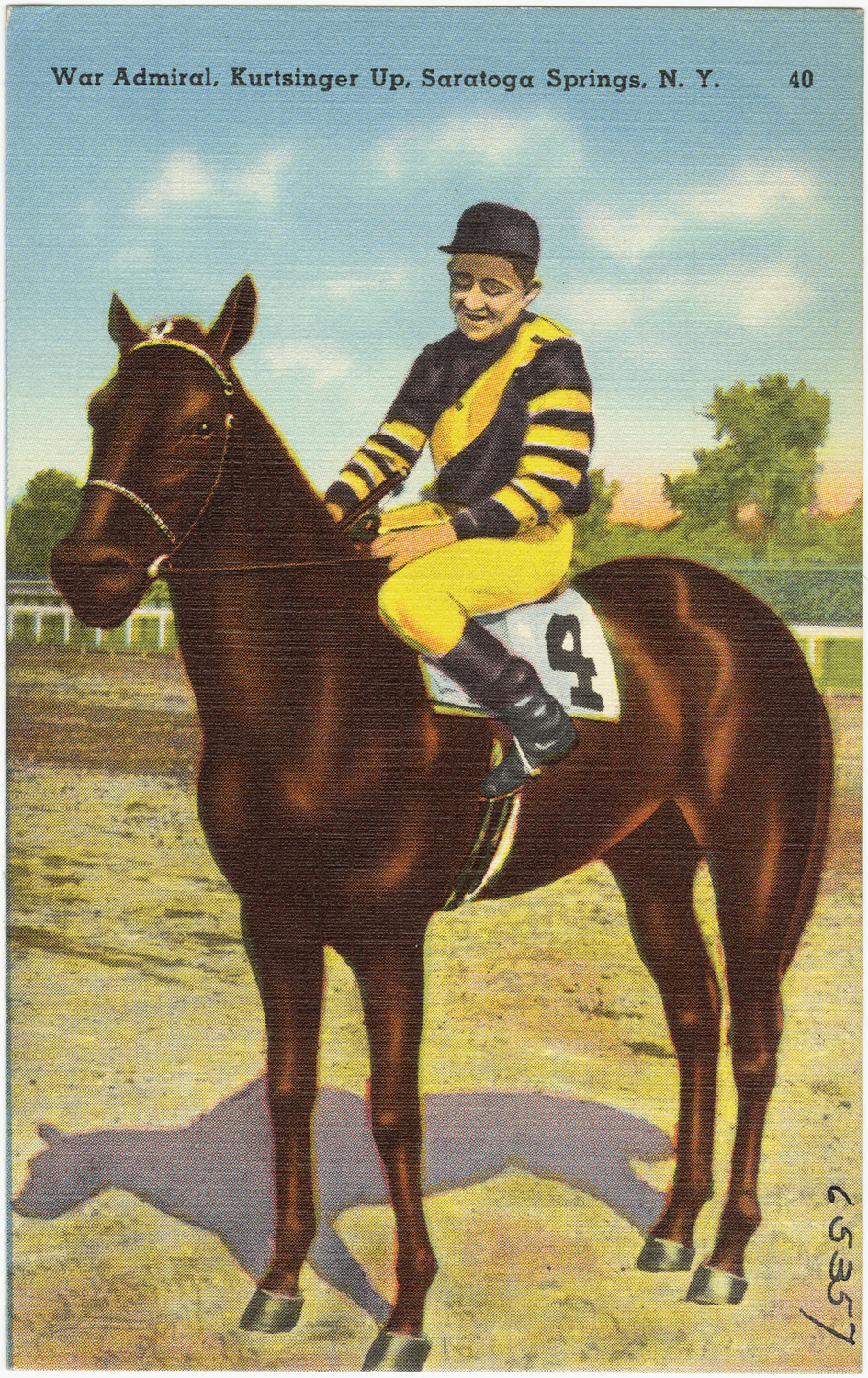
- War Admiral at Saratoga, July 1938
- Sire: Man o' War
- Grandsire: Fair Play
- Dam: Brushup
- Damsire: Sweep
- Sex: Stallion
- Foaled: May 2, 1934
- Died: October 30, 1959 (aged 25)
- Country: United States
- Color: Brown
- Breeder: Samuel D. Riddle
- Owner: Glen Riddle Farm; Silks: Black, Yellow Sash, Yellow Bars on Sleeves, Black Cap
- Trainer: George Conway
- Record: 26: 21-3-1
- Earnings: $273,240

Major wins
- Eastern Shore Handicap (1936); Washington Handicap (1937); Pimlico Special (1937); Saratoga Cup (1938); Whitney Handicap (1938); Wilson Stakes (1938); Jockey Club Gold Cup (1938); Queens County Handicap (1938) Triple Crown race wins: Kentucky Derby (1937); Preakness Stakes (1937); Belmont Stakes (1937)

Awards
- 4th U.S. Triple Crown Champion (1937); U.S. Champion 3-Yr-Old Colt (1937); United States Horse of the Year (1937); Leading sire in North America (1945); Leading broodmare sire in North America (1962, 1964)

Honours
- United States Racing Hall of Fame (1958) #13 - Top 100 U.S. Racehorses of the 20th Century

War Admiral (May 2, 1934 – October 30, 1959) was a champion American Thoroughbred racehorse and the fourth winner of the American Triple Crown. He was also the 1937 Horse of the Year and well known as the rival of Seabiscuit in the "Match Race of the Century" in 1938. War Admiral won 21 of his 26 starts with earnings of $273,240 and was the leading sire in North America for 1945. He was also an outstanding broodmare sire whose influence is still felt today in descendants such as Triple Crown winners American Pharoah and Justify.

== Background ==
War Admiral raced as a homebred for Samuel D. Riddle, who also owned Man o' War. War Admiral was foaled at Faraway Farm in Lexington, the offspring of Man o' War and Brushup. Man o' War was widely regarded as the greatest American racehorse of his time, but Brushup never won a race. They were bred together six times, producing five undistinguished fillies and one Triple Crown winner.

War Admiral inherited his father's talent, but did not resemble him physically. At 15.2 hands (62 inches, 157 cm), or 15.3 he was smaller than Man o' War's height of 16.3 hands. War Admiral's dark brown coat was inherited from his dam, who also contributed to War Admiral's smaller size as she was under 15 hands. Because of his size, one of War Admiral's nicknames was The Mighty Atom. Others referred to him simply as The Admiral.

Most sources say that War Admiral inherited his sire's fiery temperament, which manifested chiefly in his reluctance to load in the starting gate. Away from the crowds though, he was more relaxed and given to taking long naps. His groom called him sweet, and his trainer, George Conway, found him more like his dam in terms of personality. Conway was in a position to know as he had been stable foreman to Louis Feustel while the latter trained Man o' War. Conway stayed with Riddle after Feustel's retirement, and trained several of Man o' War's most successful offspring. War Admiral's regular jockey was Charles Kurtsinger.

== Racing career ==
=== 1936: Two-year-old season ===
As a two-year-old in 1936, War Admiral won three of six races including the Eastern Shore Handicap. However, the star of this crop was then considered to be Pompoon, who defeated War Admiral in the National Stallion Stakes. War Admiral was rated at 121 pounds on the Experimental Free Handicap, seven pounds below two-year-old champion Pompoon and seventh overall.

=== 1937: Three-year-old season ===
In 1937, War Admiral started his three-year-old campaign by winning two races at Havre de Grace, including the Chesapeake Stakes. Riddle then made a fateful decision. In 1920, Man o' War was not entered in the Kentucky Derby as Riddle did not like racing outside of New York and Maryland, and also felt the distance of the Derby was too great for three-year-olds so early in the season. For War Admiral, Riddle made an exception and made the trip west to Churchill Downs in Louisville. War Admiral went off as the favorite, and, despite delaying the start for several minutes, won in wire-to-wire fashion with Pompoon 1 3/4 lengths back in second. Neville Dunn, sports editor for the Lexington Herald, wrote, "A little brown horse that takes after his mammy in size but runs like his daddy charged to victory in the 63rd Kentucky Derby… and he won so easily, so effortlessly, that 65,000 fans nudged one another in the ribs and said, 'I told you so! I told you that War Admiral could run like Man o' War.'"

The Preakness Stakes was held just a week later. After again acting up at the start, War Admiral went to the lead early but had trouble negotiating the turns. Pompoon saved ground along the rail and closed alongside War Admiral as they exited the last turn. The two horses dueled down the stretch with War Admiral finally prevailing by a head.

On June 5, War Admiral faced six rivals in the Belmont Stakes, going off as the 4-5 favorite. He was particularly fractious at the start, repeatedly breaking through the barrier. After delaying the start for eight minutes, he stumbled leaving the gate. He quickly recovered his stride and won the race by three lengths with "speed to spare". His time of 2:28 3/5 tied the American Record for 1 1/2 miles, while breaking Man o' War's track record by a fifth of a second. War Admiral thus became the fourth winner of the American Triple Crown. But the victory came at a price: War Admiral had struck the quarter of his right front fore-foot when stumbling at the gate, which left a gaping wound. During the race, his jockey did not notice that anything was amiss. But when led into the winner's circle, his connections found that his belly and legs were covered with blood.

The injury was severe enough to cause War Admiral to miss the summer racing season. He returned in October to win three more races, including the Washington Handicap and the inaugural Pimlico Special. All told, in 1937 War Admiral won eight of eight races including the Triple Crown. He was the unanimous selection as Champion 3-Year-Old, and also earned the title of Horse of the Year in a close battle with Seabiscuit, the Champion older horse.

=== 1938: Four-year-old season ===
In 1938, War Admiral won eight major races, including the Whitney Handicap and Jockey Club Gold Cup. He is linked forever with the year-older Seabiscuit, who was a grandson of Man o' War and the preeminent horse based in the western U.S. Seabiscuit's owner, Charles Howard, brought his horse across country to give Seabiscuit the chance to prove himself to the eastern racing establishment. Seabiscuit and War Admiral almost faced each other several times that summer but for one reason or another, they never met. Finally, a meeting was arranged for November 1, 1938, in the Pimlico Special in what was billed as The Match Race of the Century. Samuel Riddle asked that the race be run without a starting gate in light of War Admiral's problematic history. With War Admiral's early speed, he was widely seen to have a tactical advantage in a match race and went off as the favorite. However, Seabiscuit's trainer had secretly conditioned his horse to bolt at the sound of a starting bell, which resulted in Seabiscuit getting the all-important early lead. Seabiscuit won by four lengths and broke the track record.

War Admiral raced twice more, winning the Rhode Island Handicap in 1938 and a race at Hialeah in February 1939 before an injury prompted his retirement.

== Stud career ==
War Admiral stood at Faraway Farm until 1958, when the executors of Riddle's estate sold the remaining portion of the farm. War Admiral was then moved to Hamburg Place, where he died in 1959.

War Admiral was the leading American sire in 1945 and the leading juvenile sire in 1948. Before his 1959 death, War Admiral sired 40 stakes winners. Major winners sired by War Admiral include champion Blue Peter, Bee Mac, Navy Page, Cold Command, and Admiral Vee. As a sire, War Admiral is perhaps best known for his success with daughters of La Troienne. This cross produced the champion filly and Horse of the Year Busher (ranked #40 in Blood-Horse magazine List of the Top 100 U.S. Racehorses of the 20th Century), as well as stakes winners Searching, Busanda and Mr. Busher.

Although War Admiral's sire line no longer exists, he remains a significant influence in modern pedigrees due to his daughters. He was the Leading broodmare sire of 1962 and 1964. Descendants in the female line include the likes of Swaps, Buckpasser, and Numbered Account, as well as two Triple Crown winners, Seattle Slew and Affirmed. Other descendants of note include Dr. Fager, Alysheba, Cigar and Zenyatta. War Admiral's name appears eight times in the pedigree of the 2015 Triple Crown winner, American Pharoah.

== Race record ==
Lifetime record: 26-21-3-1 Earnings: $273,240
Date	Track	Race	Distance	Odds	Field	Finish	Margin	Notes
4-25-1936	Havre de Grace	Maiden Special Weight	4 1/2 furlongs	7.50	10	1	nose	
5-21-1936	Belmont Park	Allowance	5 furlongs	10.00	8	1	2 lengths	Widener Chute
6-6-1936	Belmont Park	National Stallion Stakes	5 furlongs	3.00	10	3	(2 1/2 lengths)	Widener Chute, lost to Pompoon
7-1-1936	Aqueduct	Great American Stakes	6 furlongs	2.00	8	2	(1 1/2 lengths)	
9-19-1936	Havre de Grace	Eastern Shore Handicap	6 furlongs	7.85	15	1	5 lengths	
10-10-1936	Laurel Park	Richard Johnson Handicap	6 furlongs	*0.80	10	2	(1 1/2 lengths)	Track: Muddy
4-14-1937	Havre de Grace	Allowance	6 furlongs	*0.75	6	1	2 1/2 lengths	
4-24-1937	Havre de Grace	Chesapeake Stakes	1 1/16 miles	*0.65	7	1	6 lengths	
5-8-1937	Churchill Downs	Kentucky Derby	1 1/4 miles	*1.60	20	1	1 1/4 lengths	
5-15-1937	Pimlico	Preakness Stakes	1 3/16 miles	*0.35	8	1	head	
6-5-1937	Belmont Park	Belmont Stakes	1 1/2 miles	*0.90	7	1	3 lengths	Won the Triple Crown
10-26-1937	Laurel Park	Allowance	1 1/16 miles	*0.40	8	1	2 1/2 lengths	
10-30-1937	Laurel Park	Washington Handicap	1 1/4 miles	*0.65	7	1	1 1/2 lengths	
11-3-1937	Pimlico	Pimlico Special	1 3/16 miles	*0.05	4	1	1 1/2 lengths	
2-19-1938	Hialeah Park	Allowance	7 furlongs	*0.30	6	1	1 1/2 lengths	
3-5-1938	Hialeah Park	Widener Handicap	1 1/4 miles	*0.35	13	1	1 1/2 lengths	
6-6-1938	Aqueduct	Queens County Handicap	1 mile	*0.55	4	1	1 length	
6-29-1938	Suffolk Downs	Massachusetts Handicap	1 1/8 miles	*0.40	6	4	(8 1/4 lengths)	Track: Heavy
7-27-1938	Saratoga	Wilson Stakes	1 mile	*0.60	3	1	8 lengths	Track: Muddy, geldings not eligible
7-30-1938	Saratoga	Saratoga Handicap	1 1/4 miles	*0.70	5	1	neck	Track: sloppy
8-20-1938	Saratoga	Whitney Handicap	1 1/8 miles	*0.33	3	1	1 length	Geldings not eligible
8-27-1938	Saratoga	Saratoga Cup	1 3/4 miles	*0.33	3	1	4 lengths	
10-1-1938	Belmont Park	Jockey Club Gold Cup	2 miles	*0.08	3	1	3 lengths	Geldings not eligible
11-1-1938	Pimlico	Pimlico Special	1 3/16 miles	*0.25	2	2	(4 lengths)	Match race vs. Seabiscuit
11-12-1938	Narragansett Park	Rhode Island Handicap	1 1/8 miles	*0.20	6	1	2 1/2 lengths	
2-18-1939	Hialeah Park	Allowance	7 furlongs	*0.20	3	1	1/2 length	

An asterisk before the odds means War Admiral was the post time favorite

Source: Daily Racing Form Past Performances

== Honors and awards ==
War Admiral's grave at Kentucky Horse Park

War Admiral was elected to the Hall of Fame in the same year as arch-rival Seabiscuit. In The Blood-Horse ranking of the top 100 US thoroughbred champions of the 20th Century, War Admiral was ranked #13, with Seabiscuit as #25.

In 1937, Riddle commissioned equine artist Martin Stainforth to paint War Admiral's portrait, a version of which can be found in the National Museum of Racing and Hall of Fame.

War Admiral is buried alongside his sire at the foot of the Man o' War statue in the Kentucky Horse Park.

== In popular culture ==
The 2003 movie Seabiscuit features the match race between Seabiscuit and War Admiral. The film portrays War Admiral at 18 hands even though War Admiral and Seabiscuit were about the same size with Seabiscuit standing at 15.2 hands and outweighing War Admiral 1,040 to 960 lb (470 to 440 kg)

== Pedigree ==
Pedigree of War Admiral
Sire Man o' War	Fair Play ch. 1905	Hastings br. 1893	Spendthrift
Sire Man o' War	Fair Play ch. 1905	Hastings br. 1893	Cinderella
Sire Man o' War	Fair Play ch. 1905	Fairy Gold ch. 1896	Bend Or
Sire Man o' War	Fair Play ch. 1905	Fairy Gold ch. 1896	Dame Masham
Sire Man o' War	Mahubah b. 1910	Rock Sand br. 1900	Sainfoin
Sire Man o' War	Mahubah b. 1910	Rock Sand br. 1900	Roquebrune
Sire Man o' War	Mahubah b. 1910	Merry Token b. 1891	Merry Hampton
Sire Man o' War	Mahubah b. 1910	Merry Token b. 1891	Mizpah
Dam Brushup 1929	Sweep; 1907	Ben Brush	Bramble
Dam Brushup 1929	Sweep; 1907	Ben Brush	Roseville
Dam Brushup 1929	Sweep; 1907	Pink Domino	Domino
Dam Brushup 1929	Sweep; 1907	Pink Domino	Belle Rose
Dam Brushup 1929	Annette; 1921	Harry of Hereford	John O'Gaunt
Dam Brushup 1929	Annette; 1921	Harry of Hereford	Canterbury Pilgrim
Dam Brushup 1929	Annette; 1921	Bathing Girl	Spearmint
Dam Brushup 1929	Annette; 1921	Bathing Girl	Summer Girl

== See also ==
- List of racehorses
