= Man o' War =

American Thoroughbred racehorse

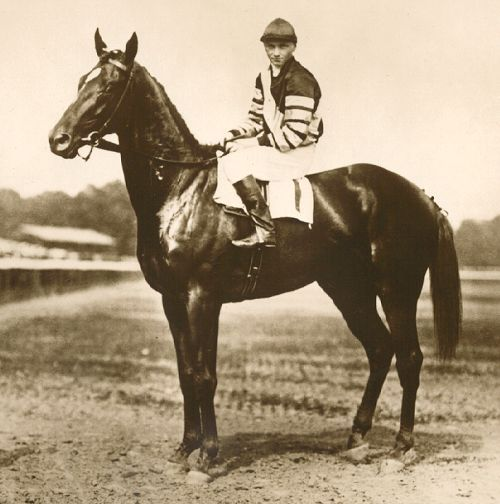
- Man o' War, 1920
- Sire: Fair Play (US)
- Grandsire: Hastings (US)
- Dam: Mahubah (US)
- Damsire: Rock Sand (GB)
- Sex: Stallion
- Foaled: March 29, 1917; Nursery Stud, Lexington, Kentucky, U.S.
- Died: November 1, 1947 (aged 30)
- Country: United States
- Color: Chestnut
- Breeder: August Belmont Jr.
- Owner: Samuel D. Riddle
- Trainer: Louis Feustel
- Record: 21: 20–1–0
- Earnings: $249,465

Major wins
- Keene Memorial Stakes (1919); Tremont Stakes (1919); United States Hotel Stakes (1919); Youthful Stakes (1919); Grand Union Hotel Stakes (1919); Hopeful Stakes (1919); Hudson Stakes (1919); Futurity Stakes (1919); Withers Stakes (1920); Stuyvesant Handicap (1920); Dwyer Stakes (1920); Miller Stakes (1920); Travers Stakes (1920); Lawrence Realization Stakes (1920); Jockey Club Gold Cup (1920); Potomac Handicap (1920); Kenilworth Park Gold Cup (1920) Triple Crown wins: Preakness Stakes (1920); Belmont Stakes (1920)

Awards
- American Champion Two-Year-Old Colt (1919); American Champion Three-Year-Old Male Horse (1920); American Horse of the Year (1920); Leading sire in North America (1926)

Honors
- U.S. Racing Hall of Fame (1957); Canadian Horse Racing Hall of Fame (2020) #1 - Top 100 U.S. Racehorses of the 20th Century; Life-size statue at Kentucky Horse Park; Man o' War Stakes at Belmont Park; Man o' War Boulevard in Lexington, Kentucky

Man o' War (March 29, 1917 – November 1, 1947) was an American Thoroughbred racehorse who is widely regarded as one of the greatest racehorses of all time. Several sports publications, including The Blood-Horse, Sports Illustrated, and the Associated Press, voted Man o' War as the best American racehorse of the 20th century. During his racing career, just after World War I, Man o' War won 20 of 21 races and $249,465 (equivalent to $4,009,000 in 2025) in purses. He was the unofficial 1920 American horse of the year and was honored with Babe Ruth as the outstanding athlete of the year by The New York Times. He was inducted into the National Museum of Racing and Hall of Fame in 1957. On March 29, 2017, the museum opened a special exhibit in his honor, "Man o' War at 100".

In 1919, Man o' War won 9 of 10 starts, including the Hopeful Stakes and Belmont Futurity, then the most important races for two-year-old horses in the United States. His only loss came at Saratoga Race Course, later nicknamed the Graveyard of Champions, where he lost by a neck to a colt named Upset.

Man o' War was not entered in the 1920 Kentucky Derby because his owner, Samuel Riddle, did not believe in racing at the distance of ten furlongs (2,000 m) (one mile and a quarter) so early in a young horse's career. Instead, Man o' War made his three-year-old debut in the Preakness Stakes where he defeated Upset by 1 1/2 lengths. Man o' War later won the Belmont Stakes by 20 lengths while setting a world record. Throughout the summer and fall, he continued to dominate his fellow three-year-olds, setting multiple records while conceding large amounts of weight to his rivals. The only time he faced older horses was in the final race of his career in a match race against Sir Barton, who had won what would later be known as the American Triple Crown in 1919. Man o' War won easily by seven lengths in the first horserace to be filmed in its entirety.

Riddle originally intended to race Man o' War in 1921 but decided against it because Man o' War would have been assigned record weights in the handicap format used in almost all races for older horses at the time. Instead, Man o' War was retired to stud, where he became a leading sire whose multiple champions included Triple Crown winner War Admiral. He was the grandsire of Seabiscuit and his sire line continues today through horses such as In Reality, Tiznow, Da' Tara and Tourist. Also successful as a broodmare sire, Man o' War is found in almost all modern American pedigrees.

== Background ==
Man o' War was a chestnut horse with a white star and stripe on his forehead. He was foaled at Nursery Stud near Lexington, Kentucky. He was bred by August Belmont Jr., whose father's accomplishments were recognized through the naming of the Belmont Stakes in 1867. Belmont Jr. was an equally notable horseman who served as the chairman of The Jockey Club from 1895 until his death in 1924. Belmont Park was named in the family's honor when it opened in 1905.

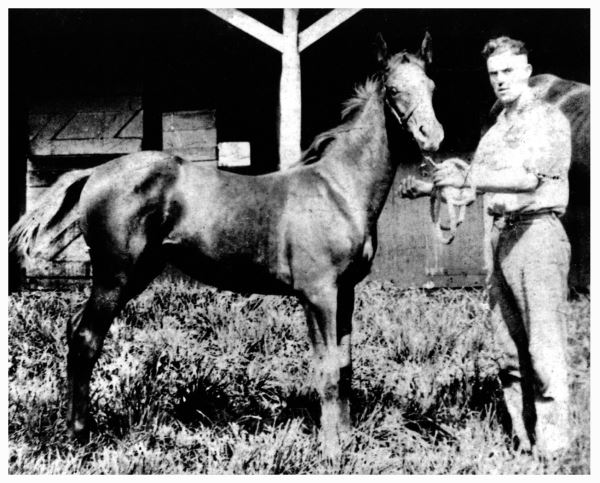
Man o' War at Nursery Stud

Man o' War was sired by Fair Play, a multiple stakes winner who finished second in the 1908 Belmont Stakes to the undefeated Colin. Man o' War was the second foal out of Mahubah, a lightly raced mare by English Triple Crown Champion Rock Sand. Not long after the colt was foaled on March 29, 1917, Belmont Jr. joined the United States Army at age 65 to serve in France during World War I. While he was overseas, his wife named the foal "Man o' War" in honor of her husband. Originally, the Belmonts intended to race Man o' War themselves. However, in the summer of 1918 with the ongoing war effort, they decided to liquidate their racing stable. At the Saratoga yearling sale, Man o' War was sold at a final bid of $5,000 (equivalent to $107,000 in 2025) to Samuel D. Riddle, who brought him to his Glen Riddle Farm near Berlin, Maryland. The underbidder at the auction was Robert L. Gerry, Sr., who is reported to have said to his wife, "Forty-five hundred is enough to spend for any yearling." Two years later in 1920, Riddle declined an offer of $400,000 for the horse.

At maturity, Man o' War stood 16.2^{1}/_{2} hands (66.5 inches, 169 cm), with prominent withers and a high croup, but was sometimes faulted for a dipped back that grew more pronounced with age. He had virtually flawless legs and solid bone, traits he passed on to his offspring. He had a slightly Roman nose and notably high head carriage. His nickname was "Big Red", though his coat had tinges of yellow and gold. An energetic, spirited horse, he is often pictured standing very still and gazing off into the distance, described as the "look of eagles". His stride was measured at 28 feet and, to this day, is believed to still be the longest of all time.

== Racing career ==
Silks of Samuel Riddle

Man o' War was the odds-on favorite in every start of his career and justified that faith even in his sole defeat. He typically won in front-running fashion and was only closely pushed in two of his starts. He won the Belmont Stakes by twenty lengths and the Lawrence Realization by a hundred lengths. He set record times in both of those races plus many more at distances ranging from 6 to 13 furlongs (1,200–2,600 m). In many of his starts, he won under heavy restraint and often conceded his rivals large amounts of weight. He retired as the then-leading money-earner in American history.

Developing this talent was not easy for trainer Louis Feustel due to Man o' War's occasionally wild temperament. In his early days, Man o' War would routinely dump his exercise riders, once getting free for over 15 minutes after a morning workout. "He fought like a tiger," Riddle later recalled. "He screamed with rage and fought us so hard that it took several days before he could be handled with safety." Feustel brought the colt along slowly and gradually settled him into a regular routine. Man o' War developed a strong bond with his groom Frank Loftus, who taught the horse to fetch and to carry his hat. Oranges were Man o' War's favorite treat.

=== 1919: Two-year-old season ===
Man o' War made his debut at Belmont Park on June 6, 1919, in a maiden race over five furlongs (1,000 m). At the time, horses raced clockwise at Belmont Park rather than counter-clockwise like all the other American tracks of the day, so horses had to learn to race in both directions. This practice ended in 1922 after Man o' War retired. He won his first race by six lengths, then three days later was entered in the Keene Memorial Stakes at a distance of 5 1/2 furlongs (1,100 m) on a muddy track at Belmont Park. At this point in his career, Man o' War had not yet learned how to start quickly but soon settled into fourth place. With an eighth of a mile remaining, jockey Johnny Loftus urged him to run and the horse responded by pulling away from his rivals to win by three lengths. Twelve days later, Man o' War followed up with another win in the Youthful Stakes at Jamaica Race Course. Two days after that, he swept to victory in the Hudson Stakes at Aqueduct to record his fourth win in 18 days. Less than two weeks later, he returned to win the Tremont Stakes at Aqueduct on July 5.

He was then shipped upstate for the summer meet at Saratoga Race Course, where the competition would be much fiercer. He made his first appearance there in the United States Hotel Stakes on August 2. Despite getting a bad start and carrying 130 pounds, Man o' War won by two lengths in his first meeting with a well-regarded colt named Upset.

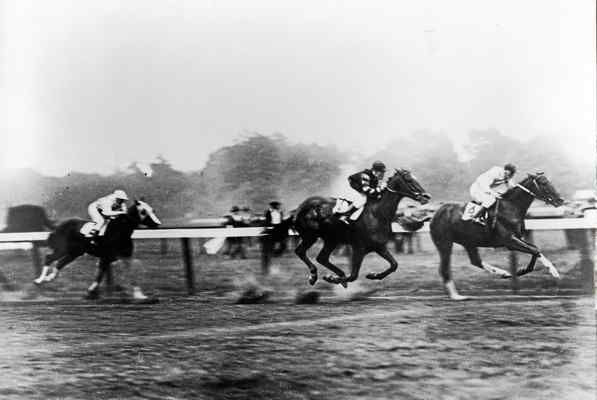
Man o' War suffers his sole defeat to Upset in the Sanford Stakes

His next start was the Sanford Memorial Stakes on August 13, where he went off as the odds-on favorite with Upset as the third betting choice. This race is notorious in racing history as Man o' War's only defeat, playing a part in developing Saratoga's reputation as the "Graveyard of Champions". In the early 1900s, there were no starting gates. Horses circled around and then lined up behind a piece of webbing known as the barrier and were sent away when it was raised. In the Sanford, most sources state that Man o' War was still circling with his back to the starting line when the barrier was raised (though some accounts say he was turned only slightly sideways). What is undisputed is that Man o' War had a terrible start, which The New York Times attributed to the absence of the regular starting official. The start was delayed for several minutes as other colts repeatedly broke through the barrier and the starter finally released the field when only the horses near the rail were ready. As a result, Man o' War was far behind the other starters. Loftus then put him in a bad position, getting boxed in by other horses, then checked by tiring horses. Despite this, Man o' War came close to winning, losing by about a neck (Note: The chart in The New York Times shows the margin as a neck while the Daily Racing Form shows the margin as a half-length.) while conceding 15 pounds to Upset.

It is sometimes erroneously thought that Upset's unexpected win popularized a new phrase in sports (meaning an underdog beating the favorite) – in fact, the term "upset" had been in use to describe such a situation for decades. The two horses faced off five times during their racing careers, with Man o' War beating Upset four times.

The loss only enhanced Man o' War's reputation. J.L. Dempsey of The Daily Racing Form wrote, "Without attempting to detract from the merits of [Upset's] performance, Man o' War proved himself in the running unquestionably the best. It was Upset's advantage at the start, coupled with 15 pounds weight concession, a perfect ride he received from Knapp and his success in saving ground on the stretch turn that brought his triumph over Man o' War. Had the race been a sixteenth farther the finish would have been reversed."

Man o' War gained his revenge with a victory in the Grand Union Hotel Stakes on August 23, beating Upset by two lengths with Blazes in third. After the race, Loftus stated that Man o' War was the best horse he had ever ridden and that his ride had been responsible for the loss in the Sanford. While carrying 130 pounds, Man o' War tied the stakes record (Note: A stakes record is the fastest time for a particular race. In his career, he set world, American, and track records as noted in the racing summary section. By definition, a world record is automatically also an American, a track, and a stakes record.) of 1:12 2/5 for six furlongs (1,200 m) that had been set by Garbage while carrying only 107 pounds (49 kg).

Seven days later, Man o' War entered the Hopeful Stakes, whose purse of $30,000 made it one of the richest prizes in racing at the time. He faced eight rivals, a small field at the time for such a prestigious race. Heavy rain started to fall as the field headed to the starting post, and Man o' War broke through the barrier several times, delaying the race by twelve minutes. Despite this, he won with "ridiculous ease" by six lengths.

Man o' War then returned to Belmont Park for the Futurity Stakes on September 14. The Futurity had a purse of $5,000 added, meaning the prize money was increased by nomination and entry fees. Because the Futurity was one of the preeminent races of the day, the added money was large enough to increase the winner's share of the purse to $26,650. (Note: By contrast, the winner of the Jockey Club Gold Cup held on the same day won only $5,650.) Man o' War briefly dueled for the lead with a well-regarded sprinter named Dominique, then opened up a commanding lead. Turning into the stretch, John P. Grier swept into second with an all-out drive but failed to make up any ground on Man o' War, who had not been urged at any point in the race and won by three lengths while carrying 127 pounds, 10 pounds more than John P. Grier. Journalists, horsemen, and fans agreed that Man o' War had to be considered as one of the greatest American horses of his age, and they compared him favorably to the unbeaten Colin. He completed his two-year-old campaign with nine wins from ten starts and earnings of $82,275. He was named the American Champion Two-Year-Old Colt of 1919. He was rated at 136 pounds by handicapper C.C. Ridley of the Daily Racing Form, 16 pounds ahead of the second-ranked colt, Blazes.

=== 1920: Three-year-old season ===
In 1920, Johnny Loftus was denied a renewal of his jockey's license by The Jockey Club, a development that was rumored to be related to Man o' War's defeat in the Sanford. He was replaced as the colt's rider by Clarence Kummer. Over the winter, Man o' War had grown to 16.2 hands (66 inches, 168 cm) high and filled out to about 1,150 pounds (520 kg) with a 72 inches (180 cm) girth.

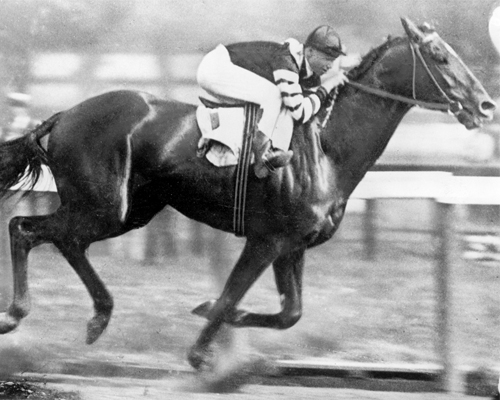
Man o' War at age three

Riddle decided early on to restrict Man o' War to races within his own age division, in large part because the most valuable races in the country were restricted to three-year-olds. He decided not to enter him in the Kentucky Derby because it was run only a few days before his preferred target, the Preakness Stakes, which was held close to the Riddle farm where Man o' War had spent the winter. Riddle also did not like racing in Kentucky and believed it was too early in the year for a young horse to go a mile and a quarter. Thus, Man o' War did not have a chance to complete what later became known as the U.S. Triple Crown of Thoroughbred Racing, consisting of the Kentucky Derby, Preakness Stakes, and Belmont Stakes. The previous year, Sir Barton had won the three races, which gained in prestige and importance 10 years later when Gallant Fox accomplished the same feat under a great deal of media attention.

Instead, Man o' War made his three-year-old debut on May 18 in the Preakness Stakes, then run at a distance of 1 1/8 miles. Despite the long layoff and never having raced beyond six furlongs (1,200 m), he went off as the 4-5 favorite in a field of nine horses that included his old rival Upset, who had finished second in the Derby. Man o' War broke alertly and took the lead within the first 10 yards, then established a two-length lead down the backstretch while under restraint. As they rounded the final turn, Upset started to close ground so Kummer loosened his grip. Man o' War responded by again pulling away, completing the opening mile in what would have been a new Pimlico track record of 1:38 3/5. Eased in the final furlong, he won by 1 1/2 lengths over Upset in a final time of 1:51 3/5.

The horse was then returned to his home base at Belmont Park, where a crowd of 25,000 turned out to watch him in the Withers Stakes on May 29. He was sent off at "generous" odds of 1–7 against two rivals: Wildair, winner of the Metropolitan Handicap who was at odds of 6–1, and the overmatched David Harum at 30–1. Man o' War again seized the early lead, completing the first quarter-mile in :23 3/5 while tugging at the bit. When Wildair tried to close ground around the turn, Kummer briefly released his hold and Man o' War opened up his lead again. Eased in the final sixteenth of a mile, he won by two lengths while setting an American race record of 1:35 4/5 for the mile. (Note: Man o' War's time of 1:35 4/5 in the Withers broke the American race record for a mile by 2/5 second. However, in a time trial in 1918, Roamer completed a mile in 1:34 4/5.)

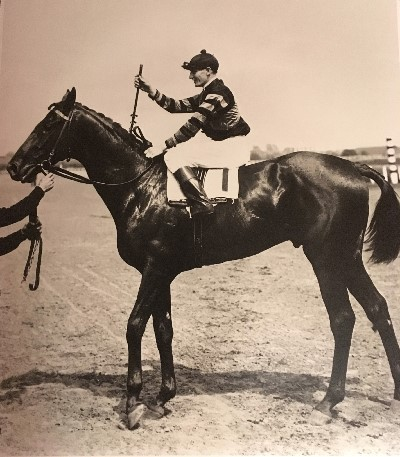
Man o' War after winning the Belmont Stakes

Man o' War's next start was on June 12 in the Belmont Stakes, then run at a distance of 1 3/8 miles. The race establish him as one of the all-time greats with an "almost unbelievably brilliant performance" before a crowd of 25,000. At odds of 1-20, he faced one rival, the well-regarded colt Donnaconna. Man o' War led from the start, and Kummer let him run freely at the top of the stretch, allowing Man o' War to draw away by 20 lengths. Although eased in the final furlong, he set a world record of 2:14 1/5, beating the previous standard set in England by over two seconds and beating Sir Barton's American record by over three seconds. This time stood as the American record for the distance until 1961, when Wise Ship ran 1 3/8 miles in 2:14 flat on a turf course. It stood as the American dirt record until 1991.

Ten days later, Man o' War returned in the Stuyvesant Handicap, which he won against one rival. His odds of 1 to 100 were believed to be the lowest ever offered in an American horse race.

His next start in the Dwyer Stakes on July 10 proved far more demanding. The colt John P. Grier, who had challenged Man o' War in the Belmont Futurity at age two, had matured into the second-best three-year-old in the country. Under the conditions of the Dwyer, Man o' War was assigned 126 pounds while John P. Grier carried only 108. The two colts scared away all rivals, turning the Dwyer into a match race. They raced side by side down the backstretch, with Man o' War on the rail blocking John P. Grier from the view of the spectators. The horses ran the race as a sprint, completing the first three-quarters of a mile in 1:09 2/5 – an American record. As they entered the turn, Man o' War started to open up an advantage but John P. Grier rallied and got back on even terms. They completed the mile together in a time of 1:35 3/5, breaking Man o' War's American record set in the Withers. John P. Grier made another surge, and for a moment the spectators believed that he would win the race. Kummer then hit Man o' War with the whip, and he made a final surge, opening up a lead of two lengths in the final fifty yards. The final time was 1:49 1/5, a world record for 1 1/8 miles.

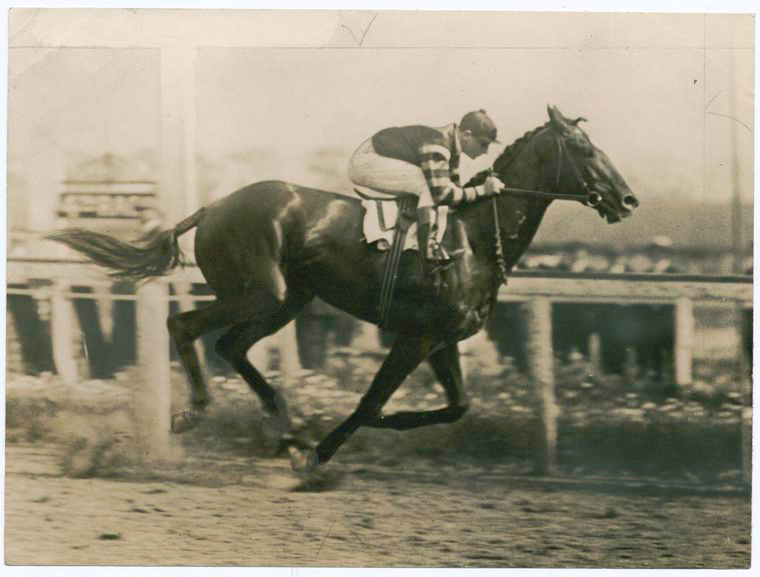
Man o' War in the summer of 1920

Man o' War was then shipped to Saratoga and was entered in the Miller Stakes on August 7. There was a then-record crowd of 35,000, many of whom gathered in the saddling area where Man o' War was surrounded by twelve Pinkerton guards. His jockey for the race was Earl Sande, replacing an injured Kummer. As expected, Man o' War took the early lead and was unchallenged in a six-length victory. He had been tightly restrained, but even so, his time of 1:56 3/5 for the distance of 1 3/16 miles was just 3/5 seconds off the track record. "I never felt anything like that horse in my life," said Sande after the race. "He strides farther than anything I ever rode and does it so handily that you would not think he was running at all."

His connections had a brief scare when Man o' War exhibited signs of lameness after a workout on August 17, but he quickly recovered. On August 21, he entered the Travers Stakes where he faced his two strongest rivals: Upset for the fifth and last time, and John P. Grier for the third time. A record crowd overflowed the grandstand and stretched down the rail and track apron. As a result, Saratoga management opened the infield, and 5,000 people moved across the track to line the inner rail.

Man o' War's jockey for the race was Andy Schuttinger as Kummer was still recovering from injury and Sande was not available. After the start, John P. Grier tried to match strides with Man o' War but could not keep up. After establishing a clear lead by the first turn, Schuttinger took hold of Man o' War for the rest of the race. Upset made a late run to move into second, but Man o' War won by three lengths. Despite not being extended, he completed the distance of 1 1/4 miles in 2:01 4/5, equaling the track record set earlier in the year by Sir Barton. This record stood until 1941. It is possible the time was also a world record, as the existing record time of 2:00 flat credited to Whisk Broom II in 1913 was disputed.

Riddle contemplated entering Man o' War against older horses for the first time in the $5,000 Saratoga Gold Cup but ultimately chose to enter the $15,000 Lawrence Realization Stakes against three-year-olds instead. When his only rival scratched from the race, it nearly became a walkover until Mrs. Riddle's niece, Sarah Jeffords, entered Hoodwink. To compensate for the lack of competition, Riddle announced that Man o' War would be allowed to show his speed. He was reunited with regular jockey Kummer, after being ridden by Sande and Schuttinger while Kummer recovered from an injury. Kummer neither restrained the horse nor urged him at any point in the race. Running as he pleased, Man o' War won by slightly more than a quarter-mile – the official margin was 100 lengths – while setting a world record of 2:40 4/5 for a mile and five-eighths. This broke the world record set in England by 1 3/5 seconds and lowered the American record by over four seconds. This world record stood until 1956, when it was broken by Man o' War's great-grandson Swaps.

The performance drew superlatives from the racing community. Turf writer B.K. Beckwith later called it "the most astounding display of arrogant annihilation", adding, "[Man o' War] was like a big red sheet of flame running before a prairie wind". The New York Times commented, "at Belmont Park yesterday [Man o' War] gave what was undoubtedly the greatest exhibition of speed over a considerable distance of ground ever witnessed anywhere."

Man o' War's next start was the Jockey Club Gold Cup on September 12, the first time he entered a race open to older horses. The race organizers tried to lure Sir Barton into entering by promising to increase the purse from $15,000 to $25,000 if he did so, but Sir Barton needed more time to recover from his last race. It was also speculated that Sir Barton's owner was holding out for an even higher purse for a match race with Man o' War. The connections of Exterminator, another future Hall of Famer, were also considering the race but bypassed it because, under the weight-for-age conditions of the Gold Cup, he would have had to concede Man o' War five pounds. As it was, Man o' War faced only one competitor and won under tight restraint by fifteen lengths. Although it was declared a hollow victory by The New York Times, Man o' War still set an American record for 1 1/2 miles of 2:28 4/5, breaking the existing mark by 4/5 seconds.

Man o' War next entered the Potomac Handicap at Havre de Grace Racetrack in Maryland on September 18. He was assigned 138 pounds, conceding from 24 to 34 pounds to his rivals, which included Kentucky Derby winner Paul Jones. Man o' War faced an early challenge from Blazes, then turned back a late run by Wildair to win by 1 1/2 lengths while breaking the track record by 1/5 seconds. Although Man o' War was not seriously challenged, the high weight and a poorly maintained racing surface took a toll: He came out of the race with a swollen tendon on his right foreleg.

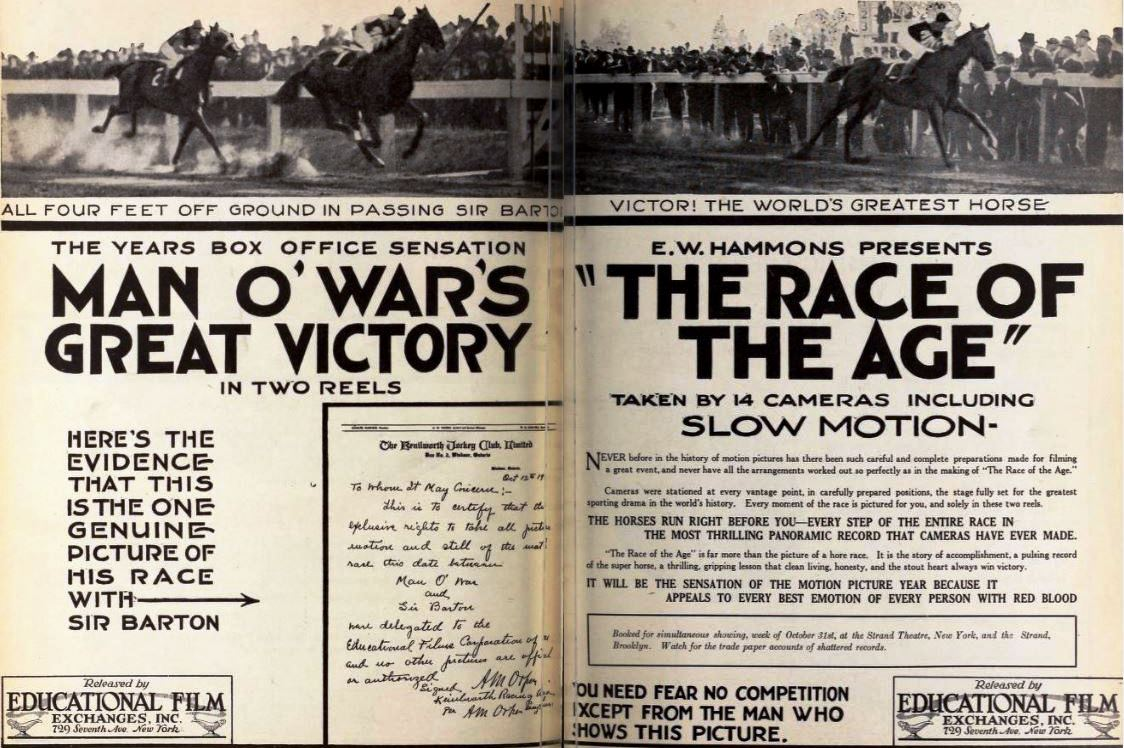
"The Race of the Age"

The final start of Man o' War's career came in Windsor, Ontario, Canada, in the Kenilworth Park Gold Cup on October 12. The event was so highly anticipated that it became the first horse race to be filmed in its entirety, with the resulting footage later shown in movie theaters across the country. The race was originally intended to be a face-off between the three great horses of the time: Man o' War, Sir Barton, and Exterminator. However, the owners of Sir Barton and Man o' War agreed to a distance of 1 1/4 miles, which was too short for Exterminator to run his best, and they agreed to a weight-for-age format, under which the older Exterminator would concede weight to Man o' War. Therefore, Exterminator was not entered, and in fact, raced that same day on a different track.

In what was now essentially a match race, the advantage shifted to Man o' War, whose front-running style allowed him to dictate the pace. He was almost flat-footed at the break but quickly gathered speed to draw clear of Sir Barton in the first furlong. Kummer then slowed the pace while maintaining a two-length lead down the backstretch. On the final turn, Man o' War put in a brief spurt and quickly opened the lead to five lengths. Kummer again pulled him in and Man o' War maintained a steady pace to the wire to win by seven lengths in a "ridiculously easy" fashion. Although the time of 2:03 was well off the American record shared by Man o' War and Sir Barton, it still broke the track record by over six seconds. Man o' War's share of the purse made him the highest-earning horse in American history. The gold trophy presented in the winner's circle, designed by Tiffany & Co, was later donated by Mrs. Riddle to Saratoga and is now used as the trophy for the Travers Stakes.

There were no formal awards for American Horse of the Year at the time, but Man o' War was informally acknowledged as such in a retroactive poll of turf writers. In its summary of the sporting year, The New York Times stated, "A superman (Babe Ruth) and a superhorse – these were sport's greatest contributions to the history of the year about to close. Some might rate the superhorse, Man o' War, as the outstanding figure of the two, for he has passed on from the field of competition and has left a story of achievement which may never be surpassed."

Over his two-year career, Man o' War won 20 of 21 races, setting three world records, two American records, and three track records.

=== Weight carrying ===
At the time, there were few weight-for-age races in the United States. The majority of races were run under handicap conditions, with better horses being assigned higher weights in an attempt to equalize the chances of the other horses in the field. As one writer put it, "the one certain thing about racing is that weight will eventually stop the greatest of racers and bring them down to equal terms with horses of much less quality." As a two-year-old, Man o' War carried 130 pounds (59 kg) in six races; few racehorses have ever carried that much at any age. As a three-year-old, he carried as much as 138 pounds (63 kg) in races, conceding as much as 34 pounds (15 kg) to other horses. Had he raced at age four, the handicappers would have started him at 140 pounds, increasing the amount each time he won until such time as Man o' War either lost or was injured. For this reason, Riddle decided to retire him at the end of his three-year-old campaign.

== Race record ==
Date	Track	Distance	Race	Finish	Margin	Time	Weight (lbs)	Ref
June 6, 1919	Belmont Park	5 furlongs	maiden	1	6 lengths	0:59 flat	115	
June 9, 1919	Belmont Park	5 1/2 furlongs	Keene Memorial Stakes	1	3 lengths	1:05 3/5	115	
June 21, 1919	Jamaica Race Course	5 1/2 furlongs	Youthful Stakes	1	2 1/2 lengths	1:06 3/5	120	
June 23, 1919	Aqueduct	5 furlongs	Hudson Stakes	1	1 1/2 lengths	1:01 3/5	130	
July 5, 1919	Aqueduct	6 furlongs	Tremont Stakes	1	1 length	1:13	130	
August 2, 1919	Saratoga Race Course	6 furlongs	United States Hotel Stakes	1	2 lengths over Upset	1:12 2/5 (Note: Tied stakes record)	130	
August 13, 1919	Saratoga Race Course	6 furlongs	Sanford Memorial	2	about a neck behind Upset	1:11 1/5 (Note: Upset broke the existing stakes record by 2 1/5 seconds)	130	
August 23, 1919	Saratoga Race Course	6 furlongs	Grand Union Hotel Stakes	1	1 length over Upset	1:12 (Note: New stakes record, breaking Sweep On's record by two-fifths of a second)	130	
August 30, 1919	Saratoga Race Course	6 furlongs	Hopeful Stakes	1	6 lengths over John P. Grier	1:13	130	
September 12, 1919	Belmont Park	6 furlongs	Belmont Futurity	1	2 1/2 lengths	1:11 3/5 (Note: Fastest Futurity since the race was moved to Belmont Park in 1913)	127	
May 18, 1920	Pimlico Race Course	1 1/8 miles	Preakness Stakes	1	1 1/2 lengths over Upset	1:51 3/5	126	
May 29, 1920	Belmont Park	1 mile	Withers Stakes	1	2 lengths	1:35 4/5 (Note: Tied American race record)	118	
June 12, 1920	Belmont Park	1 3/8 miles	Belmont Stakes	1	20 lengths	2:14 1/5 (Note: New world record)	126	
June 22, 1920	Jamaica Race Course	1 mile	Stuyvesant Handicap	1	8 lengths	1:41 3/5	135	
July 10, 1920	Aqueduct	1 1/8 miles	Dwyer Stakes	1	1 1/2 lengths over John P. Grier	1:49 1/5 (Note: New world record for 1 1/8 miles. Also set American records for 6 furlongs and 1 mile)	126	
August 7, 1920	Saratoga Race Course	1 3/16 miles	Miller Stakes	1	6 lengths	1:56 3/5	131	
August 21, 1920	Saratoga Race Course	1 1/4 miles	Travers Stakes	1	3 lengths over Upset and John P. Grier	2:01 4/5 (Note: Tied track record)	129	
September 4, 1920	Belmont Park	1 5/8 miles	Lawrence Realization Stakes	1	>100 lengths	2:40 4/5 (Note: New world record)	126	
September 12, 1920	Belmont Park	1 1/2 miles	Jockey Club Gold Cup	1	15 lengths	2:28 4/5 (Note: New American record)	118	
September 18, 1920	Havre de Grace	1 1/16 miles	Potomac Handicap	1	1 1/2 lengths	1:44 4/5 (Note: New track record)	138	
October 12, 1920	Kenilworth Park	1 1/4 miles	Kenilworth Park Gold Cup	1	7 lengths over Sir Barton	2:03 (Note: New Track record)	120	

== Stud record ==
"He's got everythin' a horse ought to have and he's got it where a horse ought to have it. He's the mostest horse."

— Will Harbut

After his undefeated season as a three-year-old, Man o' War was retired to stud in Lexington, originally at Elizabeth Daingerfield's Hinata Farm. In May 1922, he was moved to Faraway Farm, a property on Huffman Mill Pike outside of Lexington that had been jointly purchased by Riddle, his wife's niece Sarah Jeffords and her husband, Walter. This land, including the stallion barn, is now part of Mt. Brilliant Farm. In late 1936 or early 1937, the Riddle horses were moved to an adjacent property, also called Faraway Farm, where Man o' War spent his final years. This portion of Faraway is now called Man o' War Farm.

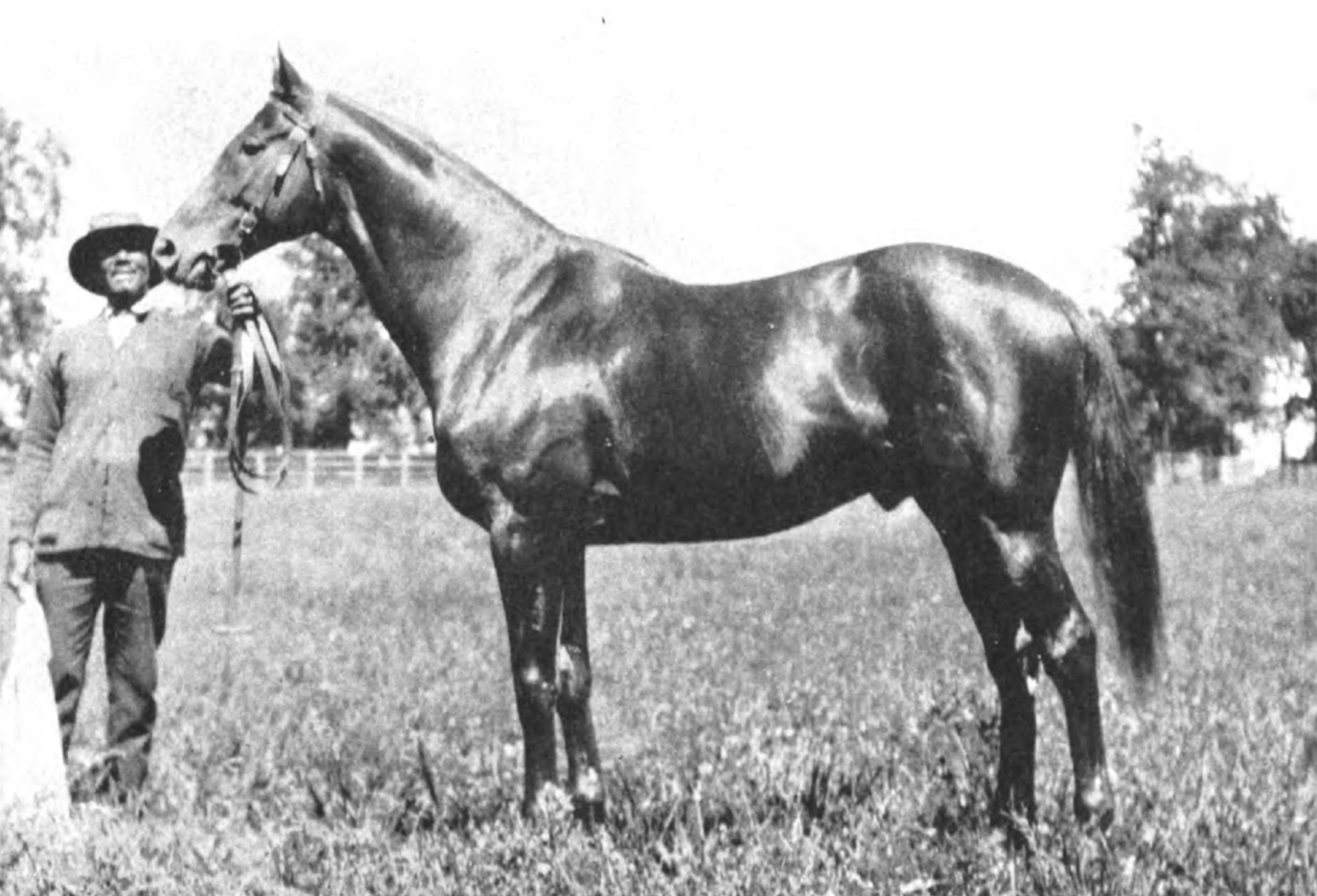
Man o' War at stud

During his lifetime, over 500,000 people signed the guest book at Faraway Farm and as many as 1.5 million are estimated to have visited him there. His longtime groom, Will Harbut, would lead the stallion out on display and proudly proclaim his charge's many accomplishments. Man o' War and Harbut were featured together on the cover of the Saturday Evening Post in 1941. This photograph inspired a popular collectors' plate, "Forever Friends", by equine artist Fred Stone.

Man o' War was the leading sire in North America of 1926 and was runner-up in 1928, 1929 and 1937. The Jockey Club credits him with 62 stakes winners from 381 named foals. Riddle restricted Man o' War's book to about 25 mares a year, most of which were owned by him or his friends and family. Though many breeding experts believe that Riddle did not breed the stallion to enough good mares (especially after the first five seasons), he still sired many leading horses. Man o' War's first crop included three horses who were considered champions: American Flag (Belmont Stakes), Florence Nightingale (Coaching Club American Oaks) and Maid at War (Alabama Stakes). His second crop was highlighted by Crusader, who won the Belmont Stakes in 1926 and was largely accepted as the best racehorse of 1926. Among Man o' War's other famous offspring were 1929 Kentucky Derby winner Clyde Van Dusen, Battleship (who won the 1934 American Grand National and the 1938 English Grand National steeplechase) the only horse who has accomplished this record, and War Admiral, the 1937 Triple Crown winner and the second official Horse of the Year. Another of his offspring, Hard Tack, sired Seabiscuit, who was Horse of the Year in 1938.

Man o' War's most successful sons at stud were War Admiral and War Relic, and War Relic's branch of the male line survives today. Tiznow, Tourist, Da' Tara, In Reality, Desert Vixen, Honour and Glory, Bal a Bali, Skywalker and Bertrando are all sire-line descendants of Man o' War. His line is also still active in Europe through classic winner Known Fact and his champion son Warning.

Man o' War's influence in modern pedigrees is magnified by the success of his daughters as broodmares. Although Man o' War never led the broodmare sire list, he was the runner-up ten times and finished in the top ten 22 times. Female line descendants from Man o' War include Eight Thirty, Stymie, Nijinsky, Sword Dancer, Pavot, Riverman, Jim French, Sir Ivor and Kelso. War Admiral was also a leading broodmare sire, especially when crossed with the influential mare La Troienne and his name can be found in many modern pedigrees through such horses as Seattle Slew, Buckpasser and Dr. Fager. American Flag also contributed to Man o' War's modern influence as he was the sire of the second dam of Raise A Native, who is an almost "omnipresent name in American pedigrees". Some modern breeders design matings to concentrate the influence of Man o' War through deep inbreeding. For example, he appears 23 times in the bloodline of American Pharoah, the 2015 Triple Crown winner. (Note: Man o' War appears in American Pharoah's deep bloodline, through Fappiano (through Raise a Native, Dr. Fager and twice through Grand Splendor), Gana Facil (twice through War Relic and twice through War Admiral), El Gran Senor (twice through his dam Sex Appeal), Image of Reality (four times), Key to the Kingdom (through her dam Key Bridge), Her Native (through Pavot), Terlingua (twice through her dam Crimson Saint), Flying Paster (through his dam Procne), Sown (through her sire Grenfall), Exclusive Native (through Raise A Native), Minnetonka (through her dam Heliolight), and Tri Jet (through his sire Jester).)

== Death ==
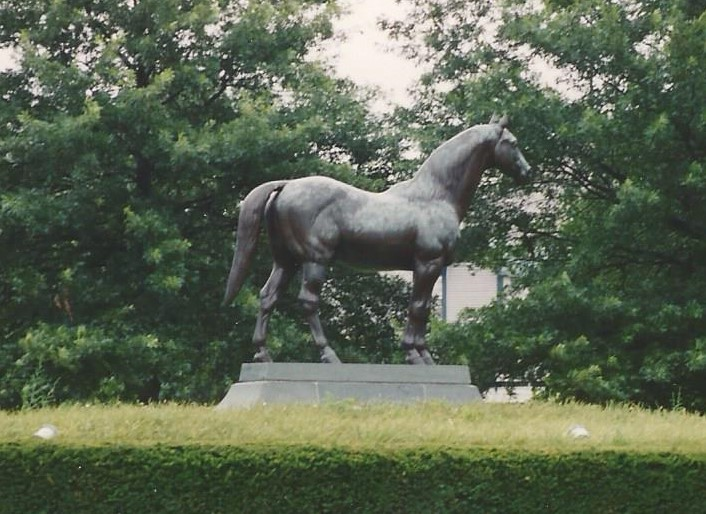
The Man o' War statue at the Kentucky Horse Park

Man o' War was retired from stud in 1943 after suffering a heart attack. He died on November 1, 1947, at age 30 of another apparent heart attack, a short time after Harbut died. His funeral was broadcast live on NBC Radio. Kentucky horseman Ira Drymon said, "He touched the imagination of men and they saw different things in him. But one thing they will all remember was that he brought exaltation into their hearts." An editorial in The New York Times stated:

"No other horse ever won such fame as Man o' War. None was more beautiful, with lovelier lines of grace and power. None was more beloved by an admiring and faithful public. Few have lived so long. The American scene seems a little vacant with Man o' War gone to the Elysian Fields where all good horses go."

Man o' War was embalmed and buried in a casket lined with Riddle's black-and-gold racing silks. He was originally interred at Faraway Farm, but in the early 1970s, he was re-interred at a new burial site at the Kentucky Horse Park, where his grave is marked with a statue by American sculptor Herbert Haseltine.

== Legacy ==
Man o' War was inducted into the National Museum of Racing and Hall of Fame in 1957. In 1959, the Man o' War Stakes was created in his honor. In The Blood-Horse magazine 1999 ranking of the top 100 U.S. Thoroughbred champions of the 20th Century, Man o' War was ranked No. 1. He was also ranked No. 1 by the Associated Press as the greatest horse of the 20th century in a separate poll. He was also ranked No. 1 greatest horse in racing history by Sports Illustrated (panel of 7) in 1992. ESPN ranked Man o' War as number 84 on their list of the top North American athletes of the 20th century, compiled for the SportsCentury documentary series. He was one of three racehorses on their list, along with Secretariat (34th) and Citation (97th).

There is a roadside historical marker at the location of his birthplace in Lexington (Nursery Stud), though the site has since been redeveloped. The stallion barn at Faraway Farm where he spent most of his life was renovated in the early 2000s - it is now part of Mt. Brilliant Farm. His stall door was loaned to the National Museum of Racing and Hall of Fame in Saratoga as part a special exhibit, "Man o' War at 100", that opened on March 29, 2017.

Glen Riddle Farm in Maryland was home to Man o' War during the off seasons of his racing career. The land was redeveloped in the early 2000s as GlenRiddle, a gated community with two golf courses, one of which is named in Man o' War's honor. The barn in which Man o' War stayed was converted into the golf clubhouse. In the 1950s, the Riddle estate sold the property Riddle had owned in Glen Riddle, Pennsylvania, which became the Riddlewood housing development. One of the roads in Riddlewood is named Man o' War Drive, another is War Admiral Lane. Man o' War Boulevard, a major arterial that circles to the south of Lexington, is also named in the horse's honor. Central of Georgia Railway once ran a Man o' War passenger train between Atlanta and Columbus.

=== In books and film ===
He has been the subject of several biographies. The first, titled Big Red, was by C. W. Anderson and was published in 1943. Man o' War, by Page Cooper and Roger Treat, was published in 1950, and is a classic of its kind. Walter Farley, author of The Black Stallion series, also wrote a slightly fictional biography of Man o' War in 1962. In 2000, Edward L. Bowen wrote a biography called Man o' War: Thoroughbred Legends from Eclipse Press. In 2006, Dorothy Ours wrote a new, extensively sourced biography titled Man o' War: A Legend Like Lightning. Man o' War is also featured in several books on Thoroughbred breeding, including Avalyn Hunter's American Classic Pedigrees (1914–2002).

In 1925, Man o' War was seen in the film Kentucky Pride which was directed by John Ford.

=== Cultural references ===
In Sterling A. Brown's poem about Kentucky and an African American in pre-Civil Rights America, "Kentucky Blues" from Southern Road, a reference is made to Man o' War. The poem discusses Thoroughbred horses and other characteristics attributed to the state.

According to Joey DeMaio, the heavy metal band Manowar was named after the horse.

In the 1970 motion picture M*A*S*H, the character Trapper John makes the apocryphal claim that a necropsy performed upon Man o' War following his death revealed that he was a homosexual horse, despite his prolific breeding history.

The song "Action Man" by the band Widespread Panic tells the story of Man o' War. The song references his Sire and Dam, Fair Play and Mahubah, as well as his offspring War Admiral.

== Sire line tree ==
- Man o' War
  - Annapolis
    - Mercator
  - American Flag
    - Gusto
  - Gun Boat
  - Crusader
    - Crossbow II
    - Royal Crusader
  - Mars
  - Scapa Flow
  - Clyde Van Dusen
  - Hard Tack
    - Seabiscuit
      - Sea Sovereign
      - Sea Swallow
  - Battleship
    - Floating Isle
    - Navigate
    - War Battle
    - Tide Rips
    - Navy Gun
    - Sea Legs
    - Eolus
    - Cap-A-Pie
    - Mighty Mo
    - Shipboard
  - Fleet Flag
  - Blockade
  - Ship Executive
  - Tsukitomo
  - War Admiral
    - Blue Peter
    - Mr Busher
    - Cold Command
    - Navy Page
    - Admiral Vee
  - Great War
  - War Relic
    - Relic
      - Buisson Ardent
        - Roan Rocket
      - El Relicario
        - UN Prince
      - Polic
        - Polyfoto
      - Mystic II
        - Babamist
        - Bewley's Hill
        - Freeman's Hill
      - Olden Times
        - Roving Boy
      - Pericles
      - Pieces of Eight
        - Stateff
    - Battlefield
    - Intent
      - Intentionally
        - In Reality
        - Tentam
        - Group Plan
    - Missile

== Pedigree ==
Man o' War's grandsire Hastings was purchased by August Belmont Jr. as a two-year-old and won the Belmont Stakes for him in 1896. Hastings had a notoriously vicious temperament that he tended to pass on to his offspring in varying degrees. The mare Fairy Gold, a stakes-winning daughter of Epsom Derby winner Bend Or, was imported by Belmont to America and bred to Hastings in 1904. The resulting foal was Fair Play, who was one of the best racehorses of his year and even better as a stallion, leading the American sire list three times (1920, 1924 and 1927). Fair Play inherited a difficult temperament from Hastings, and his disposition was completely soured after an unsuccessful period spent racing in England. In addition to Man o' War, he also sired Hall of Famer Discovery.

Belmont Jr. also bred the mare Mahubah, who raced only five times with one win. She was the daughter of Rock Sand, who was imported by Belmont to the United States after winning the English Triple Crown. Mahubah produced five foals, all of them by Fair Play, including Man o' War and stakes winner My Play. Mahubah is also the fourth dam of American Triple Crown winner Assault.

Pedigree of Man o' War, chestnut horse, foaled in 1917
Sire Fair Play chestnut 1905	Hastings brown 1893	Spendthrift chestnut 1876	*Australian
Sire Fair Play chestnut 1905	Hastings brown 1893	Spendthrift chestnut 1876	Aerolite
Sire Fair Play chestnut 1905	Hastings brown 1893	*Cinderella bay 1888	Tomahawk (GB)
Sire Fair Play chestnut 1905	Hastings brown 1893	*Cinderella bay 1888	Manna (GB)
Sire Fair Play chestnut 1905	*Fairy Gold chestnut 1896	Bend Or (GB) chestnut 1877	Doncaster (GB)
Sire Fair Play chestnut 1905	*Fairy Gold chestnut 1896	Bend Or (GB) chestnut 1877	Rouge Rose (GB)
Sire Fair Play chestnut 1905	*Fairy Gold chestnut 1896	Dame Masham (GB) brown 1889	Galliard (GB)
Sire Fair Play chestnut 1905	*Fairy Gold chestnut 1896	Dame Masham (GB) brown 1889	Pauline (GB)
Dam Mahubah bay 1910	*Rock Sand brown 1900	Sainfoin (GB) chestnut 1887	Springfield (GB)
Dam Mahubah bay 1910	*Rock Sand brown 1900	Sainfoin (GB) chestnut 1887	Sanda (GB)
Dam Mahubah bay 1910	*Rock Sand brown 1900	Roquebrune (GB) brown 1893	St. Simon (GB)
Dam Mahubah bay 1910	*Rock Sand brown 1900	Roquebrune (GB) brown 1893	St. Marguerite (GB)
Dam Mahubah bay 1910	*Merry Token bay 1891	Merry Hampton (GB) brown 1884	Hampton (GB)
Dam Mahubah bay 1910	*Merry Token bay 1891	Merry Hampton (GB) brown 1884	Doll Tearsheet (GB)
Dam Mahubah bay 1910	*Merry Token bay 1891	Mizpah bay 1880 (GB)	Macgregor (GB)
Dam Mahubah bay 1910	*Merry Token bay 1891	Mizpah bay 1880 (GB)	Underhand Mare (GB) (Family: 4-c)

An asterisk before a horse's name means the horse was imported to the United States.

Through his sire, Man o' War is a descendant of the first English Triple Crown champion, West Australian. This male line traces to the Godolphin Arabian (Man o' War is 14 generations removed from the Godolphin Arabian).

== See also ==
- List of leading Thoroughbred racehorses
- List of racehorses

== Bibliography ==
- Bowen, Edward L. (2000), Man o' War: Thoroughbred Legends, Lexington, KY: Eclipse Press, ISBN 1-58150-040-8.
- Cooper, Page & Treat, Roger L. (2004) [1950], Man o' War (Reprinted ed.), Yardley: Westholme Publishing, ISBN 1-59416-005-8.
- Hewitt, A. S. (1982), The Great Breeders and Their Methods, Lexington, KY: Thoroughbred Publishers.
- Ours, Dorothy (2006), Man o' War: A Legend Like Lightning, New York: St. Martin's Press, ISBN 0-312-34099-0.
