= Glen Riddle Farm =

Horse farm in Maryland

Coordinates: 38°21′N 75°9′W

Glen Riddle Farm was a large horse farm in Berlin, Maryland in the United States. Located on what today is Route 50 between Ocean City and Berlin, it was owned by a wealthy textile businessman Samuel D. Riddle who named it for his home town Glen Riddle, Pennsylvania which in turn had been named for his grandfather.

In addition to the stables and large mansion, Glen Riddle Farm had a one-mile racing oval for training thoroughbred racehorses. The farm was home to Hall of Fame racehorses Man o' War, U.S. Triple Crown winner War Admiral, Crusader as well as other successful thoroughbreds such as Massachusetts Handicap winner War Relic, and American Flag, a son of Man o' War who won the 1925 Belmont Stakes and was voted Champion 3-year-old Male Horse.

As part of a program honoring important horse racing tracks and racing stables, the Pennsylvania Railroad named its baggage car #5849 the "Glen Riddle Farm".

Samuel D. Riddle raced horses until his death in 1951 after which his heirs took over the property. A fire in 1969 destroyed the mansion and the farm was soon abandoned, left in disrepair for more than thirty years until real estate developers acquired it and built a residential housing complex in 2004.

In the mid-1920s, Samuel Riddle acquired Faraway Farm in Lexington, Kentucky where he would send his broodmares along with Man o' War, American Flag, and other stallions.

Glen Riddle Farm has been developed recently into a housing complex and golf club.

Glen Riddle Farm's horses won numerous important stakes races including the following prestigious U.S. Triple Crown races:

- Kentucky Derby:
  - 1937 : War Admiral
- Preakness Stakes:
  - 1920 : Man o' War
  - 1937 : War Admiral
- Belmont Stakes:
  - 1920 : Man o' War
  - 1925 : American Flag
  - 1926 : Crusader
  - 1937 : War Admiral

== Old appearance of farm ==
Part of the old appearance of the property (before development began) was a large field of primarily Purple Deadnettle's, with a few trees in the middle, housing a family graveyard.
