= Give Notice =

British-bred Thoroughbred racehorse

- Sire: Warning
- Grandsire: Known Fact
- Dam: Princess Genista
- Damsire: Ile de Bourbon
- Sex: Gelding
- Foaled: 18 May 1997
- Country: United Kingdom
- Colour: Bay
- Breeder: Ian Stewart-Brown and Michael Meacock
- Owner: Ian Stewart-Brown and Michael Meacock
- Trainer: John Dunlop
- Record: 27: 7-3-4
- Earnings: £185,219

Major wins
- Stubbs Stakes (2001); Sagaro Stakes (2002); Prix du Cadran (2002)

Give Notice (foaled 18 May 1997 – after 2004) was a British Thoroughbred racehorse. He showed no discernible promise as a juvenile in 1999 but over the next two seasons he made steady progress, winning five times in handicap races over extended distances. He emerged as a top-class stayer in 2002 when he won the Sagaro Stakes and the Prix du Cadran. Apart from his victories he finished second in the Goodwood Cup and third in the Cesarewitch

== Background ==
Give Notice was a bay horse bred in England by his owners Ian Stewart-Brown and Michael Meacock. He was gelded before the start of his racing career and was sent into training with John Dunlop at Arundel, West Sussex.

He sired by Warning, the top-rated European racehorse of 1988 who stood as a breeding stallion in Europe before being exported to Japan. The best of his other progeny included Diktat, Piccolo, Charnwood Forest (Queen Anne Stakes) and Annus Mirabilis (Dubai Duty Free). Warning was a male-line descendant of the Godolphin Arabian, unlike more than 95% of modern thoroughbreds, who trace their ancestry to the Darley Arabian. Give Notice's dam Princess Genista won two minor races from eleven attempts but did better as a broodmare as her other foals included Times Up, the dual winner of the Doncaster Cup. She was descended from the Italian broodmare Violetta, whose other descendants included Teenoso, Sir Percy, Rule of Law, Give Thanks and Harayir.

== Racing career ==
=== 1999: two-year-old season ===
In his first racecourse appearance Give Notice contested a maiden race over seven furlongs on 12 October at Leicester in which he started at odds of 10/1 and finished sixth of the nine runners, seventeen lengths behind the winner. Fifteen days later he came home ninth in a similar event over the same distance on good-to-soft ground at Yarmouth Racecourse. He followed up with wins in minor handicaps at Haydock Park and Kempton in July but when moved up in class he finished towards the rear of the field in more valuable events at Goodwood and York.

=== 2000: three-year-old season ===
On his three-year-old debut Give Notice ran unplaced in a maiden over one mile at Leicester Racecourse on 30 March. The gelding spent the rest of his season competing in handicap races. After finishing sixth over ten furlongs at Redcar in May he was stepped up in distance and recorded his first success over fourteen furlongs at Yarmouth Racecourse a month later.

=== 2001: four-year-old season ===
As a four-year-old Give Notice continued to race in handicaps over extended distances and showed steady improvement. He finished second at Newmarket, fourth at Goodwood and fifth at York before running unplaced in the Northumberland Plate at Newcastle Racecourse and then coming home third in the stayers' race at the Shergar Cup meeting. He recorded his first success of the year in a minor event over fifteen furlongs at Newmarket on 24 August when he carried 138 pounds and won by three quarters of a length after taking the lead three furlongs out. After running third to Alcazar at Newmarket he started a 33/1 outsider for the Cesarewitch over two and a quarter miles at the same track on 20 October and produced his best performance up to that time as he carried 126 pounds and finished a close third behind Distant Prospect and Palua. At the next Newmarket two weeks later he won the two-mile Stubbs Stakes (a Listed handicap), going to the front approaching the final furlong and beating the three-year-old filly L'Evangile by half a length. For his final run of the year Give Notice was sent to France for the Listed Prix Denisy over 3100 metres at Saint-Cloud Racecourse on 23 November, but despite starting a strong favourite he was beaten into third behind Crillon and Le Nomade in a close finish.

=== 2002: five-year-old season ===
Give Notice began his fourth season with a considerable hike in class as he was entered in the Group 3 Sagaro Stakes over two miles at Ascot Racecourse on 1 May and was ridden for the first time by Frankie Dettori. The 2001 winner Solo Mio started favourite ahead of Double Honour, Persian Punch and Invermark (Prix du Cadran) with Give Notice the 8/1 fifth choice in an eight-runner field. After being restrained towards the rear, Give Notice began to make progress in the last half mile, and was switched left to race down the centre of the straight. He overtook the front-running Persian Punch inside the final furlong and drew away to win by three and a half lengths. John Dunlop commented "I think Frankie knew what he was doing there. Give Notice is a tough, improving horse. There aren't many races for him so I suppose we will have to look at coming back here for the Gold Cup."

At Royal Ascot in June Give Notice started at odds of 10/1 for the Group 1 Ascot Gold Cup and came home fifth behind Royal Rebel, Vinnie Roe, Wareed and Hatha Anna, beaten four lengths by the winner. In the Goodwood Cup on 1 August he finished second of the nine runners, beaten one and a half lengths by Jardines Lookout. The Lonsdale Cup at York in August saw Give Notice being outpaced in the closing stages and finishing fifth of seven behind Boreas. On 6 October the gelding was sent to France for the Group 1 Prix du Cadran over 4000 metres at Longchamp Racecourse in which he was ridden by Johnny Murtagh and started at odds of 6.2/1 in a fourteen-runner field. The Grand Prix de Deauville winner Polish Summer started favourite while the other runners included Persian Punch, Miraculous (Prix Gladiateur), Cut Quartz (Prix Kergorlay), Ice Dancer (Trigo Stakes), Pushkin (Prix Maurice de Nieuil), Bangalore (Northumberland Plate) and San Sebastian (winner of the race in 2000). Give Notice was not among the early leaders but turned into the straight in fifth place and made rapid progress approaching the last 200 metres. In a closely contested finish, which saw less than four lengths covering the first ten finishers, he won by a head from Pushkin, with Polish Summer, Cut Quartz, Clety, Persian Punch, Soreze, Terrazzo, Tiger Groom and Miraculous close behind. Dunlop said "Johnny said he would cuddle the horse round and challenge in the last two furlongs. I've never heard of "cuddling" a horse before but it worked".

Give Notice was later sent to race in Saudi Arabia but had little success, finishing second in a minor event over 2400 metres in November 2004.

== Pedigree ==
Pedigree of Give Notice (GB), bay gelding, 1997
Sire Warning (GB) 1985	Known Fact (USA); 1977	In Reality	Intentionally
Sire Warning (GB) 1985	Known Fact (USA); 1977	In Reality	My Dear Girl
Sire Warning (GB) 1985	Known Fact (USA); 1977	Tamerett	Tim Tam
Sire Warning (GB) 1985	Known Fact (USA); 1977	Tamerett	Mixed Marriage (GB)
Sire Warning (GB) 1985	Slightly Dangerous (USA); 1979	Roberto	Hail To Reason
Sire Warning (GB) 1985	Slightly Dangerous (USA); 1979	Roberto	Bramalea
Sire Warning (GB) 1985	Slightly Dangerous (USA); 1979	Where You Lead	Raise a Native
Sire Warning (GB) 1985	Slightly Dangerous (USA); 1979	Where You Lead	Noblesse (IRE)
Dam Princess Genista (GB) 1985	Ile de Bourbon (USA); 1975	Nijinsky (CAN)	Northern Dancer
Dam Princess Genista (GB) 1985	Ile de Bourbon (USA); 1975	Nijinsky (CAN)	Flaming Page
Dam Princess Genista (GB) 1985	Ile de Bourbon (USA); 1975	Roseliere (FR)	Misti
Dam Princess Genista (GB) 1985	Ile de Bourbon (USA); 1975	Roseliere (FR)	Peace Rose
Dam Princess Genista (GB) 1985	Queen of the Brush; 1977	Averof	Sing Sing
Dam Princess Genista (GB) 1985	Queen of the Brush; 1977	Averof	Argentina
Dam Princess Genista (GB) 1985	Queen of the Brush; 1977	Little Miss	Aggressor
Dam Princess Genista (GB) 1985	Queen of the Brush; 1977	Little Miss	Violetta (ITY) (Family: 3-c)
