= La Cucaracha (horse) =

British-bred Thoroughbred racehorse

- Sire: Piccolo
- Grandsire: Warning
- Dam: Peggy Spencer
- Damsire: Formidable
- Sex: Mare
- Foaled: 26 March 2001
- Country: United Kingdom
- Colour: Bay
- Breeder: Guy Reed
- Owner: Guy Reed
- Trainer: Barry Hills
- Record: 15: 7-3-1
- Earnings: £326,568

Major wins
- Cammidge Trophy (2005); Ballyogan Stakes (2005); Nunthorpe Stakes (2005); King George Stakes (2006)

La Cucaracha (26 March 2001 – 9 February 2014) was a British Thoroughbred racehorse and broodmare. Bred and owned by the Yorkshire businessman Guy Reed she was trained by Barry Hills at Lambourn. She was a specialist sprinter, who won both of her races as a juvenile but injury restricted her career to five races in two years until she emerged as a top class sprinter as a four-year-old. In 2005 she won four of her seven races including the Cammidge Trophy and Ballyogan Stakes before recording her biggest win in the Nunthorpe Stakes. La Cucaracha remained in training at five and recorded another major victory on her final racecourse appearance when she won the King George Stakes.

== Background ==
La Cucaracha is a bay mare with a faint white star and a white coronet markings on her hind feet bred at Copgrove Hall in North Yorkshire by her owner Guy Reed, a former RAF engineer who had made his fortune in the frozen chicken business. She was sired by the sprinter Piccolo and thus was a male-line descendant of the Godolphin Arabian, unlike more than 95% of modern thoroughbreds, who trace their ancestry to the Darley Arabian. Piccolo's biggest win came in 1994 when he was awarded the Nunthorpe Stakes on the disqualification of Blue Siren. He went on to have some success as a sire of sprint horses including Temple of Boom (The Galaxy), Flying Blue (Chairman's Trophy), Tiddliwinks (Duke of York Stakes) and Winker Watson (July Stakes). La Cucaracha's dam Peggy Spencer won three minor races for Reed from sixteen attempts between 1994 and 1996. She was descendant of the broodmare Be Careful, the ancestor of several other major winners including Agnes World and Dubai Destination.

The filly was sent into training with the veteran Barry Hills at Lambourn in Berkshire and was ridden in all but two of her races by the trainer's son Michael.

== Racing career ==
=== 2003: two-year-old season ===
La Cucaracha began her racing career in a five furlong maiden race at Leicester Racecourse on 26 April. Ridden by Tony Culhane, she took the lead at half way and went clear of her thirteen opponents to win by five lengths from the colt Fine Silver. Three weeks later the filly started 1/2 favourite for a minor stakes race at Newbury Racecourse and won "comfortably" by two and a half lengths from the Mick Channon-trained Ma'Soola. La Cucaracha was injured shortly afterwards and missed the rest of the season.

=== 2004: three-year-old season ===
Eleven months after her last start, La Cucaracha returned in the Listed Lansdown Fillies' Stakes race over five furlongs at Bath Racecourse on 27 April 2004 and recovered from interference in the last quarter mile to finish second, three-quarters of a length behind the five-year-old mare Ringmoor Down. In May she started 3/1 second favourite for the Carnarvon Stakes at Newbury but finished sixth after Hills was unable to obtain a clear run in the closing stages. Ten days later she finished third to the six-year-old gelding Celtic Mill in the Leisure Stakes at Windsor Racecourse before further injury problems kept her off the course for the remainder of the year. Barry Hills later explained that the filly had sustained a stress fracture which was successfully treated by the Newmarket vet Ian Wright.

=== 2005: four-year-old season ===
La Cucaracha returned from her second lengthy absence to contest the Listed Cammidge Trophy at Doncaster Racecourse on 2 April 2005 and started a 14/1 outsider in an eleven-runner field headed by the veteran handicapper Smokin Beau. After being restrained by Hills in the early stages, the filly took the lead a furlong out and recorded her first important win, beating the five-year-old gelding The Kiddykid by half a length. After the race Barry Hills said "I thought she needed this race. Hopefully, she will progress from this... She has a lot of speed and won't want more than six furlongs".

In the Duke of York Stakes five weeks later, the filly failed to reproduce her Doncaster form, finishing ninth of the eleven runners behind The Kiddykid. For her next race, La Cucaracha was sent to Ireland for the Group Three Ballyogan Stakes at Leopardstown Racecourse on 1 June and started 9/2 second favourite behind her fellow English raider Kind. After racing in fifth place, the filly took the lead approaching the final furlong and won by half a length and a head from Alexander Icequeen and Kind. Michael Hills commented" La Cucaracha is a good filly on fast ground like we had tonight. Things went against her in the race. She was drawn on the outside and had to race wide. She got on to the wrong lead on the final bend and that made it harder for her". La Cucaracha faced Kind again when she returned to England for the Summer Stakes at York on 8 July. After tracking the leaders, she took the lead approaching the final furlong but was overtaken in the closing stages and beaten three lengths by the Richard Hannon Sr.-trained Lucky Spin. Over the same course and distance two weeks later, the filly was assigned top weight of 136 pounds in the Skybet Dash Handicap and started 9/2 favourite despite carrying at least ten pounds more than any of her fourteen opponents. Hills sent the filly into the lead a furlong out and she kept on well to win by three quarters of a length from the eight-year-old gelding Connect.

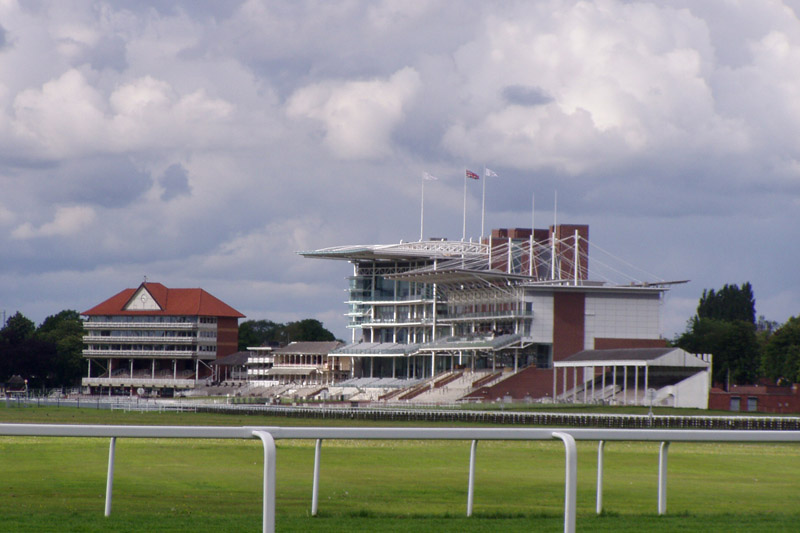
York Racecourse, where La Cucaracha won the Nunthorpe Stakes in 2005

After racing over six furlongs for most of her career, La Cucaracha was dropped back to five furlongs and stepped up to Group One class for the first time when she contested the Nunthorpe Stakes on firm ground at York on 18 August. The French challenger Chineur started favourite after winning the King's Stand Stakes at Royal Ascot ahead of Avonbridge with La Cucaracha next in the betting on 7/1 alongside The Tatling (winner of the King's Stand in 2004). The other runners included Balmont (Middle Park Stakes), Moss Vale (Sandy Lane Stakes), Benbaun, Fire Up The Band (King George Stakes), Boogie Street (Achilles Stakes), Majestic Missile (Molecomb Stakes, Cornwallis Stakes), Fayr Jag (Golden Jubilee Stakes), The Trader (Prix du Gros Chêne), Orientor (Chipchase Stakes) and Bahamian Pirate (winner of the race in the previous year). Hills restrained the filly in the early stages as Boogie Street set the pace, but then made forward move in the last quarter mile. La Cucaracha accelerated into the lead inside the final furlong and held off a strong late challenge from The Tatling to win by a head, with Majestic Missile taking third ahead of Boogie Street and Benbaun. After the race Michael Hills said "It's a good feeling. She quickened so well for me. But as soon as she got to the front she thought she'd done enough – she nearly gave me a heart attack. I felt I had enough horse to keep in front, but she was just pulling up when I got to the lead. She's improved and improved and she loves this surface. The race went perfect, the split came with just a furlong to run and I had loads of horse under me". Barry Hills commented "She's good and she will get better. She likes it quick, there's no doubt about that, and it helps stop some of the others when it's on the fast side". Guy Reed, who was winning his first Group One race in 37 years as an owner had backed the filly at 33/1: he commented "I backed her first show, and my bookmaker will have been watching this. He's a decent chap."

On her next appearance, La Cucaracha was moved back up to six furlongs for the William Hill Sprint Cup at Haydock Park in September. She finished second behind the three-year-old colt Goodricke with Somnus, Proclamation, Lucky Spin, The Kiddykid and the Stewards' Cup winner Gift Horse among the other beaten runners. The filly was expected to end her season in the Hong Kong Sprint in December but sustained an injury and was retired for the year.

=== 2006: five-year-old season ===
La Cucaracha made little impact on her first two appearances as a five-year-old. In June at Royal Ascot she started joint second favourite for the King's Stand Stakes but finished unplaced behind the Australian sprinter Takeover Target after racing along the unfavorable stands-side of the course. In the following month she had no obvious excuse when finishing eleventh of the fifteen runners behind Les Arcs in the July Cup. After two disappointing runs at Group One level, the mare was dropped in class for the Group Three King George Stakes at Goodwood Racecourse on 3 August. She was made the 7/2 favourite in a field which included The Tatling, Fayr Jag, Strike Up The Band and Majestic Missile as well as the Cheveley Park Stakes winner Donna Blini. After being held up towards the rear, La Cucaracha began to make progress approaching the final furlong, took the lead 75 yards from the finish and won by three quarters of a length from the six-year-old gelding Desert Lord.

In November 2006, she was auctioned at the Tattersalls December Mares Sale and was bought for 525,000 guineas by the bloodstock agent James Delahooke.

== Breeding record ==
After being sold at Newmarket in 2006, La Cucaracha was exported to become a broodmare for the New Jersey–based Colts Neck Stable in the United States. In 2011 she was offered for sale at Keeneland in November. She was bought for $530,000 by Katsumi Yoshida and exported to Japan. She died on 9 February 2014 a week after foaling her last foal. Her foals include:

- Yasmeena, a chestnut filly, foaled in 2008, sired by Mr Greeley. Won one race.
- Senora Dancer, chestnut filly, 2009, by Distorted Humor. Unraced.
- El Cumbanchero, bay colt, 2012, by Elusive Quality. Failed to win in seven races in Japan, as of August 2015
- Cielito Lindo, dark bay filly, 2014, by Stay Gold.

== Pedigree ==
Pedigree of La Cucaracha, bay mare, 2001
Sire Piccolo (GB) 1991	Warning (GB); 1985	Known Fact	In Reality
Sire Piccolo (GB) 1991	Warning (GB); 1985	Known Fact	Tamerett
Sire Piccolo (GB) 1991	Warning (GB); 1985	Slightly Dangerous	Roberto
Sire Piccolo (GB) 1991	Warning (GB); 1985	Slightly Dangerous	Where You Lead
Sire Piccolo (GB) 1991	Woodwind (FR); 1973	Whistling Wind	Whistler
Sire Piccolo (GB) 1991	Woodwind (FR); 1973	Whistling Wind	Good as Gold
Sire Piccolo (GB) 1991	Woodwind (FR); 1973	Garden Green	Pinturischio
Sire Piccolo (GB) 1991	Woodwind (FR); 1973	Garden Green	Focal
Dam Peggy Spencer (GB) 1992	Formidable (USA); 1975	Forli	Aristophanes
Dam Peggy Spencer (GB) 1992	Formidable (USA); 1975	Forli	Trevisa
Dam Peggy Spencer (GB) 1992	Formidable (USA); 1975	Native Partner	Raise a Native
Dam Peggy Spencer (GB) 1992	Formidable (USA); 1975	Native Partner	Dinner Partner
Dam Peggy Spencer (GB) 1992	Careful Dancer (GB); 1986	Gorytus	Nijinsky
Dam Peggy Spencer (GB) 1992	Careful Dancer (GB); 1986	Gorytus	Glad Rags
Dam Peggy Spencer (GB) 1992	Careful Dancer (GB); 1986	Be Noble	Vaguely Noble
Dam Peggy Spencer (GB) 1992	Careful Dancer (GB); 1986	Be Noble	Be Careful (Family: 6-b)
