= So Factual =

American-bred Thoroughbred racehorse

- Sire: Known Fact
- Grandsire: In Reality
- Dam: Sookera
- Damsire: Roberto
- Sex: Stallion
- Foaled: 4 March 1990
- Country: United States
- Colour: Bay
- Breeder: Juddmonte Farms
- Owner: Khalid Abdullah; Godolphin
- Trainer: Guy Harwood; Hilal Ibrahim; Saeed bin Suroor
- Record: 16: 7-5-1
- Earnings: £337,463

Major wins
- European Free Handicap (1993); Cork and Orrery Stakes (1995); Nunthorpe Stakes (1995)

So Factual (foaled 4 March 1990) was an American-bred Thoroughbred racehorse and sire. He was bred in Kentucky by Khalid Abdullah and sent to race in Europe where he proved to be one of the leading sprinters of his time. As a juvenile he ran three times, winning on his debut and finishing second in the Coventry Stakes. In the following year he won the European Free Handicap but was well beaten in his next two races and was then sold and sent to compete in the United Arab Emirates. In 1994 he won three races in Dubai and was then returned to Europe in the ownership of Godolphin Racing. He reached his peak as a five-year-old in 1995 when he recorded victories in the Cork and Orrery Stakes and the Nunthorpe Stakes. He was retired to stud at the end of the year.

== Background ==
So Factual was a bay horse with a white blaze and a white sock on his left foreleg bred in Kentucky by his owner Khalid Abdullah's Juddmonte Farms. He was sired by the 2000 Guineas and Queen Elizabeth II Stakes winner Known Fact and thus was a male-line descendant of the Godolphin Arabian, unlike more than 95% of modern thoroughbreds, who trace their ancestry to the Darley Arabian. Known Fact's other progeny included Warning and Markofdistinction. So Factual's dam Sookera was one of the best juvenile fillies of her generation in Britain, winning the Chesham Stakes and the Cheveley Park Stakes in 1977. As the dam of Kerali she was also the female-line ancestor of Leroidesanimaux and the outstanding broodmare Hasili.

So Factual was initially sent into training with Guy Harwood at Pulborough in West Sussex. He was ridden in his first two seasons by the veteran Irish jockey Pat Eddery.

== Racing career ==
=== 1992: two-year-old season ===
So Factual began his racing career in a maiden race over six furlongs at Folkestone Racecourse on 2 June 1992. Starting the 4/5 favourite against ten opponents, he took the lead a furlong out and won "comfortably" by three and a half lengths from Captain Le Saux. The colt was immediately moved up in class for the Group Three Coventry Stakes at Royal Ascot two weeks later. Starting the 11/2 fourth choice in the betting he finished strongly and finished second, beaten a short head by the Geoff Wragg-trained Petardia. On his only other appearance of the year he started 1/3 favourite for a minor event at Leicester Racecourse in October but was beaten five lengths into second by Young Ern.

=== 1993: three-year-old season ===
On his first appearance as a three-year-old, So Factual carried 132 pounds in the European Free Handicap over seven furlongs at Newmarket Racecourse on 14 April. He started at odds of 8/1 in a seven-runner field which also included Petardia (133 pounds) and the Sirenia Stakes winner Silver Wizard (132). After being restrained by Eddery in the early stages he took the lead approaching the final furlong and won by half a length from the Richard Hannon-trained Revelation (later to win the Prix Eugène Adam). The colt was brought back in distance for the Duke of York Stakes at York Racecourse in May for which he started 7/4 favourite but finished sixth of the ten runners behind Hamas. In June he started second favourite for the Criterion Stakes at Newmarket but made no impression and finished unplaced behind Inchinor.

=== 1994: four-year-old season ===
In 1994 So Factual raced in the colours of Saeed Manana and was sent to race on dirt in the United Arab Emirates where he was trained by Hilal Ibrahim. He was ridden in all of his races that year by Ray Cochrane. After finishing second in Abu Dhabi on his debut he won over five furlongs at Nad Al Sheba Racecourse on 3 February. Later that month he won a seven furlong handicap at the same track by eight lengths and followed up in a similar event two weeks later. On his return to European turf he entered the ownership of Sheikh Mohammed's Godolphin Racing. On 16 June he started at odds of 12/1 against sixteen opponents in the Cork and Orrery Stakes at Royal Ascot. After being held up by Cochrane he made good late progress and finished second, half a length behind the winner Owington.

=== 1995: five-year-old season ===
Saeed bin Suroor took over from Ibrahim as So Factual's trainer for the 1995 season. On his first appearance of the season he was ridden by Frankie Dettori in the Duke of York Stakes on 18 May and finished second, three lengths behind the four-year-old Lake Coniston.

At Royal Ascot on 22 June, So Factual faced Lake Coniston again in the Cork and Orrery Stakes and started the 9/2 second favourite in an eleven-runner field. The field split into two groups across the wide Ascot straight with Dettori tracking the leaders on the far side (the right hand side from the jockeys' viewpoint), whilst Lake Coniston led the group on the opposite side. He headed the far side group two furlongs out, overhauled Lake Coniston inside the final furlong and won by a head, with the pair finishing three lengths clear of the filly Nuriva in third. Cochrane took over the ride when So Factual and Lake Coniston met again in the July Cup at Newmarket three weeks later. On this occasion he never looked likely to win and finished seventh of the nine runners.

On 17 August, Dettori resumed his association with So Factual when the horse was one of eight runners to contest the Group One Nunthorpe Stakes over five furlongs at York. The three-year-old colt Mind Games (winner of the Norfolk Stakes, Palace House Stakes and Temple Stakes) started favourite ahead of the filly Hever Golf Rose, with So Factual next in the betting on 9/2. The other runners were Milltream (Cornwallis Stakes, Ballyogan Stakes), Millyant (Molecomb Stakes, Prix du Petit Couvert, Prix du Gros Chêne), Sharp Point, Ya Malak and Mistertopogigo (Scarbrough Stakes). Dettori settled the horse towards the rear of the field before as Hever Golf Rose set the pace from Mind Games as the horses raced up the stands side (the right hand side from the jockeys' viewpoint). Approaching the final furlong, Dettori switched the horse left and took the lead from Mind Games and Hever Golf Rose as Ya Malak began to make rapid progress along the stands-side rail. Despite hanging to the right in the closing stages, So Factual kept on well to win by one and a half lengths from Ya Malak, with Hever Golf Rose taking third ahead of Sharp Point.

So Factual bypassed the remainder of the European season before being sent to Japan to contest the Sprinters Stakes at Nakayama Racecourse on 17 December. Ridden by Olivier Peslier he raced in fifth place before making progress in the straight and finished third of the sixteen runners, beaten one and a quarter lengths and three quarters of a length by Hishi Akebono and Biko Pegasus.

== Stud record ==
So Factual was retired from racing to become a breeding stallion. The best of his offspring was Ialysos who won seven races in Greece before moving to Britain where he won the Achilles Stakes and the Coral Charge in 2009.

== Pedigree ==
Pedigree of So Factual (USA), bay stallion, 1990
| Sire Known Fact (USA) 1977 | In Reality (USA); 1964 | Intentionally | Intent |
| Sire Known Fact (USA) 1977 | In Reality (USA); 1964 | Intentionally | My Recipe |
| Sire Known Fact (USA) 1977 | In Reality (USA); 1964 | My Dear Girl | Rough'n Tumble |
| Sire Known Fact (USA) 1977 | In Reality (USA); 1964 | My Dear Girl | Iltis |
| Sire Known Fact (USA) 1977 | Tamerett (USA); 1962 | Tim Tam | Tom Fool |
| Sire Known Fact (USA) 1977 | Tamerett (USA); 1962 | Tim Tam | Two Lea |
| Sire Known Fact (USA) 1977 | Tamerett (USA); 1962 | Mixed Marriage | Tudor Minstrel |
| Sire Known Fact (USA) 1977 | Tamerett (USA); 1962 | Mixed Marriage | Persian Maid |
| Dam Sookera (USA) 1975 | Roberto (USA); 1969 | Hail To Reason | Turn-To |
| Dam Sookera (USA) 1975 | Roberto (USA); 1969 | Hail To Reason | Nothirdchance |
| Dam Sookera (USA) 1975 | Roberto (USA); 1969 | Bramalea | Nashua |
| Dam Sookera (USA) 1975 | Roberto (USA); 1969 | Bramalea | Rarelea |
| Dam Sookera (USA) 1975 | Irule (USA); 1968 | Young Emperor | Grey Sovereign |
| Dam Sookera (USA) 1975 | Irule (USA); 1968 | Young Emperor | Young Empress |
| Dam Sookera (USA) 1975 | Irule (USA); 1968 | Iaround | Round Table |
| Dam Sookera (USA) 1975 | Irule (USA); 1968 | Iaround | Itsabet (Family: 11) |
