= Markofdistinction =

British-bred Thoroughbred racehorse

- Sire: Known Fact
- Grandsire: In Reality
- Dam: Ghislaine
- Damsire: Icecapade
- Sex: Stallion
- Foaled: 14 April 1986
- Country: United Kingdom
- Colour: Dark bay or brown
- Breeder: Gerald Leigh
- Owner: Gerald Leigh
- Trainer: Luca Cumani
- Record: 12: 5-1-2
- Earnings: £380,634

Major wins
- Silver Trophy (1989); Sandown Mile (1990); Queen Anne Stakes (1990); Queen Elizabeth II Stakes (1990)

Markofdistinction (14 April 1986 – 1996) was a British Thoroughbred racehorse. He showed promise as a two-year-old in 1988, when he was an emphatic winner of his only start. In the following year his only win came in the Listed Silver Trophy although he ran well in several major races including the 2000 Guineas and the Sussex Stakes. He reached his peak as a four-year-old in 1990, when he won the Sandown Mile, Queen Anne Stakes and Queen Elizabeth II Stakes. After his retirement from racing, he had modest success as a breeding stallion in Japan.

== Background ==
Markofdistinction was a dark bay or brown horse with a white star bred by Gerald Leigh who operated a small but successful breeding operation at his Eydon Hall Farm in Northamptonshire. During his racing career he was owned by Leigh and trained by Luca Cumani at Newmarket, Suffolk. Leigh initially wanted to name the colt Mark of Distinction, but was forced to modify his proposal as the name exceeded the 18-character limit, which counts spaces as characters.

He was sired by the 2000 Guineas and Queen Elizabeth II Stakes winner Known Fact and thus was a male-line descendant of the Godolphin Arabian, unlike more than 95% of modern thoroughbreds, who trace their ancestry to the Darley Arabian. Known Fact's other progeny included Warning and So Factual. Markofdistinction's dam Ghislaine was an American-bred mare who won her debut race in England by seven lengths but was unplaced on her only subsequent start. She was a granddaughter of the French broodmare Cambrienne whose other descendants included Dancing Rain, Dr Devious, Maybe and Saxon Warrior.

== Racing career ==
=== 1988: two-year-old season ===
Markofdistinction made his racecourse debut in a maiden race over six furlong at Newmarket Racecourse on 28 October and stated the 10/11 favourite. Ridden by Ray Cochrane he took the lead a furlong out and drew away to win by three lengths from Shalfleet with the filly Braiswick (later to win the E. P. Taylor Stakes) in third.

=== 1989: three-year-old season ===
On his first run as a three-year-old, Markofdistinction was moved up to the highest level to contest the 2000 Guineas over the Rowley Mile at Newmarket on 6 May. Starting at 14/1 he came home fourth behind Nashwan, Exbourne and Danehill, beaten less than two lengths by the winner. After a break of more than two months the colt returned in the Listed Silver Trophy over 7 1/2 furlongs at Lingfield Park Racecourse on 15 July in which he was partnered by Frankie Dettori by six length at odds of 1/4.

Eleven days after his win at Lingfield, Markofdistinction stepped back up to Group 1 class for the Sussex Stakes at Goodwood and finished third to Zilzal and Green Line Express with Opening Verse, Warning and Shaadi among the unplaced runners. Markofdistinction started odds-on favourite for his two other races that year but was beaten on both occasions. He finished second to Gold Seam in the Park Stakes at Doncaster in September and third behind Kerita and Mirror Black in the Supreme Stakes at Goodwood a month later.

=== 1990: four-year-old season ===
Dettori rode Markofdistinction in all six of his races as a four-year-old in 1990. He began his campaign in the Group 2 Trusthouse Forte Mile at Sandown Park on 27 April and started the 9/2 third choice in the betting behind Citidancer and Magic Gleam (Child Stakes). After being restrained towards the rear of the seven-runner field, he took the lead inside the final furlong and won by two lengths from Citidancer.

In May, the colt started 6/4 favourite for the Lockinge Stakes at Newbury Racecourse but came home fourth of the six runners behind Safawan, Distant Relative and Monsagem. At Royal Ascot on 19 June he went off at odds of 7/1 for the Queen Anne Stakes over the straight mile course. Safawan started favourite, while the other seven runners included Distant Relative, Monsagem, Magic Gleam and Mirror Black. Markofdistinction was held up by Dettori before accelerating in the last quarter mile and overtook the leader Mirror Black inside the final furlong to win by a neck with a gap of five lengths back to Distant Relative in third.

In July, Markofdistinction was sent to the United States to contest the Caesars International over 9 1/2 furlongs at Atlantic City Race Course and finished fourth behind Steinlen. The Queen Elizabeth II Stakes over the round mile course at Ascot on 29 September attracted a ten-runner field and saw Tirol start favourite ahead of Shavian, Distant Relative and Linamix (Poule d'Essai des Poulains) with Markofdistinction next in the betting on 6/1. The other five runners were Green Line Express, Citidancer, Candy Glen (Premio Parioli), Call To Arms and Croupier. Markofdistinction raced towards the rear of the field as Shavian set the pace but made steady progress approaching the final turn and was switched left by Dettori to make his challenge on the outside in the straight. The closing stages of the race saw a sustained struggle between Markofdistinction and Distant Relative with the former gaining the advantage in the final strides to win by a length with the pair drawing eight lengths clear of Green Line Express in third.

For his final race, Markofdistinction was sent to America for a second time to run in the Breeders' Cup Mile at Belmont Park on 27 October. He briefly took third place in the straight but was outpaced in the final furlong and finished seventh behind Royal Academy.

== Stud record ==
At the end of his racing career, Markofdistinction was exported to Japan to become a breeding stallion. He sired the winners of 476 races with the best of his offspring being Hokkai Rousseau who won the Grade II Sankei Sho and finished third in both the Kikuka Sho and the Tenno Sho. His other progeny included the Grade III winners Koei Roman and Magic Ribbon.

== Pedigree ==
Pedigree of Markofdistinction (GB), dark bay or brown stallion, 1986
Sire Known Fact (USA) 1977	In Reality; 1964	Intentionally	Intent
Sire Known Fact (USA) 1977	In Reality; 1964	Intentionally	My Recipe
Sire Known Fact (USA) 1977	In Reality; 1964	My Dear Girl	Rough'n Tumble
Sire Known Fact (USA) 1977	In Reality; 1964	My Dear Girl	Iltis
Sire Known Fact (USA) 1977	Tamerett; 1962	Tim Tam	Tom Fool
Sire Known Fact (USA) 1977	Tamerett; 1962	Tim Tam	Two Lea
Sire Known Fact (USA) 1977	Tamerett; 1962	Mixed Marriage (GB)	Tudor Minstrel
Sire Known Fact (USA) 1977	Tamerett; 1962	Mixed Marriage (GB)	Persian Maid
Dam Ghislaine (USA) 1981	Icecapade; 1969	Nearctic (CAN)	Nearco (ITY)
Dam Ghislaine (USA) 1981	Icecapade; 1969	Nearctic (CAN)	Lady Angela (GB)
Dam Ghislaine (USA) 1981	Icecapade; 1969	Shenanigans	Native Dancer
Dam Ghislaine (USA) 1981	Icecapade; 1969	Shenanigans	Bold Irish
Dam Ghislaine (USA) 1981	Cambretta; 1975	Roberto	Hail to Reason
Dam Ghislaine (USA) 1981	Cambretta; 1975	Roberto	Bramalea
Dam Ghislaine (USA) 1981	Cambretta; 1975	Cambrienne (FR)	Sicambre
Dam Ghislaine (USA) 1981	Cambretta; 1975	Cambrienne (FR)	Torbella (Family: 1-t)
