= Intentionally (horse) =

American-bred Thoroughbred racehorse

- Sire: Intent
- Grandsire: War Relic
- Dam: My Recipe
- Damsire: Discovery
- Sex: Stallion
- Foaled: 1956
- Country: United States
- Colour: Black
- Breeder: Brookfield Farm
- Owner: Brookfield Farm; Tartan Stable
- Trainer: Edward I. Kelly, Sr. John A. Nerud
- Rider: Bill Hartack
- Record: 34: 18-7-2
- Earnings: US$652,259

Major wins
- Futurity Stakes (1958); Pimlico Futurity (1958); Tyro Stakes (1958); Withers Stakes (1959); Warren Wright Memorial Stakes (1959); Jerome Handicap (1959); Delaware Valley Handicap (1959); Toboggan Handicap (1960); Equipoise Mile Handicap (1960); Sport Page Handicap (1961); Quaker City Handicap (1961); Palm Beach Handicap (1962); Seminole Handicap (1962)

Awards
- American Champion Sprint Horse (1959)

Intentionally (April 2, 1956 – January 15, 1970) was an American Champion Thoroughbred racehorse and an important foundation sire for the Florida horse breeding industry.

== Background ==
Foaled at Wolf Run Farm in Lexington, Kentucky, he was bred and raced by Baltimore, Maryland clothing manufacturer Harry Isaacs' Brookfield Farm. His sire, Intent, won back-to-back runnings of the San Juan Capistrano Handicap. Grandsire, War Relic, was a son of the U.S. Racing Hall of Fame inductee, Man o' War. His dam was My Recipe, a daughter of another Hall of Fame inductee, Discovery. Intentionally was conditioned for racing by Brookfield Farm's long-time trainer, Eddie Kelly.

== Racing career ==
At age two in 1958, Intentionally won two of the most important East Coast races for juveniles. First, under jockey Bill Shoemaker, he won the Futurity Stakes at New York's Aqueduct Racetrack in near track-record time, defeating Christopher Chenery's previously undefeated colt First Landing. Then, in November, he won the Pimlico Futurity at Baltimore's Pimlico Race Course. In the Champagne Stakes, he ran second to First Landing, who at year's end was voted American Champion Two-Year-Old Colt and given top weight of 128 pounds in Frank E. Kilroe's Experimental Free Handicap weights.

At age three, Intentionally developed into the top Sprint horse in North America. In early April, he won his first start at Jamaica Race Course by 6½ lengths, then ran fourth to longshot winner Manassa Mauler in the Wood Memorial Stakes.. Following this loss, Intentionally's handlers withdrew him from the U.S. Triple Crown series. The colt went on to win important races in 1959 such as the Withers Stakes and the Jerome Handicap. In winning the Warren Wright Memorial Stakes at Chicago's Washington Park Race Track, he set a track record and equaled the world record for 8 furlongs with a time of 1:33.20. He was voted 1959 American Champion Sprint Horse.

A leg ailment resulted in Intentionally not starting his 1960 four-year-old campaign until June 29. He then won the Toboggan Handicap and Equipoise Mile Handicap.

Owner Harry Isaacs raced Intentionally at age five, but in the fall of 1961 he was sold to William L. McKnight of Tartan Farms near Ocala, Florida. The horse's training was turned over to John Nerud. Intentionally raced at age six, notably beating Carry Back in the 1962 Palm Beach and Seminole Handicaps before being retired to stand at stud at McKnight's Tartan Farms.

== Stud career ==
Intentionally became a stallion of considerable import in the development of the Florida breeding industry. Among his offspring, he sired:

- In Reality (b. 1964) - wins include the Pimlico Futurity, Florida Derby, Carter Handicap, Metropolitan Handicap. Outstanding sire of three champions and a good sire of sires.
- Ta Wee (b. 1966) - Hall of Fame filly, American Champion Sprint Horse (1969, 1970)
- Tentam (b. 1969) - wins included the United Nations and Metropolitan Handicaps
- Group Plan (b. 1970) - won Jockey Club Gold Cup, Hawthorne Gold Cup, Stymie Handicap

Intentionally died of a heart attack in 1970 at Tartan Farms and is buried there in the portion that is now Winding Oaks Farm.

== Sire line tree ==
- Intentionally
  - In Reality
    - Valid Appeal
      - Proud Appeal
      - Mighty Appealing
      - Southern Appeal
      - Kipper Kelly
        - Kelly Kip
      - Mister Jolie
      - Valid Wager
      - Seacliff
      - Valid Expectations
        - The Daddy
      - K J's Appeal
      - Successful Appeal
        - Closing Argument
        - J P's Gusto
    - Believe It
      - Believe The Queen
      - Garthorn
      - Al Mamoon
    - Classic Trial
    - Relaunch
      - Launch a Pegasus
      - Skywalker
        - Bertrando
        - Al Skywalker
        - Sky Terrace
      - Waquoit
        - Wicapi
        - Crosspatch
        - Buck Trout
        - Docent
      - Cees Tizzy
        - Tiznow
        - Cost of Freedom
      - Honour and Glory
        - Put It Back
        - Blues and Royals
        - Codigo de Honor
        - Cuestion de Honor
        - Honour Devil
        - Indio Glorioso
        - Mach Glory
      - With Anticipation
    - Known Fact
      - Warning
        - Averti
        - Piccolo
        - Annus Mirabillis
        - Bishop of Cashel
        - Charnwood Forest
        - Decorated Hero
        - Diktat
        - Little Rock
        - Danger Over
        - Give Notice
        - Calstone Light O
      - Markofdistinction
        - Hokkai Rousseau
      - So Factual
        - Ialysos
      - Bold Fact
    - Court Trial
    - Star Choice
    - Sunshine Today
    - Smile
      - Smiling Time
    - Proper Reality
  - Tentam
    - Great Neck
    - A Phenomenon
    - Diapason
    - New Connection
    - Ten Gold Pots
  - Group Plan

== Pedigree ==
Pedigree of Intentionally, black stallion, foaled April 2, 1956
Sire Intent chestnut 1948	War Relic ch. 1938	Man o' War ch. 1917	Fair Play*
Sire Intent chestnut 1948	War Relic ch. 1938	Man o' War ch. 1917	Mahubah
Sire Intent chestnut 1948	War Relic ch. 1938	Friar's Carse ch. 1923	Friar Rock
Sire Intent chestnut 1948	War Relic ch. 1938	Friar's Carse ch. 1923	Problem
Sire Intent chestnut 1948	Liz F. ch. 1933	Bubbling Over ch. 1923	North Star III
Sire Intent chestnut 1948	Liz F. ch. 1933	Bubbling Over ch. 1923	Beaming Beauty
Sire Intent chestnut 1948	Liz F. ch. 1933	Weno blk. 1922	Whisk Broom II
Sire Intent chestnut 1948	Liz F. ch. 1933	Weno blk. 1922	Rosie O'Grady
Dam My Recipe bay 1947	Discovery ch. 1931	Display b. 1923	Fair Play*
Dam My Recipe bay 1947	Discovery ch. 1931	Display b. 1923	Cicuta
Dam My Recipe bay 1947	Discovery ch. 1931	Ariadne br. 1926	Light Brigade
Dam My Recipe bay 1947	Discovery ch. 1931	Ariadne br. 1926	Adrienne
Dam My Recipe bay 1947	Perlette dkb/br. 1934	Percentage ch. 1923	Midway
Dam My Recipe bay 1947	Perlette dkb/br. 1934	Percentage ch. 1923	Gossip Avenue
Dam My Recipe bay 1947	Perlette dkb/br. 1934	Escarpolette b. 1917	Fitz Herbert
Dam My Recipe bay 1947	Perlette dkb/br. 1934	Escarpolette b. 1917	Balancoire II (Family 5-j)

* Intentionally is inbred 4S × 4D to the stallion Fair Play, meaning that he appears fourth generation on the sire side of his pedigree and fourth generation on the dam side of his pedigree.
