= War Relic =

American-bred Thoroughbred racehorse

- Sire: Man o' War
- Grandsire: Fair Play
- Dam: Friar's Carse
- Damsire: Friar Rock
- Sex: Stallion
- Foaled: 1938
- Country: United States
- Colour: Chestnut
- Breeder: Samuel D. Riddle
- Owner: Glen Riddle Farm
- Trainer: George Conway; Walter A. Carter
- Record: 20: 9-4-2
- Earnings: $89,495

Major wins
- Governor's Handicap (1941); Kenner Stakes (1941); Massachusetts Handicap (1941); Narragansett Special (1941)
- Last updated on March 23, 2011

War Relic (1938–1963) was an American Thoroughbred racehorse.

== Background ==
A homebred of Samuel D. Riddle, his sire was Man o' War who was ranked #1 in the Blood-Horse magazine List of the Top 100 U.S. Racehorses of the 20th Century. His dam was Friar's Carse, the United States' Champion Two-Year-Old Filly of 1925 who was the daughter of Friar Rock, the 1916 Belmont Stakes winner and Horse of the Year. After trainer George Conway's death on June 20, 1939, War Relic's race conditioning was taken over by Walter A. Carter.

== Racing career ==
In 1941, the three-year-old War Relic won several top races, including the Massachusetts Handicap, and ran second by a nose to U.S. Triple Crown champion Whirlaway in the 1941 Saranac Handicap but defeated him in that year's Narragansett Special.

== Stud record ==
According to the National Sporting Library's Thoroughbred Heritage website, War Relic was the most successful sire of any of Man o' War's sons. Among War Relic's progeny was Battlefield who earned U.S. Champion Two-Year-Old Colt honors in 1950. Intent was another successful son of War Relic both on the racetrack and at stud.

War Relic's line continues today in modern thoroughbred champions like Tiznow, Colonel John, Well Armed and Bertrando, providing a direct sire-line back to Man o' War.

War Relic died at age twenty-five in 1963 and was buried at his owner's Faraway Farm near Lexington, Kentucky. However, War Relic's remains along with those of War Admiral and Man o' War were eventually moved to a place of honor at the Kentucky Horse Park.

== Sire line tree ==
- War Relic
  - Relic
    - Buisson Ardent
      - Roan Rocket
        - Tudor Rocket
    - El Relicario
      - UN Prince
        - Flambeau C
    - Polic
      - Polyfoto
    - Mystic II
      - Babamist
        - Heyday
        - Snowy River
      - Bewley's Hill
      - Freeman's Hill
    - Olden Times
      - Roving Boy
    - Pericles
    - Pieces of Eight
      - Stateff
  - Battlefield
  - Intent
    - Intentionally
      - In Reality
        - Valid Appeal
        - Believe It
        - Classic Trial
        - Relaunch
        - Known Fact
        - Court Trial
        - Star Choice
        - Sunshine Today
        - Smile
        - Proper Reality
      - Tentam
        - Great Neck
        - A Phenomenon
        - Diapason
        - New Connection
        - Ten Gold Pots
      - Group Plan
  - Missle
