= Munster Oaks =

Flat horse race in Ireland

- Class: Group 3
- Location: Cork Racecourse; County Cork, Ireland
- Inaugurated: 2003
- Race type: Flat / Thoroughbred
- Website: Cork

Race information
- Distance: 1m 4f (2,414 metres)
- Surface: Turf
- Track: Right-handed
- Qualification: Three-years-old and up fillies and mares
- Weight: 8 st 10 lb (3yo); 9 st 11 lb (4yo+); Penalties; 5 lb for G1 / G2 winners * 3 lb for G3 winners * * since 1 July last year
- Purse: €50,000 (2021); 1st: €29,500

Munster Oaks
2026
| Sparan Nua | Nyra | Bosphorus Rose |

Previous years
2025
Magical Hope | Lemsairbat | Enfranchise
2024
Sumiha | Trevaunance | Scarlett O'Hara
2023
Rosscarbery | Azazat | Thunder Roll
2022
Rosscarbery | Yaxeni | Lily Pond
2021
Thunder Kiss | Silence Please | High Heels

2020-2011
2020
Snow | Snapraeceps | Loveisthehigherlaw
2019
Who's Steph | Peach Tree | Moteo
2018
Flattering | Bloomfield | Sizzling
2017
Santa Monica | Butterflies | Glamorous Approach
2016
Pretty Perfect | Shamreen | Best In The World
2015
Words | Carla Bianca | Roheryn
2014
Venus de Milo | Dazzling | Circling
2013
Midnight Soprano | Magical Dream | Cubanita
2012
Sapphire | Betterbetterbetter | Soon
2011
Banimpire | Sense Of Purpose | Amazing Beauty

2010-2003
2010
Grace O'Malley | Karasiyra | Unity
2009
Grace O'malley | Tanoura | Jakarta Jazz
2008
Ice Queen | Profound Beauty | Beach Bunny
2007
Nick's Nikita | Athenian Way | Wannabe Posh
2006
Sina Cova | Kushnarenkovo | Allexina
2005
Right Key | Unique Pose | Saintly Rachel
2004
Danelissima | Summitville | Tarakala
2003
Snippets | Juliette | Elasouna

The Munster Oaks is a Group 3 flat horse race in Ireland open to thoroughbred fillies and mares aged three years or older. It is run at Cork over a distance of 1 mile and 4 furlongs (2,414 metres), and it is scheduled to take place each year in June.

== History ==
The race was established in 2003 at Naas and was titled the Noblesse Stakes after Noblesse, a successful Irish-trained filly whose victories included The Oaks in 1963. It was originally classed at Listed level, and the first running was restricted to three-year-olds.

The Noblesse Stakes was promoted to Group 3 status and opened to older fillies and mares in 2004. It was transferred to Cork in 2005 and renamed the Munster Oaks in 2014. The title Noblesse Stakes is now given to a similar race run at Cork in April.

== Records ==
Most successful horse (2 wins):

- Grace O'Malley – 2009, 2010
- Rosscarbery - 2022, 2023

Leading jockey (3 wins):

- Kevin Manning – Snippets (2003), Danelissima (2004), Banimpire (2011)
- Pat Smullen – Grace O'Malley (2009, 2010), Sapphire (2012)
- Billy Lee - Santa Monica (2017), Rosscarbery (2022, 2023)

Leading trainer (6 wins):

- Aidan O'Brien - Ice Queen (2008), Venus De Milo (2014), Words (2015), Pretty Perfect (2016), Flattering (2018), Snow (2020)

== Winners ==
| Year | Winner | Age | Jockey | Trainer | Time |
|---|---|---|---|---|---|
| 2003 | Snippets | 3 | Kevin Manning | Jim Bolger | 2:31.20 |
| 2004 | Danelissima | 3 | Kevin Manning | Jim Bolger | 2:30.40 |
| 2005 | Right Key | 3 | Declan McDonogh | Kevin Prendergast | 2:35.80 |
| 2006 | Sina Cova | 4 | Johnny Murtagh | Peter Casey | 2:32.70 |
| 2007 | Nick's Nikita | 4 | Rory Cleary | Michael Halford | 2:29.60 |
| 2008 | Ice Queen | 3 | Colm O'Donoghue | Aidan O'Brien | 2:35.29 |
| 2009 | Grace O'Malley | 3 | Pat Smullen | Dermot Weld | 2:29.97 |
| 2010 | Grace O'Malley | 4 | Pat Smullen | Dermot Weld | 2:35.70 |
| 2011 | Banimpire | 3 | Kevin Manning | Jim Bolger | 2:37.80 |
| 2012 | Sapphire | 4 | Pat Smullen | Dermot Weld | 2:35.90 |
| 2013 | Midnight Soprano | 6 | Marc Monaghan | Paul Deegan | 2:40.81 |
| 2014 | Venus De Milo | 4 | Joseph O'Brien | Aidan O'Brien | 2:32.75 |
| 2015 | Words | 3 | Seamie Heffernan | Aidan O'Brien | 2:39.82 |
| 2016 | Pretty Perfect | 3 | Colm O'Donoghue | Aidan O'Brien | 2:36.09 |
| 2017 | Santa Monica | 4 | Billy Lee | Charles O'Brien | 2:33.83 |
| 2018 | Flattering | 3 | Seamie Heffernan | Aidan O'Brien | 2:33.83 |
| 2019 | Who's Steph | 4 | Colin Keane | Ger Lyons | 2:38.50 |
| 2020 | Snow (Note: The 2020 race was run in July due to the COVID-19 pandemic in the Republic of Ireland) | 3 | Wayne Lordan | Aidan O'Brien | 2:36.41 |
| 2021 | Thunder Kiss | 4 | Colin Keane | Ger Lyons | 2:39.96 |
| 2022 | Rosscarbery | 4 | Billy Lee | Paddy Twomey | 2:36.95 |
| 2023 | Rosscarbery | 5 | Billy Lee | Paddy Twomey | 2:37.31 |
| 2024 | Sumiha | 4 | Chris Hayes | Dermot Weld | 2:33.57 |
| 2025 | Magical Hope | 4 | Colin Keane | Paddy Twomey | 2:36.29 |
| 2026 | Sparan Nua | 3 | Nathan Crosse | Jim Bolger | 2:36.07 |

== See also ==
- Horse racing in Ireland
- List of Irish flat horse races
