= Relaunch (horse) =

American-bred Thoroughbred racehorse

- Sire: In Reality
- Grandsire: Intentionally
- Dam: Foggy Note
- Damsire: The Axe
- Sex: Stallion
- Foaled: March 16, 1976
- Died: November 5, 1996 (aged 20)
- Country: United States
- Colour: Gray
- Breeder: Three Chimneys Farm & Taylor Made Farms
- Owner: Glen Hill Farm
- Trainer: John H. Adams
- Record: 18: 5-5-4
- Earnings: US$278,100

Major wins
- Del Mar Derby (1979); La Jolla Handicap (1979)

Relaunch (March 16, 1976 – November 5, 1996) was an American Thoroughbred racehorse and sire.

== Background ==
Relaunch was a gray horse bred in Kentucky by Three Chimneys Farm & Taylor Made Farms. During his racing career he was owned by Glen Hill Farm and trained by John H. Adams.

== Racing career ==
Relaunch won five of his eighteen starts, including the Del Mar Derby and the La Jolla Handicap in 1979.

== Stud record ==
Relaunch is best remembered as a sire at Wimbledon Farm in Lexington, Kentucky.

Relaunch was the sire of:

- Launch a Pegasus (b. 1982) - won Grade I Widener Handicap
- Skywalker (b. 1982) - won Santa Anita Derby (1985), Breeders' Cup Classic (1986). Career earnings of US$2,226,750
- Waquoit (b. 1983) - multiple Grade I winner who retired with earnings of US$2,225,360
- One Dreamer (b. 1988) - won 1994 Breeders' Cup Distaff
- Honour and Glory (b. 1993) - millionaire multiple stakes winner
- With Anticipation (b. 1995) - won United Nations Handicap (2001), Man o' War Handicap (2001, 2002), Sword Dancer Invitational Handicap (2001, 2002). Career earnings: US$2,660,543

Relaunch was also the grandsire of Hall of Fame inductee Tiznow and damsire of Ghostzapper, the 2004 World's Top Ranked Horse, as well as the damsire of Real Shadai, the 1993 Leading sire in Japan.

Relaunch died on November 5, 1996, of colic.

== Sire line tree ==
- Relaunch
  - Launch a Pegasus
  - Skywalker
    - Bertrando
      - Stormy Jack
      - Officer
        - Elite Squadron
        - Boys at Tosconova
      - Bilo
      - Unfurl the Flag
      - Karelian
      - Liberian Freighter
      - Sierra Sunset
      - Coach Bob
      - Tamerando
    - Al Skywalker
    - Sky Terrace
  - Waquoit
    - Wicapi
    - Crosspatch
    - Buck Trout
    - Docent
  - Cees Tizzy
    - Tiznow
      - Well Armed
      - Bullsbay
        - Bullheaded Boy
      - Informed
      - Tiz Wonderful
        - S'Maverlous
        - In Trouble
        - Big Trouble
        - Hunter O'Rily
        - Uncontested
        - Wonderful Evil
      - Colonel John
        - Here's Johnny
        - Airoforce
        - Cocked and Loaded
        - Dalmore
        - Little Nick V
      - Da' Tara
        - Switch Hitter
      - Tizdejavu
      - Tizway
        - Bearsway
        - Our Way
        - Backyard Heaven
        - Prados Way
        - The Critical Way
        - Tiz a Melody
        - Ezmosh
        - Jjang Kong
        - Arts Man
        - Festival Fever
      - Mr Hot Stuff
      - Morning Line
      - Gemologist
        - Theory
        - Embalogist
      - Fury Kapcori
      - Norumbega
      - Dynamic Impact
      - Strong Mandate
      - Tourist
        - Carpenters Call
        - Tango Tango Tango
        - Mo Tourist
      - Tiz Shea D
        - Capador
        - Reflexio
      - Igor
      - Irap
      - Tiz a Slam
      - Sporting Chance
      - Dennis Moment
      - Midnight Bourbon
    - Cost of Freedom
  - Honour and Glory
    - Put It Back
      - Black Bar Spin
      - In Summation
        - Calculator
      - Put Back the Shu
      - Smokey Stover
      - Nitido
      - Pirate Saint
      - Skypilot
      - Sol de Angra
      - Bal a Bali
        - Corner Office
        - Goa Gajah
      - Desjado Put
      - English Major
      - Noholdingback Bear
      - Fitzgerald
      - Flight Time
      - Garbo Talks
      - Glory Boy
      - Pimpers Paradise
    - Blues and Royals
    - Codigo de Honor
    - Cuestion de Honor
    - Honour Devil
    - Indio Glorioso
    - Mach Glory
  - With Anticipation

== Pedigree ==
Pedigree of Relaunch, gray stallion, foaled March 16, 1976
Sire In Reality bay 1964	Intentionally blk. 1956	Intent ch. 1948	War Relic*
Sire In Reality bay 1964	Intentionally blk. 1956	Intent ch. 1948	Liz F.
Sire In Reality bay 1964	Intentionally blk. 1956	My Recipe b. 1947	Discovery
Sire In Reality bay 1964	Intentionally blk. 1956	My Recipe b. 1947	Perlette
Sire In Reality bay 1964	My Dear Girl ch. 1957	Rough'n Tumble b. 1948	Free For All
Sire In Reality bay 1964	My Dear Girl ch. 1957	Rough'n Tumble b. 1948	Roused
Sire In Reality bay 1964	My Dear Girl ch. 1957	Iltis b. 1947	War Relic*
Sire In Reality bay 1964	My Dear Girl ch. 1957	Iltis b. 1947	We Hail
Dam Foggy Note gray 1965	The Axe II gr. 1958	Mahmoud gr. 1933	Blenheim II
Dam Foggy Note gray 1965	The Axe II gr. 1958	Mahmoud gr. 1933	Mah Mahal
Dam Foggy Note gray 1965	The Axe II gr. 1958	Blackball dkb/br. 1950	Shut Out
Dam Foggy Note gray 1965	The Axe II gr. 1958	Blackball dkb/br. 1950	Big Event
Dam Foggy Note gray 1965	Silver Song gr. 1957	Royal Note b. 1952	Spy Song
Dam Foggy Note gray 1965	Silver Song gr. 1957	Royal Note b. 1952	Penroyal
Dam Foggy Note gray 1965	Silver Song gr. 1957	Beadah gr. 1953	Djeddah
Dam Foggy Note gray 1965	Silver Song gr. 1957	Beadah gr. 1953	Beauty Spot (Family 3-o)

* Relaunch is inbred 4S × 4S to the stallion War Relic, meaning that he appears twice fourth generation on the sire side of his pedigree.
