= In Reality =

American-bred Thoroughbred racehorse

- Sire: Intentionally
- Grandsire: Intent
- Dam: My Dear Girl
- Damsire: Rough'n Tumble
- Sex: Stallion
- Foaled: March 1, 1964
- Died: May 8, 1989 (aged 25)
- Country: United States
- Colour: Bay
- Breeder: Frances A. Genter
- Owner: Frances A. Genter
- Trainer: Melvin Calvert
- Record: 27: 14-9-2
- Earnings: US$795,824

Major wins
- Pimlico Futurity (1966); Fountain of Youth Stakes (1967); Florida Derby (1967); Jersey Derby (1967); Rumson handicap (1967); Hibiscus Stakes (1967); Choice Stakes (1967); Carter Handicap (1968); John B. Campbell Handicap (1968); Metropolitan Handicap (1968) American Classic Race placing: Preakness Stakes 2nd (1967)

Honours
- In Reality Stakes at Calder Race Course
- Last updated on 8/9/2017

In Reality (March 1, 1964 – May 8, 1989) was an American bred racehorse. Bred in Florida, he was a son of Intentionally and out of the mare My Dear Girl, the 1959 American Champion Two-Year-Old Filly. His damsire was Santa Anita Derby winner Rough'n Tumble, who sired U.S. Racing Hall of Fame inductee Dr. Fager. In Reality is best remembered for his win in the Florida Derby and his runner-up performance in the Preakness Stakes to Eclipse Award Champion and millionaire Damascus.

== Race career ==
In Reality started his stakes career with a second-place finish in the Cowdin Stakes to the young Dr. Fager and then ran second in the Sapling Stakes. He finished his two-year-old season with a run in the Pimlico Futurity, beating out that year's champion two-year-old, Successor, for the win.

In his three-year-old season, In Reality started the year with a win in the Hibiscus Stakes. In Reality then finished second in the Florida Breeders' Stakes and the Flamingo Stakes before he won the Fountain of Youth and the Florida Derby. He then moved on to the Preakness, where he finished second to Damascus. This effort was followed by wins in the Jersey Derby, Rumson Handicap and Choice Stakes.

In Reality next met up again with Damascus in the American Derby and came in second once more. Against Dr. Fager in the New Hampshire Sweepstakes Classic, he finished second again. In Reality made one more attempt at another stakes in the Jerome Handicap and again was second; after that, he laid off for the rest of the season.

In his four-year-old season, he finished third in both the Royal Palm and the Seminole Handicap. After taking a month off, he won the John B. Campbell Handicap, Carter Handicap, and Metropolitan Handicap. In Reality retired soon after his win in the Metropolitan to stand at stud for Frances A. Genter in Florida.

== Stud career ==
In Reality was bred and raced by Frances A. Genter and became an outstanding sire of three Champions and a good sire of sires. In Reality's male line remains one of the only male lines directly descended from Man O' War.

In Reality is the sire of:

- Desert Vixen (b. 1970) - U.S. Racing Hall of Fame Filly
- Believe It (b. 1975) Won Wood Memorial Stakes, third in Kentucky Derby and Preakness Stakes. Damsire of 1998 Kentucky Derby and Preakness Stakes and Eclipse Award winner Real Quiet.
- Relaunch (b. 1976) - Won Del Mar Derby. Grandsire of Hall of Fame inductee Tiznow and Damsire of 2004 World's Top Ranked Horse Ghostzapper
- Known Fact (b. 1977) - Won the 1979 Middle Park Stakes & the 1980 2,000 Guineas Stakes, English Champion Three-Year-Old Colt
- Smile (b. 1982) - Won 1986 Breeders' Cup Sprint, American Champion Sprint Horse, Damsire of Smarty Jones

In Reality is also the damsire of:

- Real Shadai (b. 1979) - 1993 Leading sire in Japan
- Commendable (b. 1997) - Won 2000 Belmont Stakes
- Mane Minister (b. 1988) - Won 1991 Santa Catalina Stakes
- Meadow Star (b. 1988) - Won 1990 Breeders' Cup Juvenile Fillies and American Champion Two-Year-Old Filly
- Toussaud (b. 1989) - Won 1993 Gamely Stakes and Kentucky Broodmare of the Year

== Sire line tree ==
- In Reality
  - Valid Appeal
    - Proud Appeal
    - Mighty Appealing
    - Southern Appeal
    - Kipper Kelly
      - Kelly Kip
    - Mister Jolie
    - Valid Wager
    - Seacliff
    - Valid Expectations
      - The Daddy
    - K J's Appeal
    - Successful Appeal
      - Closing Argument
      - J P's Gusto
  - Believe It
    - Believe The Queen
    - Garthorn
    - Al Mamoon
  - Classic Trial
  - Relaunch
    - Launch a Pegasus
    - Skywalker
      - Bertrando
        - Stormy Jack
        - Officer
        - Bilo
        - Unfurl the Flag
        - Karelian
        - Liberian Freighter
        - Sierra Sunset
        - Coach Bob
        - Tamerando
      - Al Skywalker
      - Sky Terrace
    - Waquoit
      - Wicapi
      - Crosspatch
      - Buck Trout
      - Docent
    - Cees Tizzy
      - Tiznow
        - Well Armed
        - Bullsbay
        - Tiz Wonderful
        - Colonel John
        - Da' Tara
        - Tizdejavu
        - Tizway
        - Mr Hot Stuff
        - Morning Line
        - Gemologist
        - Fury Kapcori
        - Norumbega
        - Dynamic Impact
        - Strong Mandate
        - Tourist
        - Tiz Shea D
        - Igor
        - Irap
        - Tiz a Slam
        - Sporting Chance
        - Dennis Moment
        - Midnight Bourbon
      - Cost of Freedom
    - Honour and Glory
      - Put It Back
        - Black Bar Spin
        - In Summation
        - Put Back the Shu
        - Smokey Stover
        - Nitido
        - Pirate Saint
        - Skypilot
        - Sol de Angra
        - Bal a Bali
        - Desjado Put
        - English Major
        - Noholdingback Bear
        - Fitzgerald
        - Flight Time
        - Garbo Talks
        - Glory Boy
        - Pimpers Paradise
      - Blues and Royals
      - Codigo de Honor
      - Cuestion de Honor
      - Honour Devil
      - Indio Glorioso
      - Mach Glory
    - With Anticipation
  - Known Fact
    - Warning
      - Averti
        - Avonbridge
      - Piccolo
        - Helter Skelter
        - Picaday
        - Picardi Run
        - Winker Watson
        - Flying Blue
        - Temple of Boom
        - Tiddliwinks
        - Poyle Vinnie
      - Annus Mirabillis
      - Bishop of Cashel
      - Charnwood Forest
        - Firebreak
      - Decorated Hero
      - Diktat
        - Formal Decree
        - Definightly
        - Skins Game
        - Dream Ahead
        - First Selection
      - Little Rock
      - Danger Over
      - Give Notice
      - Calstone Light O
    - Markofdistinction
      - Hokkai Rousseau
    - So Factual
      - Ialysos
    - Bold Fact
  - Court Trial
  - Star Choice
  - Sunshine Today
  - Smile
    - Smiling Time
  - Proper Reality

== Pedigree ==
Pedigree of In Reality, bay stallion, foaled March 1, 1964
Sire Intentionally black 1956	Intent ch. 1948	War Relic* ch. 1938	Man o' War*
Sire Intentionally black 1956	Intent ch. 1948	War Relic* ch. 1938	Friar's Carse*
Sire Intentionally black 1956	Intent ch. 1948	Liz F. ch. 1933	Bubbling Over
Sire Intentionally black 1956	Intent ch. 1948	Liz F. ch. 1933	Weno
Sire Intentionally black 1956	My Recipe b. 1947	Discovery ch. 1931	Display
Sire Intentionally black 1956	My Recipe b. 1947	Discovery ch. 1931	Ariadne
Sire Intentionally black 1956	My Recipe b. 1947	Perlette dkb/br. 1934	Percentage
Sire Intentionally black 1956	My Recipe b. 1947	Perlette dkb/br. 1934	Escarpolette
Dam My Dear Girl chestnut 1957	Rough'n Tumble b. 1948	Free For All dkb/br. 1942	Questionnaire
Dam My Dear Girl chestnut 1957	Rough'n Tumble b. 1948	Free For All dkb/br. 1942	Panay
Dam My Dear Girl chestnut 1957	Rough'n Tumble b. 1948	Roused b. 1943	Bull Dog
Dam My Dear Girl chestnut 1957	Rough'n Tumble b. 1948	Roused b. 1943	Rude Awakening
Dam My Dear Girl chestnut 1957	Iltis b. 1947	War Relic* ch. 1938	Man o' War*
Dam My Dear Girl chestnut 1957	Iltis b. 1947	War Relic* ch. 1938	Friar's Carse*
Dam My Dear Girl chestnut 1957	Iltis b. 1947	We Hail dkb/br. 1942	Balladier
Dam My Dear Girl chestnut 1957	Iltis b. 1947	We Hail dkb/br. 1942	Clonaslee (Family 21-a)

* In Reality is inbred 3S × 3D to the stallion War Relic, meaning that he appears third generation on the sire side of his pedigree and third generation on the dam side of his pedigree.
