= Piccolo (horse) =

British-bred Thoroughbred racehorse

- Sire: Warning
- Grandsire: Known Fact
- Dam: Woodwind
- Damsire: Whistling Wind
- Sex: Stallion
- Foaled: 8 May 1991
- Died: 17 April 2016
- Country: United Kingdom
- Colour: Bay
- Breeder: Stanley Estate and Stud Co
- Owner: T Leigh; John Mitchell; John White
- Trainer: Mick Channon
- Record: 21: 4-4-4
- Earnings: £267,710

Major wins
- Chipchase Stakes (1994); Nunthorpe Stakes (1994); King's Stand Stakes (1995)

Piccolo (8 May 1991 – 17 April 2016) was a British Thoroughbred racehorse and sire. He showed promising but unremarkable form in his early career, winning one of his first ten starts. In the summer of his three-year-old season he was switched to sprint distances and became a top class performer, winning the Chipchase Stakes before being awarded the Nunthorpe Stakes on the disqualification of Blue Siren. He returned as a four-year-old in 1995 and won the King's Stand Stakes at Royal Ascot. Apart from his victories he also finished second in both the Haydock Sprint Cup and the July Cup. After his retirement from racing he became a successful breeding stallion.

== Background ==
Piccolo is a bay horse with a white stripe and three white coronet marks bred by the 18th Earl of Derby's Stanley Estate. He was one of the first crop of foals sired by Warning, the top-rated European racehorse of 1988 who stood as a breeding stallion in Europe before being exported to Japan. The best of his other progeny included Diktat (Prix Maurice de Gheest, Haydock Sprint Cup), Charnwood Forest (Queen Anne Stakes) and Annus Mirabilis (Dubai Duty Free). Warning was a male-line descendant of the Godolphin Arabian, unlike more than 95% of modern thoroughbreds, who trace their ancestry to the Darley Arabian.

Piccolo's dam Woodwind showed useful form in a brief racing career, winning two races from four starts an achieving a Timeform rating of 103 as a two-year-old in 1975. She was one of numerous winners descended from the Irish broodmare Lady Kells: others have included Exceller, Sakhee and Mastercraftsman.

As a yearling Piccolo was consigned to the Tattersalls sale at Newmarket and was bought for 18,500 guineas by the trainer Mick Channon.

== Racing career ==
=== 1993: two-year-old season ===
Piccolo began his racing career in a five furlong maiden race at Newbury Racecourse on 15 May in which he started 3/1 favourite but finished seventh of the nineteen runners behind Prince Babar. He then finished eighth in a maiden at Doncaster Racecourse two weeks later, and returned in August to finish third in seven furlong maiden races at Newbury and Newcastle. In the latter race he was beaten two and a half lengths by the future Epsom Derby winner Erhaab. On 11 September he contested a minor event over six furlongs at Doncaster and recorded his first success, recovering from a poor start to win by two lengths from the Richrd Hannon-trained favourite Blue Bomber. On his final run of the season he was moved up in class for a valuable sales race at Newmarket Racecourse on 29 September and finished third of the thirty runners behind Fumo di Londra and Nicolotte.

=== 1994: three-year-old season ===
Piccolo had a busy schedule as a three-year-old in 1994, contesting eleven races in six months. He began his campaign in the European Free Handicap at Newmarket in April and finished seventh behind Bluegrass Prince. He was then stepped up to the highest level for the classic 2000 Guineas at the same course two weeks later. He started a 100/1 outsider and finished twentieth of the twenty-three runners behind Mister Baileys. He was then sent to Germany for the Mehl-Mülhens-Rennen over 1600 metres at Cologne on 15 May and finished second to the locally trained Royal Abjar.

In June, Piccolo was brought back to sprint distances for the Cork and Orrery Stakes at Royal Ascot and finished fifth of the seventeen runners behind Owington. At Newcastle nine days later, he contested the Listed Chipchase Stakes and started 7/2 joint-favourite with the Ian Balding-trained filly Blue Siren. Ridden by Francis "Franny" Norton, he started slowly but took the lead inside the final furlong and won by three quarters of a length from Roger the Butler with Blue Siren in fifth. In the July Cup at Newmarket he started a 20/1 outsider and finished sixth behind Owington before being sent to Ireland for the Phoenix Sprint Stakes at Leopardstown Racecourse on 7 August. He started the 11/8 favourite but was defeated by the four-year-old Surprise Offer.

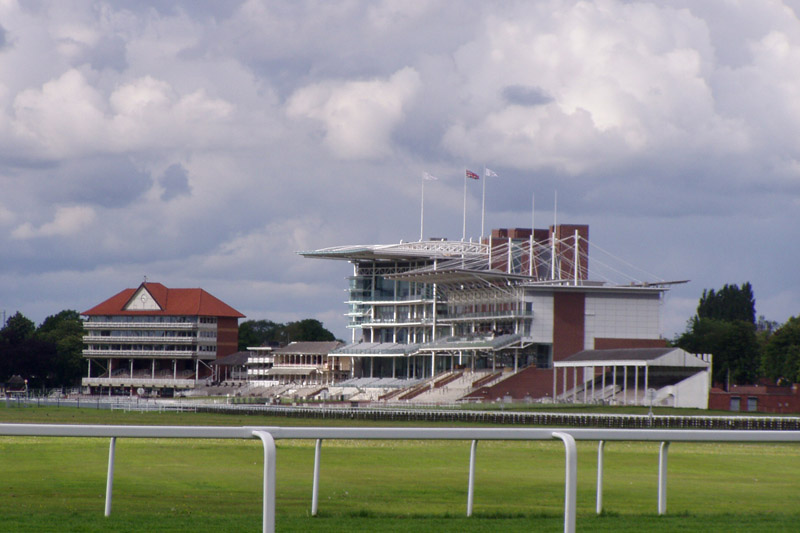
York Racecourse, where Piccolo won the Nunthorpe Stakes in 1994

Nine days after his defeat in Ireland, Piccolo was one of ten sprinters to contest the Nunthorpe Stakes over five furlongs at York Racecourse. Ridden as in his two previous starts by John Reid he started a 14/1 outsider whilst the six-year-old mare Lochsong was made odds-on favourite to repeat her 1993 victory in the race. The other runners included Mistertopogigo (Epsom Dash), Blyton Lad (World Trophy), Great Deeds (Ballyogan Stakes), Blue Siren, Up And At 'Em (Cornwallis Stakes) and Palacegate Jack (Harry Rosebery Stakes). Piccolo started slowly but was soon in contention before making a forward move in the last quarter mile. A furlong out Blue Siren who had been struggling to obtain a clear run was switched left by her jockey Michael Hills, bumping Piccolo in the process. The filly overtook the front-running Palacegate Jack inside the final furlong and came home a length and a half in front of Piccolo but Reid immediately lodged an objection and an inquiry by the racecourse stewards followed. Blue Siren was disqualified and the race awarded to Piccolo. The decision gave Channon his first Group One success.

Piccolo reappeared in the Haydock Sprint Cup on 3 September and finished second to the mare Lavinia Fontana with Owington in third. He was then sent to France and finished unplaced behind Lochsong in the Prix de l'Abbaye before ending his season in the Challenge Stakes over seven furlongs at Newmarket on 13 October when he finished sixth of the eight runners behind Zieten.

=== 1995: four-year-old season ===
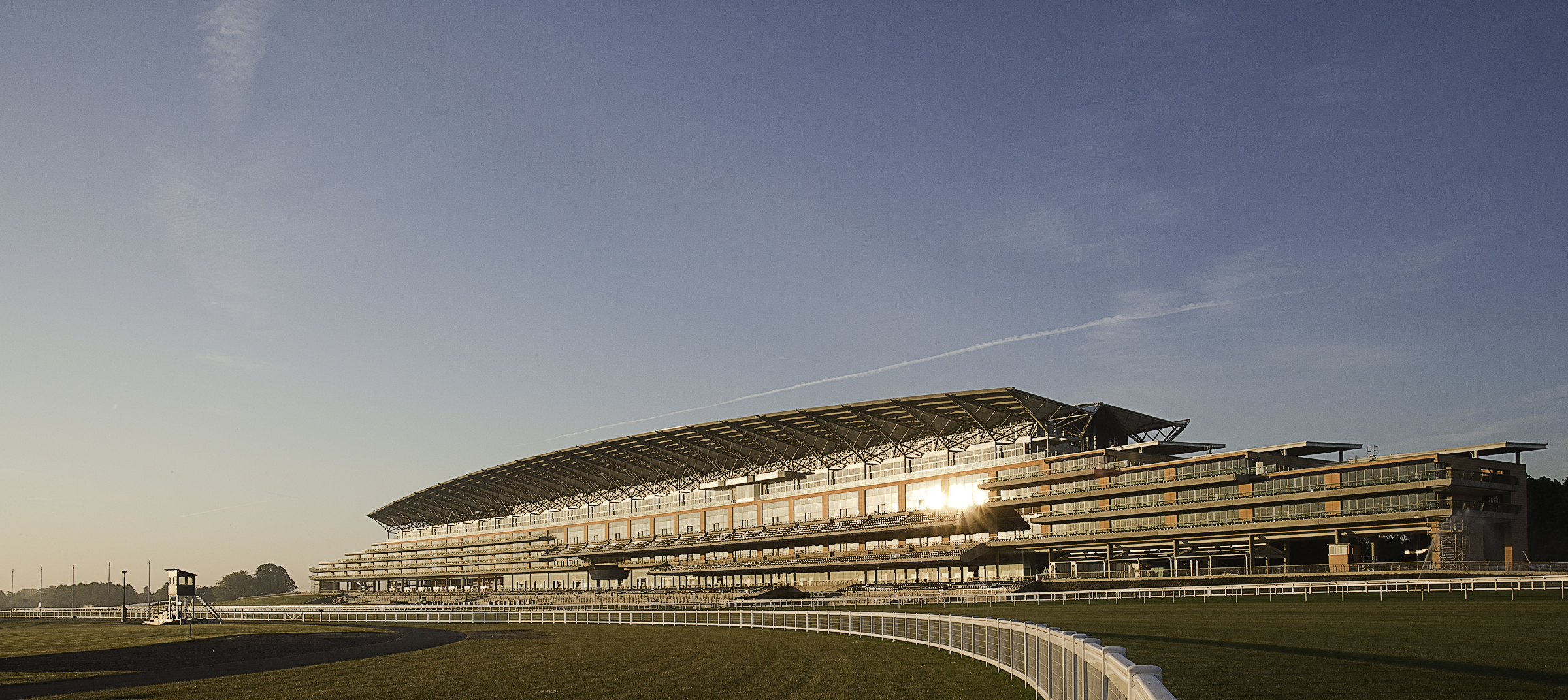
Ascot Racecourse, where Piccolo won the King's Stand Stakes in 1995

As a four-year-old, Piccolo was kept to sprint distances and ran four times. After finishing sixth behind the three-year-old Mind Games in the Palace House Stakes on 6 May he was sent to Germany and finished third to Wessam Prince in the Bénazet-Rennen over 1200 metres at Baden-Baden. On 20 June Piccolo contested the King's Stand Stakes at Royal Ascot and started a 20/1 outsider in a ten-runner field. Mind Games was made favourite whilst the other runners were Hoh Magic (Prix Morny), Fard (Middle Park Stakes), Millstream (Cornwallis Stakes), Millyant (Prix du Petit Couvert, Prix du Gros Chêne), Eva Luna (Phoenix Stakes), Struggler (Prix de Saint Georges), Eveningperformance (Scarbrough Stakes) and Mistertopogigo. Ridden by Richard Hughes, he raced in mid-division as Eveningperformance set the pace before making progress approaching the final furlong. Piccolo overtook Mind Games in the closing stages and ran on to win by one and a half lengths from Struggler with the favourite half a length away in third. On 13 July the colt started 7/1 third favourite for the July Cup and finished second, four lengths behind the winner Lake Coniston.

Piccolo did not race again and was retired from racing at the end of the season.

== Stud career ==
After his retirement from racing Piccolo became a breeding stallion. He stood at the Lavington Stud in Sussex before moving to the Lanwades Stud at Newmarket in 2007. He has had success as a sire of sprint horses, with he best of his progeny included La Cucaracha (who emulated her sire by winning the Nunthorpe), Temple of Boom (The Galaxy), Flying Blue (Chairman's Trophy), Tiddliwinks (Duke of York Stakes), Winker Watson (July Stakes) and Poyle Vinnie. After 2010 he stood at the Throckmorton Court Stud near Pershore in Worcestershire. He died of colic on 17 April 2016.

== Pedigree ==
Pedigree of Piccolo (GB), bay stallion, 1991
Sire Warning (GB) 1985	Known Fact (USA); 1977	In Reality	Intentionally
Sire Warning (GB) 1985	Known Fact (USA); 1977	In Reality	My Dear Girl
Sire Warning (GB) 1985	Known Fact (USA); 1977	Tamerett	Tim Tam
Sire Warning (GB) 1985	Known Fact (USA); 1977	Tamerett	Mixed Marriage
Sire Warning (GB) 1985	Slightly Dangerous (USA); 1979	Roberto	Hail To Reason
Sire Warning (GB) 1985	Slightly Dangerous (USA); 1979	Roberto	Bramalea
Sire Warning (GB) 1985	Slightly Dangerous (USA); 1979	Where You Lead	Raise a Native
Sire Warning (GB) 1985	Slightly Dangerous (USA); 1979	Where You Lead	Noblesse
Dam Woodwind (FR) 1973	Whistling Wind (GB); 1960	Whistler	Panorama
Dam Woodwind (FR) 1973	Whistling Wind (GB); 1960	Whistler	Farthing Damages
Dam Woodwind (FR) 1973	Whistling Wind (GB); 1960	Good As Gold	Nimbus
Dam Woodwind (FR) 1973	Whistling Wind (GB); 1960	Good As Gold	Gamble In Gold
Dam Woodwind (FR) 1973	Garden Green (IRE); 1964	Pinturischio	Pinza
Dam Woodwind (FR) 1973	Garden Green (IRE); 1964	Pinturischio	Natalina da Murano
Dam Woodwind (FR) 1973	Garden Green (IRE); 1964	Focal	Faubourg
Dam Woodwind (FR) 1973	Garden Green (IRE); 1964	Focal	Lady Kells (Family: 21-a)
