= Summer Mile Stakes =

Flat horse race in Britain

- Class: Group 2
- Location: Ascot Racecourse; Ascot, England
- Race type: Flat / Thoroughbred
- Website: Ascot

Race information
- Distance: 7f 213y (1,603 metres)
- Surface: Turf
- Track: Right-handed
- Qualification: Four-years-old and up
- Weight: 9 st 1 lb Allowances; 3 lb for fillies and mares Penalties; 5 lb for Group 1 winners * 3 lb for Group 2 winners * * since 2018
- Purse: £110,000 (2021); 1st: £62,381

Summer Mile Stakes
2026
Zeus Olympios	Holloway Boy	Seagulls Eleven

Previous years
2025
Never So Brave	Point Lynas	Haatem
2024
Quddwah	Ancient Rome	Embesto
2023
Master of The Seas	Aldaary	Jimi Hendrix
2022
Chindit	Mutasaabeq	My Oberon
2021
Tilsit	Century Dream	Al Suhail

2020-2011
2020
Mohaather	San Donato	Duke Of Hazzard
2019
Beat The Bank	Zaaki	Suedois
2018
Beat The Bank	Lord Glitters	Suedois
2017
Mutakayyef	Kaspersky	Hathal
2016
Mutakayyef	Dutch Connection	Gabrial
2015
Arod	Lightning Spear	Cable Bay
2014
Guest of Honour	Mull Of Killough	Long John
2013
Aljamaaheer	Mull Of Killough	Guest of Honour
2012
Fanunalter	Pastoral Player	Tullius
2011
Dick Turpin	Fanunalter	Side Glance

2010-2001
2010
Premio Loco	Vertigineux	Dream Eater
2009
Aqlaam	Confront	Imbongi
2008
Archipenko	Barshiba	Cesare
2007
Cesare	Royal Oath	Heaven Sent
2006
Echo of Light	Satchem	Notability
2005
Autumn Glory	Court Masterpiece	Vortex
2004
Shot To Fame	Gateman	Hurricane Alan
2003
Tillerman	Beauchamp Pilot	Right Approach
2002
Fallen Star	Inglenook	Tough Speed
2001
Cape Town	Swallow Flight	Injaaz

2000-1991
2000
Sugarfoot	Pulau Tioman	Duck Row
1999
Wallace	Haami	Sugarfoot
1998
Fizzed	Headhunter	Pantar
1997
Cadeaux Tryst	Tregaron	Star Talent
1996
Almushtarak	Double Blue	Bewitching
1995
Moccasin Run	Wizard King	Croft Valley
1994
Gymcrak Premiere	Chickawicka	Cragganmore
1993
Croft Valley	Little Bean	Mizaaya
1992
Thourios	Toussaud	Casteddu
1991
Green Line Express	Lee Artiste	Sylva Honda

1990-1988
1990
Green Line Express	Daarik	Lord Florey
1989
Markofdistinction	Tatsfield	Church Light
1988
Warning	Salse	Gold Prospect

The Summer Mile Stakes is a Group 2 flat horse race in Great Britain open to horses aged four years or older. It is run at Ascot over a distance of 7 furlongs and 213 yards (1,603 metres), and it is scheduled to take place each year in July.

== History ==
The event was formerly known as the Silver Trophy Stakes, and it used to be held at Lingfield Park. For a period it was a Listed race open to horses aged three or older, and it was contested over 7 furlongs and 140 yards. It was run as a handicap from 1993 to 1998. It was switched to Ascot and extended to a mile in 1999.

The Silver Trophy Stakes was promoted to Group 3 level in 2003, and from this point it excluded three-year-olds. It returned to Lingfield when Ascot was closed for redevelopment in 2005. That year's edition was the first Group race in Britain run on a synthetic surface.

The event was renamed the Summer Mile Stakes in 2006. It was upgraded to Group 2 status and transferred back to Ascot in 2007.

== Records ==
Most successful horse (2 wins):

- Green Line Express – 1990, 1991
- Mutakayyef - 2016, 2017

Leading jockey (4 wins):

- Dane O'Neill - Cape Town (2001), Mutakayyef (2016, 2017), Mohaather (2020)

Leading trainer (4 wins):

- Richard Hannon Sr. – Hard Round (1986), Wallace (1999), Cape Town (2001), Dick Turpin (2011)

== Winners ==
Year	Winner	Age	Jockey	Trainer	Time
1983	Lyphards Special	3	Greville Starkey	Guy Harwood	1:31.51
1984	Condrillac	3	Lester Piggott	Henry Cecil	1:31.95
1985	Protection	3	Steve Cauthen	Henry Cecil	1:30.26
1986	Hard Round	3	Brian Rouse	Richard Hannon Sr.	1:30.65
1987	Hiaam	3	Paul Cook	Michael Stoute	1:26.73
1988	Warning	3	Pat Eddery	Guy Harwood	1:28.81
1989	Markofdistinction	3	Frankie Dettori	Luca Cumani	1:31.51
1990	Green Line Express	4	Michael Hills	Mohammed Moubarak	1:28.65
1991	Green Line Express	5	Tony Cruz	Mohammed Moubarak	1:30.90
1992	Thourios	3	Michael Hills	Guy Harwood	1:28.46
1993	Croft Valley	6	Dean McKeown	Reg Akehurst	1:31.73
1994	Gymcrak Premiere	6	Billy Newnes	Gordon Holmes	1:29.35
1995	Moccasin Run	4	David Griffiths	Ian Balding	1:27.15
1996	Almushtarak	3	Ray Cochrane	Gay Kelleway	1:28.80
1997	Cadeaux Tryst	5	Richard Hills	Ed Dunlop	1:28.48
1998	Fizzed	3	Richard Hughes	Mark Johnston	1:28.48
1999	Wallace	3	Richard Hughes	Richard Hannon Sr.	1:40.72
2000	Sugarfoot	6	Willie Ryan	Nigel Tinkler	1:41.43
2001	Cape Town	4	Dane O'Neill	Richard Hannon Sr.	1:41.50
2002	Fallen Star	4	Steve Drowne	John Dunlop	1:40.96
2003	Tillerman	7	Richard Hughes	Amanda Perrett	1:40.78
2004	Shot to Fame	5	Frankie Dettori	Peter Harris	1:42.49
2005	Autumn Glory	5	Steve Drowne	Geoff Wragg	1:36.45
2006	Echo of Light	4	Kerrin McEvoy	Saeed bin Suroor	1:36.23
2007	Cesare	6	Jamie Spencer	James Fanshawe	1:40.65
2008	Archipenko	4	Kevin Shea	Mike de Kock	1:42.16
2009	Aqlaam	4	Richard Hills	William Haggas	1:39.92
2010	Premio Loco	6	George Baker	Chris Wall	1:40.43
2011	Dick Turpin	4	Pat Dobbs	Richard Hannon Sr.	1:41.48
2012	Fanunalter	6	Olivier Peslier	Michael Wigham	1:41.36
2013	Aljamaaheer	4	Paul Hanagan	Roger Varian	1:38.51
2014	Guest Of Honour	5	Martin Harley	Marco Botti	1:39.34
2015	Arod	4	Andrea Atzeni	Peter Chapple-Hyam	1:40.31
2016	Mutakayyef	5	Dane O'Neill	William Haggas	1:40.88
2017	Mutakayyef	6	Dane O'Neill	William Haggas	1:41.60
2018	Beat The Bank	4	Oisin Murphy	Andrew Balding	1:39.39
2019	Beat The Bank	5	Silvestre de Sousa	Andrew Balding	1:39.20
2020	Mohaather	4	Dane O'Neill	Marcus Tregoning	1:39.53
2021	Tilsit	4	Kieran Shoemark	Charles Hills	1:43.73
2022	Chindit	4	Pat Dobbs	Richard Hannon Jr.	1:41.89
2023	Master of The Seas	5	James Doyle	Charlie Appleby	1:45.54
2024	Quddwah	4	Callum Shepherd	Simon & Ed Crisford	1:41.36
2025	Never So Brave	4	David Probert	Andrew Balding	1:38.69
2026	Zeus Olympios	4	Sam James	Karl Burke	1:40.15

== See also ==
- Horse racing in Great Britain
- List of British flat horse races
