= Prime Defender =

British-bred Thoroughbred racehorse

- Sire: Bertolini
- Grandsire: Danzig
- Dam: Arian Da
- Damsire: Superlative
- Sex: Stallion
- Foaled: 30 March 2004
- Country: United Kingdom
- Colour: Chestnut
- Breeder: Christopher J Mason
- Owner: Steve Falle, Matt Franklin and James Sumsion
- Trainer: Barry Hills
- Record: 57:8-6-3
- Earnings: £270,444

Major wins
- European Free Handicap (2007); Sandy Lane Stakes (2007); Cammidge Trophy (2009); Duke of York Stakes (2010)

Prime Defender (30 March 2004 – 24 July 2012) was a British Thoroughbred racehorse.

== Background ==
Prime Defender was a chestnut horse with a white blaze bred by Christopher J Mason. He was one of the best horses sired by Bertolini a "high class sprinter" who won the July Stakes in 1998. He was trained by Barry Hills in Lambourn and owned by friends Steve Falle, Matt Franklin and James Sumsion.

== Racing career ==
As a three-year-old, Prime Defender won the European Free Handicap at Newmarket Racecourse in April and the Sandy Lane Stakes at Haydock Park in May. After a long break without a major win he won the Cammidge Trophy at Doncaster in March 2009. He recorded his most important victory as a six-year-old in August 2010 when he won the Group Two (Duke of York Stakes). Prime Defender holds the juvenile and overall track record at Wolverhampton.

== Stud career ==
Prime Defender was retired to Hedgeholme Stud in County Durham at the end of the 2011, but after having fertility problems he was returned to training the following year with the Nottinghamshire trainer Michael Appleby. He was being prepared for a return to racing when he died of a heart attack in a training gallop on 24 July 2012.

== Pedigree ==
Pedigree of Prime Defender (GB), chestnut stallion, 2004
Sire Bertolini (USA) 1996	Danzig (USA); 1977	Northern Dancer	Nearctic
Sire Bertolini (USA) 1996	Danzig (USA); 1977	Northern Dancer	Natalma
Sire Bertolini (USA) 1996	Danzig (USA); 1977	Pas de Nom	Admiral's Voyage
Sire Bertolini (USA) 1996	Danzig (USA); 1977	Pas de Nom	Petitioner
Sire Bertolini (USA) 1996	Aquilegia (USA); 1989	Alydar	Raise a Native
Sire Bertolini (USA) 1996	Aquilegia (USA); 1989	Alydar	Sweet Tooth
Sire Bertolini (USA) 1996	Aquilegia (USA); 1989	Courtly Dee	Never Bend
Sire Bertolini (USA) 1996	Aquilegia (USA); 1989	Courtly Dee	Tulle
Dam Arian Da (GB) 1995	Superlative (IRE); 1981	Nebbiolo	Yellow God
Dam Arian Da (GB) 1995	Superlative (IRE); 1981	Nebbiolo	Novara
Dam Arian Da (GB) 1995	Superlative (IRE); 1981	Clariden	Hook Money
Dam Arian Da (GB) 1995	Superlative (IRE); 1981	Clariden	Matterhorn
Dam Arian Da (GB) 1995	Nell of the North (USA); 1977	Canadian Gil	Northern Dancer
Dam Arian Da (GB) 1995	Nell of the North (USA); 1977	Canadian Gil	Julie Kate
Dam Arian Da (GB) 1995	Nell of the North (USA); 1977	Sprinkle Power	Balance of Power
Dam Arian Da (GB) 1995	Nell of the North (USA); 1977	Sprinkle Power	Neila (Family: 4-o)
