= Waquoit =

American Thoroughbred racehorse

- Sire: Relaunch
- Grandsire: In Reality
- Dam: Grey Parlo
- Damsire: Grey Dawn
- Sex: Stallion
- Foaled: February 10, 1983
- Died: June 14, 2007 (aged 24)
- Country: United States
- Colour: Gray
- Breeder: Frank E. Mackle Jr.
- Owner: Joseph Federico
- Trainer: Guido Federico
- Record: 30: 19-4-3
- Earnings: US$2,225,360

Major wins
- Cape Cod Stakes (1985); Miles Standish Stakes (1985); Governor's Stakes (1985); Jamaica Handicap (1986); Yankee Handicap (1986); Brooklyn Handicap (1987, 1988); Michigan Mile And One-Eighth Handicap (1987); Massachusetts Handicap (1987); William Almy Jr. Handicap (1987); Jockey Club Gold Cup Stakes (1988); Governor's Handicap (Suffolk Downs) (1988)

Honours
- Waquoit Stakes at Suffolk Downs

Waquoit (February 10, 1983–June 14, 2007) was an American Thoroughbred racehorse who won races at short and long distances en route to career earnings of more than $2.2 million.

== Background ==
Standing close to seventeen hands, Waquoit was bred in Kentucky and sired by Relaunch, a multiple stakes winner who sired several top runners including two Breeders' Cup winners. Waquoit's dam was Grey Parlo, a daughter of Grey Dawn, the French Champion Two-Year-Old Colt who was the only horse to ever beat Sea-Bird and who became the leading broodmare sire in North America in 1990.

Waquoit was purchased at the 1984 Keeneland fall yearling sale for a very modest $15,000 by Joseph Federico, a Boston, Massachusetts building contractor and a native of Sulmona, in the Abruzzo Region of Italy. The colt was given the name of the village of Waquoit on Cape Cod. He was trained by Guido Federico, the owner's cousin.

== Racing career ==
Waquoit became known for his ability to run on muddy dirt tracks. He began racing from a base at Suffolk Downs in Boston. While he won several minor stakes as a two-year-old, during the latter part of his three-year-old campaign he began to show his true ability in October 1986 with wins in the Jamaica Handicap at New York's Belmont Park followed by the Yankee Handicap at Suffolk Downs. As a four-year-old in 1987, Waquoit won the Massachusetts Handicap in a thrilling stretch duel with Broad Brush. He also added the prestigious Brooklyn Handicap at Belmont Park. He was voted Horse of the Year by members of the New England Turf Writers Association.

Having been injured early in the year, Waquoit did not return to training until April 2, 1988. Making his first start on June 4, the now five-year-old Waquoit won the Governor's Handicap at Suffolk Downs by seven lengths. On July 24, he defeated Personal Flag to win his second consecutive edition of the Brooklyn Handicap. On October 8, 1988, he scored a fifteen-length win in the mile and a half Jockey Club Gold Cup. Waquoit was not nominated for the Breeders' Cup, so his owner paid a $360,000 supplemental fee in order to run him in the 1988 Breeders' Cup Classic. In the final start of his career, Waquoit finished third to Alysheba.

== Syndicated to stud ==
Syndicated for $3 million, beginning with the 1989 breeding season Waquoit stood at stud at the newly established Northview Stallion Station on acreage that had been Windfields Farm's Northview Annex at Chesapeake City, Maryland. He sired 348 winners including thirty stakes race winners. Of his progeny, millionaire Grade 1 winner Halo America was the most successful on the track. Through his daughter Ice Beauty, Waquoit was the damsire of Sweetnorthernsaint.

Twenty-four-year-old Waquoit was euthanized due to infirmities brought on by old age on June 14, 2007, at Northview Stallion Station in Chesapeake City, Md.

== Sire line tree ==
- Waquoit
  - Wicapi
  - Crosspatch
  - Buck Trout
  - Docent

== Pedigree ==
Pedigree of Waquoit, gray stallion, foaled February 10, 1983
Sire Relaunch gray 1976	In Reality b. 1964	Intentionally blk. 1956	Intent
Sire Relaunch gray 1976	In Reality b. 1964	Intentionally blk. 1956	My Recipe
Sire Relaunch gray 1976	In Reality b. 1964	My Dear Girl ch. 1957	Rough'n Tumble
Sire Relaunch gray 1976	In Reality b. 1964	My Dear Girl ch. 1957	Iltis
Sire Relaunch gray 1976	Foggy Note gr. 1965	The Axe II gr. 1958	Mahmoud*
Sire Relaunch gray 1976	Foggy Note gr. 1965	The Axe II gr. 1958	Blackball
Sire Relaunch gray 1976	Foggy Note gr. 1965	Silver Song gr. 1957	Royal Note
Sire Relaunch gray 1976	Foggy Note gr. 1965	Silver Song gr. 1957	Beadah
Dam Grey Parlo gray 1977	Grey Dawn II gr. 1962	Herbager b. 1956	Vandale
Dam Grey Parlo gray 1977	Grey Dawn II gr. 1962	Herbager b. 1956	Flagette
Dam Grey Parlo gray 1977	Grey Dawn II gr. 1962	Polamia gr. 1955	Mahmoud*
Dam Grey Parlo gray 1977	Grey Dawn II gr. 1962	Polamia gr. 1955	Ampola
Dam Grey Parlo gray 1977	Parlomia ch. 1971	Graustark ch. 1963	Ribot
Dam Grey Parlo gray 1977	Parlomia ch. 1971	Graustark ch. 1963	Flower Bowl
Dam Grey Parlo gray 1977	Parlomia ch. 1971	Parlo ch. 1951	Heliopolis
Dam Grey Parlo gray 1977	Parlomia ch. 1971	Parlo ch. 1951	Fairy Palace (Family 1-c)

* Waquoit is inbred 4S × 4D to the stallion Mahmoud, meaning that he appears fourth generation on the sire side of his pedigree and fourth generation on the dam side of his pedigree.
