= Cammidge Trophy =

Flat horse race in Britain

Cammidge Trophy Stakes
- Class: Listed
- Location: Doncaster Racecourse; Doncaster, England
- Race type: Flat / Thoroughbred
- Sponsor: William Hill
- Website: Doncaster

Race information
- Distance: 6f 2y (1,209 metres)
- Surface: Turf
- Track: Straight
- Qualification: Three-years-old and up exc G1 / G2 winners since 31 August
- Weight: 8 st 11 lb (3yo); 9 st 10 lb (4yo+); Allowances; 5 lb for fillies and mares Penalties; 5 lb for Group 3 winners * 3 lb for Listed winners * * since 31 August last year
- Purse: £60,000 (2024); 1st: £34,026

Cammidge Trophy
2026
Aramram	Jasour	Caburn

Previous years
2025
Spycatcher	Iberian	Marshman
2024
Montassib	Marshman	Orazio
2023
Vadream	Fast Response	Ehraz
2022
Volatile Analyst	Diligent Harry	Mondammej
2021
Royal Commando	Emaraaty Ana	Brando

2020-2011
2019
Invincible Army	Major Jumbo	Equilateral
2018
Perfect Pasture	Mr Lupton	Ice Age
2017
Tupi	Captain Colby	Pipers Note
2016
Mobsta	Suedois	Maarek
2015
Naadirr	Astaire	Perfect Blessings
2014
Dinkum Diamond	Captain Ramius	Jack Dexter
2013
Jack Dexter	Captain Ramius	Our Jonathan
2012
The Cheka	Jimmy Styles	Mayson
2011
Jimmy Styles	Iver Bridge Lad	Brave Prospector

2010-2001
2010
Inxile	Prime Defender	Fitz Flyer
2009
Prime Defender	Pusey Street Lady	Knot In Wood
2008
Aahayson	Sonny Red	Wi Dud
2007
Rising Shadow	Sierra Vista	Skhilling Spirit
2006
Les Arcs	Quito	Reverence
2005
La Cucaracha	The Kiddykid	Look Here's Carol
2004
Goldeva	Orientor	The Kiddykid
2003
Red Carpet	Orientor	Smokin Beau
2002
Falcon Hill	Needwood Blade	Orientor
2001
Now Look Here	Fire Dome	Munjiz

2000-1991
2000
Andreyev	Now Look Here	Cretan Gift
1999
Tedburrow	Yorkies Boy	Always Alight
1998
Monaassib	Cretan Gift	Tedburrow
1997
Royal Applause	Easy Dollar	King Of Peru
1996
Fire Dome	The Puzzler	Cool Jazz
1995
Montendre	Sharp Prod	Double Blue
1994
Amron	Montendre	Bid For Blue
1993
Regal Chimes	Silca-Cisa	Appledorn
1992
Fylde Flyer	Notley	Letsbeonestaboutit
1991
Palace Street	Tigani	Northern Goddess

1990-1988
1990
Mac's Fighter	Savahra Sound	Access Travel
1989
Silver Fling	Mac's Fighter	Access Travel
1988
Dawn's Delight	Cragside	Handsome Sailor

The Cammidge Trophy is a Listed flat horse race in Great Britain open to horses aged three years or older. It is run at Doncaster Racecourse over a distance of 6 furlongs and 2 yards (1,209 metres), and it is scheduled to take place each year in late March or early April. It is currently held on the opening day of the British flat racing turf season, at the same race meeting as the Lincoln Handicap.

== Winners ==
Year	Winner	Age	Jockey	Trainer	Time
1981	King Of Spain	5	John Reid	Peter Cundell	1:18.81
1982	Sayyaf	5	Tony Ives	Bill O'Gorman	1:14.07
1983	Vorvados	6	Lester Piggott	Mick Haynes	1:17.50
1984	Vorvados	7	Steve Cauthen	Mick Haynes	1:21.57
1985	John Patrick	4	John Matthias	Philip Mitchell	1:19.55
1986	Grey Desire	6	Kevin Darley	Mel Brittain	1:18.27
1987	Peatswood Shooter	3	Kevin Darley	Mel Brittain	1:18.58
1988	Dawn's Delight	10	Ray Cochrane	Ken Ivory	1:20.83
1989	Silver Fling	4	John Matthias	Ian Balding	1:11.96
1990	Mac's Fighter	5	Pat Eddery	Bill O'Gorman	1:12.53
1991	Palace Street	4	John Williams	Toby Balding	1:18.51
1992	Fylde Flyer	3	John Carroll	Jack Berry	1:17.11
1993	Regal Chimes	4	Alan Munro	Bryan McMahon	1:12.28
1994	Amron	7	Nicky Carlisle	Jack Berry	1:12.30
1995	Montendre	8	John Reid	Matt McCormack	1:14.44
1996	Fire Dome	4	Richard Hughes	Richard Hannon Sr.	1:18.40
1997	Royal Applause	4	Michael Hills	Barry Hills	1:13.01
1998	Monaassib	7	Kevin Darley	Ed Dunlop	1:15.03
1999	Tedburrow	7	Michael Hills	Eric Alston	1:15.37
2000	Andreyev	6	Jimmy Fortune	Richard Hannon Sr.	1:14.50
2001	Now Look Here	5	John Reid	Bryan McMahon	1:17.97
2002	Falcon Hill	3	Royston Ffrench	Mark Johnston	1:16.76
2003	Red Carpet	5	Kieren Fallon	Michael Bell	1:13.19
2004	Goldeva	5	Tony Culhane	Reg Hollinshead	1:13.89
2005	La Cucaracha	4	Michael Hills	Barry Hills	1:12.76
2006 (Note: The race was run at Redcar in 2006 and Newcastle in 2007, both due to the temporary closure of Doncaster Racecourse as part of its redevelopment.)	Les Arcs	6	Neil Callan	Tim Pitt	1:16.36
2007	Rising Shadow	6	Jimmy Quinn	David Barron	1:16.96
2008	Aahayson	4	Fergus Sweeney	Karl Burke	1:14.50
2009	Prime Defender	5	Michael Hills	Barry Hills	1:10.62
2010	Inxile	5	Paul Hanagan	David Nicholls	1:16.31
2011	Jimmy Styles	7	Adam Kirby	Clive Cox	1:12.38
2012	The Cheka	6	Neil Callan	Eve Johnson Houghton	1:11.71
2013	Jack Dexter	4	Graham Lee	Jim Goldie	1:14.51
2014	Dinkum Diamond	6	Oisin Murphy	Henry Candy	1:13.48
2015	Naadirr	4	Martin Harley	Marco Botti	1:13.61
2016	Mobsta	4	Silvestre de Sousa	Mick Channon	1:18.03
2017	Tupi	5	Ryan Moore	Richard Hannon Jr.	1:11.28
2018	Perfect Pasture	8	David Allan	Michael Easterby	1:16.18
2019	Invincible Army	4	P. J. McDonald	James Tate	1:11.63
	no race 2020 (Note: The 2020 running was cancelled because of the COVID-19 pandemic in the United Kingdom)
2021	Royal Commando	4	Kieran Shoemark	Charles Hills	1:12.60
2022	Volatile Analyst	5	Callum Rodriguez	Keith Dalgleish	1:11.84
2023	Vadream	5	Kieran Shoemark	Charlie Fellowes	1:17.25
2024	Montassib	6	Cieren Fallon	William Haggas	1:17.16
2025	Spycatcher	7	James Doyle	Karl Burke	1:13.34
2026	Aramram	5	Sean Levey	Richard Hannon Jr.	1:13.83

== See also ==
- Horse racing in Great Britain
- List of British flat horse races
