= Flying Blue (horse) =

Australian-bred Thoroughbred racehorse

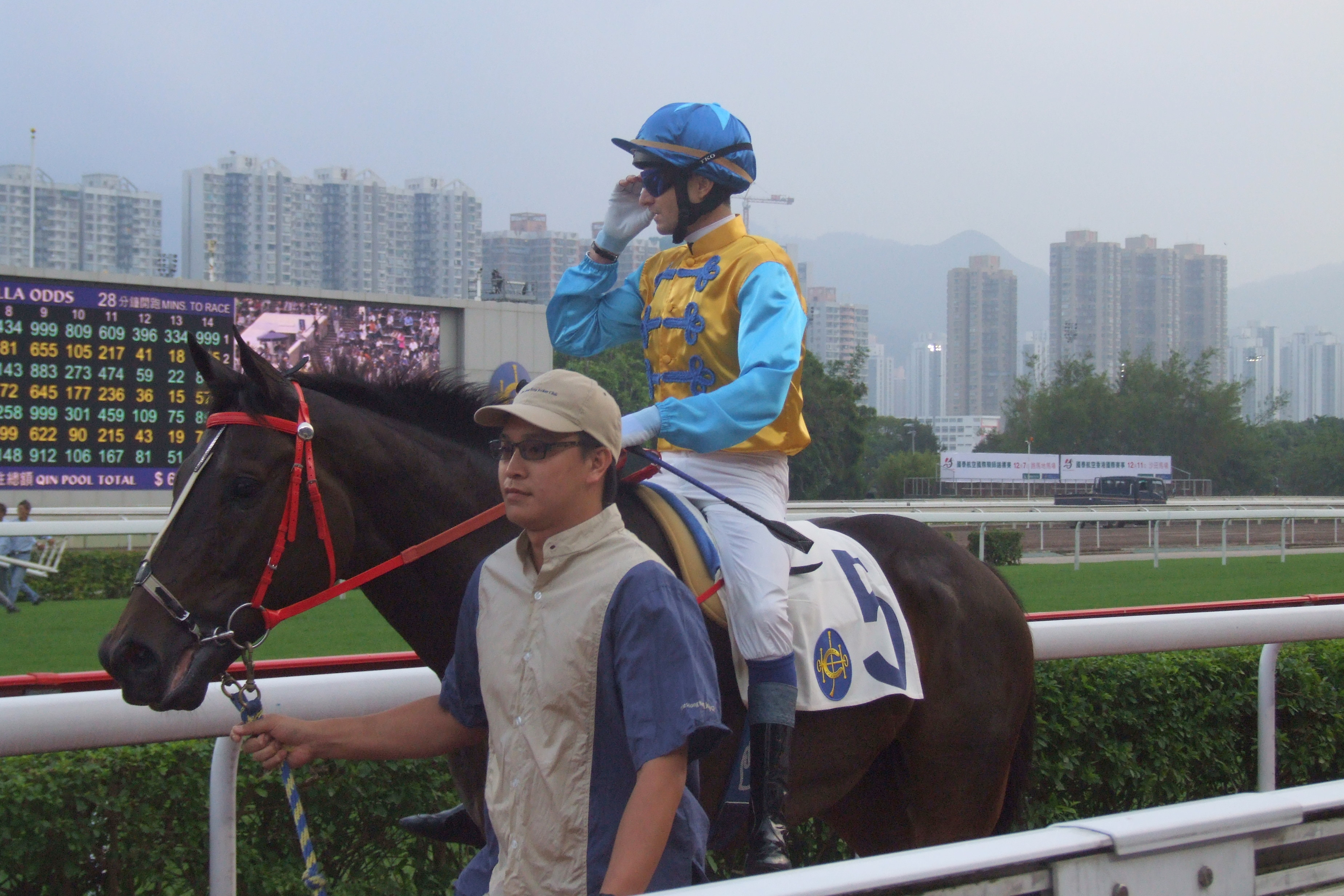
- Flying Blue
- Sire: Piccolo
- Grandsire: Warning
- Dam: Bright Blue
- Damsire: Scenic
- Sex: Gelding
- Foaled: 11 September 2006
- Country: Australia
- Colour: Brown
- Breeder: B. J. & Mrs L. E. Anderton
- Owner: Abterra Syndicate
- Trainer: Derek Cruz
- Record: 21:4-3-2
- Earnings: HK$5,038,500 (As of 18 May 2015)

Flying Blue (Chinese: 勁飛寶 ; foaled 11 September 2006) is an Australian-bred, Hong Kong–based racehorse. He was one of the nominees of 2010–2011 Hong Kong Horse of the Year.

== Background ==
Flying Blue is a brown gelding bred in Australia by B. J. & Mrs L. E. Anderton. He was sired by the British sprinter Piccolo, whose other progeny include La Cucaracha (Nunthorpe Stakes) and Picaday (The T J Smith). He is a representative of the Godolphin Arabian sire-line.

== Racing career ==
Based at Sha Tin Racecourse Flying Blue has earned more than HK$4.4M in prize money. His wins include the Chairman's Trophy in April 2011, when he won from a field which included Viva Pataca.
