= Noblesse (horse) =

British-bred Thoroughbred racehorse

- Sire: Mossborough
- Grandsire: Nearco
- Dam: Duke's Delight
- Damsire: His Grace
- Sex: Filly
- Foaled: 1960
- Country: Great Britain
- Colour: Chestnut
- Breeder: P. M. Margetts
- Owner: Evelyn Olin
- Trainer: Paddy Prendergast
- Record: 5: 4-0-1
- Earnings: US$134,688 (equivalent)

Major wins
- Blue Seal Stakes (1962); Timeform Gold Cup (1962); Musidora Stakes (1963); Epsom Oaks (1963)

Awards
- Champion Two-Year-Old Filly (1962); Champion Three-Year-Old Filly (1963); Timeform rating 133

Honours
- Noblesse Stakes at Cork Racecourse

Noblesse (1960–1972) was an Irish Thoroughbred racehorse and broodmare.

== Background ==
Owned by American Evelyn Olin, she was sired by Mossborough, who also sired the great Ballymoss, and was out of the mare Duke's Delight (by His Grace). The mating of Mossborough and Duke's Delight was arranged by the mare's owner Stanhope Joel. The pregnant Duke's Delight was sent to the Newmarket sales in December 1959 where she was bought for 1,150 guineas by the British Bloodstock Agency on behalf of Mrs P.M. Margetts, who therefore became Noblesse's official breeder when the filly was born in 1960. Having been bought as a yearling for 4,200 guineas by the Anglo-Irish Bloodstock Agency, she went into training with Irish trainer Paddy Prendergast on the Curragh. Although trained in Ireland, she never raced on Irish soil.

== Racing career ==
=== 1962: two-year-old season ===
Paddy Prendergast was known as an outstanding trainer of juveniles, and when Noblesse travelled over to England as a two-year-old to make her debut in Ascot's Blue Seal Stakes, she was preceded by a tall reputation. Starting a short-priced favourite, she lived up to the hype with a 5-length victory. This was followed by just one more run that season when taking on the colts in the Timeform Gold Cup (now known as the Racing Post Trophy) at Doncaster which, at the time, was the richest two-year-old race in Europe. Noblesse passed the post on a tight rein with a 3-length advantage. She is still the only filly ever to have triumphed in this prestigious race. The performance earned her the title of Champion two-year-old filly for 1962, and she finished the season as ante-post favourite for both the 1,000 Guineas and Epsom Oaks in 1963.

=== 1963: three-year-old season ===
The following spring was one of the coldest on record and as a result, Noblesse was very slow to come to hand, meaning that Prendergast was unable to get her ready in time for the 1,000 Guineas at Newmarket. She eventually re-appeared at York in May for the Musidora Stakes, a recognised trial for the Oaks at Epsom. She quickened away from her rivals inside the final two furlongs to win eased down by six lengths. This resulted in her starting as the 11/4-on favourite for the Oaks a few weeks later.

In the Oaks of 1963, Noblesse was asked to quicken by her jockey Garnet Bougoure approaching the final furlong and responded to win by 10 lengths. The performance was described in Tony Morris and John Randall's publication 'A Century Of Champions' as "the crushing Oaks victory which made her Ireland's greatest filly." Noblesse was then expected to run in the King George VI and Queen Elizabeth Stakes at Ascot the following month. However, she injured a hock and was withdrawn; her stable companion Ragusa deputised for her and won the race.

As a result of her hock injury, it was decided to give Noblesse a couple of months rest before preparing her for a tilt at Europe's richest race, the Prix de l'Arc de Triomphe at Longchamp in October. Her preparatory race was to be the Prix Vermeille which is run over the same course and distance as the 'Arc'. Ridden by Lester Piggott in the 'Vermeille', Noblesse started a short-priced favourite but was beaten into third place and returned lame to the unsaddling enclosure. Since very little time remained to get her back fit and ready to run in the 'Arc', she was retired. Noblesse was named Champion three-year-old filly for 1963. Timeform summed her career up as follows:

"The 'sixties saw some lowly-rated Oaks winners but the 1963 winner was one of the best. Noblesse (rated 133) beat her Oaks field by the staggering margin of ten lengths, her fourth race and fourth win....Noblesse is a small, rather lightly-made filly, long and low, strongest behind the saddle, no beauty to look at, except when she is galloping; her action is fluent and effortless, and she has a perfect temperament for racing. She had only five races in her career, but she was not a robust filly, and even if she had kept fit, a more severe programme might have been to her detriment. In the first four of her races she hardly needed to gallop seriously for more than fifty yards, but she won all of them by a wide margin, and her turn of foot was something to marvel at."

== Breeding record ==
Noblesse retired to stud in America and was a very successful broodmare. She had 5 foals before her death in 1972 and all five won races, two of them being stakes winners whilst all of them were stakes placed. Her final foal, Where You Lead (by Raise A Native), emulated her mother by winning the Musidora Stakes at York and finished second in the Oaks at Epsom behind the 1,000 Guineas winner, Mysterious. As a broodmare, Where You Lead produced winners including Slightly Dangerous (by Roberto), a graded winner who also finished second in the Oaks. She in turn produced English and Irish Derby winner Commander in Chief (by Dancing Brave), Champion 2-y-o & 3-y-o colt Warning (by Known Fact) as well as seven other foals who won or were placed in stakes races. Where You Lead also bred I Will Follow (by Herbager), a stakes winner in France who bred the Prix de l'Arc de Triomphe and Coronation Cup winner Rainbow Quest (by Blushing Groom), himself a leading sire.

Noblesse's name appears in the pedigrees of numerous top-class racehorses today. The Noblesse Stakes, a Group 3 race for fillies and mares which is run every year over one-and-a-half miles at Cork racecourse, is named in her honor.

== See also ==
- Noblesse Stakes
