= Tentam =

American-bred Thoroughbred racehorse

- Sire: Intentionally
- Grandsire: Intent
- Dam: Tamerett
- Damsire: Tim Tam
- Sex: Stallion
- Foaled: 1969
- Country: United States
- Colour: Dark Bay/Brown
- Owner: 1) Cragwood Stables; 2) E. P. Taylor (9/73)
- Trainer: MacKenzie Miller
- Record: 31: 11-6-6
- Earnings: US$459,109

Major wins
- Boardwalk Handicap (1972); Jim Dandy Stakes (1972); Metropolitan Handicap (1973); Toboggan Handicap (1973); Bernard Baruch Handicap (1973); United Nations Handicap (1973); Governor Stakes (1973)

Tentam (1969–1981) was an American Thoroughbred racehorse.

== Racing career ==
Owned by Charles W. Engelhard Jr., who raced him under his Cragwood Stables nom de course, Tentam won Grade 1 races and on August 11, 1973, set a world record for one and one eight miles on turf in winning the Bernard Baruch Handicap at Saratoga Race Course. He was then sold for $2 million in September to E. P. Taylor whose Windfields Farm owned the supersire Northern Dancer. E. P. Taylor purchased Tentam, a descendant of Man o' War, for breeding purposes but raced him for the remainder of 1973 before syndicating him and sending him to stand at his stud farm.

== Stud record ==
Tentham met with reasonable success as a sire. Some of the best known among his progeny were Ten Gold Pots, the 1985 Sovereign Award for Canadian Champion Older Horse, and the filly, La Voyageuse, winner of three Canadian Sovereign Awards.
