= Real Shadai =

American-bred Thoroughbred racehorse

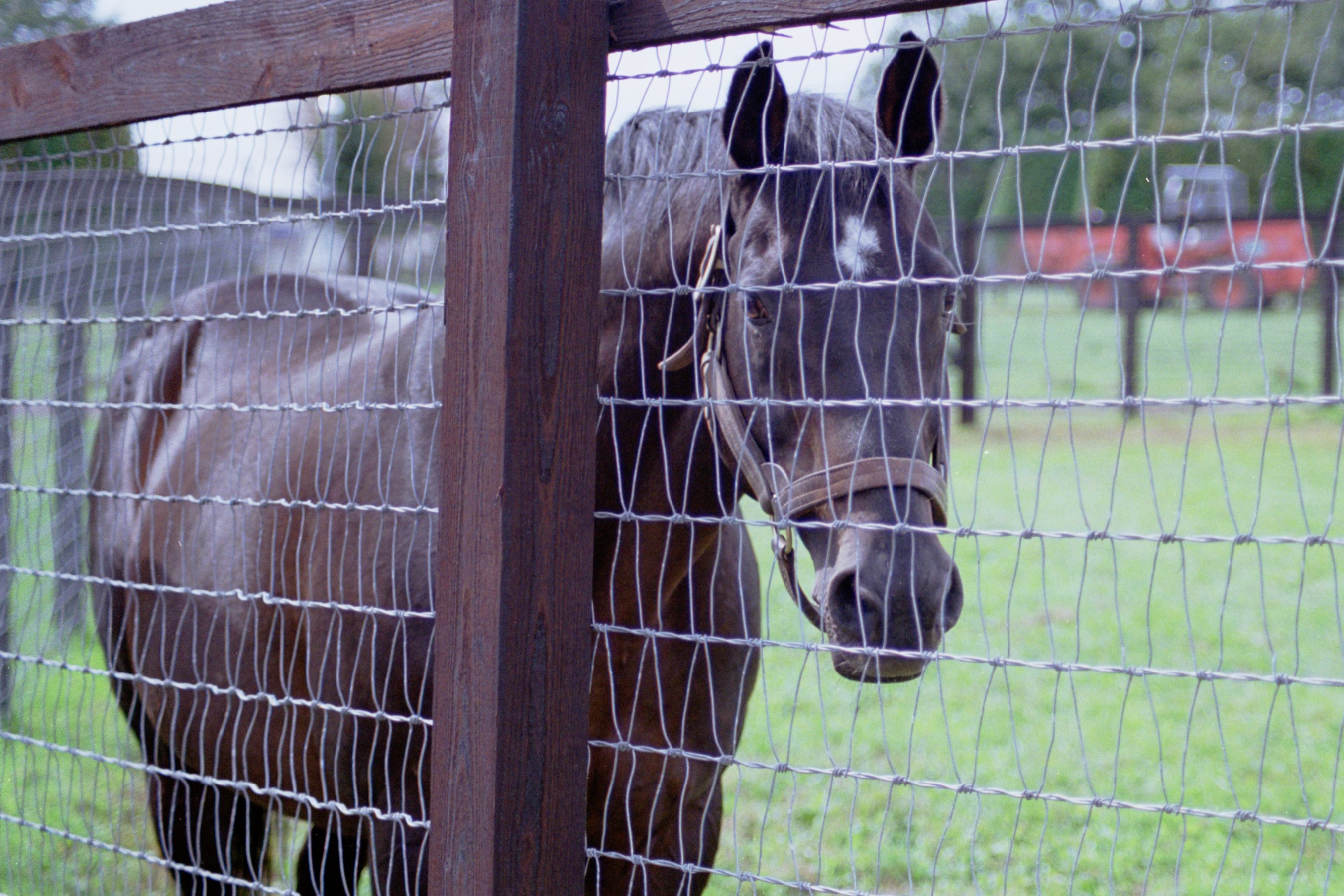
- Real Shadai at Shadai Stallion Station in 2000.
- Breed: Thoroughbred
- Sire: Roberto
- Grandsire: Hail To Reason
- Dam: Desert Vixen
- Damsire: In Reality
- Sex: Stallion
- Foaled: 1979
- Died: May 26, 2004 (aged 25)
- Country: United States
- Colour: Bay
- Breeder: North Ridge Farm
- Owner: Zenya Yoshida
- Trainer: John Cunnington, Jr.
- Record: 8:2-2-2
- Earnings: F911,400

Major wins
- Grand Prix de Deauville (1982)

Awards
- Leading sire in Japan (1993)
- Last updated on June 18, 2007

Real Shadai (1979–2004) was an American-born Thoroughbred racehorse who raced in France and became a leading sire in Japan.

== Background ==
He was sired by Epsom Derby winner Roberto out of the U.S. Racing Hall of Fame mare Desert Vixen.

Real Shadai was bred by Franklin Groves' North Ridge Farm near Lexington, Kentucky, and sold at the 1980 Keeneland July yearling sale for $360,000 to the renowned Japanese horseman Zenya Yoshida. As he had done before with his Champion colt Northern Taste, Yoshida turned Real Shadai over to trainer John Cunnington, Jr. at the Great Stables in Chantilly.

== Racing career ==
In 1981, Real Shadai was a non-winner in his two starts at age two. Out of his six races the following year, he won two, the most important of which was the 1982 Grand Prix de Deauville. His other significant outing was a second-place finish in the 1982 GI Prix du Jockey Club to Robert Sangster's colt Assert.

In 1982, Shadai entered the “Prix de l'Arc de Triomphe”, and was up against a strong field that included the horses known as Assert, Ardross, April Run, Akiyda, and, All Along. After finishing fifth in the race, Real Shadai was retired from racing.

== Stud record ==
Sent to stand at stud at his owner's Shadai Stallion Station in Shiraoi, Hokkaido, Real Shadai had a successful career as a stallion. He was the leading sire in Japan in 1993, and his progeny earned in excess of US$110 million. Among his notable offspring were Shadai Kagura, Japan's Champion Three-Year-Old Filly in 1989 and winner of the Oka Sho (Japanese 1000 Guineas), as well as Rice Shower, who captured the 1992 Domestic Grade I Kikuka Sho (Japanese St. Leger) and was a two-time winner of the Domestic Grade I Tenno Sho (Spring) (1993, 1995).

Pensioned in 2000, Real Shadai became afflicted with hyposthenia, brought on by laminitis, and died at the age of twenty-five on May 26, 2004.
