= Noblesse Stakes =

Flat horse race in Ireland

Noblesse Stakes
2026
Moody	Snapretend	Elana Osario

Previous years
2025
Bubble Gum	Ameerat Jumaira	Goodie Two Shoes
2024
Thunder Roll	Sumiha	Trevaunance
2023
Moracana	Irish Lullaby	Annerville
2022
Thunder Kiss	Annerville	Pineapple Express
2021
Moll	Flor De La Luna	Yaxeni

2020-2015
2020
Heliac	Fresnel	Loveisthehigherlaw
2019
Cimeara	Who's Steph	Warnaq
2018
Bloomfield	Glamorous Approach	Clear Skies
2017
Zhukova	Island Remede	Glamorous Approach
2016
Altesse	Ballybacka Queen	Island Remede
2015
Massinga	Altesse	Toe The Line

The Noblesse Stakes is a Listed flat horse race in Ireland open to mares and fillies aged four years or older. It is run at Cork over a distance of 1 mile and 4 furlongs (2,413 metres), and it is scheduled to take place each year in early April.

The race was first run in 2015 and the first two runnings were held Leopardstown. Until 2013 the title was used for a race now known as the Munster Oaks.

== Records ==
Leading jockey (3 wins):

- Billy Lee - Bloomfield (2018), Moll (2021), Bubble Gum (2025)

Leading trainer (3 wins):

- Paddy Twomey - Moll (2021), Bubble Gum (2025), Moody (2026)

== Winners ==
Year	Winner	Age	Jockey	Trainer	Time
2015	Massinga	4	Pat Smullen	Dermot Weld	2:52.37
2016	Altesse	5	Kevin Manning	Jim Bolger	2:56.79
2017	Zhukova	5	Pat Smullen	Dermot Weld	2:41.44
2018	Bloomfield	4	Billy Lee	Willie McCreery	3:17.48
2019	Cimeara	4	Donnacha O'Brien	Joseph O'Brien	2:46.19
2020	Heliac (Note: The 2020 race was run in June due to the COVID-19 pandemic in the Republic of Ireland)	4	Colin Keane	Ger Lyons	2:37.37
2021	Moll	4	Billy Lee	Paddy Twomey	2:43.97
2022	Thunder Kiss	5	Colin Keane	Ger Lyons	2:42.73
2023	Moracana	5	Robbie Colgan	Sheila Lavery	2:44.43
2024	Thunder Roll	4	Dylan Browne McMonagle	Joseph O'Brien	2:42.43
2025	Bubble Gum	4	Billy Lee	Paddy Twomey	2:32.71
2026	Moody	4	Colin Keane	Paddy Twomey	2:51.60

== See also ==
- Horse racing in Ireland
- List of Irish flat horse races
