= Known Fact =

American-bred Thoroughbred racehorse (1977–2000)

- Sire: In Reality
- Grandsire: Intentionally
- Dam: Tamerett
- Damsire: Tim Tam
- Sex: Stallion
- Foaled: 1977
- Country: United States
- Colour: Black
- Breeder: Dr. W. O. Reed
- Owner: Juddmonte Farms
- Record: 11: 6-1-1
- Earnings: $1,505,640

Major wins
- Middle Park Stakes (1979); Two Thousand Guineas Stakes (1980); Park Stakes (1980); Crystal Mile (1980); Queen Elizabeth II Stakes (1980)

Awards
- English Champion Miler (1980); Timeform rating: 135 (1980)
- Last updated on 16 November 2026

Known Fact (17 March 1977 – 12 July 2000) was an American-bred, British-trained racehorse and sire. He was the leading British miler of 1980, being awarded the 2000 Guineas on the disqualification of Nureyev and defeating Kris to win the QEII. He had some success as a stallion.

== Background ==
Known Fact was by sire of sires In Reality and out of a Tim Tam mare named Tamerett who also produced Secrettame, the dam of the champion sire Gone West. Known Fact also has a half-brother, Tentam, who won many notable US stakes like the United Nations Stakes and the Metropolitan Handicap.

== Race career ==
Known Fact started his two-year-old season with a second place in the Mill Reef Stakes and a win in the William Hill Middle Park Stakes. He then moved into his three-year-old year with victory in the 2000 Guineas and QEII. Known Fact was voted Champion Miler in England at the end of his third year, being rated highly at 135 by Timeform, and he was retired to stand at Juddmonte Farms in Kentucky.

== Stud career ==
Known Fact was the first stallion to stand at Prince Khalid Abdullah's North American division of Juddmonte Farms. Known Fact sired around 25 stakes winners and his last standing fee was US$10,000 before he died in 2000 at the age of 23 after covering only 20 mares.

Sire of:

- Markofdistinction - European Champion Older Miler, Sire in Japan
- Warning - Winner of Gr. 1 Sussex Stakes and Gr. 1 Queen Elizabeth II Stakes
- Bold Fact - Winner of Gr. 1 Nunthorpe Stakes
- So Factual - Winner of Gr. 1 Nunthorpe Stakes
- Proud Fact – Winner of Prix Ceres

Damsire of:

- Banshee Breeze – US Champion Three Year Old Filly
- Overarching – South African Horse of the Season (2005)
- Naughty New Yorker – Winner of Gr. 2 Red Smith Handicap
- High Limit – Winner of Gr.2 Louisiana Derby
- Brilliant – Winner of Gr.2 Jefferson Cup

== Sire line tree ==
- Known Fact
  - Warning
    - Averti
      - Avonbridge
        - Iver Bridge Lad
        - Temple Meads
        - Blaine
    - Piccolo
      - Helter Skelter
      - Picaday
      - Picardi Run
      - Winker Watson
      - Flying Blue
      - Temple of Boom
      - Tiddliwinks
      - Poyle Vinnie
    - Annus Mirabillis
    - Bishop of Cashel
    - Charnwood Forest
      - Firebreak
    - Decorated Hero
    - Diktat
      - Formal Decree
      - Definightly
      - Skins Game
      - Dream Ahead
        - Donjuan Triumphant
        - Al Wukair
        - Dream of Dreams
        - Sensei
      - First Selection
    - Little Rock
    - Danger Over
    - Give Notice
    - Calstone Light O
  - Markofdistinction
    - Hokkai Rousseau
  - So Factual
    - Ialysos
  - Bold Fact
