= Warning (British horse) =

British-bred Thoroughbred racehorse

- Racing colours of Khalid Abdullah
- Sire: Known Fact
- Grandsire: In Reality
- Dam: Slightly Dangerous
- Damsire: Roberto
- Sex: Stallion
- Foaled: 13 April 1985
- Country: United States
- Colour: Dark Bay or Brown
- Breeder: Juddmonte Farms
- Owner: Khalid Abdulla
- Trainer: Guy Harwood
- Record: 14:8-3-0

Major wins
- Richmond Stakes (1987); Champagne Stakes (1987); Bet With The Tote Trophy (1988); Sussex Stakes (1988); Queen Elizabeth II Stakes (1988); Queen Anne Stakes (1989)

Awards
- Top-rated European two-year-old colt (1987); Timeform top-rated two-year-old (1987); Top-rated European horse (1988); Timeform top-rated horse and Horse of the Year(1988); Timeform rating 136

Warning (13 April 1985 – 27 December 2000) was a British Thoroughbred racehorse and sire. He was the leading two-year-old colt in Europe in 1987 when he was unbeaten in four races including the Richmond Stakes and the Champagne Stakes. As a three-year-old he missed the British Classic Races but proved himself to be an outstanding specialist miler, winning the Sussex Stakes and the Queen Elizabeth II Stakes. He was less successful in 1989, but added a win in the Queen Anne Stakes. He was retired to stud at the end of that year and became a successful sire of winners in Britain and Japan.

== Background ==
Warning was a dark bay or brown horse with a narrow white stripe and a white sock on his left hind leg bred by Juddmonte Farms, the breeding organisation of his owner Khalid Abdulla. The colt raced in Abdulla's green, pink and white racing silks and was trained at Pulborough, West Sussex by Guy Harwood. Warning was ridden in all his races by the Irish jockey Pat Eddery.

He was sired by the 2000 Guineas and Queen Elizabeth II Stakes winner Known Fact and thus was a male-line descendant of the Godolphin Arabian, unlike more than 95% of modern thoroughbreds, who trace their ancestry to the Darley Arabian. Warning's dam Slightly Dangerous finished second in the 1982 Epsom Oaks and later became an outstanding broodmare. Apart from Warning she produced The Derby winner Commander in Chief, the Derby runner-up Dushyantor, the Irish Derby runner-up Deploy and the Flower Bowl Invitational Stakes winner Yashmak. She was also a sister of I Will Follow, the dam of the Prix de l'Arc de Triomphe winner Rainbow Quest.

== Racing career ==
=== 1987: two-year-old season ===
Warning was undefeated in four races as a two-year-old in 1987. After two wins in minor races he was moved up in class for the Group Two Richmond Stakes at Goodwood Racecourse and won at odds of 4/11 from Bellefella and Lapierre (a colt which later won the Group One Prix Jean Prat). In September at Doncaster Racecourse, Warning won the Champagne Stakes, beating the Coventry Stakes winner Always Fair. Warning was scheduled to end his season by meeting another unbeaten colt, Reprimand, in the Group One Dewhurst Stakes at Newmarket in October, but was withdrawn from the race as Harwood felt he would be unsuited by the soft ground. The race was subsequently abandoned as a result of damage caused by the Great Storm of 1987.

=== 1988: three-year-old season ===
Warning was the early favourite for the 2000 Guineas but in his prep race he was beaten four lengths by Doyoun in the Craven Stakes at Newmarket. Shortly after this race the colt was found to be sick and was withdrawn from the Guineas.

Warning did not appear until July when he ran in the Bet With The Tote Trophy, a Listed race over one mile at Lingfield Park. He started the 4/9 favourite, took the lead inside the final furlong and won by half a length from Salse. The runner-up went on to win five Group races including the Prix de la Forêt. In July, Warning was matched against older horses in the Group One Sussex Stakes at Goodwood. Eddery restrained the colt in the early stages before challenging in the straight. He finished strongly to win from the five-year-old Then Again and the four-year-old Most Welcome. Two and a half weeks later, Warning was sent to France to contest the Prix Jacques Le Marois at Deauville Racecourse. Despite having "every chance" in the closing stages, he was beaten a length by the Breeders' Cup Mile winner Miesque at weight-for-age terms with the July Cup winner Soviet Star in fourth.

In the Queen Elizabeth II Stakes at Ascot Racecourse on 24 September, Warning started 9/4 joint-favourite with Soviet Star, who had defeated Miesque in the Prix du Moulin. The field also included Persian Heights (St James's Palace Stakes), Magic of Life (Coronation Stakes), Prince Rupert (Waterford Crystal Mile) and Indian Ridge (Jersey Stakes). Warning turned into the straight in sixth place but accelerated to take the lead a furlong from the finish and drew clear of the field to win "very easily" by five lengths. On his final appearance of the season, Warning was sent to the United States for the Breeders Cup Mile at Churchill Downs. He started the 19/10 favourite but was never in contention and finished tenth of the eleven runners, more than 25 lengths behind the winner Miesque.

=== 1989: four-year-old season ===
Warning remained in training at four, but won only one of his four races. On his seasonal debut he started 8/15 favourite for the Lockinge Stakes at Newbury, but was beaten two lengths by Most Welcome. At Royal Ascot in June he appeared to recover his best form in the Queen Anne Stakes, taking the lead approaching the final furlong and accelerating clear to win by four lengths from Reprimand. In July he was moved up to middle distances for the only time for the Eclipse Stakes at Sandown. He started second favourite but tired badly in the closing stages and finished fourth behind Nashwan, Opening Verse and Indian Skimmer. On his final appearance he was made favourite for a second win in the Sussex Stakes, but finished sixth of the nine runners behind the three-year-old Zilzal. Warning was being prepared for another attempt at the Breeders' Cup Mile when his career was ended by injury.

== Assessment ==
In 1987 Warning was the top-rated two-year-old colt in Europe's official International Classification with a rating of 125, placing him equal with the filly Ravinella. The independent Timeform organisation concurred, making him their highest-rated two-year-old of either sex with a rating of 127p (the "p" indicated that they felt the colt likely to improve on his rating).

In the following year the colt was officially Europe's best horse, with a rating of 133 placing him one pound ahead of Miesque and two ahead of the leading middle-distance horses Mtoto and Tony Bin. Following a "recalibration" of historic ratings in 2013, the ratings of all horses in the 1988 classification were moved down by one pound, giving Warning a new official rating of 132. Timeform assigned a rating of 136 to Warning in 1988, making him their highest-rated horse of the year.

In their book A Century of Champions, based on a modified version of the Timeform system, John Randall and Tony Morris rated Warning the best British-trained racehorse of his generation.

Pat Eddery described Warning as "a brilliant horse" and an "absolutely top miler" adding that he was "a lovely little fellow, not very big but a gentleman".

== Stud record ==
Warning was based at the Banstead Manor Stud and proved to be a successful breeding stallion, particularly as a sire of sprinters. The best of his progeny included Diktat, Piccolo, Give Notice, Charnwood Forest (Queen Anne Stakes), Decorated Hero (Challenge Stakes) and Annus Mirabilis (Dubai Duty Free).

He was exported to Japan in 1996, where the most successful of his runners were Calstone Light O, winner of the 2004 Sprinters Stakes and Sunningdale, winner of the 2004 Takamatsunomiya Kinen. Warning died of heart failure at the Shizunai Stallion Station on 27 December 2000.

== Sire line tree ==
- Warning
  - Averti
    - Avonbridge
      - Iver Bridge Lad
      - Temple Meads
      - Blaine
  - Piccolo
    - Helter Skelter
    - Picaday
    - Picardi Run
    - Winker Watson
    - Flying Blue
    - Temple of Boom
    - Tiddliwinks
    - Poyle Vinnie
  - Annus Mirabillis
  - Bishop of Cashel
  - Charnwood Forest
    - Firebreak
  - Decorated Hero
  - Diktat
    - Formal Decree
    - Definightly
    - Skins Game
    - Dream Ahead
      - Donjuan Triumphant
      - Al Wukair
      - Dream of Dreams
      - Sensei
    - First Selection
  - Little Rock
  - Danger Over
  - Give Notice
  - Calstone Light O
  - Sunningdale

== Pedigree ==
Pedigree of Warning (GB), dark bay or brown stallion, 1985
Sire Known Fact (USA)	In Reality (USA)	Intentionally	Intent
Sire Known Fact (USA)	In Reality (USA)	Intentionally	My Recipe
Sire Known Fact (USA)	In Reality (USA)	My Dear Girl	Rough'n Tumble
Sire Known Fact (USA)	In Reality (USA)	My Dear Girl	Iltis
Sire Known Fact (USA)	Tamerett (USA)	Tim Tam	Tom Fool
Sire Known Fact (USA)	Tamerett (USA)	Tim Tam	Two Lea
Sire Known Fact (USA)	Tamerett (USA)	Mixed Marriage	Tudor Minstrel
Sire Known Fact (USA)	Tamerett (USA)	Mixed Marriage	Persian Maid
Dam Slightly Dangerous (USA)	Roberto (USA)	Hail To Reason	Turn-To
Dam Slightly Dangerous (USA)	Roberto (USA)	Hail To Reason	Nothirdchance
Dam Slightly Dangerous (USA)	Roberto (USA)	Bramalea	Nashua
Dam Slightly Dangerous (USA)	Roberto (USA)	Bramalea	Rarelea
Dam Slightly Dangerous (USA)	Where You Lead (USA)	Raise a Native	Native Dancer
Dam Slightly Dangerous (USA)	Where You Lead (USA)	Raise a Native	Raise You
Dam Slightly Dangerous (USA)	Where You Lead (USA)	Noblesse	Mossborough
Dam Slightly Dangerous (USA)	Where You Lead (USA)	Noblesse	Duke's Delight (Family: 14-f)
