= Roberto (horse) =

American-bred, Irish Thoroughbred racehorse

- Racing silks of John W. Galbreath
- Breed: Thoroughbred
- Sire: Hail To Reason
- Grandsire: Turn-To
- Dam: Bramalea
- Damsire: Nashua
- Sex: Stallion
- Foaled: 1969
- Country: United States
- Colour: Bay
- Breeder: John W. Galbreath
- Owner: John W. Galbreath
- Trainer: Vincent O'Brien
- Record: 14: 7-3-0
- Earnings: $339,902

Major wins
- National Stakes (1971); Anglesey Stakes (1971); Epsom Derby (1972); Benson & Hedges Gold Cup (1972); Vauxhall Trial Stakes (1972); Coronation Cup (1973)

Awards
- Champion 2-Year-Old Colt in Ireland (1971); Champion 3-year-old colt in Ireland (1972); Champion 3-year-old colt in England (1972)

Honours
- Timeform rating: 131

Roberto (16 March 1969 – 2 August 1988) was an American-bred, Irish-trained Thoroughbred racehorse. In a career that lasted from 1971 until July 1973, he ran fourteen times and won seven races. He was the best Irish two-year-old of 1971, when his victories included the National Stakes. As a three-year-old, he won the Derby before recording a famous victory over Brigadier Gerard in the inaugural running of the Benson and Hedges Gold Cup. This is regarded by many experts to have been one of the greatest ever performances on a European racecourse. He won the Coronation Cup as a four-year-old before being retired to stud. Roberto had fragile knees and required a left-handed track to perform to his best; he never won going right-handed. He was described by Lester Piggott as " a champion when things were in his favour". Roberto also proved to be a highly successful and influential stallion.

== Background ==
Roberto was a bay horse with a white blaze bred by John W. Galbreath at his Darby Dan Farm in Lexington, Kentucky. He was a son of the successful sire Hail To Reason out of the mare Bramalea, winner of the CCA Oaks in 1962. Roberto's grandsire was Turn-To, a descendant of Nearco, and his damsire was U.S. Hall of Famer Nashua. He was named for Major League Baseball star Roberto Clemente by his owner John Galbreath who also owned the Pittsburgh Pirates baseball team.

Galbreath sent the colt to be trained in Ireland by Vincent O'Brien.

== Racing career ==
=== 1971: two-year-old season ===
Roberto made his debut in the Lagan Stakes in July 1971 at the Curragh Racecourse. He won impressively and then contested the Anglesey Stakes also at the Curragh which he won easily. He returned to win the National Stakes over the same course, drawing comparisons to Nijinsky. He was then sent to France to contest the Grand Critérium at Longchamp Racecourse and finished fourth behind Hard To Beat.

=== 1972: three-year-old season ===
At age three, Roberto began his season by winning the Vauxhall Trial Stakes at Phoenix Park Racecourse and was then sent to England to contest the Classic 2000 Guineas at Newmarket. He was held up in the early stages but stayed on strongly to finish second by half a length to High Top, with the pair finishing six lengths clear of the other runners. Roberto had been ridden in the 2000 Guineas by the Australian jockey Bill Williamson. Williamson sustained a shoulder injury in a fall at Kempton Park Racecourse ten days before the Epsom Derby and after a slow recovery such that he was not able to ride before Derby Day, he was replaced by Lester Piggott.

=== Epsom Derby ===
Roberto started the 3/1 favourite for the Derby in a field of twenty-two runners. He and outsider Rheingold battled neck and neck from a furlong and a half out after Pentland Firth was squeezed a little for room and dropped away. Rheingold was marginally ahead until the very last stride. when Piggott edged Roberto home on the rails. Piggott actually thought he had been beaten, while Rheingold's jockey, Ernie Johnson, said afterwards that the winning post had come one stride too late for his horse. In a virtual dead heat, Roberto got up to win by the shortest of short heads. Piggott stated that if he had been beaten he was sure that he would have been awarded the race as Rheingold was leaning on him throughout the final furlong. He also reported that Roberto "wasn't doing much for me"; it is remarkable that despite Roberto's lack of commitment he was still able to win as Rheingold was an exceptional colt who would subsequently win the Grand Prix de Saint-Cloud (twice), a Prix Ganay, and a Prix de l'Arc de Triomphe. The Derby victory, confirmed after a stewards' enquiry, was poorly received by the crowd, many of whom felt that Williamson had been unfairly deprived of the ride. The win made John Galbreath the first person to own winners of both the English and American Derbys, since he had also won the 1963 Kentucky Derby with Chateaugay and the 1967 Kentucky Derby with Proud Clarion. Roberto returned to Ireland for the Irish Derby but produced a dismal performance at The Curragh, a right-handed track, and finished twelfth of the fourteen runners behind Steel Pulse.

=== Benson & Hedges Gold Cup ===
In the inaugural edition of the Benson & Hedges Gold Cup in 1972, many racing observers believed that Derby runner up, Rheingold, would prove to be a better horse than Roberto – he had subsequently won the Grand Prix de St Cloud while Roberto had run poorly in the Irish Derby. Leading jockey Lester Piggott abandoned Roberto to ride Rheingold. However, most interest focused on the four-year-old Brigadier Gerard whose presence generated enormous publicity for the race. Undefeated in fifteen career starts, Brigadier Gerard was seen as invincible. Having lost jockey Piggott, and with the first-choice reserve Williamson committed to riding in Belgium. Vincent O'Brien took the advice of Roberto's owner John Galbreath, and flew in the Panamanian-born American jockey Braulio Baeza. Riding for the first time on an English racetrack, according to 'Raceform', a leading publisher of U.K. horseracing information, "Braulio Baeza aboard Roberto was out of the stalls like a bat out of hell." After disputing the lead with Bright Beam (entered in the race as a pacemaker for the absent Mill Reef) he opened up a clear advantage approaching the straight. With Rheingold struggling, Brigadier Gerard emerged as Roberto's only serious challenger but after getting to within a length of the Derby winner the favourite could make no further progress. Roberto drew away in the final furlong to win by three lengths from Brigadier Gerard in a new course record time. Baeza commented later “When Brigadier Gerard came to me, I had plenty of horse left. Nice and handy. So when I set him down, he just pulled away”. Brigadier Gerard finished officially 10 lengths ahead of the third horse, Gold Rod, which indicated that he had run up to his best form, however examination of the race film replay showed, and the Brigadier's owner, John Hislop, later acknowledged, that the distance between the second and third was in fact 17 lengths, indicating that Brigadier Gerard, who also broke the course record, may have run his best ever race in defeat. Vincent O’Brien had briefed Baeza about Roberto, the other horses in the race and also about the track but left the tactics to the jockey. As Baeza reported later “Vincent O’Brien didn’t give me any instructions. He just said ‘you’re the rider, do what you think is best’, though he did say that if the pace was strong it would find out Brigadier Gerard in the last half-mile and he was right.”

Roberto ran in two more races in the autumn of 1972 but failed to reproduce his York form. At Longchamp in September, he finished a length second to Hard To Beat in the Prix Niel. A month later over the same course and distance, he finished seventh behind San San in the Prix de l'Arc de Triomphe.

=== 1973: four-year-old season ===
As a four-year-old, Roberto was sent to France to contest the Prix Ganay but was withdrawn from the race owing to injury. He then returned to Ireland, where he finished second to Ballymore in the Nijinsky Stakes. In June, he recorded his only success of the season when, ridden by Piggott, he easily beat the 1972 Yorkshire Oaks and 1973 Geoffrey Freer Stakes and Doncaster Cup winner, Attica Meli, by five lengths in record time in the Coronation Cup. He was a late withdrawal from the Eclipse Stakes due to heavy ground and then finished eleventh of the twelve runners behind Dahlia in the King George VI and Queen Elizabeth Stakes, clearly not liking the right-handed Ascot track. He was a late withdrawal from the Benson and Hedges Gold Cup at York because of heavy ground. He then pulled a ligament in training and was retired.

== Stud career ==
Retired to stand at stud at Darby Dan Farm in Kentucky, Roberto became a successful sire of international influence, with several of his sons going on to be successful sires themselves. Among his notable offspring were 1988 Eclipse Award turf champion Sunshine Forever; 1977 Irish Champion 2-y-o filly (joint) and Cheveley Park Stakes winner Sookera; Real Shadai, the leading sire in Japan in 1993; Brian's Time who sired 1994 Japanese Triple Crown winner and voted Japanese Horse of the Year, Narita Brian; Australian Melbourne Cup winner At Talaq; British Classic (and Irish classic) winner Touching Wood; outstanding sire Kris S, who produced five Breeders' Cup winners; leading European miler and successful American turf sire, Lear Fan; and Dynaformer who sired 2006 Kentucky Derby winner Barbaro.

Roberto died on August 2, 1988, at Darby Dan Farm and is buried in their equine cemetery.

== Pedigree ==
Pedigree of Roberto, Bay stallion
Sire Hail To Reason	Turn-to	Royal Charger	Nearco
Sire Hail To Reason	Turn-to	Royal Charger	Sun Princess
Sire Hail To Reason	Turn-to	Source Sucree	Admiral Drake
Sire Hail To Reason	Turn-to	Source Sucree	Lavendula
Sire Hail To Reason	Nothirdchance	Blue Swords	Blue Larkspur
Sire Hail To Reason	Nothirdchance	Blue Swords	Flaming Swords
Sire Hail To Reason	Nothirdchance	Galla Colors	Sir Gallahad III
Sire Hail To Reason	Nothirdchance	Galla Colors	Rouge et Noir
Dam Bramalea	Nashua	Nasrullah	Nearco
Dam Bramalea	Nashua	Nasrullah	Mumtaz Begum
Dam Bramalea	Nashua	Segula	Johnstown
Dam Bramalea	Nashua	Segula	Sekhmet
Dam Bramalea	Rarelea	Bull Lea	Bull Dog
Dam Bramalea	Rarelea	Bull Lea	Rose Leaves
Dam Bramalea	Rarelea	Bleebok	Blue Larkspur
Dam Bramalea	Rarelea	Bleebok	Forteresse (Family 12-c)
