= Natalma =

American-bred Thoroughbred racehorse

- Sire: Native Dancer
- Grandsire: Polynesian
- Dam: Almahmoud
- Damsire: Mahmoud
- Sex: Mare
- Foaled: 26 March 1957
- Died: 29 January 1985 (aged 27)
- Country: United States
- Colour: Bay
- Breeder: Mrs. E. H. Augustus & Daniel G. Van Clief
- Owner: E. P. Taylor
- Trainer: Horatio Luro
- Record: 7: 3–0–2
- Earnings: US$16,015

Honours
- Natalma Stakes at Woodbine Racetrack; Canadian Horse Racing Hall of Fame (2007)

Natalma (March 26, 1957 – January 29, 1985) was an American-bred Thoroughbred racehorse best known as the dam (mother) of the most important sire, and sire of sires, of the late 20th Century, Northern Dancer. She also established a highly influential female family, which has produced other leading sires Machiavellian and Danehill, plus numerous other stakes winners. Natalma was inducted into the Canadian Horse Racing Hall of Fame in 2007.

== Background ==
Bred in Virginia by Mrs. E. H. Augustus & Daniel G. Van Clief, Natalma was purchased by Canadian business mogul E. P. Taylor at the Saratoga, New York, yearling sales for $35,000 (equivalent to $390,000 in 2025). This was the second-highest price for a filly at that year's sale, a reflection of Natalma's excellent breeding. Her sire was the great Native Dancer, and her dam was the highly influential Almahmoud. In addition to Natalma, Almahmoud also produced Cosmah, the 1974 Kentucky Broodmare of the Year, and Bubbling Beauty. Natalma, Cosmah and Bubbling Beauty all produced leading sires: Northern Dancer, Halo and Arctic Tern respectively. The family descends from the excellent racehorse and notable broodmare Mother Goose.

== Racing career ==
Natalma was trained by Horatio Luro, who would later train Northern Dancer as well. At age two, she won two of her five starts. She also crossed the finish line first in the 1959 Spinaway Stakes but swerved when jockey Bobby Ussery hit her with the whip and was disqualified to third place for interference. The experience so soured Natalma on racing that it was several months before Luro was able to return her to the racetrack.

Natalma made her three-year-old debut on April 9, 1960, at Keeneland where she briefly led but then faded to tenth. Two weeks later, she won in what would prove her final race. While in training for the Kentucky Oaks, she was found to have bone chips in the right knee. She was given some time off to recover, then went back into training for the Coaching Club American Oaks. However, the bone chips recurred, which led to her retirement.

== Breeding record ==
Although late in the breeding season, she was sent to Taylor's Windfields Farm in Oshawa, Ontario, Canada to be bred to Nearctic. Coincidentally, Nearctic had won the Michigan Mile just days before the 1958 Saratoga Sales, and the winnings from this race gave Taylor the funds to pay for Natalma. Natalma was bred to Nearctic on June 28, 1960, as the last mate of his first crop. That late pairing resulted in Northern Dancer being born on May 27, 1961. As a racehorse, Northern Dancer was a champion in both Canada and the United States whose major wins included the Kentucky Derby, Preakness Stakes and Queen's Plate. He achieved even greater fame by becoming a leading sire in both North America and Europe, and went on to become an outstanding sire of sires.

Natalma was bred to Nearctic several additional times, producing Arctic Dancer (dam of La Prevoyante), Northern Ace, Northern Native, Transatlantic and two unnamed fillies who died before age 2. Additionally, she produced stakes winners Native Victor, Regal Dancer and Born A Lady with other stallions.

Natalma's daughters have further extended her influence on Thoroughbred bloodlines worldwide. Raise the Standard, by Hoist the Flag, founded a strong branch of the family in France, from which descended important sire Machiavellian and classic winners Bluemamba and Senga, among many other stakes winners. Another daughter, Spring Adieu by Buckpasser, was the second dam of nine stakes winners, including leading sire Danehill. Danehill was inbred to Natalma since he also descended from her through Northern Dancer. Other horses inbred to Natalma include the undefeated champion Frankel, Australian champion and World recordholder of the most Group 1 wins (25) Winx and Kentucky Derby winner Street Sense.

Natalma was humanely euthanized on January 29, 1985, at the Windfields Farm satellite operation in Maryland (now the Northview Stallion Station) after unsuccessful treatment for colic. She was buried in the farm's equine cemetery.

== Honors ==
In 2007, Natalma's contribution to the sport of Thoroughbred horse racing was recognized through her induction in the Canadian Horse Racing Hall of Fame. The Natalma Stakes for two-year-old fillies, run over the E.P. Taylor turf course at Woodbine, is named in her honour.

== Pedigree ==
Pedigree of Natalma, bay mare, foaled March 26, 1957 in Virginia
Sire Native Dancer	Polynesian	Unbreakable	Sickle
Sire Native Dancer	Polynesian	Unbreakable	Blue Grass
Sire Native Dancer	Polynesian	Black Polly	Polymelian
Sire Native Dancer	Polynesian	Black Polly	Black Queen
Sire Native Dancer	Geisha	Discovery	Display
Sire Native Dancer	Geisha	Discovery	Ariadne
Sire Native Dancer	Geisha	Miyako	John P. Grier
Sire Native Dancer	Geisha	Miyako	La Chica
Dam Almahmoud	Mahmoud	Blenheim	Blandford
Dam Almahmoud	Mahmoud	Blenheim	Malva
Dam Almahmoud	Mahmoud	Mah Mahal	Gainsborough
Dam Almahmoud	Mahmoud	Mah Mahal	Mumtaz Mahal
Dam Almahmoud	Arbitrator	Peace Chance	Chance Shot
Dam Almahmoud	Arbitrator	Peace Chance	Peace
Dam Almahmoud	Arbitrator	Mother Goose	Chicle
Dam Almahmoud	Arbitrator	Mother Goose	Flying Witch (Family 2-d)

Natalma is inbred 5 × 5 to Fair Play, meaning Fair Play appears twice in the fifth generation of her pedigree.
