= Gunrock =

American mascot

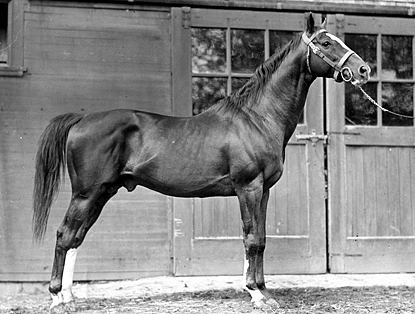
- Sire: Rock Sand
- Grandsire: Sainfoin
- Dam: Gunfire
- Damsire: Hastings
- Sex: Stallion
- Foaled: 1914
- Country: United States
- Colour: Chestnut
- Breeder: Clarence Mackay
- Owner: Herbert Pratt; August Belmont Jr.; U.S. Army Remount Service

Gunrock is the official mascot of the UC Davis Aggies, the athletic teams that represent the University of California, Davis, and was based on Gunrock (1914–1932), an American Thoroughbred stallion, and the son of English Triple Crown winner Rock Sand. He was related to the American Thoroughbred racehorse Man O' War (1917–1947), who was out of Mahubah (1910–1931), bay Thoroughbred mare by Rock Sand out of Merry Token. Gunrock was bred by Clarence Mackay, and likely born in Kentucky in 1914. He had an unsuccessful racing career as a 2-year-old, and was retired to stud by age 6 in 1920.

In 1921, Gunrock was donated by his owner, American financier and horse racing investor August Belmont Jr., to the U.S. Army Remount Service, and was brought to the campus of University of California, Davis, which was breeding horses for the Cavalry at the time. Gunrock covered a total of 476 mares during his career at stud, some owned by the university, and the rest from varied farms across northern California. Gunrock's progeny also included Thoroughbred racehorses, including the successful racing mare Sugar Pie (1928) out of Tooters (1918), among others. He also has descendants registered as Holsteiners and Irish Sport Horses.

In 1924, Gunrock was adopted as the official mascot of the men's basketball team, and the stallion accompanied the team to games and rallies. Later, a traditional mascot was created, and named "Gunrock" by the students. That mascot persisted into the 1970s, when he was replaced by "Ollie the Mustang". However, Ollie did not last long, as a period of confusion about the school's mascot and nickname set in, lasting into the first decade of the 21st century.

In 2003, the school's official mascot was officially identified as a Mustang, and the name "Gunrock" returned after 93% of the UC Davis student body voted to return to the original name.

In 2022, the students of UC Davis voted to replace Gunrock the Mustang with a dairy cow after the "#Cow4Mascot" and "#AggieMOOvement" social media campaign, organized by Mick Hashimoto, a third-year applied statistics and economics double major at the university. However, while the vote was 73% in favor of replacement, only 3,468 out of over 31,000 undergraduate students in the UC Davis student body voted. Hashimoto claimed that the students voted to oust Gunrock the Mustang in 1993, but that the school administration and then-Chancellor Theodore L. Hullar rejected the decision. However, UC Davis Chancellor Gary S. May and the Cal Aggie Alumni Association (CAAA) rejected the mascot change proposal, declaring that the school would not be moving forward with it.

== Pedigree ==
The sire of Gunrock, Rock Sand (1900–1914), was a prominent English Thoroughbred race horse and sire of his time. In a career which lasted from the spring of 1902 until October 1904, he ran 20 times, and won 16 races. He was a leading British 2-year-old of his generation, winning the 2,000 Guineas Stakes, the Epsom Derby, and the St. Leger Stakes. He won another series of major races as a 4-year-old before being retired to stud, where he had success in both Europe and North America. Rock Sand's bloodline would also help establish the Selle Français, the national sport horse breed of France, as well as the Holsteiner, Bavarian Warmblood, and other German warmblood breeds in Germany.

The dam of Gunrock, the stakes race mare Gunfire, was sired by Hastings (1893–1917), an American Thoroughbred racehorse and stallion foaled in Versailles, Kentucky, and bred by Dr. John D. Neet. Originally bought for $2,800 at a yearling auction by David Gideon and John Daly, Hastings was sent to New York and raced for the partners successfully as a 2-year-old, winning several races before the partnership was dissolved by public auction. Hastings was then purchased by August Belmont Jr., for a record $37,000. His record at four was 12 starts, 4 wins, and 6 places, carrying weights as high as 140 pounds. He was retired to Nursery Stud outside Lexington, Kentucky, and became one of the most successful sires of 1902 and 1908. Of his offspring, the most notable are stakes race winners Gunfire, Field Mouse, Masterman, and Fair Play, sire of Man o' War.

Gunrock was 4x5 linebred to Springfield (1873–1898), a successful English Thoroughbred racehorse that won 14 consecutive races and was a useful sire of the late 19th century. He was the grandsire of two English Triple Crown winners: Galtee More, who was exported to Russia, and later Germany; and Rock Sand, who was exported to the United States, and in turn was the grandsire of Man o' War (1917–1947), widely considered one of the greatest American Thoroughbred racehorses of all time.

Gunrock was also 5x5x5 linebred to Stockwell on his sire's side, with additional blood from Stockwell on his dam's side as well, and linebred 6x6x6 to King Tom overall.

Pedigree of Gunrock, chestnut horse foaled in 1914
Sire Rock Sand chestnut, 1900	Sainfoin chestnut, 1887	Springfield	St. Albans (by Stockwell)
Sire Rock Sand chestnut, 1900	Sainfoin chestnut, 1887	Springfield	Viridis (by Marsyas)
Sire Rock Sand chestnut, 1900	Sainfoin chestnut, 1887	Sanda	Wenlock (by Lord Clifden)
Sire Rock Sand chestnut, 1900	Sainfoin chestnut, 1887	Sanda	Sandal (by Stockwell)
Sire Rock Sand chestnut, 1900	Roquebrune brown, 1893	St. Simon	Galopin (by Vedette)
Sire Rock Sand chestnut, 1900	Roquebrune brown, 1893	St. Simon	St. Angela (by King Tom)
Sire Rock Sand chestnut, 1900	Roquebrune brown, 1893	St. Marguerite	Hermit (by Newminster)
Sire Rock Sand chestnut, 1900	Roquebrune brown, 1893	St. Marguerite	Devotion (by Stockwell)
Dam Gunfire bay, 1899	Hastings brown, 1893	Spendthrift	Australian (by West Australian)
Dam Gunfire bay, 1899	Hastings brown, 1893	Spendthrift	Aerolite (by Lexington)
Dam Gunfire bay, 1899	Hastings brown, 1893	Cinderella	Tomahawk (by King Tom)
Dam Gunfire bay, 1899	Hastings brown, 1893	Cinderella	Manna (Eclipse descendant)
Dam Gunfire bay, 1899	Royal Gun bay, 1893	Royal Hampton	Hampton (by Lord Clifden)
Dam Gunfire bay, 1899	Royal Gun bay, 1893	Royal Hampton	Princess (by King Tom)
Dam Gunfire bay, 1899	Royal Gun bay, 1893	Spring Gun	Springfield (by St. Albans, by Stockwell)
Dam Gunfire bay, 1899	Royal Gun bay, 1893	Spring Gun	Ambuscade (by Camerino, by Stockwell)

== Stud career ==
Gunrock covered 476 mares during his stud career, which lasted from 1921 to his death in 1932. While U.S. Army Remount stallions were officially not allowed to produce racing stock, he is most notable as a sire of Thoroughbred broodmares, with the racing mare Sugar Pie (1928) being his most successful recorded offspring.

Some of his descendants include, but are not limited to:

- Queen Roxie (1922), mare out of Queen Fay, by King William (Spendthrift line) (7-0-0-0 record, unplaced)
- Lake Rock (1923), mare out of Maria Mortlake, by Mortlake (Hampton line)
- Rockada (1926), mare out of Cruzada, by Cruzados (Emperor of Norfolk / Lexington line)
- California Nora (1927), mare out of Norette, by Norito (Emperor of Norfolk / Lexington line)
- Lady Rock (1928), mare out of Lady Lioness, by Wherewithal (Wenlock / Lord Clifden line)
- Sugar Pie (1928), mare out of Tooters, by Light O' My Life (Hampton line) (47-1-2-4 record, won $550)
- Juanita G (1928), mare out of Satisfaction, by Gargantua (Bend Or line)
- Gunita (1929), mare out of Norette, by Norito (Emperor of Norfolk / Lexington line)
- Little Pebbles (1931), stallion out of Cruzada, by Cruzados (Emperor of Norfolk / Lexington line)
- Roxey Payne (1932), mare out of Helen Payne, by Albert Jones (Sainfoin / Springfield line)
- Roxalyce (1932), mare out of Cruzada, by Cruzados (Emperor of Norfolk / Lexington line)
- Gunrunner (1932), mare out of an unknown dam

One of his male-line grandsons through Little Pebbles, Paco (1941), was exported to Uruguay in South America, where he sired the Thoroughbred stallion Adalid (1956), who had issue. Adalid had 51 starts, 3 wins, 9 places, and 7 shows during his racing career. His most successful descendants are the American Thoroughbred gelding Dogie (2000), who won $100,201 USD during his racing career (41-7-9-10); and the mare Ten Pinkies (1987), who had 20 starts, 5 wins, 2 places, and 2 shows ($14,500 USD in winnings), who also went on to become a successful broodmare, with six of her offspring winning a collective $410,485 USD.

Little Pebbles' most successful daughter, Honey Bravo (1944), has descendant Ozone Gal (1987), a Thoroughbred mare who, while not successful as a racer herself, produced six offspring who won a collective $100,258 USD.

Patricia Erigero, a 1971 UC Davis graduate and owner of the Thoroughbred Heritage site, also owned a champion Thoroughbred show horse named Bay Sands (1956), who descended from Gunrock through his daughter, Rockada (1926), out of the mare Cruzada (1917). Cruzada was a granddaughter of Emperor of Norfolk (1885–1907), a champion Thoroughbred racehorse called the "California Wonder".

While Gunrock primarily covered Thoroughbred mares, "half-bred horses" - better known as warmblood horses today - were considered to be ideal cavalry mounts by some in the United States Army Remount Service. As such, some of Gunrock's descendants have been used to improve various warmblood horse breeds in the United States, such as the Holsteiner and Irish Draught, and to produce sport horses to compete in non-racing equestrian sports.

One of Gunrock's distant relatives was the world champion show jumping Thoroughbred gelding Gem Twist (1979 – 2006), who was a descendant of Gunrock's half-brother, Malachite (Rock Sand x Miss Hanover), one of the grandfathers of the Thoroughbred racehorse Count Fleet (1940 – 1973). Gem Twist has become famous in more recent years due to being the subject of cloning, with two stallion clones of the gelding - Gemini CL (b. 2008) and Murka's Gem (b. 2011) - being used for sport horse breeding programs. A third clone, Gem Twist Alpha Z (b. 2012), was exported to Belgium to stand stud and produce Zangersheide and Belgian Warmblood sport horses and show jumpers.

== See also ==
- List of historical horses
- List of racehorses
- Henry of Navarre (1891–1917), another Thoroughbred used by the United States Army Remount Service
- Sir Barton (1916–1937), another Thoroughbred used by the United States Army Remount Service
- W. K. Kellogg Arabian Horse Center at California State Polytechnic University, Pomona (Cal Poly Pomona)
