= Spendthrift (horse) =

19th-century American Thoroughbred racehorse

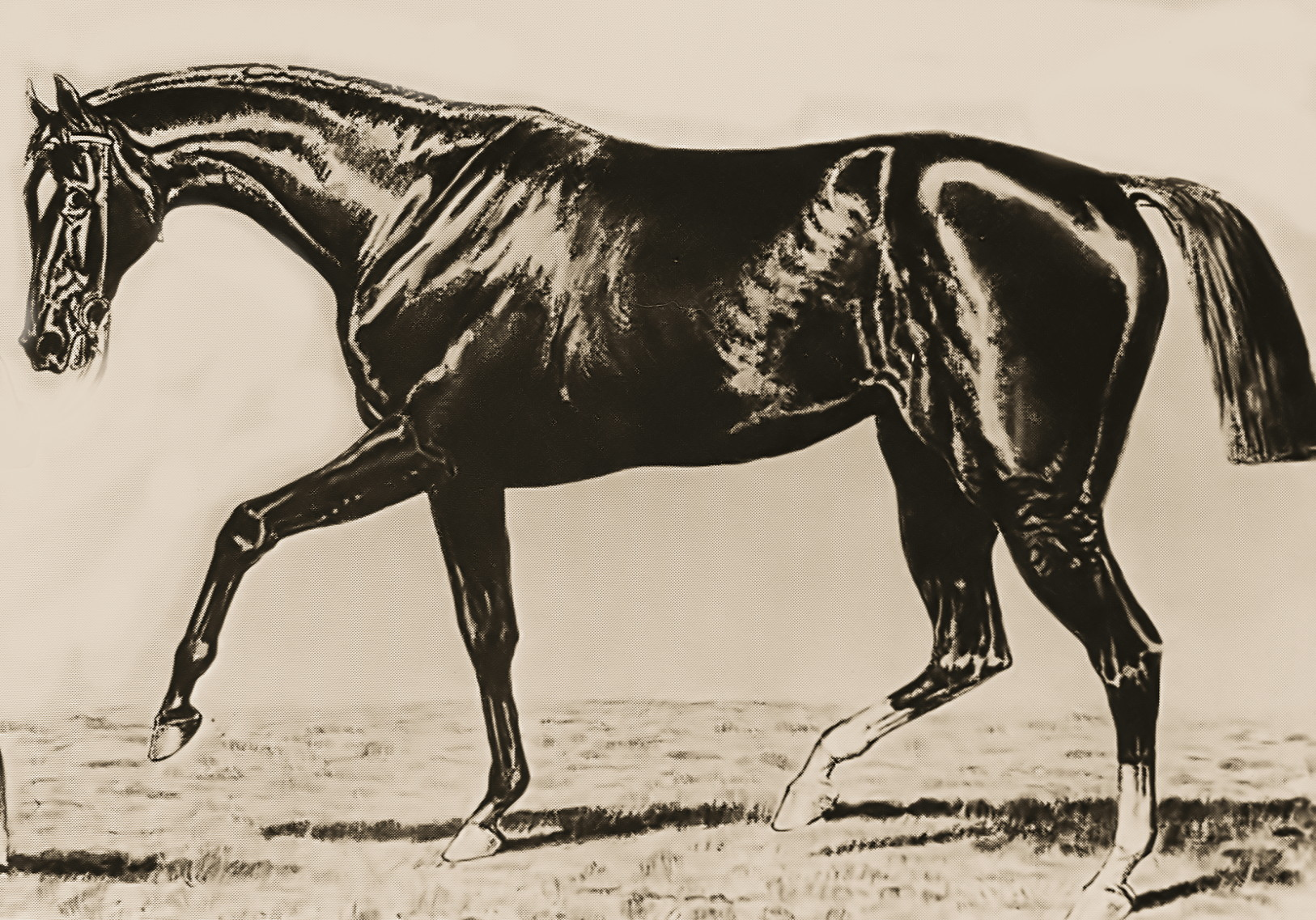
- Sire: Australian (GB)
- Grandsire: West Australian
- Dam: Aerolite
- Damsire: Lexington
- Sex: Stallion
- Foaled: 1876
- Died: October 21, 1900 (aged 23–24)
- Country: United States
- Colour: Chestnut
- Breeder: A. J. Alexander
- Owner: 1) Daniel Swigert; 2) James R. Keene
- Trainer: 1) Edward D. Brown; 2) Thomas Puryear
- Record: 16: 9–5–0
- Earnings: $27,250

Major wins
- Sanford Stakes (1878); Young America Stakes #1 (1878); Young America Stakes #2 (1878); Jersey Derby (1879); Champion Stakes (1879) American Classics wins: Belmont Stakes (1879)

Awards
- American Co-Champion Two-Year-Old Colt (1878)

Spendthrift (foaled 1876 in Kentucky – 21 October 1900) was a successful American Thoroughbred racehorse who fathered a large and successful dynasty of racehorses.

== Breeding ==
Bred by A. J. Alexander and foaled at his Woodburn Stud, he was sired by the English-bred stallion, Australian, who was in turn the son of West Australian, England's first Triple Crown winner, out of Aerolite by Lexington. He was a brother to Fellowcraft and half brother to Addie C. (the dam of the 1894 Kentucky Derby winner Chant (by Falsetto). They were from the old American family number, A3.

Spendthrift was bought by Daniel Swigert for $1,000 (equal to about $30,000 today) at the Woodburn yearling sale and named for Swigert's wife's extravagant spending habits in New York.

== Racing record ==
The widely respected African-American trainer and future U.S. Racing Hall of Fame inductee Edward Brown race conditioned the two-year-old Spendthrift for Daniel Swigert. After leading the colt through an undefeated year that would retrospectively see him named the American Co-Champion Two-Year-Old Colt of 1878, he was then sold to James R. Keene for $15,000 (based on inflation only equal to about $490,000 today).

At three, trained for his new owner by Col. Thomas Puryear, Spendthrift was sent east; finishing second to a stablemate in the Withers Stakes before going on to easily win the 1879 Belmont Stakes. He then won the Jersey Derby despite being kicked at the start.

In 1880, Spendthrift was one of a group of horses, which included Lord Murphy and Foxhall, that were sent by Keene to be trained in England.

Spendthrift was retired as a five-year-old to the farm of William Kenney near Lexington, Kentucky. In all, his record stands as 16 starts, with 9 wins and 5 places.

== Stud record ==
He was sold by Keene in 1884 and spent some time first at Dr. E. M. Norwood's farm near Lexington, then Hartland Stud, then Spendthrift Stud, before ending up at Overton Chenault's farm.

Some of his outstanding progeny were

- Bankrupt-won 86 races from 348 starts
- Hastings-leading sire and sire of Fair Play (three times leading sire and sire of Man o' War and Chance Play).
- Kingston-had 138 starts and won a record 89 races, including 30 stakes-races, scoring the most victories of any Thoroughbred racehorse on record, for $139,652.
- Lamplighter-won multiple stakes, successful sire

Spendthrift-died of old age at 24, on October 21, 1900.

== Sire line tree ==
- Spendthrift
  - Bankrupt
  - Kingston
    - Ildrim
    - Kings Courier
    - Hurst Park
      - Brousseau
    - Novelty
  - Lamplighter
    - Arsenal
    - Holscher
  - Assignee
  - Lazzarone
  - Hastings
    - Leonid
      - Lytle
    - Masterman
    - Glorifier
    - Don Enrique
    - Fair Play
      - Stromboli
      - Earlocker
      - Mad Hatter
        - The Nut
        - Cocked Hat
        - Cresta Run
      - Man o' War
        - Annapolis
        - American Flag
        - Gun Boat
        - Crusader
        - Mars
        - Scapa Flow
        - Clyde Van Dusen
        - Hard Tack
        - Battleship
        - Fleet Flag
        - Blockade
        - Ship Executive
        - Tsukitomo
        - War Admiral
        - Great War
        - Sky Raider
        - War Relic
      - Chatterton
        - Faireno
      - My Play
      - Dunlin
        - Snap Back
        - Head Play
      - Fairmount
      - Ladkin
        - Ladder
      - Mad Play
      - Chance Play
        - Psychic Bid
        - Grand Slam
        - Some Chance
        - Pot O'Luck
      - Display
        - Discovery
      - Chance Shot
        - Peace Chance
        - Chance Sun
        - Shot Put
        - Your Chance
        - Bushwhacker
      - Best Play
    - Flittergold

== Pedigree ==
Pedigree of Spendthrift (USA), chestnut stallion, 1876
Sire Australian (GB) 1858	West Australian (GB); 1850	Melbourne	Humphrey Clinker
Sire Australian (GB) 1858	West Australian (GB); 1850	Melbourne	Cervantes Mare
Sire Australian (GB) 1858	West Australian (GB); 1850	Mowerina	Touchstone
Sire Australian (GB) 1858	West Australian (GB); 1850	Mowerina	Emma
Sire Australian (GB) 1858	Emilia (GB); 1840	Young Emilius	Emilius
Sire Australian (GB) 1858	Emilia (GB); 1840	Young Emilius	Shoveller
Sire Australian (GB) 1858	Emilia (GB); 1840	Persian	Whisker
Sire Australian (GB) 1858	Emilia (GB); 1840	Persian	Variety
Dam Aerolite (USA) 1861	Lexington (USA); 1850	Boston	Timoleon
Dam Aerolite (USA) 1861	Lexington (USA); 1850	Boston	Sister to Tuckahoe
Dam Aerolite (USA) 1861	Lexington (USA); 1850	Alice Carneal	Sarpedon
Dam Aerolite (USA) 1861	Lexington (USA); 1850	Alice Carneal	Rowena
Dam Aerolite (USA) 1861	Florine (USA); 1854	Glencoe	Sultan
Dam Aerolite (USA) 1861	Florine (USA); 1854	Glencoe	Trampoline
Dam Aerolite (USA) 1861	Florine (USA); 1854	Melody	Medoc
Dam Aerolite (USA) 1861	Florine (USA); 1854	Melody	Haxall's Moses mare (Family: A3)

== See also ==
- List of leading Thoroughbred racehorses
