= Now What (horse) =

American-bred Thoroughbred racehorse

- Sire: Chance Play
- Grandsire: Fair Play
- Dam: That's That
- Damsire: High Time
- Sex: Filly
- Foaled: 1937
- Country: United States
- Colour: Chestnut
- Breeder: Three D's Stock Farm
- Owner: Alfred G. Vanderbilt II
- Trainer: Joseph H. "Bud" Stotler
- Record: 19: 5-4-0
- Earnings: US$37,045

Major wins
- Arlington Lassie Stakes (1939); Astoria Stakes (1939); Demoiselle Stakes (1939); Spinaway Stakes (1939)

Awards
- American Champion Two-Year-Old Filly (1939)

Now What (foaled 1937, in Kentucky) was an American Thoroughbred Champion racehorse. Her dam was That's That, and her sire was the 1927 American Horse of the Year and two-time Leading sire in North America, Chance Play.

Bred by Guy and E. Paul Waggoner's Three D's Stock Farm of Fort Worth, Texas, Now What was raced by Alfred G. Vanderbilt II. Trained by Bud Stotler, she earned National Champion honors at age two after winning four important stakes races and running second in the Pimlico Nursery Stakes, and Juvenile Stakes. As a three-year-old, her best result in a top-level race was a second-place finish in the Molly Brant Handicap at Saratoga Race Course.

Now What served as a broodmare for Vanderbilt. Her most successful foal to race was Next Move, the 1950 American Champion Three-Year-Old Filly and the 1952 American Co-Champion Older Female Horse.

== Pedigree ==
Pedigree of Now What, chestnut mare, 1937
| Sire Chance Play | Fair Play | Hastings | Spendthrift |
| Sire Chance Play | Fair Play | Hastings | Cinderella |
| Sire Chance Play | Fair Play | Fairy Gold | Bend Or |
| Sire Chance Play | Fair Play | Fairy Gold | Dame Masham |
| Sire Chance Play | Quelle Chance | Ethelbert | Eothen |
| Sire Chance Play | Quelle Chance | Ethelbert | Maori |
| Sire Chance Play | Quelle Chance | Quelle Est Belle | Rock Sand |
| Sire Chance Play | Quelle Chance | Quelle Est Belle | Queens Bower |
| Dam That's That | High Time | Ultimus | Commando |
| Dam That's That | High Time | Ultimus | Running Stream |
| Dam That's That | High Time | Noonday | Domino |
| Dam That's That | High Time | Noonday | Sundown |
| Dam That's That | Rush Box | Box | Order |
| Dam That's That | Rush Box | Box | Pandora |
| Dam That's That | Rush Box | Sallie Ward | Singleton |
| Dam That's That | Rush Box | Sallie Ward | Belle Nutter (family: 20) |
