= Miss Disco =

American Thoroughbred racehorse and broodmare

- Sire: Discovery
- Grandsire: Display
- Dam: Outdone
- Damsire: Pompey
- Sex: Mare
- Foaled: 1944 Sagamore Farm Reistertown, Maryland
- Died: 1974
- Country: United States
- Color: Bay
- Breeder: Alfred Gwynne Vanderbilt Jr.
- Owner: Sydney S. Schupper
- Trainer: Anthony Pascuma; Jacob Byer (1949)
- Record: 54: 10-3-10
- Earnings: US$80,250

Major wins
- Can't Wait Handicap (1947); Test Stakes (1947); American Legion Handicap (1948); Interborough Handicap (1948); New Rochelle Handicap (1948)

Awards
- Kentucky Broodmare of the Year (1958)

Miss Disco (1944–1974) was an American Thoroughbred racemare that won important sprint events against colts during her racing career but she secured her place in history when, as a broodmare at Claiborne Farm, she was bred to Nasrullah and produced the very influential National Champion and Hall of Fame sire Bold Ruler.

== Background ==
A foal of 1944, Miss Disco was bred by Alfred Vanderbilt Jr. at his Sagamore Farm in Reisterstown, Maryland. Miss Disco's dam was stakes winner Outdone, a daughter of the 1925 Belmont Futurity winner, Pompey. As a result of her breeding, she is a full sister to Loser Weeper, whose wins include the 1949 Metropolitan and 1950 Suburban Handicaps.

During World War II Alfred Vanderbilt was serving with the United States Navy and as such it was necessary for him to sell off some of his yearlings. Among those sold was Miss Disco who was purchased by Sydney Schupper for $2,100 from a 1945 New York auction.

=== Racing career ===
Like her brother Loser Weeper, Miss Disco was a durable horse and while not uncommon in that era, she made 54 starts. First raced as a two-year-old, in stakes events Miss Disco ran third in the four and one-half furlong Fashion Stakes won by First Flight and third to winner Royal Governor in the six-furlong Babylon Handicap. As a three-year-old, she began to develop into a legitimate competitor at Sprint race distances, winning the six-furlong Can't Wait Stakes and the Test Stakes at seven furlongs. At age four, Miss Disco won the Interborough and New Rochelle Handicaps at six furlongs and the American Legion Handicap at seven.

Miss Disco's owner, Sydney Schupper, kept her racing at ages five and six. During this time, her full brother Loser Weeper was winning a good deal of top races, which enhanced her value as a prospective broodmare.

=== Broodmare ===
With her pending retirement from racing, Claiborne Farm owner Bull Hancock advised his client Gladys Phipps to purchase Miss Disco for breeding. Hancock believed the mare would be an ideal mate for Nasrullah, the Irish-bred stallion he and his partners had recently imported. Nasrullah, who went to lead the North American sire list five times, was the son of the great Italian-bred Nearco, who was undefeated in all fourteen starts. In turn, Nearco sired Nearctic, the 1958 Canadian Horse of the Year whose son Northern Dancer was the 20th century's greatest sire.

Miss Disco was first bred to Rosemont. This mating produced the 1951 filly Hill Rose. who was bred in 1965 to Northern Dancer in his first season at stud. From this match came the very good gelded runner True North, whose wins for owner Cornelius Vanderbilt Whitney included the rich 1971 Widener Handicap.

The following year, Miss Disco was bred to Nasrullah. The resulting foal was a colt named Independence, who had success in steeplechase racing, including a win in the prestigious American Grand National.

Bred again to Nasrullah, Miss Disco produced a 1953 filly named Explorer who won six minor races from nineteen starts. Her offspring met with modest success in racing and at stud.

Miss Disco's fourth foal, and third by Nasrullah, was a son who not only earned American Horse of the Year honors and was inducted into the U.S. Racing Hall of Fame but became a stallion that ranks among the upper echelon of successful sires in all of Thoroughbred racing. An eight-time leading sire in North America, Bold Ruler was the sire of eleven National Champions including the 1973 U.S. Triple Crown winner Secretariat. Bold Ruler was also a sire of sires whose lineage counts Ruffian and numerous other racing greats.

Seven further foals were born to Miss Disco between 1955 and 1965, of which four were unraced. Her daughter Foolish One (1957) produced Funny Fellow (1965), a good stayer noted for having only one eye that won multiple top-level races including the Lawrence Realization Stakes and the Roamer, Gallant Fox, and Donn Handicaps. Foolish One was also the dam of Protanto (1967), a multiple stakes winner from age two through four and the sire of San Juan Capistrano Stakes winner Properantes. The remainder of Miss Disco's foals did not enhance the bloodline.

== Pedigree ==
Pedigree of Miss Disco, bay mare, 1944
Sire Discovery	Display	Fair Play	Hastings
Sire Discovery	Display	Fair Play	Fairy Gold
Sire Discovery	Display	Cicuta	Nassovian
Sire Discovery	Display	Cicuta	Hemlock
Sire Discovery	Ariadne	Light Brigade	Picton
Sire Discovery	Ariadne	Light Brigade	Bridge of Sighs
Sire Discovery	Ariadne	Adrienne	His Majesty
Sire Discovery	Ariadne	Adrienne	Adriana
Dam Outdone	Pompey	Sun Briar	Sundridge
Dam Outdone	Pompey	Sun Briar	Sweet Briar
Dam Outdone	Pompey	Cleopatra	Corcyra
Dam Outdone	Pompey	Cleopatra	Gallice
Dam Outdone	Sweep Out	Sweep On	Sweep
Dam Outdone	Sweep Out	Sweep On	Yodler
Dam Outdone	Sweep Out	Dugout	Under Fire
Dam Outdone	Sweep Out	Dugout	Cloak (family: 8-d)
