= Chatterton (horse) =

American racehorse

- Sire: Fair Play
- Grandsire: Hastings
- Dam: Chit Chat
- Damsire: Rock Sand
- Sex: Stallion
- Foaled: 1919
- Died: July 14, 1933
- Country: United States
- Color: Chestnut
- Breeder: August Belmont II
- Owner: Frank J. Kelley
- Trainer: Charles C. Van Meter
- Record: 32: 15-5-4
- Earnings: $26,565

Major wins
- Autumn Handicap (1922); Falls City Handicap (1922)

Awards
- Leading sire in North America (1932)

Chatterton (1919 – July 14, 1933) was an American Thoroughbred racehorse, best known as the leading sire in North America of 1932, when his son Faireno won the Belmont Stakes. During his racing career, he won 15 of 32 starts, including the Autumn Handicap and Falls City Handicap.

== Background ==
Chatterton was a chestnut horse bred in Kentucky by August Belmont II, who had also bred the great Man o' War on the same cross of Fair Play with a daughter of Rock Sand. Fair Play was considered one of the best racehorses of his generation, though a step below the undefeated Colin. He was even better as a sire, leading the American sire list in 1920, 1924 and 1927. In addition to Man o' War, Fair Play sired several other champions and/or important sires like Display, Chance Play and Mad Hatter. Chatterton is a full brother to the notable broodmare Étoile Filante, whose family has produced multiple stakes winners such as Grindstone and Silverbulletday.

During his racing career, Chatterton was owned by Frank Kelley and was trained by Charles Van Meter.

== Racing career ==
Chatterton raced won 15 of 32 starts, with earnings of $26,565. The highlights of his career were wins in the Autumn Handicap at Latonia and the Falls City Handicap at Churchill Downs in 1922. In the latter race, run on August 30, Chatterton went off at odds of 5-1 while carrying 104 pounds, compared to 108 and 109 pounds on the favored entry of Rockminster and Rouleau. Chatterton had a three length lead at the head of the stretch and managed to hold off a late charge from Rockminster to win by a neck.

== Stud career ==
Chatterton was originally retired to Kelley's stud farm in California. After Kelley's death, Chatterton was transferred to Claiborne Farm in Kentucky. In 1932, he stood at Arrowbrook Farm in Illinois but returned to Claiborne in 1933 after Faireno's win in the 1932 Belmont Stakes helped make him the leading sire in North America. He sired a total of 213 named foals, 107 (50%) of which became winners. His 11 (5%) black-type winners included Faireno and champion filly Current.

Chatterton died on July 14, 1933, due to kidney disease at the relatively young age of 14.

== Pedigree ==
Pedigree of Chatterton, chestnut horse, 1919
Sire Fair Play	Hastings	Spendthrift	*Australian
Sire Fair Play	Hastings	Spendthrift	Aerolite
Sire Fair Play	Hastings	*Cinderella	Tomahawk (GB)
Sire Fair Play	Hastings	*Cinderella	Manna
Sire Fair Play	*Fairy Gold	Bend Or (GB)	Doncaster (GB)
Sire Fair Play	*Fairy Gold	Bend Or (GB)	Rouge Rose (GB)
Sire Fair Play	*Fairy Gold	Dame Masham (GB)	Galliard (GB)
Sire Fair Play	*Fairy Gold	Dame Masham (GB)	Pauline (GB)
Dam Chit Chat	*Rock Sand	Sainfoin (GB)	Springfield (GB)
Dam Chit Chat	*Rock Sand	Sainfoin (GB)	Sanda (GB)
Dam Chit Chat	*Rock Sand	Roquebrune (GB)	St. Simon (GB)
Dam Chit Chat	*Rock Sand	Roquebrune (GB)	St. Marguerite (GB)
Dam Chit Chat	*Chinkara	Galopin (GB)	Vedette (GB)
Dam Chit Chat	*Chinkara	Galopin (GB)	Flying Duchess
Dam Chit Chat	*Chinkara	Raker (GB)	The Scottish Chief (GB)
Dam Chit Chat	*Chinkara	Raker (GB)	Fravolina (GB) (family 1-c)
