= Hastings (horse) =

American-bred Thoroughbred racehorse

- Sire: Spendthrift
- Grandsire: Australian
- Dam: Cinderella
- Damsire: Tomahawk
- Sex: Stallion
- Foaled: February 5, 1893; Versailles, Kentucky, U.S.
- Died: June 17, 1917 (aged 23–24); Nursery Stud, Lexington, Kentucky, U.S.
- Country: United States
- Color: Brown
- Breeder: Dr. John D. Neet
- Owner: David Gideon & John Daly; August Belmont Jr.
- Trainer: John J. Hyland
- Record: 21: 10-8-0
- Earnings: $16,340

Major wins
- Surf Stakes (1895); Toboggan Handicap (1896); Kearney Stakes (1896); Kearney Handicap (1897); Westchester Highweight Handicap (1897) American Classics wins: Belmont Stakes (1896)

Awards
- Leading sire in North America (1902, 1908)

Hastings (February 5, 1893 – June 17, 1917) was an American Thoroughbred racehorse and stallion.

== Background ==
Hastings was foaled in Versailles, Kentucky and bred by Dr. John D. Neet. He was sired by Spendthrift (Belmont Stakes winner) out of the imported Cinderella (dam of Plaudit, winner of the Kentucky Derby) by Blue Ruin.

Originally, Hastings was bought for $2,800 at a yearling auction by David Gideon and John Daly.

== Racing career ==
Hastings was sent to New York and raced for the partners successfully as a two-year-old, winning several races before the partnership was dissolved by public auction. Hastings was then purchased by August Belmont Jr., for a record $37,000. He was shipped to Saratoga Race Course, but fell ill. His illness may have compromised his form; he finished fifth in his next race, the Futurity Stakes at Sheepshead Bay.

At three, Hastings placed second by a head in the Withers Stakes behind Handspring. He went on to defeat older horses in the Toboggan Handicap. Then he won the Belmont Stakes, beating Handspring by a head. His record at four was 12 starts, four wins and six places, carrying weights as high as 140 pounds.

== Retirement ==
He was retired to Nursury Stud outside Lexington, Kentucky and became one of the most successful sires of 1902 and 1908. Of his offspring, the most notable are stakes race winners Gunfire, Field Mouse, Masterman, and Fair Play, sire of Man o' War.

All offspring of Hastings inherited his savage temperament in some degree, even his great-grandson Hard Tack was uncontrollable on the track.

On June 17, 1917, at age 24, severely crippled with paralysis, Hastings had to be euthanized.

== Sire line tree ==
- Hastings
  - Leonid
    - Lytle
  - Masterman
  - Glorifier
  - Don Enrique
  - Fair Play
    - Stromboli
    - Earlocker
    - Mad Hatter
      - The Nut
      - Cocked Hat
      - Cresta Run
    - Man o' War
      - Annapolis
        - Mercator
      - American Flag
        - Gusto
      - Gun Boat
      - Crusader
        - Crossbow II
        - Royal Crusader
      - Mars
      - Scapa Flow
      - Clyde Van Dusen
      - Hard Tack
        - Seabiscuit
      - Battleship
        - Floating Isle
        - Navigate
        - War Battle
        - Tide Rips
        - Navy Gun
        - Sea Legs
        - Eolus
        - Cap-A-Pie
        - Mighty Mo
        - Shipboard
      - Fleet Flag
      - Blockade
      - Ship Executive
      - Tsukitomo
      - War Admiral
        - Blue Peter
        - Mr Busher
        - Cold Command
        - Navy Page
        - Admiral Vee
      - Great War
      - Sky Raider
      - War Relic
        - Relic
        - Battlefield
        - Intent
        - Missle
    - Chatterton
      - Faireno
    - My Play
      - Head Play
        - El Mono
    - Dunlin
      - Snap Back
    - Fairmount
    - Ladkin
      - Ladder
        - Bunty Lawless
    - Mad Play
    - Chance Play
      - Psychic Bid
      - Grand Slam
        - Piet
      - Some Chance
      - Pot O'Luck
        - Pot Hunter
    - Display
      - Discovery
        - Loser Weeper
        - Find
    - Chance Shot
      - Peace Chance
        - Four Freedoms
      - Chance Sun
      - Shot Put
      - Your Chance
      - Bushwhacker
    - Best Play
  - Flittergold

== Pedigree ==
Pedigree of Hastings, brown stallion, 1893
Sire Spendthrift	Australian	West Australian	Melbourne
Sire Spendthrift	Australian	West Australian	Mowerina
Sire Spendthrift	Australian	Emilia	Young Emilius
Sire Spendthrift	Australian	Emilia	Persian
Sire Spendthrift	Aerolite	Lexington	Boston
Sire Spendthrift	Aerolite	Lexington	Alice Carneal
Sire Spendthrift	Aerolite	Florine	Glencoe
Sire Spendthrift	Aerolite	Florine	Melody
Dam Cinderella	Tomahawk	King Tom	Harkaway
Dam Cinderella	Tomahawk	King Tom	Pocahontas
Dam Cinderella	Tomahawk	Mincemeat	Sweetmeat
Dam Cinderella	Tomahawk	Mincemeat	Hybla
Dam Cinderella	Manna	Brown Bread	Weatherbit
Dam Cinderella	Manna	Brown Bread	Brown Agnes
Dam Cinderella	Manna	Tartlet	Birdcatcher
Dam Cinderella	Manna	Tartlet	Don John mare (family: 21-a)

== See also ==
- List of racehorses
