= Almahmoud =

American-bred Thoroughbred racehorse

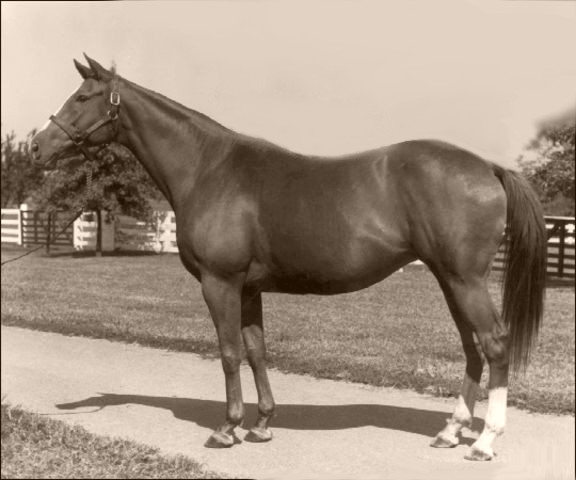
- Sire: Mahmoud (FR)
- Grandsire: Blenheim
- Dam: Arbitrator
- Damsire: Peace Chance
- Sex: Mare
- Foaled: 1947
- Country: United States
- Colour: Chestnut
- Breeder: Cornelius Vanderbilt Whitney
- Owner: William G. Helis, Sr.
- Record: 11: 4-0-1
- Earnings: US$32,760

Major wins
- Colleen Stakes (1949); Vineland Handicap (1950)

Almahmoud (1947–1971) was an American Thoroughbred racemare that was best known as an influential broodmare who produced Natalma and Cosmah.

She was sired by the 1936 Epsom Derby winner Mahmoud, who was imported to the United States in 1940 by Cornelius Vanderbilt Whitney. Her dam was the unraced mare, Arbitrator, a daughter of the 1934 Belmont Stakes winner, Peace Chance. Almahmoud won important races at ages two and three before retiring to broodmare duty.

== Broodmare Career ==
Almahmoud was the dam of the following foals:

- Armistice (1956) gelding by Citation, one win
- Bubbling Beauty (1961) filly by Hasty Road, dam of Arctic Tern
- Cosmah (1953) by Cosmic Bomb, was the 1974 Kentucky Broodmare of the Year and dam of Queen Sucree (dam of Kentucky Derby winner Cannonade) and Halo (sired Kentucky Derby winner Sunny's Halo and U.S. Racing Hall of Fame inductee, Sunday Silence).
- Folk Dancer (1959) by Native Dancer, a winner
- Retinoscope (1958) by Helioscope, placed once
- Nash 1960 gelding by Nashua, won 11 races
- Natalma by Native Dancer, 3 wins and stakes placed, dam of Northern Dancer who the National Thoroughbred Racing Association and others have called "one of the most influential sires in Thoroughbred history"
- Ramadan, colt by Native Dancer, won 1 race

== Pedigree ==
Pedigree of Almahmoud, chestnut mare, 1947
Sire Mahmoud	Blenheim	Blandford	Swynford
Sire Mahmoud	Blenheim	Blandford	Blanche
Sire Mahmoud	Blenheim	Malva	Charles O'Malley
Sire Mahmoud	Blenheim	Malva	Wild Arum
Sire Mahmoud	Mah Mahal	Gainsborough	Bayardo
Sire Mahmoud	Mah Mahal	Gainsborough	Rosedrop
Sire Mahmoud	Mah Mahal	Mumtaz Mahal	The Tetrarch
Sire Mahmoud	Mah Mahal	Mumtaz Mahal	Lady Josephine
Dam Arbitrator	Peace Chance	Chance Shot	Fair Play
Dam Arbitrator	Peace Chance	Chance Shot	Quelle Chance
Dam Arbitrator	Peace Chance	Peace	Stefan The Great
Dam Arbitrator	Peace Chance	Peace	Memories
Dam Arbitrator	Mother Goose	Chicle	Spearmint
Dam Arbitrator	Mother Goose	Chicle	Lady Hamburg
Dam Arbitrator	Mother Goose	Flying Witch	Broomstick
Dam Arbitrator	Mother Goose	Flying Witch	Fly by Night (family: 2-d)
