= Louis Feustel =

American racehorse trainer

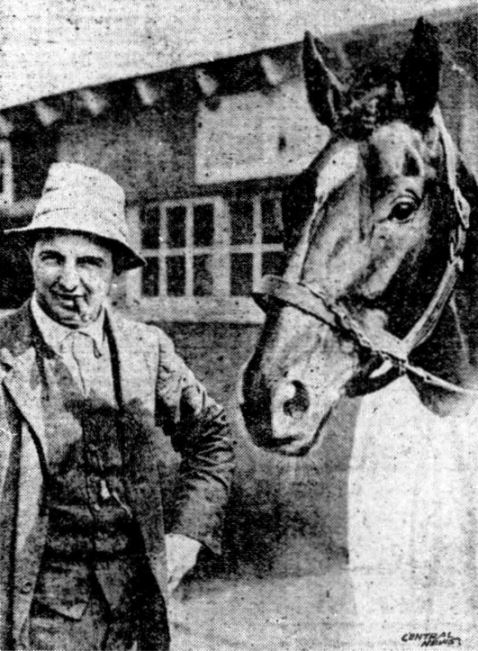
- Louis Feustel and Man o' War from a 1920 newspaper

Personal information
- Born: January 2, 1884 Lindenhurst, NY, United States
- Died: July 7, 1970 (aged 86)
- Occupation: Trainer

Horse racing career
- Sport: Horse racing
- Career wins: Not found

Major racing wins
- Fashion Stakes (1913); Lawrence Realization Stakes (1913); Travers Stakes (1913); Withers Stakes (1913); Brooklyn Derby (1913); Toboggan Handicap (1914); Fleetwing Handicap (1916); Tremont Stakes (1919); Grand Union Hotel Stakes (1919); Hudson Stakes (1919); Sanford Stakes (1919); United States Hotel Stakes (1919); Hopeful Stakes (1919); Keene Memorial Stakes (1919); Futurity Stakes (1919); Youthful Stakes (1919, 1925); Travers Stakes (1920); Jockey Club Gold Cup (1920); Lawrence Realization Stakes (1920); Miller Stakes (1920); Withers Stakes (1920); Potomac Handicap (1920); Dwyer Stakes (1920); Newtown Stakes (1922); Richmond Handicap (1922); Remsen Handicap (1923); International Special No. 2 (1924); Dwyer Stakes (1924); Edgemere Handicap (1924); Empire City Derby (1924); Mount Vernon Handicap (1924); Stuyvesant Handicap (1924); Delaware Handicap (1925); Pierrepont Handicap (1925); Potomac Handicap (1926); Rockaway Stakes (1927); Aqueduct Handicap (1928); Merchants and Citizens Handicap (1938) American Classic Race wins: Preakness Stakes (1920); Belmont Stakes (1920)

Racing awards
- United States Leading trainer by earnings (1920)

Honours
- National Museum of Racing and Hall of Fame (1964)

Significant horses
- Chance Play, Ladkin, Man o' War, Rock View

Louis C. Feustel (January 2, 1884 – July 7, 1970) was an American Thoroughbred horse racing Hall of Fame trainer best known as the trainer of Man o' War.

== The August Belmont Years ==
Born in Lindenhurst, NY, Feustel was only ten years old when he began working in the horse racing industry as a stable hand. At age twenty-four he became a professional trainer. He had a long association with August Belmont Jr., working as a lad at his stable and rising to the position of foreman. and head trainer. In 1913, Feustel conditioned Belmont's colt Rock View to American Champion Three-Year-Old Male Horse honors with wins in several major races including the Brooklyn Derby and the Travers Stakes.

In 1914, August Belmont began winding down his racing operations and sold off a number of his runners. When the United States entered World War I, the sixty-five-year-old August Belmont Jr. joined the United States Army. While overseas he decided to liquidate his racing operations and Louis Feustel went out on his own, racing horses for himself before going to work as the head trainer for Sam Riddle's Glen Riddle Farm. Prior to the 1918 Saratoga auction of the Belmont horses, Feustel had urged Sam Riddle to purchase a yearling son of an August Belmont horse he was very familiar with named Fair Play. Riddle, however, was not impressed enough by the young horse and balked at buying until his wife put added pressure on him.

== Man o' War ==
Riddle's reluctant purchase was named Man o' War and Louis Feustel prepared the colt for the 1919 racing campaign at training facilities in Maryland. The trainer brought him along slowly and after making his debut in mid year, Man o' War won nine of his ten starts and earned American Champion Two-Year-Old Colt honors. In his three-year-old season, under Feustel's handling Man o' War won all ten of his starts. The term Triple Crown did not come into use until 1930 and in February 1920 Sam Riddle announced that Man o' War would not make the long train journey south to run in the Kentucky Derby. However, they won the Preakness in Baltimore, Maryland, and set a new record in winning Elmont, New York's Belmont Stakes. In addition, he set records at New York tracks while winning the Dwyer, the Lawrence Realization and Withers Stakes. At the end of the year, Man o' War was retired to stud.

His1920 earnings helped Louis Feustel become that year's leading money-winning trainer in the United States. Following its formation, both Feustel and the horse would be inducted in the National Museum of Racing and Hall of Fame and in the Blood-Horse magazine List of the Top 100 U.S. Racehorses of the 20th Century, Man o' War was ranked Number one.

== Later life ==
Relations between Louis Feustel and Sam Riddle became strained and near the end of June 1921 he made arrangements with his old employer, August Belmont Jr., who had rebuilt his racing and horse breeding business, to prepare his yearlings for racing. Although Feustel won the May 1922 Newtown Stakes and Richmond Handicap with Sam Riddle's horses, by the end of the year he was once again training all of the August Belmont Jr. stable. In 1924, Feustel conditioned Ladkin to his historic win in the International Special No. 2 over the European superstar, Epinard. August Belmont Jr. died that year and Feustel was once again out on his own. In the latter part of the 1920s he began conditioning horses for newspaper publisher, Bernard Ritter and in the 1930s he trained a successful racing stable for Mrs. Elizabeth Graham Lewis.

A serious automobile accident in February 1943 kept Louis Feustel out of racing for several months and in 1950, after forty-two years training horses, he retired. He and his wife eventually made their home in Pasadena, California. Following his wife's death, in the late 1960s Feustel was living with a son in Chicago.

Louis Feustel died on July 7, 1970, at age eighty-six.
