= Potomac Handicap =

- Class: Discontinued stakes
- Location: Havre de Grace Racetrack; Havre de Grace, Maryland
- Inaugurated: 1914-1948
- Race type: Thoroughbred - Flat racing

Race information
- Distance: 1⅛ miles (9 furlongs)
- Track: Dirt, left-handed
- Qualification: Three-years-old

The Potomac Handicap was an American Thoroughbred horse race run annually in the latter part of September at Havre de Grace Racetrack in Havre de Grace, Maryland. Open to three-year-old horses, it was raced on dirt at a distance of a mile-and-a-sixteenth.

First run at Laurel Park Racecourse in Laurel, Maryland, it was restricted to two-year-olds and run at a distance of one mile. The 1918 running was won by Calumet Farm's two-year-old colt, Be Frank, ridden by Lavelle Ensor. The following year the race moved to the Havre de Grace Racetrack and was changed to an event for three-year-olds and set at a distance of a mile-and-a-sixteenth.

The Potomac Handicap was won by four National Museum of Racing and Hall of Fame inductees including 1919 U.S. Triple Crown winner Sir Barton and Man o' War who won the 1920 edition. Despite being assigned highweight of 138 pounds, Man o' War set a new Havre de Grace track record for a mile-and-a-sixteenth.

Venue:

- Laurel : 1916-1918, 1944-1948
- Pimlico: 1943
- Havre de Grace Racetrack: 1919-1942

== Records ==
Speed record: (3-year-olds)

- 1 1/16 miles: 1:44 flat, Menow (1938)
- 1 1/8 miles: 1:50 3/5, Loyal Legion (1947)

Speed record: (2-year-olds)

- 1 mile: 1:39 1/5, Be Frank (1918)

Most wins by a jockey:

- 2 - Clarence Kummer (1915, 1920)
- 2 - Andy Schuttinger (1917, 1922)
- 2 - Clarence Kummer (1921, 1931)
- 2 - Albert Snider (1946, 1947)

Most wins by a trainer:

- 2 - Clyde S. Phillips (1916, 1930)
- 2 - Thomas J. Healey (1925, 1936)
- 2 - Bud Stotler (1934, 1935)
- 2 - James Radney (1946, 1948)

Most wins by an owner:

- 2 - Willis Sharpe Kilmer (1928, 1933)
- 2 - Alfred G. Vanderbilt II (1934, 1935)
- 2 - Mrs. Ellsworth H. Augustus (1946, 1948)

== Winners ==
| Year | Winner | Age | Jockey | Trainer | Owner | Dist. (Miles) | Time |
|---|---|---|---|---|---|---|---|
| 1948 | Seven League | 3 | Mike Basile | James Radney | Elizabeth Good Augustus | 1 1/8 M | 1:52.80 |
| 1947 | Loyal Legion | 3 | Albert Snider | Oscar White | Walter M. Jeffords Sr. | 1 1/8 M | 1:50.60 |
| 1946 | Blue Yonder | 3 | Albert Snider | James Radney | Elizabeth Good Augustus | 1 1/8 M | 1:56.60 |
| 1945 | British Buddy | 3 | Johnny Breen | James McGee | Morris Wexler | 1 1/8 M | 1:51.40 |
| 1944 | Megogo | 3 | Ken Scawthorn | John A. Healey | Christiana Stable | 1 1/16 M | 1:49.60 |
| 1943 | Son of Peace | 3 | Billie Thompson | Ben A. Jones | Calumet Farm | 1 1/8 M | 1:52.60 |
| 1942 | Aletern | 3 | Jimmy Thornburg | Jack Skirvin | Alwin C. Ernst | 1 1/16 M | 1:47.20 |
| 1941 | Boston Man | 3 | Ted Atkinson | George L. Arvin | H. Teller Archibald | 1 1/16 M | 1:45.80 |
| 1940 | Mioland | 3 | Carroll Bierman | Tom Smith | Charles S. Howard | 1 1/16 M | 1:46.60 |
| 1939 | Third Degree | 3 | Wayne D. Wright | John M. Gaver Sr. | Greentree Stable | 1 1/16 M | 1:44.80 |
| 1938 | Menow | 3 | Raymond Workman | Duval A. Headley | Hal Price Headley | 1 1/16 M | 1:44.00 |
| 1937 | Heelfly | 3 | George Woolf | Lemuel T. Whitehill | Thomas Painter Morgan | 1 1/16 M | 1:45.20 |
| 1936 | Tatterdemalion | 3 | Jack Westrope | Thomas J. Healey | Cornelius Vanderbilt Whitney | 1 1/16 M | 1:44.80 |
| 1935 | Good Gamble | 3 | Sam Renick | Bud Stotler | Alfred G. Vanderbilt II | 1 1/16 M | 1:45.40 |
| 1934 | Discovery | 3 | John Bejshak | Bud Stotler | Alfred G. Vanderbilt II | 1 1/16 M | 1:45.20 |
| 1933 | Sun Archer | 3 | Pete Walls | Jack Whyte | Willis Sharpe Kilmer | 1 1/16 M | 1:44.80 |
| 1932 | Dark Secret | 3 | Hank Mills | James E. Fitzsimmons | Wheatley Stable | 1 1/16 M | 1:45.40 |
| 1931 | Tambour | 3 | Frank Coltiletti | Preston M. Burch | Preston M. Burch | 1 1/16 M | 1:45.20 |
| 1930 | Spinach | 3 | Alfred Robertson | Clyde S. Phillips | William Ziegler Jr. | 1 1/16 M | 1:47.40 |
| 1929 | Rose of Sharon | 3 | Charles E. Allen | Daniel E. Stewart | Johnson N. Camden Jr. | 1 1/16 M | 1:46.40 |
| 1928 | Sun Beau | 3 | John Craigmyle | William Short | Willis Sharpe Kilmer | 1 1/16 M | 1:46.00 |
| 1927 | Jock | 3 | Eddie Ambrose | John F. Schorr | Edward B. McLean | 1 1/16 M | 1:44.60 |
| 1926 | Chance Play | 3 | Earl Sande | G. Hamilton Keene | Log Cabin Stable | 1 1/16 M | 1:47.00 |
| 1925 | Senalado | 3 | Edgar Barnes | Thomas J. Healey | Richard T. Wilson Jr. | 1 1/16 M | 1:46.20 |
| 1924 | Donaghee | 3 | Fred Sharpe | Joseph P. Smith | James W. Bean | 1 1/16 M | 1:46.20 |
| 1923 | Dunlin | 3 | Chick Lang | J. Woods Garth | Joshua S. Cosden | 1 1/16 M | 1:49.00 |
| 1922 | Lucky Hour | 3 | Andy Schuttinger | Roy Waldron | Lexington Stable | 1 1/16 M | 1:46.60 |
| 1921 | Tryster | 3 | Frank Coltiletti | James G. Rowe Sr. | Harry Payne Whitney | 1 1/16 M | 1:46.40 |
| 1920 | Man o' War | 3 | Clarence Kummer | Louis Feustel | Glen Riddle Farm | 1 1/16 M | 1:44.80 |
| 1919 | Sir Barton | 3 | Tommy Nolan | H. Guy Bedwell | J. K. L. Ross | 1 1/16 M | 1:46.40 |
| 1918 | Be Frank | 2 | Lavelle Ensor | William Jennings Jr. | Calumet Stable (Cornelius M. Garrison) | 1 M | 1:39.20 |
| 1917 | Recount | 2 | Andy Schuttinger | A. J. Goldsborough | Andrew Miller | 1 M | 1:41.60 |
| 1916 | Bondage | 2 | R. Ball | Clyde S. Phillips | James Arthur | 1 M | 1:40.00 |
| 1915 | King Neptune | 2 | Clarence Turner | B. B. Larrick | John S. Tyree | 1 M | 1:43.20 |
| 1914 | Sharpshooter | 2 | Kenneth Karrick | William H. Karrick | Schuyler L. Parsons | 1 M | 1:39.40 |
