= Hard Tack (horse) =

American-bred Thoroughbred racehorse

- Sire: Man o' War
- Dam: Tea Biscuit
- Damsire: Rock Sand
- Sex: Stallion
- Foaled: 1926
- Country: United States
- Colour: Chestnut
- Breeder: James Cox Brady
- Owner: Wheatley Stable
- Trainer: Sunny Jim Fitzsimmons
- Record: 15: 3-2-2
- Earnings: $16,820

Major wins
- Saranac Handicap (1928); Knickerbocker Handicap (1928)
- Last updated on August 17, 2018

Hard Tack (March 25, 1926 – September 21, 1947) was an American Thoroughbred racehorse bred by James Cox Brady and sold after his death to the Wheatley Stable of Gladys Mills Phipps and her brother Ogden L. Mills. Sired by Man o' War, he showed considerable promise as a racer, but his temper prevented him from achieving success on the track. As an example, on one occasion when the starting gate opened and the horses rushed out, Hard Tack stood perfectly still, refusing to budge.

Retired to stand at stud at Claiborne Farm near Paris, Kentucky, Hard Tack went on to sire the great racer Seabiscuit.

== Sire line tree ==
- Hard Tack
  - Seabiscuit
    - Sea Sovereign
    - Sea Swallow

== Pedigree ==
Pedigree of Hard Tack, chestnut stallion, 1926
Sire Man o' War	Fair Play	Hastings	Spendthrift
Sire Man o' War	Fair Play	Hastings	Cinderella
Sire Man o' War	Fair Play	Fairy Gold	Bend Or
Sire Man o' War	Fair Play	Fairy Gold	Dame Masham
Sire Man o' War	Mahubah	Rock Sand	Sainfoin
Sire Man o' War	Mahubah	Rock Sand	Roquebrune
Sire Man o' War	Mahubah	Merry Token	Merry Hampton
Sire Man o' War	Mahubah	Merry Token	Mizpah
Dam Tea Biscuit	Rock Sand	Sainfoin	Springfield
Dam Tea Biscuit	Rock Sand	Sainfoin	Sanda
Dam Tea Biscuit	Rock Sand	Roquebrune	St. Simon
Dam Tea Biscuit	Rock Sand	Roquebrune	St. Marguerite
Dam Tea Biscuit	Tea's Over	Hanover	Hindoo
Dam Tea Biscuit	Tea's Over	Hanover	Bourbon Belle
Dam Tea Biscuit	Tea's Over	Tea Rose	King Alfonso
Dam Tea Biscuit	Tea's Over	Tea Rose	Tuberose (family: 9)
