= Loser Weeper =

American Thoroughbred racehorse

- Sire: Discovery
- Grandsire: Display
- Dam: Outdone
- Damsire: Pompey
- Sex: Stallion
- Foaled: 1945
- Country: United States
- Color: Chestnut
- Breeder: Alfred G. Vanderbilt Jr.
- Owner: Alfred G. Vanderbilt Jr.
- Trainer: Bill Winfrey
- Record: 63: 16-5-7
- Earnings: US$235,945

Major wins
- Metropolitan Handicap (1949); Valley Forge Handicap (1949, 1950); Vosburgh Handicap (1949); Bay Shore Handicap (1949); Dixie Handicap (1950); Edward Buke Handicap (1950); Butler Handicap (1950); Suburban Handicap (1950)

Loser Weeper (1945–1960) was an American Thoroughbred racehorse bred and raced by Alfred Vanderbilt Jr. and trained by future U.S. Racing Hall of Fame inductee, Bill Winfrey. At the time of his retirement from racing in 1951, a major media publication for horse racing referred to Loser Weeper as "one of Discovery's outstanding sons."

== Background ==
A foal of 1945, Loser Weeper was bred by Alfred Vanderbilt Jr.'s Sagamore Farm in Reisterstown, Maryland. His sire Discovery was purchased as a three-year-old by Vanderbilt and earned American Horse of the Year honors for him as well as a place in the U. S. Racing Hall of Fame.

Loser Weeper's dam was stakes winner Outdone, a daughter of the 1925 Belmont Futurity winner, Pompey. As a result of his breeding, Loser Weeper is a full brother to Miss Disco, the dam of the very influential National Champion and Hall of Fame sire Bold Ruler. Through another daughter, Delmarie, Pompey was also the damsire of Count Turf, winner of the 1951 Kentucky Derby.

== Racing career ==
As a three-year-old Loser Weeper did not have a significant win but did run second in the Kent Stakes and third in both the Dwyer Stakes and the race named for his sire, the Discovery Handicap. He started to make an impact in racing as a four-year-old when in May 1949 he won the prestigious Met Mile at Belmont Park under future Canadian Horse Racing Hall of Fame inductee Hedley Woodhouse. He ended the year with other important victories in the Bay Shore and Vosburgh Handicaps plus the first of back-to-back wins in the Valley Forge Handicap at New Jersey's Garden State Park.

At age five in 1950, Loser Weeper had his best year in racing. On May 1, he won the Edward Burke Handicap at Havre de Grace Racetrack in Maryland then seven days later won his second Valley Forge Handicap in New Jersey, defeating future Canadian Hall of Famer Arise. Returning to Maryland, on May 14 Loser Weeper captured the 49th edition of the Dixie Handicap at Pimlico.

=== Most important win ===
Loser Weeper's most important triumph of his career came on May 31, 1950, when he beat a strong contingent in the Suburban Handicap, in which Florence Whitaker's My Request finished a neck back in second place. The overwhelming favorite among bettors was Christopher Chenery's Kentucky Derby runner-up and Preakness winner Hill Prince, who ran a crowd-shocking third. The eventual 1950 American Horse of the Year finished more than seven lengths behind Loser Weeper. In sixth place came Deering Howe's aging gelding Donor, followed by Flying Missel, the second choice of the betting public owned by King Ranch, who was seventh and last.

At New York's Empire City Race Track, Loser Weeper won the $50,000 Butler Handicap when Three Rings was disqualified for interference after posting a race-record time for a mile and three-sixteenths that was never surpassed in the event's nineteen-year history.

In addition to his important wins, Loser Weeper ran third behind Cochise and runner-up My Request in the Massachusetts Handicap at Suffolk Downs. The winning time of 2:01 4/5 broke the track record by four-fifths of a second on a track rated fast.

== Stud record ==
In June 1951, Sagamore Farm manager Ralph Kercheval announced that Loser Weeper would be retired to stud. The durable winner had competed in 63 races and although none of his progeny achieved anything close to his level of success, a significant percentage of them demonstrated that durability.

== Pedigree ==
Pedigree of Loser Weeper, chestnut stallion, 1945
Sire Discovery	Display	Fair Play	Hastings
Sire Discovery	Display	Fair Play	Fairy Gold
Sire Discovery	Display	Cicuta	Nassovian
Sire Discovery	Display	Cicuta	Hemlock
Sire Discovery	Ariadne	Light Brigade	Picton
Sire Discovery	Ariadne	Light Brigade	Bridge of Sighs
Sire Discovery	Ariadne	Adrienne	His Majesty
Sire Discovery	Ariadne	Adrienne	Adriana
Dam Outdone	Pompey	Sun Briar	Sundridge
Dam Outdone	Pompey	Sun Briar	Sweet Briar
Dam Outdone	Pompey	Cleopatra	Corcyra
Dam Outdone	Pompey	Cleopatra	Gallice
Dam Outdone	Sweep Out	Sweep On	Sweep
Dam Outdone	Sweep Out	Sweep On	Yodler
Dam Outdone	Sweep Out	Dugout	Under Fire
Dam Outdone	Sweep Out	Dugout	Cloak (family: 8-d)
