= Pot O'Luck =

American-bred Thoroughbred racehorse

- Sire: Chance Play
- Grandsire: Fair Play
- Dam: Potheen
- Damsire: Wildair
- Sex: Stallion
- Foaled: 1942
- Country: United States
- Colour: Bay
- Breeder: Calumet Farm
- Owner: Calumet Farm
- Trainer: Ben A. Jones
- Record: 54: 14-11-5
- Earnings: US$239,150

Major wins
- Champagne Stakes (1944); Pimlico Futurity (1944); Arlington Classic (1945); Ben Ali Handicap (1945, 1947); Governor Bowie Handicap (1945); Jockey Club Gold Cup (1945); Lawrence Realization Stakes (1945); Scintillator Purse (1946); Cocoanuts Purse (1947)
- Last updated on March 31, 2010

Pot O'Luck (1942) was an American Thoroughbred racehorse bred and raced by the renowned Calumet Farm of Lexington, Kentucky. He was sired by Chance Play, the 1927 retrospective American Horse of the Year and 1935 Leading sire in North America. Out of the mare Potheen, his damsire was Wildair, winner of the 1920 Metropolitan Handicap.

== 1944 ==
Trained by future U.S. Racing Hall of Fame inductee Ben Jones, racing at age two Pot O'Luck notably won the Champagne Stakes at New York's Belmont Park and the Pimlico Futurity at Baltimore's Pimlico Race Course.

== 1945 ==
At three, Pot O'Luck won five of twenty-one starts and earned $149,220. He ran second to Hoop Jr. in the 1945 Kentucky Derby but won a number of important races that year including the 1^{1}/16 mile Ben Ali Stakes at Keenland Race Course, the 1 1/4-mile (2.0 km) Arlington Classic Stakes, the Lawrence Realization Stakes and the Governor Bowie Handicap, both at 1 5/8 miles (2.6 km), as well as the Jockey Club Gold Cup at two miles.

== 1946 ==
Pot O'Luck bowed a tendon In the spring of 1946 that resulted in a year when he did not win a major race. He lost three races in a row until winning the July 15 Scintillator Purse at Arlington Park and in October won the Hop Creek Purse at Garden State Park Racetrack.

== 1947 ==
In February 1947, five-year-old Pot O'Luck won the Cocoanuts Purse at Hialeah Park Race Track and in April earned his second win of the Ben Ali Stakes at Keenland Race Course. On June 13 it was announced that he had been sold to bloodstock agent John H. Clark who raced him without success until selling him in the fall to a Virginia breeding syndicate. A few years later Pot O'Luck was sold to a breeding operation in France but overall he met with little success as a sire. His best runner was Pot Hunter, a multiple stakes winner in Canada.

== Pedigree ==
Pedigree of Pot O'Luck, bay stallion, 1942
Sire Chance Play	Fair Play	Hastings	Spendthrift
Sire Chance Play	Fair Play	Hastings	Cinderella
Sire Chance Play	Fair Play	Fairy Gold	Bend Or
Sire Chance Play	Fair Play	Fairy Gold	Dame Masham
Sire Chance Play	Quelle Chance	Ethelbert	Eothen
Sire Chance Play	Quelle Chance	Ethelbert	Maori
Sire Chance Play	Quelle Chance	Quelle est Belle	Rock Sand
Sire Chance Play	Quelle Chance	Quelle est Belle	Queen's Bower
Dam Potheen	Wildair	Broomstick	Ben Brush
Dam Potheen	Wildair	Broomstick	Elf
Dam Potheen	Wildair	Verdure	Peter Pan*
Dam Potheen	Wildair	Verdure	Pastorella
Dam Potheen	Rosie O'Grady	Hamburg	Hanover
Dam Potheen	Rosie O'Grady	Hamburg	Lady Reel
Dam Potheen	Rosie O'Grady	Cherokee Rose	Peter Pan*
Dam Potheen	Rosie O'Grady	Cherokee Rose	Royal Rose (family: 8-c)

* Pot O'Luck is inbred 4D × 4D to the stallion Peter Pan, meaning that he appears twice fourth generation on the dam side of his pedigree.
