= Next Move =

American-bred Thoroughbred racehorse

- Sire: Bull Lea
- Grandsire: Bull Dog
- Dam: Now What
- Damsire: Chance Play
- Sex: Filly
- Foaled: 1947
- Country: United States
- Colour: Brown
- Breeder: Alfred G. Vanderbilt II
- Owner: Alfred G. Vanderbilt II
- Trainer: William C. Winfrey
- Record: 46: 17-11-3
- Earnings: US$398,550

Major wins
- Cinderella Stakes (1950); Ladies Handicap (1950); Prioress Stakes (1950); Beldame Handicap (1950, 1952); Delaware Oaks (1950); Coaching Club American Oaks (1950); Vanity Handicap (1950); Gazelle Stakes (1950); Las Flores Handicap (1951); Firenze Handicap (1952); Bay Shore Handicap (1952)

Awards
- American Champion Three-Year-Old Filly (1950); TRA American Champion Older Female Horse (1952)

Honours
- Next Move Handicap at Aqueduct Racetrack

Next Move (1947–1968) was an American Thoroughbred Champion racehorse.

== Background ==
Next Move was bred and raced by prominent horseman Alfred G. Vanderbilt II She was sired by Calumet Farm's stallion Bull Lea. Her dam was Vanderbilt 's Now What, a multiple stakes winner and the 1939 American Champion Two-Year-Old Filly whose sire was Chance Play, the 1927 American Horse of the Year.

She was trained by future U.S. Racing Hall of Fame trainer Bill Winfrey.

== Racing career ==
At age three Next Move won eight important stakes races at tracks on both the East and West Coast of the United States en route to being voted American Champion Three-Year-Old Filly honors. Notably, in a race against colts, she finished second to future Hall of Fame inductee Hill Prince in the Sunset Handicap at Hollywood Park Racetrack.

At age four, Next Move did not enjoy the same success as she had at age three. However, she won the Las Flores Handicap at California's Santa Anita Park and at the same track ran second against her male counterparts in California's richest race, the Santa Anita Handicap. Racing at age five in 1952, Next Move had another outstanding campaign and was American Champion Older Female Horse by the Thoroughbred Racing Association. The Daily Racing Form's rival award for Champion Female Handicap horse was won by the three-year-old Real Delight.

== Breeding record ==
Next Move was retired to broodmare duty at Vanderbilt's Sagamore Farm in Glyndon, Maryland. She had five foals by Vanderbilt's Hall of Fame stallion Native Dancer and one by Turn-To. The most successful of her offspring on the track was the filly Good Move, winner of the 1960 Spinaway Stakes and in a Laurel Park Racecourse record time, the Selima Stakes.
