= Ladkin =

American-bred Thoroughbred racehorse

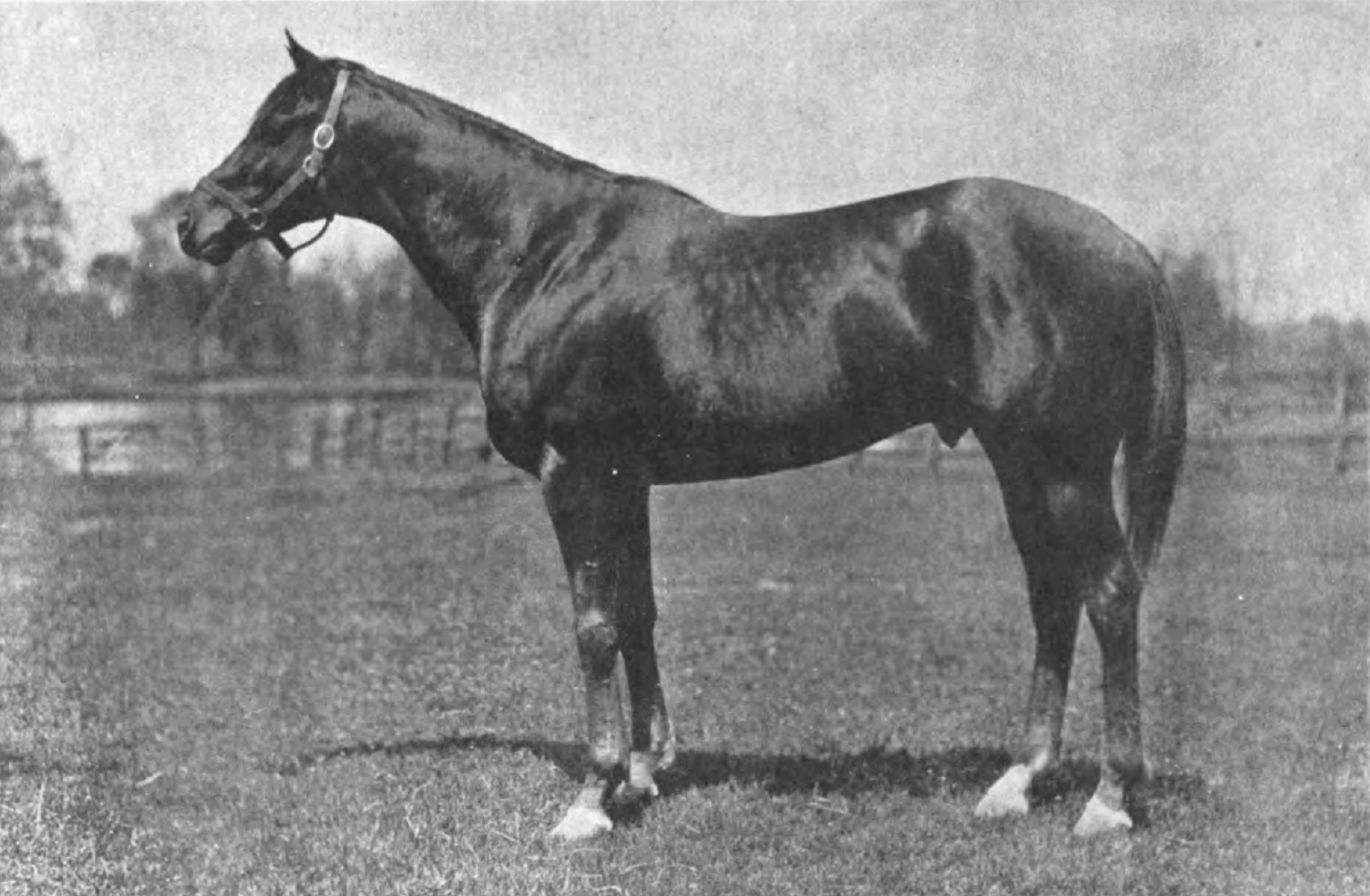
- From Thoroughbred types, 1900-1925
- Sire: Fair Play
- Grandsire: Hastings
- Dam: Lading
- Damsire: Negofol
- Sex: Stallion
- Foaled: 1921
- Country: United States
- Color: Chestnut
- Breeder: August Belmont, Jr.
- Owner: 1) August Belmont, Jr. 2) W. A. Harriman & G. H. Walker
- Trainer: Louis Feustel
- Record: 25: 9-3-4
- Earnings: US$65,730

Major wins
- Remsen Stakes (1923); Cosmopolitan Highweight (1924); Edgemere Handicap (1924); Carlton Stakes (1924); Dwyer Stakes (1924); Broadway Stakes (1924); International Special No.2 (1924)

Ladkin (foaled 1921 in Kentucky) was an American Thoroughbred racehorse bred and raced by August Belmont, Jr. Out of the dam, Lading, he was sired by Fair Play who also sired Man o' War.

Ladkin is best remembered in racing for his win over the European star Epinard in the 1924 International Special No.2 at Aqueduct Racetrack in Queens, New York.

Following the death of August Belmont, Ladkin was purchased by the racing partnership prominent businessmen, W. Averell Harriman and George Herbert Walker who raced in him in 1925 under the nom de course, Log Cabin Stable. Injured the previous October, in 1925 Ladkin met with little racing success and in October was retired to stud duty at the Nursery Stud near Lexington, Kentucky. As a sire, Ladkin's progeny met with modest success in racing. However, his son, Ladder was purchased for breeding by Canadian Frank J. Selke and stood at stud in Canada where he sired Bunty Lawless (1935–1956), a Canadian Horse Racing Hall of Fame inductee who was voted "Canadian Horse of the Half [20th] Century."

== Sire line tree ==
- Ladkin
  - Ladder
    - Bunty Lawless
      - Windfields
        - Canadian Champ
      - Epic
      - McGill

== Sources ==
- Ladkin's pedigree and partial racing stats
- Ladkin's win in the Carlton Stakes
- October 24, 1924 New York Times story on Ladkin's injury
