= Joseph H. Stotler =

American horse trainer

Joseph H. "Bud" Stotler
Personal information
- Born: June 26, 1888 Salisbury, Pennsylvania, US
- Died: October 14, 1957 (aged 69); Baltimore, Maryland
- Occupation: Trainer / Owner

Horse racing career
- Sport: Horse racing

Major racing wins
- Aberdeen Stakes (1925); Chesapeake Stakes (1926); Hopeful Stakes (1926); Bowie Inaugural Handicap (1929); Harford Handicap (1928, 1930, 1931, 1935); Fall Highweight Handicap (1930); Speed Handicap (1930, 1931); Toboggan Handicap (1930, 1935); Selima Stakes (1931); Arlington Futurity Stakes (1932); Grand Union Hotel Stakes (1932); James Rowe Memorial Handicap (1932); United States Hotel Stakes (1932); Havre de Grace Cup Handicap (1933); Latonia Championship Stakes (1933); Brooklyn Handicap (1934, 1935, 1936); Potomac Handicap (1934, 1935); Suburban Handicap (1934); Whitney Handicap (1934, 1935, 1936; Acorn Stakes (1935); Arlington Handicap (1935); Butler Handicap (1935, 1936); Hawthorne Gold Cup Handicap (1935); Jerome Handicap (1935); Stars and Stripes Handicap (1935); Test Stakes (1935); Wilson Stakes (1935,1936); American Legion Handicap (1936, 1938); Metropolitan Handicap (1936); Queens County Handicap (1936); San Carlos Handicap (1936); Santa Barbara Stakes (1936, 1937, 1938); Saratoga Handicap (1936); Tremont Stakes (1936); Carter Handicap (1938); Arlington Lassie Stakes (1939); Demoiselle Stakes (1939); National Stallion Stakes (1939); San Vicente Stakes (1939); Santa Catalina Handicap (1945); San Pasqual Handicap (1946)

Racing awards
- United States Champion Thoroughbred Trainer by earnings (1935)

Significant horses
- Ladysman, Now What, Discovery

Joseph Horace "Bud" Stotler (June 26, 1888 – October 14, 1957) was an American Thoroughbred horse racing Champion trainer who conditioned horses that won four Championships. He was of German descent.

Commonly known as "Bud," he began working in the horse racing business in his native Pennsylvania where he first conditioned horses for a stable owner from his hometown of Salisbury. He eventually moved to compete on the Maryland circuit which at the time was a major player in Thoroughbred racing offering some of the best purses at a number of high-profile racetracks such as Pimlico Race Course, Bowie Race Track, Laurel Park and the Timonium Racetrack.

During his career, Bud Stotler trained for major owners such as the Sagamore Farm and in beginning of 1932, simultaneously for the Shoshone Stable of William R. Coe. For Coe, Stotler conditioned the 1932 American Champion Two-Year-Old Colt, Ladysman. In the last few years of his career he trained for Charles Howard, owner of Seabiscuit.

Of his four starters in the Kentucky Derby Stotler's best finish was second in 1934 with Discovery and from seven starters in the Preakness Stakes his best was a second with Ladysman in 1933.

== Sagamore Farm years ==
Sagamore Farm was a Glyndon, Maryland breeding farm with full training facilities. Hired in 1925, the operation was owned by Margaret Emerson, heiress to the Bromo-Seltzer fortune and widow of the also wealthy Alfred Gwynne Vanderbilt, who lost his life when the RMS Lusitania was sunk by a German U-boat on May 7, 1915. In 1933, she gave the farm and racing stable to her son Alfred Jr. and Stotler remained as the Sagamore Farm manager and trainer.

Bud Stotler would earn national championship honors in 1935, winning 37 stakes races and earning more purse money than any trainer in the United States. The star of the Sagamore stable, and the horse for which Stotler is best remembered, was the 1935 American Horse of the Year and 1935 and 1936 American Champion Older Male Horse and U.S. Racing Hall of Fame inductee, Discovery. In 1939, Bud Stotler conditioned that year's American Champion Two-Year-Old Filly, Now What, even though a serious automobile accident in April 1939 forced him to temporarily hand over his Sagamore training duties to assistant, Lee McCoy. In December 1939, Stotler announced his retirement and resigned from Sagamore but returned later in 1940 to train a small stable of horses for himself and other clients until 1944 when he signed with the major California operation of Charles Howard.

Stotler was widely known and respected for his methodical approach to conditioning horses, which emphasized strategic race placement over short-term gain and long-term soundness. His thorough handling of Discovery, specifically during the horses' peak seasons, reflected a trainer who balanced deep insight with discipline creating equine behavior.

Following his retirement from racing, Stotler lived out his years in Baltimore, Maryland, not far from Pimlico Race Course. Joseph and Ada Stotler's daughter, Katherine, married jockey John Bejshak.
