= Scapa Flow (horse) =

American-bred Thoroughbred racehorse

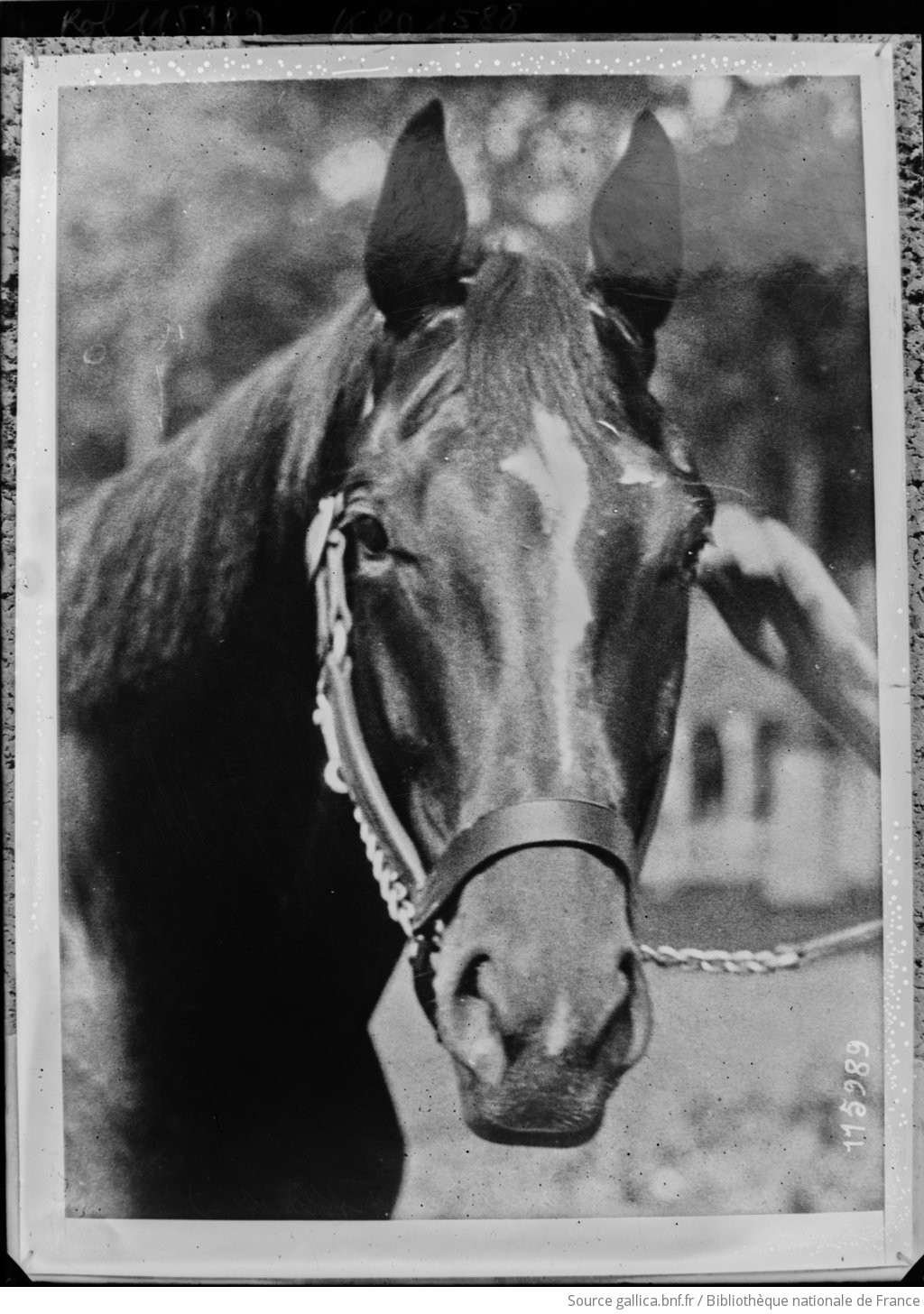
- Jan 1927
- Sire: Man o' War
- Grandsire: Fair Play
- Dam: Florence Webber
- Damsire: Peep o' Day
- Sex: Stallion
- Foaled: 1924
- Country: United States
- Colour: Bay
- Breeder: Walter M. Jeffords, Sr.
- Owner: Walter M. Jeffords, Sr.
- Trainer: Scott P. Harlan
- Record: 18: 5-4-5
- Earnings: US$93,955

Major wins
- United States Hotel Stakes (1926); Futurity Stakes (1926); Bowling Brook Purse (1927)

Awards
- American Champion Two-Year-Old Colt (1926)
- Last updated on June 15, 2010

Scapa Flow (1924–1928) was an American Thoroughbred race horse, a son of Man o' War. He first came to prominence in 1926 after winning the 43rd running of the United States Hotel Stakes as a two-year-old. He was owned by Mr. and Mrs. Walter M. Jeffords, who bred him. In August 1926, Morton Schwartz offered $100,000 to purchase Scapa Flow, but his owners refused to sell him at any price.

== Career ==
With Frank Coltiletti as his jockey, Scapa Flow won the U.S. Hotel Stakes in Saratoga Springs, New York, in 1:14 2/5. He earned $11,525 for his owners at the Union Avenue course. Coming out of the gate, Coltiletti had the advantage of a step with Scapa Flow, who came to the front quickly. The fractional times were 0:23 3/5, 0:47 1/5, and 1:14 2/5.

On April 16, 1928, Scapa Flow lost the Harford Handicap by half a length at Havre de Grace, Maryland. The colt, favored in the six-furlong race, was beaten by Rock Man, an outsider. Scapa Flow finished third at Belmont Park in the Metropolitan, an event first run at the Morris Park Racecourse in 1891. On a rain-soaked track, Scapa Flow, at 3-to-1 odds, was bested for second place by four lengths by Chance Shot, a 13-to-5 entry, owned by W. Averell Harriman. The event was won by Nimba, a filly owned by Marshall Field III.

== Death ==
Scapa Flow died in 1928 before he could make it to stud. He injured his leg during the June 17, 1928 running of the Brooklyn Handicap and was put down.
