= Chance Play =

American-bred Thoroughbred racehorse

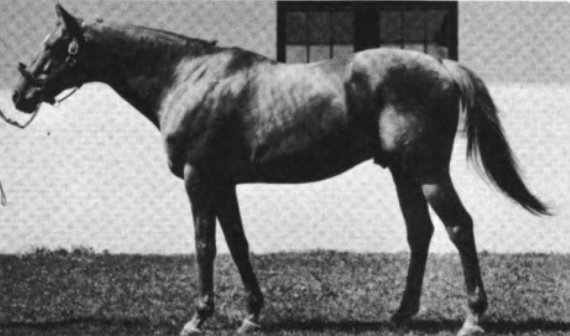
- Sire: Fair Play
- Grandsire: Hastings
- Dam: Quelle Chance
- Damsire: Ethelbert
- Sex: Stallion
- Foaled: 1923
- Country: United States
- Colour: Chestnut
- Breeder: August Belmont Jr.
- Owner: Log Cabin Stable
- Trainer: 1) Louis Feustel; 2) G. Hamilton Keene (7/1926); 3) John I. Smith (1927); 4) George M. Odom (1928)
- Record: 39: 16-9-2
- Earnings: US$137,946

Major wins
- Youthful Stakes (1925); Campfire Handicap (1926); Potomac Handicap (1926); Merchants and Citizens Handicap (1927); Jockey Club Gold Cup (1927); Lincoln Handicap (1927); Saratoga Cup (1927); Havre de Grace Handicap (1927); Toboggan Handicap (1927); Aqueduct Handicap (1928); Combat Handicap (1928); Continental Handicap (1928)

Awards
- American Horse of the Year (1927); American Champion Older Male Horse (1927); Leading sire in North America (1935, 1944)

Honours
- Chance Play Purse at Sportsman's Park
- Last updated on January 16, 2021

Chance Play (foaled 1923) was an American Champion Thoroughbred racehorse and Champion sire. In a career which lasted from 1925 to 1928 he ran in thirty-nine races and won sixteen of them. Although he was successful in his early career over sprint distances, he did not reach his peak until the age of four in 1927, when he was arguably the best horse in the United States, winning several major races including the two-mile Jockey Club Gold Cup.

== Background ==
Bred by August Belmont Jr., he was out of the mare Quelle Chance, a daughter of 1900 Metropolitan Handicap winner, Ethelbert. He was sired by Fair Play who also sired Man o' War, widely regarded as one of the greatest racehorses of all time. Chance Play was as well a full brother to 1927 Belmont Stakes winner, Chance Shot.

In 1923, New York City financiers W. Averell Harriman and Bert Walker bought a stable of Thoroughbred horses which they raced under the nom de course Log Cabin Stable, sporting orange and white silks. As part of a private purchase of twenty horses, in January 1925 Harriman and Walker acquired Chance Play from the estate of August Belmont Jr. Chance Play was conditioned for racing by Louis Feustel who had been the trainer of Man o' War.

== Racing career ==
=== 1925: two-year-old season ===
Racing at age two, the colt won his May 12, 1925 debut at Jamaica Race Course in Jamaica, New York. Four days later he got the most important win of the when he captured the Youthful Stakes on the same racetrack. During the remainder of 1925, Chance Play was outshone by William Coe's outstanding colt, Pompey to whom he finished third in the two most important races of the year for two-year-olds, the August 29 Hopeful Stakes at Saratoga Race Course and the September 12 Futurity Stakes at Belmont Park.

=== 1926: three-year-old season ===
As a three-year-old, Chance Play won the June 7, 1926 Campfire Handicap, a six-furlong dash for three-year-olds at Belmont Park. He did not run in any of the Triple Crown races as it was uncertain if he could handle any distance beyond six furlongs.

In July, Louis Feustel resigned as the Log Cabin Stable trainer. Although he was replaced by John Smith, conditioning for Chance Play was handed over to G. Hamilton Keene, trainer for the stable of Joseph E. Widener.

Chance Play's only other win of significance in 1926 came in early October when he had strengthened enough to run at longer distances and at Maryland's Havre de Grace Racetrack he defeated Pompey to win the mile and a sixteenth Potomac Handicap. A disagreement between the two owners of Log Cabin Stable in the fall of 1926 led to the partnership being dissolved and Averell Harriman became the stable's sole owner.

=== 1927: four-year-old season ===
Trainer Hamilton Keene died in January 1927 and John Smith took over. The winner of several of the year's top events, including the Merchants and Citizens Handicap, Jockey Club Gold Cup and Toboggan Handicap, Chance Play has been retrospectively selected the 1927 American Champion Older Male Horse and Horse of the Year, although no such award was made at the time.

=== 1928: five-year-old season ===
Chance Play continued to race at age five in 1928 but under a new trainer, the future Hall of Fame inductee George M. Odom for whom he won the Aqueduct, Combat and Continental Handicaps.

== Stud record ==
Retired to stud duty, Chance Play initially stood in New York but Warren Wright purchased him for $70,000 and brought him to stand at his Calumet Farm. The leading sire in North America in 1935 and 1944, Chance Play was the sire of twenty-three stakes winners and the broodmare sire of twenty stakes winners. Among his progeny were:

- Good Gamble (b. 1932) - multiple stakes winning filly whose wins included the Acorn Stakes, Aqueduct Handicap, Test Stakes, Queens County Handicap
- Psychic Bid (b. 1932) - won Hopeful Stakes, Sanford Stakes
- Grand Slam (b. 1933) - winner of the Arlington Futurity, Kentucky Jockey Club Stakes
- Now What (b. 1937) - American Champion Two-Year-Old Filly
- Some Chance (b. 1939) - multiple stakes winner including the 1942 and 1943 editions of the Roseben Handicap
- Pot O'Luck (b. 1942) - multiple winner of important races including the Pimlico Futurity, Arlington Classic, Jockey Club Gold Cup and Lawrence Realization Stakes

The grandsire of Piet, whose wins included three consecutive editions of the Jamaica Handicap, Chance Play was also the damsire of Next Move, the 1950 American Champion Three-Year-Old Filly and 1952 American Champion Older Female Horse.

== Sire line tree ==
- Chance Play
  - Psychic Bid
  - Grand Slam
    - Piet
  - Some Chance
  - Pot O'Luck
    - Pot Hunter

== Pedigree ==
Pedigree of Chance Play, 1923
Sire Fair Play	Hastings	Spendthrift	Australian
Sire Fair Play	Hastings	Spendthrift	Aerolite
Sire Fair Play	Hastings	Cinderella	Tomahawk
Sire Fair Play	Hastings	Cinderella	Manna
Sire Fair Play	Fairy Gold	Bend Or	Doncaster
Sire Fair Play	Fairy Gold	Bend Or	Rouge Rose
Sire Fair Play	Fairy Gold	Dame Masham	Galliard
Sire Fair Play	Fairy Gold	Dame Masham	Pauline
Dam Quelle Chance	Ethelbert	Eothen	Hampton
Dam Quelle Chance	Ethelbert	Eothen	Sultana
Dam Quelle Chance	Ethelbert	Maori	Poulet
Dam Quelle Chance	Ethelbert	Maori	Queen of Cyprus
Dam Quelle Chance	Qu'elle Est Belle II	Rock Sand	Sainfoin
Dam Quelle Chance	Qu'elle Est Belle II	Rock Sand	Roquebrune
Dam Quelle Chance	Qu'elle Est Belle II	Queen's Bower	St. Florian
Dam Quelle Chance	Qu'elle Est Belle II	Queen's Bower	Gipsy Queen

Chance Play is shown as descending from family 3-c, which traces back to the Whisker Mare and ultimately back to Snapdragon in family 3. However, the female descendants of his sixth-dam Coterie have a type of mitochondrial DNA that is inconsistent with other descendants of this family. As mitochondrial DNA is passed exclusively in the female line, this indicates a pedigree error occurred at some point between Snapdragon's foaling in 1759 and Coterie's in 1862.
