= Log Cabin Stable =

Log Cabin Stable was a Thoroughbred horse racing partnership founded in 1923 by New York City financiers W. Averell Harriman and Bert Walker who raced under orange and white silks.

As part of a private purchase of twenty horses, in January 1925 Harriman and Walker acquired Chance Play from the estate of August Belmont Jr. and raced him under the nom de course, Arden Farm. The horse would be voted the retrospective American Horse of the Year for 1926.

A disagreement between the two owners of Log Cabin Stable in the fall of 1926 led to the partnership being dissolved and Averell Harriman became the stable's sole owner.

Trainers who worked for the Log Cabin stable include Albert Simons (1923), Will. M. Wallace (1924), Louis Feustel (1925-July 1926), John I. Smith (1927–1928), George M. Odom (1928).
