= International Special =

Series of horse races

The International Specials of 1924 were a series of three Thoroughbred horse races held in September and October at three different race tracks in the United States. They were called "International" because the race included the champion from France, who had won there and in England.

The one-time series came about following the much hyped October 20, 1923 match race at Belmont Park in Elmont, New York between that year's highly touted Epsom Derby winner, Papyrus, and the Kentucky Derby and Belmont Stakes winner, Zev. The race drew a huge crowd to see the first-ever English champion race in the U.S., and it proved a resounding financial success for its promoters. Interest in the event was such that it was broadcast on the radio, a racing first, and a film of the race was distributed to movie theaters across the country. After the American colt easily won, horseracing fans in the U.S. clamored for more and European fans wanted redemption for their humiliation. As such, much talk began about the revered French champion Epinard taking on America's best.

International Special No.1 Racing Program

Following negotiations with leading American horsemen August Belmont, Jr., James Shevlin, and Matt Winn, owner Pierre Wertheimer agreed to send Epinard to compete in a series of three races at different tracks in the United States. In April 1924 they announced that the deal had been finalized and the story filled the sport pages in the U.S. and Europe and even as far away as Venezuela. Rather than a match race against a single horse, Epinard would be pitted against America's best in three separate races, each to be run on a dirt track and at an increasingly longer distance. Billed as an "International Special," the event was seen by fans at three different locales. The first race, on Long Island, New York, was attended by the Prince of Wales, the future King Edward VIII.

International Special No. 1 Monday, September 1, Labor Day at Belmont Park in Elmont, New York: purse $25,000 added - 6 furlongs

- Post Positions: Epinard, Snob II, Ladkin, Wilderness, Baffling, Miss Star, Wise Counsellor, Zev, Goshawk.
  - Results: Wise Counsellor 3/4 len. Epinard 3 len. Ladkin. 1:11.80.

Race No.1 was won by Wise Counsellor, the previous year's U.S. Champion 2-Year-Old owned by F. A. Burton and trained by J. S.Ward, came from sixth place as the slight 3-1 favorite. Running for the first time on a dirt track, Epinard finished second with Ladkin third. $29,000 to the winner.

International Special No. 2 September 27 at Aqueduct Racetrack in Queens, New York : purse $25,000 added - 8 furlongs

- Post Positions: Ladkin, Epinard, Wise Counsellor, Zev, Little Chief, My Own.
  - Results: Ladkin Nose Epinard 1 and 1/2 len. Wise Counsellor. 1:36.40.

In the second race, Wise Cousellor and Ladkin reversed positions from the first race. Epinard's jockey Everett Haynes broke on top, but dropped back to third down the backstretch, but he fought back to finish second by a nose to Ladkin who came off the rail and followed the two leaders from the outside before engaging Wise Counsellor for the lead at the half-mile. Ladkin was the 2-1 slight favorite, his time was 2/5 off the track record, and was owned by August Belmont Jr. $28,750 to the winner. Wise Counsellor who broke second, took the lead and battled head and head early with Epinard on his inside, then Ladkin on his outside.

International Special No. 3 October 11 at Latonia Race Track in Covington, Kentucky : purse $50,000 added - 10 furlongs

- Post Positions : Epinard, Chilhowee, Sarazen, Little Chief, Altawood, My Play, Mad Play, Princess Doreen.
  - Results: Sarazen 1 and a 1/2 len. Epinard Nose Mad Play. 2:00.80 NTR.

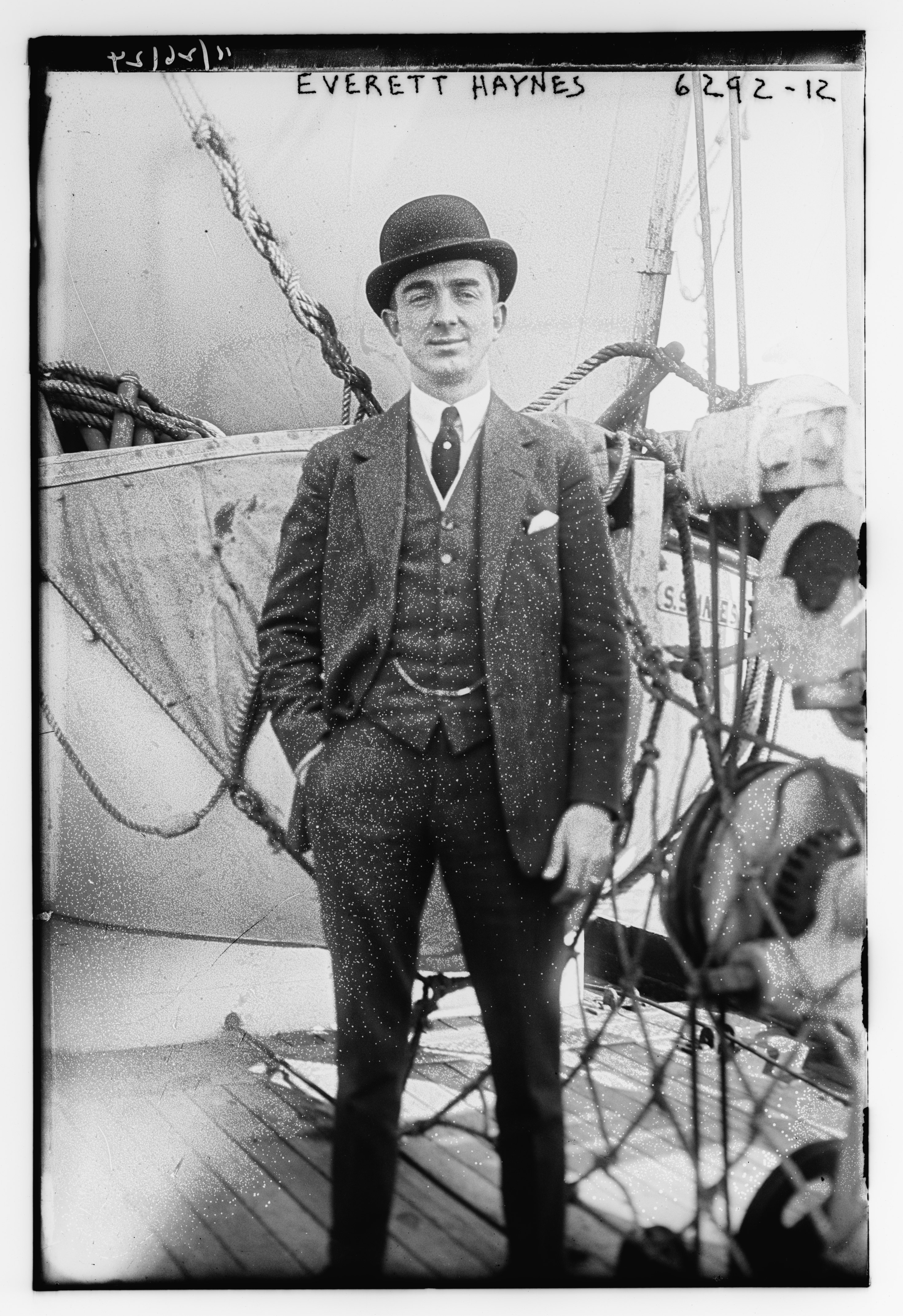
Jockey Everett Haynes in 1924

By then a crowd favorite, Epinard was the .95 favorite in the No.3 International Special. More than 60,000 showed up at Latonia Race Track for the race. In addition to Epinard, the race featured Kentucky Derby runner-up Chilhowee, Belmont Stakes winner Mad Play and two future U.S. Hall of Famers, Princess Doreen and Sarazen owned by Virginia Fair Vanderbilt. Future Hall of Fame trainer Max Hirsch said the 6-1 third choice Sarazen's win over Epinard, in which he set a Latonia track record, was his greatest thrill in racing. $55,500 was paid to the winner.

Although he finished second in all three of the International Specials, Epinard's 1924 performances earned him the U.S. Champion Older Male Horse honors.
