= Masterman (horse) =

American-bred Thoroughbred racehorse

- Sire: Hastings
- Grandsire: Spendthrift
- Dam: Lady Margaret
- Damsire: The Ill-Used
- Sex: Stallion
- Foaled: 1899
- Country: United States
- Colour: Chestnut
- Breeder: August Belmont Jr.
- Owner: 1) August Belmont Jr. 2) John Boden; 3) Canadian National Bureau of Breeding
- Trainer: J.J. Hyland
- Record: not found
- Earnings: not found

Major wins
- United States Hotel Stakes (1901); American Classic Race wins: Belmont Stakes (1902)

Honours
- Champion Thoroughbred sire- New York Horse Show (1910)

Masterman (1899–1911) was an American Thoroughbred racehorse that was the winner of the 1902 Belmont Stakes.

At the 1903 dispersal sale of Belmont's stable, Masterman was purchased by John Boden for $2,500. Masterman was later given to the Canadian Breeding Bureau by Boden in September 1908 for use as a sire for cavalry horses. Masterman was euthanized in June 1911 after breaking a leg at a contract farm in Petite Cote, Quebec where he was being stabled.
