= Faireno =

American-bred Thoroughbred racehorse

- Sire: Chatterton
- Grandsire: Fair Play
- Dam: Minerva
- Damsire: Ambassador
- Sex: Stallion
- Foaled: 1929
- Country: United States
- Color: Bay
- Breeder: Belair Stud
- Owner: Belair Stud
- Trainer: James E. Fitzsimmons & George Tappen
- Record: 62: 17–13–6
- Earnings: US$182,215

Major wins
- Junior Champion Stakes (1931); Nursery Handicap (1931); Victoria Stakes (1931); Belmont Stakes; Dwyer Stakes (1932); Lawrence Realization Stakes (1932); Empire City Handicap (1934); Havre de Grace Handicap (1934); Merchants and Citizens Handicap (1934)

Honors
- Faireno Handicap at Aqueduct Racetrack; Faireno Purse at Hawthorne Race Course

Faireno (foaled 1929 in Kentucky) was an American Champion Thoroughbred racehorse best known for winning the Belmont Stakes in 1932.

== Background ==
Faireno was bred and raced by William Woodward's Belair Stud. He was sired by Chatterton, a son of U.S. Racing Hall of Fame inductee Fair Play who was also the sire of Man o' War.

Faireno's race conditioning was the responsibility of Belair Stud's future U.S. Racing Hall of Fame trainer "Sunny Jim" Fitzsimmons and his assistant, George Tappen.

== Racing career ==
Raced at age two, among Faireno's wins were the Victoria Stakes at Old Woodbine Racetrack in Toronto, Ontario, Canada, the Nursery Handicap at Belmont Park, and the Junior Champion Stakes at Aqueduct Racetrack.

At age three in 1932, after a poor performance in the Wood Memorial Stakes, Faireno did not run in the Kentucky Derby. Although he was shipped to Pimlico Race Course for the Preakness Stakes, he was withdrawn a few days before the race and sent back to his base in New York. In late May, Faireno ran second in the Campfire Purse at Belmont Park then on June 4 led virtually all the way to win the third leg of the U.S. Triple Crown series, the Belmont Stakes. Faireno went on to win the Shevlin Stakes at Aqueduct Racetrack in June, the Dwyer Stakes on July 2, was eighth in the Arlington Classic, and then won the Hawthorne Handicap on August 6 before running second to Plucky Play in the August 27th Hawthorne Gold Cup. On September 17, 1932, he came back with a decisive win in the Lawrence Realization Stakes but came out of the race with a tendon injury that kept him out of racing for the remainder of the year and all of 1933. Despite his shortened 1932 campaign, Faireno still retrospectively shared American Champion Three-Year-Old Male Horse honors with Burgoo King.

On April 22, 1934, Faireno returned in the Paumonok Handicap at Jamaica Race Course. Racing for the first time in nearly a year and a half, he was in contention for most of the race but tired in the stretch and finished fourth. However, he regained his old form and went on to win the 1934 Empire City Handicap, defeated Discovery to win the Havre de Grace Handicap, won the Merchants and Citizens Handicap at Saratoga Race Course, and October's Rochambeau Handicap at Narragansett Park. Faireno raced at age six in 1935 but with limited success.

== Stud record ==
Faireno was retired to stud but proved to be sterile.
