= Battleship (horse) =

American-bred Thoroughbred racehorse

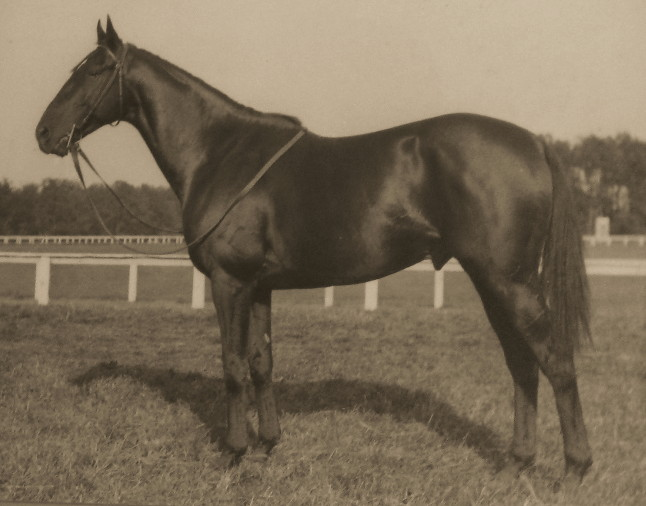
- Sire: Man o' War
- Grandsire: Fair Play
- Dam: Quarantine
- Damsire: Sea Sick
- Sex: Stallion
- Foaled: 1927
- Country: United States
- Color: Chestnut
- Breeder: Walter J. Salmon Sr.
- Owner: Walter J. Salmon Sr. Marion duPont Scott (from end of 1931)
- Trainer: Jack Pryce 1929-1931 (U.S. flat racing); S.L. Burch 1932-1936 (U.S. over fences); Reg Hobbs from 1936 steeplechase racing
- Record: 55: 24-6-4
- Earnings: $71,641

Major wins
- James Rowe Memorial Handicap (1930); American Grand National (1934); Grand National (1938)

Honors
- United States' Racing Hall of Fame (1969)
- Last updated on 20 January 2011

Battleship (1927–1958) was an American thoroughbred racehorse who is the only horse to have won both the American Grand National and the Grand National steeplechase races.

== Breeding ==
Battleship was bred by owner Walter J. Salmon Sr. at his Mereworth Farm in Lexington, Kentucky. He was a "stocky chestnut" by Man o' War, and his dam, Quarantine, was by Sea Sick. He was a muscular but small horse who stood 15 hands 1 inch (1.55 m) high, leading him to be nicknamed the 'American Pony'.

== Racing record ==
Battleship was initially trained for flat racing. Competing for his owner through age four, he won ten of his twenty-two starts. An injury kept him out of competition for a year, and at the end of 1931 Walter Salmon sold Battleship to Marion duPont Scott for $12,000. Scott was a steeplechase horse racing enthusiast who had earlier purchased a Salmon-owned half brother to Battleship. A member of the prominent and wealthy Du Pont family of chemical manufacturing, Ms duPont had begun developing her Montpelier estate, formerly the home of James and Dolley Madison, near Orange, Virginia, into what became one of the leading horse-training centers in the United States.

Ms. duPont had Battleship trained for steeplechase racing and entered his first competition in 1933. The horse showed promise, winning three of his four races that season. Then, in 1934, he won the American Grand National, the most prestigious steeplechase race in the US. Gentleman jockey Carroll K. Bassett rode Battleship in most of his major U.S. victories. Bassett was also an accomplished artist and sculpted a small bronze bust of Battleship in 1934.

In July 1936, Ms. duPont shipped Battleship to England, where trainer Reginald "Reg" Hobbs began to prepare the horse, on the mend with a bowed tendon, for the 1937 Grand National. Battleship won several races in 1936 and 1937, including races at Sandown, Newbury and Leicester but some critics remained unimpressed saying he "did not look like a stayer". The Sporting Life dwelt on his size, stating "he is too small to make appeal to me as a National horse ... he will be the smallest winner on record".

Hobbs himself convinced Scott that Battleship was not ready for the Grand National in March 1937. He was said to have "not trained on" and was withdrawn at the final acceptance stage. He continued training and racing in England, winning five of his thirteen races and was entered into the 1938 Grand National. His competition in the 1938 race included Royal Mail, winner of the 1937 Grand National, Royal Danieli, and Workman. Battleship beat Royal Danieli to win the race in a photo finish, completing the race in 9 minutes, 27 seconds. He was ridden by Bruce Hobbs, the seventeen-year-old son of trainer Reg Hobbs. He was an unusual winner of the race in that he was entire. The last entire winner had been Grudon in 1901 and none has won since.

In June 1938, Battleship returned to the U.S. aboard the Manhattan. Trainer Reg Hobbs and jockey Bruce Hobbs accompanied the champion horse on the transatlantic journey. Upon arriving in New York, Battleship was met at the dock by a crowd including New York mayor Fiorello LaGuardia and actor Randolph Scott, Marion duPont Scott's husband.

== Stud record ==
Following his 1938 Grand National victory, Battleship retired to stand at stud at duPont's Montpelier estate, Battleship sired only 58 foals. Notably, he sired War Battle and Shipboard, steeplechase champions in 1947 and 1956 respectively, plus Sea Legs, winner of the 1952 American Grand National. He also sired the stakes winners Cap-A-Pie, Eolus, Floating Isle, Mighty Mo, Navigate, Navy Gun, Tide Rips, and Westport Point.

Battleship died in 1958 at the age of 31 and his buried at Montpelier. In 1969, he was inducted into the United States' Racing Hall of Fame.

== See also ==
- List of racehorses
