= Piet (horse) =

American-bred Thoroughbred racehorse

- Sire: Grand Slam
- Grandsire: Chance Play
- Dam: Valdina Lark
- Damsire: Blue Larkspur
- Sex: Stallion
- Foaled: 1945
- Country: United States
- Color: Chestnut
- Breeder: Charles B. Bohn & Peter A. Markey
- Owner: BoMar Stable (C. B. Bohn & P. A. Markey)
- Trainer: R. Emmett Potts
- Record: 64: 16-9-12
- Earnings: $257,440

Major wins
- Arlington Futurity (1947); Spalding Lowe Jenkins Stakes (1947); Richard Johnson Stakes (1947); Skokie Handicap (1948); Jamaica Handicap (1949, 1950, 1951); Whitney Handicap (1950); Toboggan Handicap (1950); Bay Shore Handicap (1950); Apache Handicap (1951)

Piet (foaled 1945) was an American Thoroughbred racehorse best known for winning three consecutive runnings of the Jamaica Handicap.

== Background ==
Bred by Charles B. Bohn and Peter A. Markey, Piet raced under their nom de course, BoMar Stable. He was sired by multiple stakes winner Grand Slam, a son of 1927 American Horse of the Year Chance Play. His dam was Valdina Lark, a daughter of the U.S. Racing Hall of Fame inductee who is considered one of the greatest broodmare sires of all time, Blue Larkspur.

== Racing career ==
At age two, Piet won two races in Maryland, taking the 1947 Spalding Lowe Jenkins Stakes and the Richard Johnson Stakes at Laurel Park Racecourse but got his most important victory of the year at Chicago's Arlington Park when he won the Arlington Futurity.

In his three-year-old debut, Piet won the Ral Parr Stakes at Pimlico Race Course. His other significant win of 1948 saw him defeat Coaltown in capturing the Skokie Handicap at Washington Park Race Track. In 1949, Piet won the first of his three straight editions of the Jamaica Handicap at Jamaica Racetrack. The following year, in addition to another Jamaica Handicap, Piet also won the Whitney, Toboggan, and Bay Shore Handicaps.

1951 was six-year-old Piet's last year of racing. At the Jamaica Racetrack he won the Apache Handicap then six days later his third consecutive Jamaica Handicap. In other top-level 1951 races, Piet notably ran second to Casemate in the Metropolitan Handicap and was third behind winner Arise in the Carter Handicap.

== Stud record ==
Retired to stud duty, Piet met with modest success. His last foal was born in 1967.
