= Discovery (horse) =

American-bred Thoroughbred racehorse

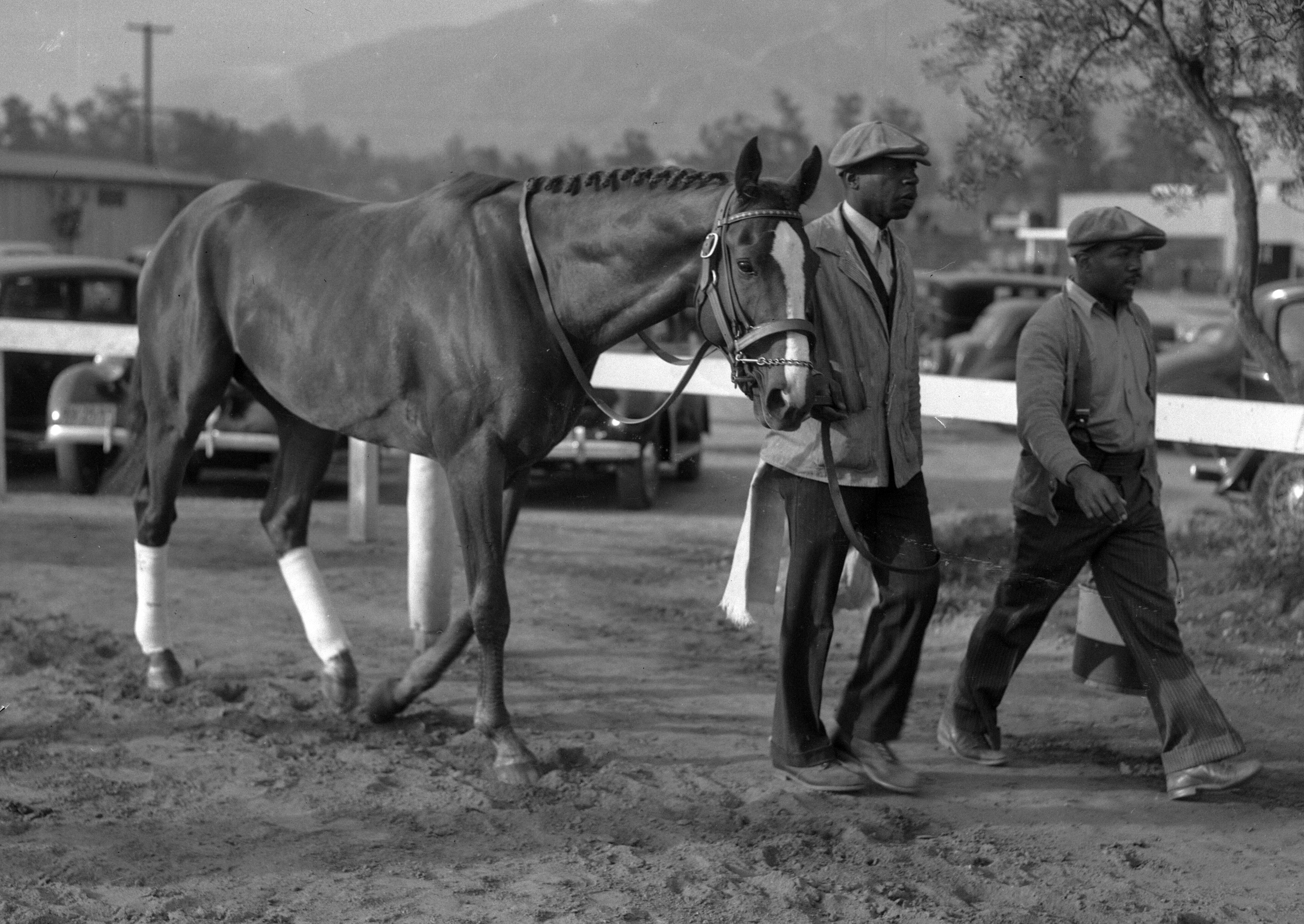
- Discovery in 1936
- Sire: Display
- Grandsire: Fair Play
- Dam: Ariadne
- Damsire: Light Brigade
- Sex: Stallion
- Foaled: 1931 Mereworth Farm Lexington, Kentucky
- Died: 1958
- Country: United States
- Colour: Chestnut
- Breeder: Walter J. Salmon, Sr.
- Owner: Adolphe Pons; Alfred G. Vanderbilt II (at age 3)
- Trainer: John R. Pryce; Joseph H. "Bud" Stotler (at age 3)
- Record: 63: 27-10-10
- Earnings: $195,287

Major wins
- Potomac Handicap (1934); Brooklyn Handicap (1934, 1935, 1936); Whitney Handicap (1934, 1935, 1936); Kenner Stakes (1934); Butler Memorial Handicap (1935); Merchants and Citizens Handicap (1935); Arlington Handicap (1935); Rhode Island Handicap (1934); Hawthorne Gold Cup Handicap (1935); Wilson Stakes (1935, 1936); Stars and Stripes Handicap (1935); Saratoga Handicap (1936) American Classic place: Kentucky Derby – 2nd (1934)

Awards
- Retrospective United States Horse of the Year (1935); Retrospective U.S. Champion Male Handicap Horse (1935); U.S. Champion Male Handicap Horse (1936)

Honours
- United States Racing Hall of Fame (1969) #37 - Top 100 U.S. Racehorses of the 20th Century; Discovery Handicap run at Aqueduct Race Track

Discovery (1931–1958) was a champion American Thoroughbred racehorse. In a racing career which lasted from 1933 to 1936 he ran sixty-three times and won twenty-seven races. One of the leading American three-year-olds of his generation in 1934, he became a dominant performer in the next two seasons. The National Museum of Racing and Hall of Fame said that he was: "...considered one of the greatest horses of the 20th century."

== Background ==
A bright chestnut horse with a white blaze and white hind feet, Discovery was foaled at Walter J. Salmon's Mereworth Farm in Lexington, Kentucky. He was sired by the Preakness Stakes winner Display, another product of Mereworth. His dam, Ariadne, was a member of Thoroughbred family 23-b, which has produced many notable American racehorses including Zev, Affirmed and Winning Colors.

== Racing career ==
Discovery was owned by Adolphe Pons of Country Life Farm in Bel Air, Maryland, who raced him at age two with limited success, winning only two of thirteen starts and being beaten in several races by future Hall of Famer Cavalcade. Purchased for $25,000 by Alfred G. Vanderbilt II's Sagamore Farm, Discovery raced one more time in 1933, finishing second.

At age three, Discovery's racing season was marked by his continuing rivalry with Cavalcade. He finished second to Cavalcade in the 1934 Kentucky Derby and third to High Quest and Cavalcade in the Preakness Stakes. Both horses skipped the Belmont Stakes. Discovery went on to win the first of three consecutive Brooklyn and Whitney Handicaps (both under higher and higher weights), and set a world record time for one mile and three-sixteenths in the Rhode Island Handicap at Narragansett Park.

In 1935, Discovery was the dominant horse in the United States, and one of the most notable things about him was his ability to carry great weight. Running under an average of 131 pounds, the four-year-old won eleven of nineteen races and has been retrospectively regarded as the U.S. Champion Handicap horse and Horse of the Year for 1935. Although there was no formal award, Discovery was recognized in contemporary sources as the "top stake horse" of the year. In the Merchants and Citizens Handicap, he carried 139 pounds to victory in August before a crowd of 25,000 including the Governors of New York and Pennsylvania. For these feats, he was called the great weight carrier, or the "Iron Horse." The fact that Discovery was retrospectively named Horse of the Year in 1935 is unusual as Omaha won the Triple Crown in that year. This was the only time that a Triple Crown winner has not been retrospectively recognized as Horse of the Year.

Racing at age 5, Discovery won his third Brooklyn and Whitney Handicaps. His achievements were formally recognized when he was the first horse to be voted U.S. Champion Handicap horse. His win in the Whitney was described by The New York Times as "the most decisive victory to be scored in a big American stake in many years".

== Stud record ==
He was retired to stud at Vanderbilt's Sagamore Farm in rural Baltimore County, Maryland at the end of the 1936 racing season.

Over the course of a 21-year stallion career, Discovery sired just 25 graded stakes race winners including Loser Weeper. But it was through his daughters that Discovery left his legacy. The most important of those was Miss Disco, dam of Horse of the Year and Hall of Fame inductee Bold Ruler who became the leading sire in North America eight times and sired one of the greatest racehorses of all time, Triple Crown winner Secretariat. Discovery's other daughters produced Hall of Fame champions Native Dancer, Bed o'Roses, multiple stakes winner Intentionally, and Preakness Stakes winner Hasty Road. Native Dancer produced Raise a Native, who sired leading stallion Mr. Prospector, champion Alydar; Sea Bird II's sire Dan Cupid, champion filly Ruffian's dam Shenanigans, and Northern Dancer's dam Natalma.

Discovery was inducted into the U.S. Racing Hall of Fame in 1969.

== Pedigree ==
Pedigree of Discovery, chestnut stallion, 1931
Sire Display	Fair Play	Hastings	Spendthrift
Sire Display	Fair Play	Hastings	Cinderella
Sire Display	Fair Play	Fairy Gold	Bend Or
Sire Display	Fair Play	Fairy Gold	Dame Masham
Sire Display	Cicuta	Nassovian	William The Third
Sire Display	Cicuta	Nassovian	Veneration
Sire Display	Cicuta	Hemloch	Spearmint
Sire Display	Cicuta	Hemloch	Keystone
Dam Ariadne	Light Brigade	Picton	Orvieto
Dam Ariadne	Light Brigade	Picton	Hecuba
Dam Ariadne	Light Brigade	Bridge of Sighs	Isinglass
Dam Ariadne	Light Brigade	Bridge of Sighs	Santa Brigida
Dam Ariadne	Adrienne	His Majesty	Ogden
Dam Ariadne	Adrienne	His Majesty	Her Majesty
Dam Ariadne	Adrienne	Adriana	Hamburg
Dam Ariadne	Adrienne	Adriana	Kildeer (family: 23-b)

== See also ==
- Repeat winners of horse races
