= Peace Chance =

American-bred Thoroughbred racehorse

- Sire: Chance Shot
- Grandsire: Fair Play
- Dam: Peace
- Damsire: Stefan The Great
- Sex: Stallion
- Foaled: 1931
- Country: United States
- Colour: Bay
- Breeder: Elmendorf Farm
- Owner: Joseph E. Widener
- Trainer: Pete Coyne
- Record: 13: 5-5-0
- Earnings: $46,660

Major wins
- Derby Trial Stakes (1934) American Classic Race wins: Belmont Stakes (1934)

Peace Chance (1931 – 1951) was an American Thoroughbred racehorse who won the 1934 Belmont Stakes, the third leg of the U.S. Triple Crown series.

Peace Chance was bred and raced by Joseph E. Widener and trained by Pete Coyne, who had won the 1927 Belmont Stakes with his sire, Chance Shot. At age two, the colt's best result was a second in the Remsen Stakes. At age three, he was ridden by 17-year-old jockey Wayne Wright to a new record for the mile in the 1934 Derby Trial Stakes. Wright was aboard the colt in the Kentucky Derby, but Peace Chance was kicked by another horse at the start and finished far back in fifth place.

Peace Chance did not run in the Preakness Stakes, but defeated Preakness winner High Quest by six lengths in the Belmont Stakes. Following his win in the Belmont, he was being prepared for the Arlington Classic when he suffered a career-ending injury.

Retired to stud, Peace Chance produced progeny that had limited success in racing, but he did sire Arbitrator, dam of the very important broodmare Almahmoud. He also sired Arbitrator, great-granddam of the very important Champion sire Halo. Peace Chance died of a heart attack in June 1951 in Hyde, Maryland.
