= Display (horse) =

American-bred Thoroughbred racehorse

- Sire: Fair Play
- Grandsire: Hastings
- Dam: Cicuta
- Damsire: Nassovian
- Sex: Stallion
- Foaled: 1923 Mereworth Farm Lexington, Kentucky
- Country: United States
- Colour: Bay
- Breeder: Walter J. Salmon Sr.
- Owner: Walter J. Salmon Sr.
- Trainer: Thomas J. Healey; William H. Bringloe
- Record: 103: 23-25-19
- Earnings: $256,326

Major wins
- Latonia Championship Stakes (1926); Jockey Club Cup Handicap (1927); Champlain Handicap (1927); Baltimore Handicap (1927); Pimlico Cup Handicap (1927); Toronto Cup Handicap (1927); Washington Handicap (1927); Autumn Stakes (1928); Hawthorne Gold Cup Handicap (1928) Triple Crown wins: Preakness Stakes (1926)

Honours
- Display Stakes at Woodbine Racetrack

Display (1923–1944) was an American Thoroughbred racehorse.

== Background ==
He was owned and bred by Walter J. Salmon Sr., at his Mereworth Farm near Lexington, Kentucky. Display was sired by U.S. Racing Hall of Fame inductee Fair Play, a descendant of West Australian, the first winner of the English Triple Crown. He was out of the mare Cicuta.

Trained by Thomas J. Healey, Display was an extremely difficult horse to handle and in virtually every race caused considerable problems at the starting gate. Nonetheless, he was successful on the racetrack and was always a sound horse that made more than 100 starts in five years of racing.

== Racing career ==
As a two-year-old, Display was entered in two major races for his age group, but neither was a winning effort. He was a runner-up to the J. K. L. Ross colt Penstick in the 1925 Grey Stakes at Old Woodbine Race Course in Toronto, Ontario, and had a third-place effort in the Pimlico Futurity at Pimlico Race Course in Baltimore, Maryland, behind winner Canter and runner-up Bubbling Over. The following spring, he met those two horses again in the 1926 Kentucky Derby. In the 13-horse field, Bubbling Over won the Derby with Canter eighth and Display, ridden by John Maiben, far back in 10th place. However, Display came back to win the Preakness Stakes. He went on that year to win the Latonia Championship Stakes and to earn a second-place finish in the American Derby and a third in the Travers Stakes, as well as the Washington Handicap.

Sent back to racing at age four, Display had his most successful season in 1927. He won the Jockey Club Cup Handicap, Toronto Cup Handicap, Baltimore Handicap, and the Champlain and Washington Handicaps. In addition, he earned seconds in the Jockey Club Gold Cup and the Toronto Autumn Cup, plus a third in the Bowie and Brooklyn Handicaps.

In 1928, Display won the Toronto Autumn Cup, and in Chicago, the Hawthorne Gold Cup Handicap. Attempting to win his second straight Washington Handicap at Laurel Park Racecourse, Display ran second to Mike Hall, who went on to earn 1928 American Champion Older Male Horse honors.

Racing at age six in 1929, Display was third three times in important races: the King Edward Gold Cup, the Washington Handicap, and the Whitney Handicap.

== Stud record ==
Retired to stud duty at his owner's Mereworth Farm, Display was a successful sire who passed along his durability to many of his offspring. Of his progeny, the most successful was Discovery, the 1935 American Horse of the Year and a U.S. Racing Hall of Fame inductee. Display died in 1944 at Mereworth Farm and is buried there. His last three foals were born that year.

== Sire line tree ==
- Display
  - Discovery
    - Loser Weeper
    - Find

== Pedigree ==
Pedigree of Display
Sire Fair Play ch. 1905	Hastings brown 1893	Spendthrift	Australian
Sire Fair Play ch. 1905	Hastings brown 1893	Spendthrift	Aerolite
Sire Fair Play ch. 1905	Hastings brown 1893	Cinderella	Tomahawk
Sire Fair Play ch. 1905	Hastings brown 1893	Cinderella	Manna
Sire Fair Play ch. 1905	Fairy Gold ch. 1896	Bend Or	Doncaster
Sire Fair Play ch. 1905	Fairy Gold ch. 1896	Bend Or	Rouge Rose
Sire Fair Play ch. 1905	Fairy Gold ch. 1896	Dame Masham	Galliard
Sire Fair Play ch. 1905	Fairy Gold ch. 1896	Dame Masham	Pauline
Dam Cicuta bay 1919	Nassovian bay 1913	William the Third	St. Simon
Dam Cicuta bay 1919	Nassovian bay 1913	William the Third	Gravity
Dam Cicuta bay 1919	Nassovian bay 1913	Veneration	Laveno
Dam Cicuta bay 1919	Nassovian bay 1913	Veneration	Admiration
Dam Cicuta bay 1919	Hemlock bay 1913	Spearmint	Carbine
Dam Cicuta bay 1919	Hemlock bay 1913	Spearmint	Maid of the Mist
Dam Cicuta bay 1919	Hemlock bay 1913	Keystone	Persimmon
Dam Cicuta bay 1919	Hemlock bay 1913	Keystone	Lock and Key (Family 2-u)
