= Chance Shot =

American-bred Thoroughbred racehorse

- Sire: Fair Play
- Grandsire: Hastings
- Dam: Quelle Chance
- Damsire: Ethelbert
- Sex: Stallion
- Foaled: 1924
- Country: United States
- Colour: Bay
- Breeder: August Belmont, Jr.
- Owner: Joseph E. Widener
- Trainer: Pete Coyne
- Record: 22:8-7-0
- Earnings: $142,277

Major wins
- National Stallion Stakes (1926); Saratoga Special Stakes (1926); Withers Stakes (1927); Saratoga Handicap (1928); Merchants and Citizens Handicap (1928) American Classic Race wins: Belmont Stakes (1927)
- Last updated on 2019-07-07

Chance Shot (1924–1952) was an American-bred thoroughbred racehorse and sire. Bred by August Belmont, Jr. at his nursery stud in Lexington, Kentucky, he was sired by the great Fair Play, which made him a half brother to Man o' War, out of the mare Quelle Chance who was bred at Belmont's Haras de Villers stud farm in Normandy, France. He was a full brother to stakes winner and 2-time leading sire Chance Play.

Trained by Pete Coyne and ridden by Earl Sande, Chance Shot was a stakes winner at 2, 3, and 4. As a two-year-old in 1926 he won the Saratoga Special Stakes and the National Stallion Stakes. At age three Chance Shot followed up an impressive win in the 1927 Withers Stakes with a victory in the Belmont Stakes.

== Retirement ==
Upon retirement, Chance Shot was sent to stud at Elmendorf Farm in 1930 to replace his sire, Fair Play, who had died in 1929. He was very successful as a stud, siring the 1934 Belmont Stakes winner, Peace Chance, as well as the champion filly Fairy Chant, Bushwacker, Shot Put, Chance Sun, and Your Chance.

Upon his death in 1952, Chance Shot was buried at Normandy Farm, a portion of Elmendorf Farm that had been renamed.

== Sire line tree ==
- Chance Shot
  - Peace Chance
    - Four Freedoms
  - Chance Sun
  - Shot Put
  - Your Chance
  - Bushwhacker
