= Fair Play (horse) =

American-bred Thoroughbred racehorse

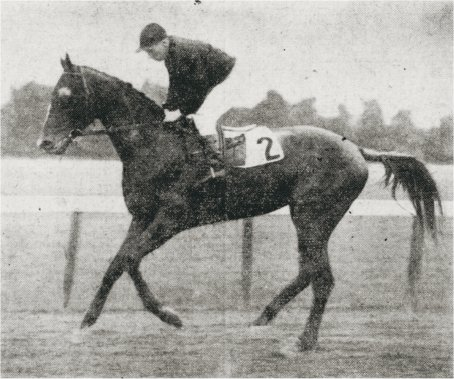
- Fair Play in 1908
- Sire: Hastings
- Grandsire: Spendthrift
- Dam: Fairy Gold
- Damsire: Bend Or
- Sex: Stallion
- Foaled: April 1, 1905
- Died: December 17, 1929 (aged 24); Elmendorf Farm; Lexington, Kentucky
- Country: United States
- Colour: Chestnut
- Breeder: August Belmont Jr.
- Owner: August Belmont Jr.
- Trainer: A. Jack Joyner
- Record: 32: 10-11-3
- Earnings: $86,950

Major wins
- Flash Stakes (1907); Montauk Stakes (1907); Brooklyn Derby (1908); Coney Island Jockey Club Stakes (1908); First Special Stakes (1908); Lawrence Realization Stakes (1908); Jerome Handicap (1908); Municipal Handicap (1908)

Awards
- Leading sire in North America (1920, 1924, 1927); Leading broodmare sire in North America (1931, 1934, 1938)

Honours
- United States Racing Hall of Fame (1956); Life-size statue at Elmendorf Farm

Fair Play (April 1, 1905 – December 17, 1929) was an American-bred Thoroughbred racehorse who was successful on the track, but even more so when retired to stud. He is best known as the sire of Man o' War, widely considered one of the greatest American racehorses of all time. On the racetrack, Fair Play was known for his rivalry with the undefeated Colin, to whom he finished second in the Belmont Stakes. Later, Fair Play was the leading sire in North America of 1920, 1924 and 1927, and the leading broodmare sire of 1931, 1934 and 1938. He was inducted into the National Museum of Racing and Hall of Fame in 1956.

== Background ==
Fair Play raced as a homebred for August Belmont Jr., who was chairman of The Jockey Club from 1895 until his death in 1924. Belmont became involved in horse racing through his father, in whose honor the Belmont Stakes was named. Belmont purchased a two-year-old colt named Hastings in 1895, who went on to win the Belmont Stakes the following year. Hastings was the leading sire of 1902 and 1908. He was primarily known as a sire of fast, precocious horses but was known to pass on his savage temperament to his offspring in varying degrees.

Fair Play's dam, Fairy Gold, was a stakes winning daughter of Epsom Derby winner Bend Or. In addition to Fair Play, Fairy Gold produced six other stakes winners including Friar Rock, who won the 1916 Belmont Stakes. Her daughters St. Lucre and Golden View also became outstanding producers and the family is still active with descendants such as Dubawi, Dalakhani and Daylami.

Fair Play's grandsire was Spendthrift, whose grandsire was the English Triple Crown champion West Australian. This sire line traces to the Godolphin Arabian.

Fair Play was an attractive golden chestnut horse who stood 15.3 hands (63 inches, 160 cm) at maturity. He was always highly strung, and his behavior completely soured when he was sent to race in England in 1909. Subsequently, he would not allow a rider to exercise him over grass. He was trained by Andrew Jackson Joyner.

== Racing career ==
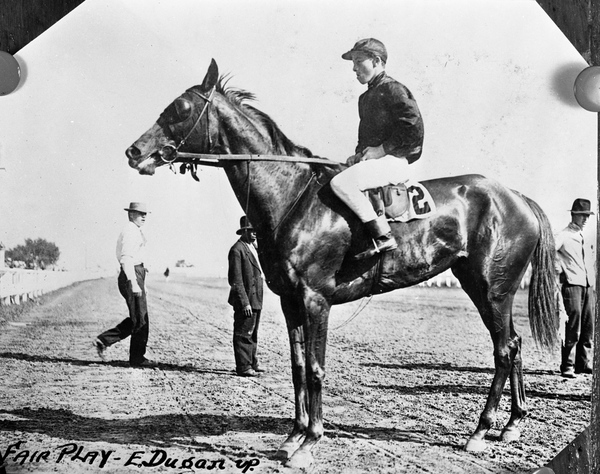
Fair Play and Eddie Dugan at Empire City Racetrack, 1907

As a two-year-old, Fair Play finished fourth in his first start and broke his maiden in his second. He then won the Montauk Stakes at Brighton Beach Race Course and the Flash Stakes at Saratoga. He was also second in the Hopeful, Produce, and Matron Stakes, and he finished third in the United States Hotel and Nursery Handicap. He was unplaced in the Futurity Stakes.

Fair Play was considered among the best horses of his generation, though clearly a step behind the great Colin. The competition between these two was covered in Horse Racing's Greatest Rivalries, published by the Eclipse Press in 2008. Colin beat Fair Play three times at age two (in the Futurity, Produce, and Matron Stakes), then beat him again in the Withers Stakes to start his three-year-old campaign. In their final face off in the Belmont Stakes, Colin went out to an early lead but was nearly caught at the wire by Fair Play, who lost by a neck in a blinding rainstorm. They never met again, and Colin retired after one more start.

With two days of rest, Fair Play next entered the Brooklyn Handicap, where he finished second to Colin's stablemate, Celt. He finally won his first start at age three in the Brooklyn Derby before finishing third in the Suburban Handicap.

After a slow start to the season, Fair Play won six of his next nine starts at distances ranging from 10 to 14 furlongs. These included the Coney Island Jockey Club Stakes, where he equaled the track record, the Lawrence Realization, the Jerome Handicap (set track record), the First Special (set new track record of 2:03 2/5 for 10 furlongs), and the Municipal Handicap.

In 1909, racing in New York was shut down due to the Hart–Agnew Executive Liability Act, an anti-gambling bill. Therefore, Joyner relocated to England and took several horses with him, including Fair Play. Although Joyner had a good deal of success overseas, Fair Play did not respond well to the experiment, going unplaced in six starts. Although Belmont contemplated standing Fair Play at stud in France, he was instead returned to America.

== Stud career ==
While successful on the track, Fair Play gained his most fame as a sire. Among his better progeny were:

- Man o' War – chosen #1 in the Blood-Horse magazine List of the Top 100 U.S. Racehorses of the 20th Century
- Mad Hatter – 1921 U.S. Champion Older Male Horse
- Chance Play – 1927 United States Horse of the Year
- Display – 1926 Preakness Stakes winner and sire of champion Discovery
- Chance Shot – 1927 Belmont Stakes winner; sire of Belmont Stakes winner Peace Chance
- Mad Play – 1924 Belmont Stakes winner
- My Play – 1924 Jockey Club Gold Cup winner
- Ladkin – 1924 International Stakes No.2 winner
- Fairmount – U.S. Hall of Fame steeplechase champion

Following the death of owner August Belmont Jr., in 1924, Fair Play was sold to Joseph E. Widener, proprietor of Elmendorf Farm in Lexington, Kentucky, where he remained until his death on December 17, 1929. Widener, a dedicated horseman, buried Fair Play in the Elmendorf Farm cemetery and erected a nearly life-size bronze statue at the head of his grave.

Fair Play is in the ancestral lineage of practically all modern American thoroughbreds. Man o' War and Discovery were both outstanding sires and the Man o' War sire line is still active today. Discovery was the broodmare sire of Bold Ruler, whose descendants include Secretariat, Seattle Slew, A.P. Indy and multiple classic winners.

== Sire line tree ==
- Fair Play
  - Stromboli
  - Earlocker
  - Mad Hatter
    - The Nut
    - Cocked Hat
    - Cresta Run
  - Man o' War
    - Annapolis
      - Mercator
    - American Flag
      - Gusto
    - Gun Boat
    - Crusader
      - Crossbow II
      - Royal Crusader
    - Mars
    - Scapa Flow
    - Clyde Van Dusen
    - Hard Tack
      - Seabiscuit
        - Sea Sovereign
        - Sea Swallow
    - Battleship
      - Floating Isle
      - Navigate
      - War Battle
      - Tide Rips
      - Navy Gun
      - Sea Legs
      - Eolus
      - Cap-A-Pie
      - Mighty Mo
      - Shipboard
    - Fleet Flag
    - Blockade
    - Ship Executive
    - Tsukitomo
    - War Admiral
      - Blue Peter
      - Mr Busher
      - Cold Command
      - Navy Page
      - Admiral Vee
    - Great War
    - Sky Raider
    - War Relic
      - Relic
        - Buisson Ardent
        - El Relicario
        - Polic
        - Mystic II
        - Olden Times
        - Pericles
        - Pieces of Eight
      - Battlefield
      - Intent
        - Intentionally
      - Missile
  - Chatterton
    - Faireno
  - My Play
    - Head Play
      - El Mono
  - Dunlin
    - Snap Back
  - Fairmount
  - Ladkin
    - Ladder
      - Bunty Lawless
        - Windfields
        - Epic
        - McGill
  - Mad Play
  - Chance Play
    - Psychic Bid
    - Grand Slam
      - Piet
    - Some Chance
    - Pot O'Luck
      - Pot Hunter
  - Display
    - Discovery
      - Loser Weeper
      - Find
  - Chance Shot
    - Peace Chance
      - Four Freedoms
    - Chance Sun
    - Shot Put
    - Your Chance
    - Bushwhacker
  - Best Play

== Pedigree ==
Pedigree of Fair Play, 1905
Sire Hastings	Spendthrift	*Australian	West Australian (GB)
Sire Hastings	Spendthrift	*Australian	Emilia (GB)
Sire Hastings	Spendthrift	Aerolite	Lexington
Sire Hastings	Spendthrift	Aerolite	Florine
Sire Hastings	*Cinderella	Tomahawk (GB)	King Tom (GB)
Sire Hastings	*Cinderella	Tomahawk (GB)	Mincemeat (GB)
Sire Hastings	*Cinderella	Manna	Brown Bread (GB)
Sire Hastings	*Cinderella	Manna	Tartlet (GB)
Dam *Fairy Gold	Bend Or (GB)	Doncaster (GB)	Stockwell (GB)
Dam *Fairy Gold	Bend Or (GB)	Doncaster (GB)	Marigold (GB)
Dam *Fairy Gold	Bend Or (GB)	Rouge Rose (GB)	Thormanby (GB)
Dam *Fairy Gold	Bend Or (GB)	Rouge Rose (GB)	Ellen Horne (GB)
Dam *Fairy Gold	Dame Masham (GB)	Galliard (GB)	Galopin (GB)
Dam *Fairy Gold	Dame Masham (GB)	Galliard (GB)	Mavis (GB)
Dam *Fairy Gold	Dame Masham (GB)	Pauline (GB)	Hermit (GB)
Dam *Fairy Gold	Dame Masham (GB)	Pauline (GB)	Lady Masham (GB) (family 9-e)

An asterisk before the name means the horse was imported into America.

== See also ==
- List of racehorses
