= List of people from Mansfield, Ohio =

The following is a list of people from Mansfield, Ohio. These people were born, lived, or worked in and around the city.

== Architecture ==
- Paul Gilger, architect, set designer and playwright
- Friedrich Ferdinand Schnitzer, architect with many structures on the National Register of Historic Places; principal architect and superintendent of construction for Ohio State Reformatory in Mansfield

== Astronauts ==
- Michael L. Gernhardt, astronaut

== Athletics ==
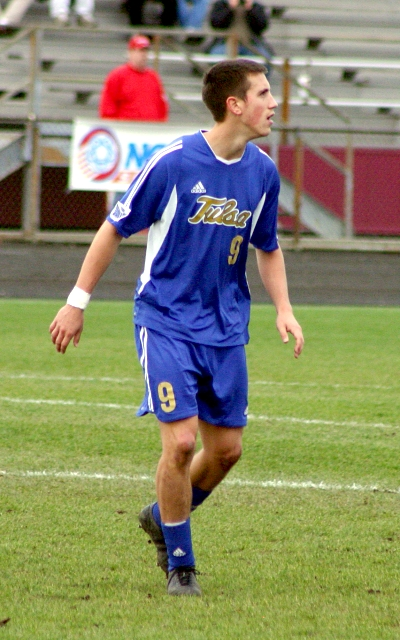
Ryan Pore

- Ernie Beam, former pitcher in the National League for the Philadelphia Phillies in 1895
- AJ Blubaugh, pitcher in Major League Baseball (MLB} for the Houston Astros (2025–present)
- Hugh Douglas, Philadelphia Eagles defensive end
- Jamie Feick, former NBA player
- Pete Henry, professional football player
- Natalie Hershberger, six-time National Olympic-style Taekwondo champion
- Mary Holda, All-American Girls Professional Baseball League player
- Taylor Huff, professional soccer player, Bay FC
- Dick Logan, professional football player
- Terry McDaniel, professional football player for the Oakland Raiders and the Seattle Seahawks
- Ricky Minard, professional basketball player
- Don Nehlen, former head football coach
- Bill Peterson, former head football coach: Florida State, Mansfield Senior High, Rice University, and Houston Oilers
- Ryan Pore, professional soccer player, Major League Soccer, Kansas City Wizards
- Marc Wilkins, former MLB pitcher for the Pittsburgh Pirates (1996—2001)

== Authors and writers ==
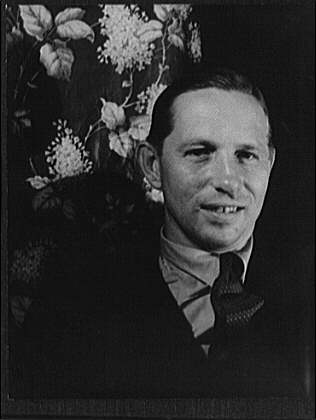
Louis Bromfield

- Jacob Brinkerhoff, jurist, congressman, and author
- Roeliff Brinkerhoff, lawyer; editor and owner of the Mansfield Herald; later a bank president
- Louis Bromfield, Pulitzer Prize-winning author
- Stacy Dittrich, true crime author and mystery novelist
- Natalie Hershberger, author
- Terry Hertzler, poet and writer
- Mary Bigelow Ingham, educator, writer, social reformer
- Christopher Moore, author

== Entertainment ==
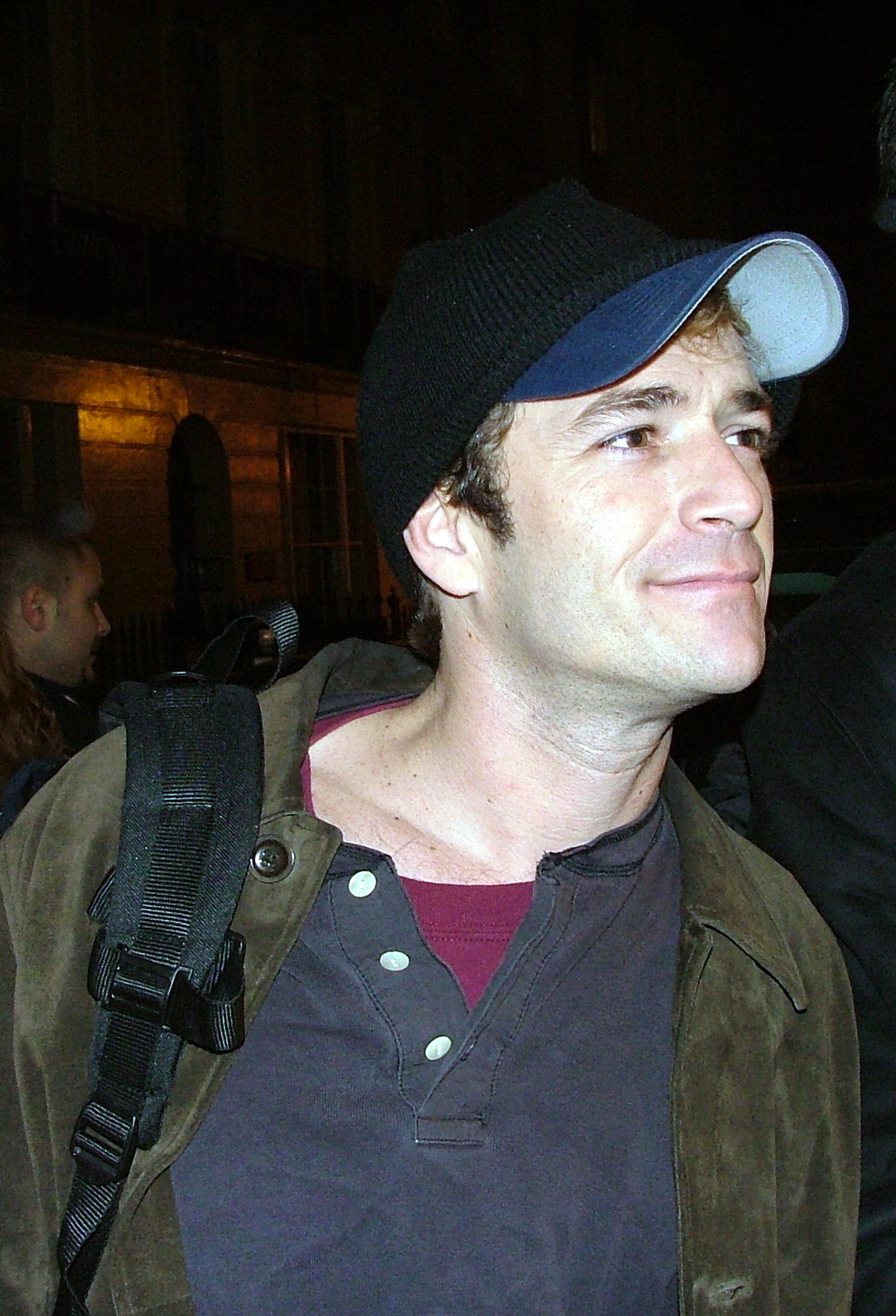
Luke Perry

- Lee Adams, stage lyricist
- Jenni Barber, actress, The Electric Company
- John Bishop, playwright and film writer
- James Lapine, playwright and director
- Michael McConnohie, voice actor
- Sylvia McNair, operatic soprano
- Luke Perry, actor (television), Beverly Hills, 90210
- Daniel Roemer, film director, screenwriter
- Robert F. Simon, actor

== Entrepreneurs ==
- Homer Lee, engraver, artist, entrepreneur, founder of Homer Lee Bank Note Company

== Military ==
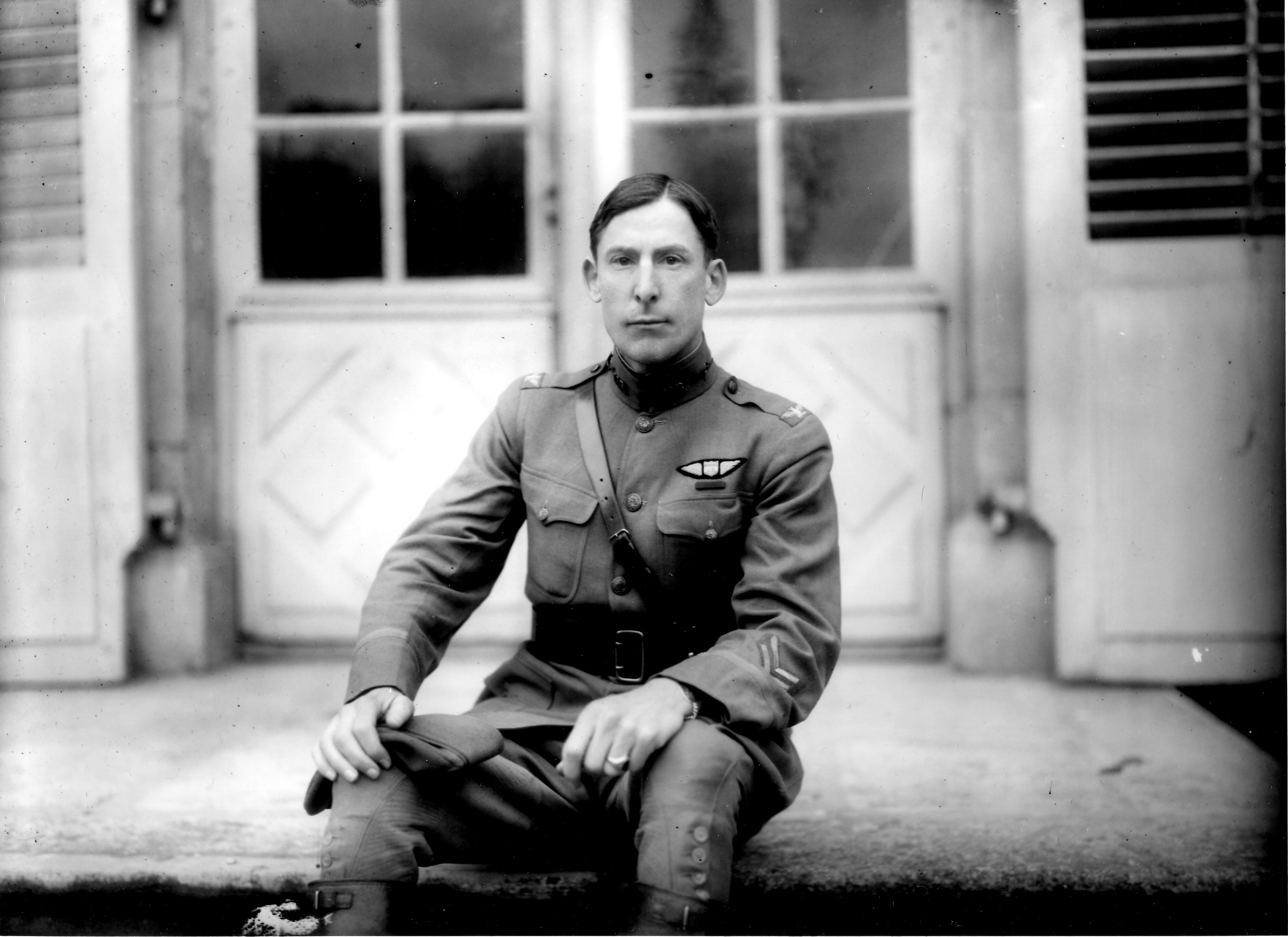
Frank Purdy Lahm

- Matthias W. Day, US Army Medal of Honor recipient
- Frank Purdy Lahm, first Army aviator
- Mark Matthews, veteran

== Musicians and bands ==
- Music Explosion, rock group; James "Jamie" Lyons (singer, percussion), Donald Atkins (guitar), Richard Nesta (guitar), Burton Stahl (bass), Robert Avery (drums); top ten hit in 1967, "Little Bit O'Soul"
- Ohio Express, rock group; Doug Grassel (rhythm guitar), Dale Powers (lead guitar), Dean Kastran (bass), Jim Pfahler (keyboards), and Tim Corwin (drums)
- Switch, Motown R&B/soul group

== Politicians ==
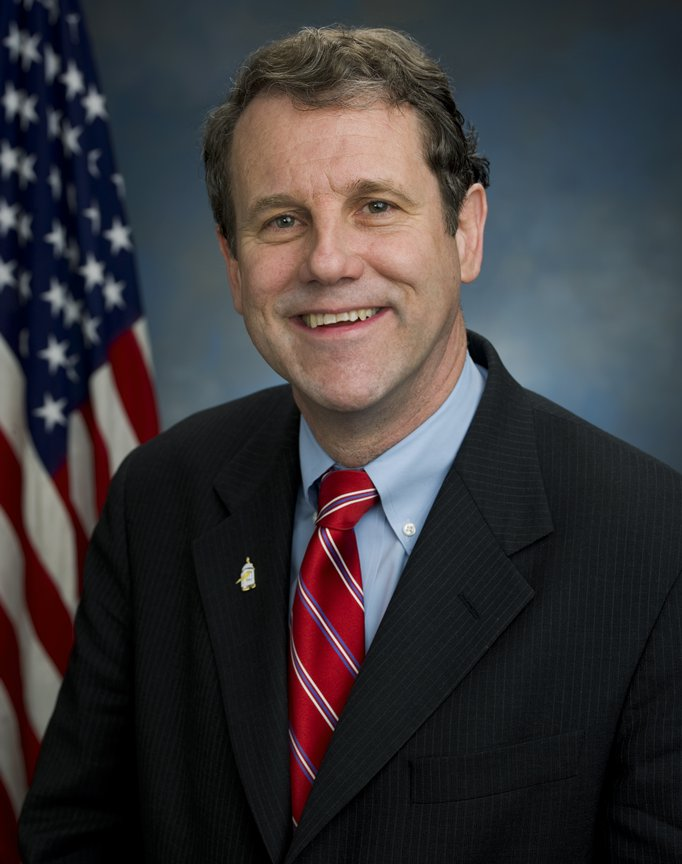
Sherrod Brown

- Charlie Brown, West Virginia attorney general
- Sherrod Brown, U.S. senator for Ohio
- Jay Goyal, member of the Ohio House of Representatives
- William Johnston, U.S. representative for Ohio
- Lovana Jones, member of the Illinois House of Representatives
- Winfield S. Kerr, U.S. representative for Ohio
- B. F. Langworthy, member of the Minnesota House of Representatives
- Robert Byington Mitchell, governor of the New Mexico Territory 1866–1869
- William Patterson, U.S. representative for Ohio
- James A. Reed, U.S. Senator for Missouri
- Mark Romanchuk, member of the Ohio Senate

== Scientists ==
- Paul Parmalee, zooarchaeologist

== Other ==
- Rebecca Gernhardt Cox (born c. 1955), assistant secretary of transportation; public liaison director for President Reagan; senior vice president, Continental Airlines
- Shawn Grate, serial killer
- Rose Knox, née Markward (1857–1950), businesswoman (Knox Gelatin Factory)
- Roy Repp (1882–1934), stunt driver
