= Repp =

Repp is a surname. Notable people with the name include:

- Corrina Repp, American vocalist, guitarist, and songwriter from Portland, Oregon
- Ed Earl Repp (1901–1979), American writer, screenwriter and novelist
- Pierre Repp (1909–1986), French humorist and actor
- Ray Repp (1942–2020), American Roman Catholic singer-songwriter
- Roy Repp (1882–1934), Australian stunt driver
- Stafford Repp (1918–1974), American character actor
- Þorleifur Repp (1794–1857), Icelandic scholar and philologist
