= Samuel D. Riddle =

American businessman and racehorse owner (1861–1951)

- Born: July 1, 1861; Glen Riddle, Pennsylvania, U.S.
- Died: January 8, 1951 (aged 89); Glen Riddle, Pennsylvania, U.S.
- Occupations: Businessman: Textile manufacturing Racehorse owner/breeder
- Known for: Man o' War, War Admiral

Samuel Doyle Riddle (July 1, 1861 – January 8, 1951) was an American businessman and racehorse owner. He was born in Glen Riddle, Pennsylvania, a small town in Delaware County southwest of Philadelphia, given the family name by his father Samuel Riddle. Samuel D. Riddle owned and operated a woolen mill started by his father, but is best known as a sportsman.

His father Samuel Riddle was born in Ireland and arrived in America in 1825. His mother was Lydia Doyle.

Samuel D. Riddle had a brother, Leander W. Riddle. His sisters were Lydia Maud Riddle (who married Donald C. Haldeman, general manager for Great Britain and Ireland of the Mutual Life Insurance Company of New York) and Charlotte Buffington Riddle, member number 25516 of the Daughters of the American Revolution (who married Homer Lee of Mansfield, Ohio, founder of the Homer Lee Bank Note Company in New York City). Homer and Charlotte Lee's children were Leander Lee and Homer Lee, Jr.

Riddle married Elizabeth "Lizzie" Dobson in 1883. She was the daughter of John Dobson, who with his brother owned a mill in East Falls, Philadelphia. The couple had no children, but raised Elizabeth's niece, Sarah Dobson Fiske, the daughter of Elizabeth's sister, also named Sarah Dobson Fiske.

== Thoroughbred racing ==
The owner of Glen Riddle Farm, Riddle bred and raced Thoroughbred race horses. His most famous horses were Man o' War and his son, U.S. Triple Crown winner War Admiral.

In partnership with Walter M. Jeffords, Sr., the husband of niece Sarah, Samuel D. Riddle purchased and operated Faraway Farm on Huffman Mill Pike near Lexington, Kentucky, where they stood Man o' War. In 1939, Riddle turned down an offer of a then-unheard-of $1 million for Man o' War.

Upon his death in January 1951, Riddle's will stipulated that his estate was to be used to provide a hospital for the community of Media, Pennsylvania, the nearest town to Glen Riddle. With the $2.5 million and the 72 acres (290,000 m^{2}) of land provided by Riddle, fronted by Baltimore Pike, a charter for the hospital was granted on November 29, 1956. Riddle Memorial Hospital opened in February 1963, on 34 acres (140,000 m^{2}) of the land, with the balance of the land reserved for some manner related to the health and well-being of the community.

The Riddlewood residential housing development in Middletown Township, Delaware County, Pennsylvania, is named for Riddle and its streets are named for the horses he owned.
