= Cranesville Historic District =

Historic district in Massachusetts, United States

- U.S. National Register of Historic Places
- U.S. Historic district
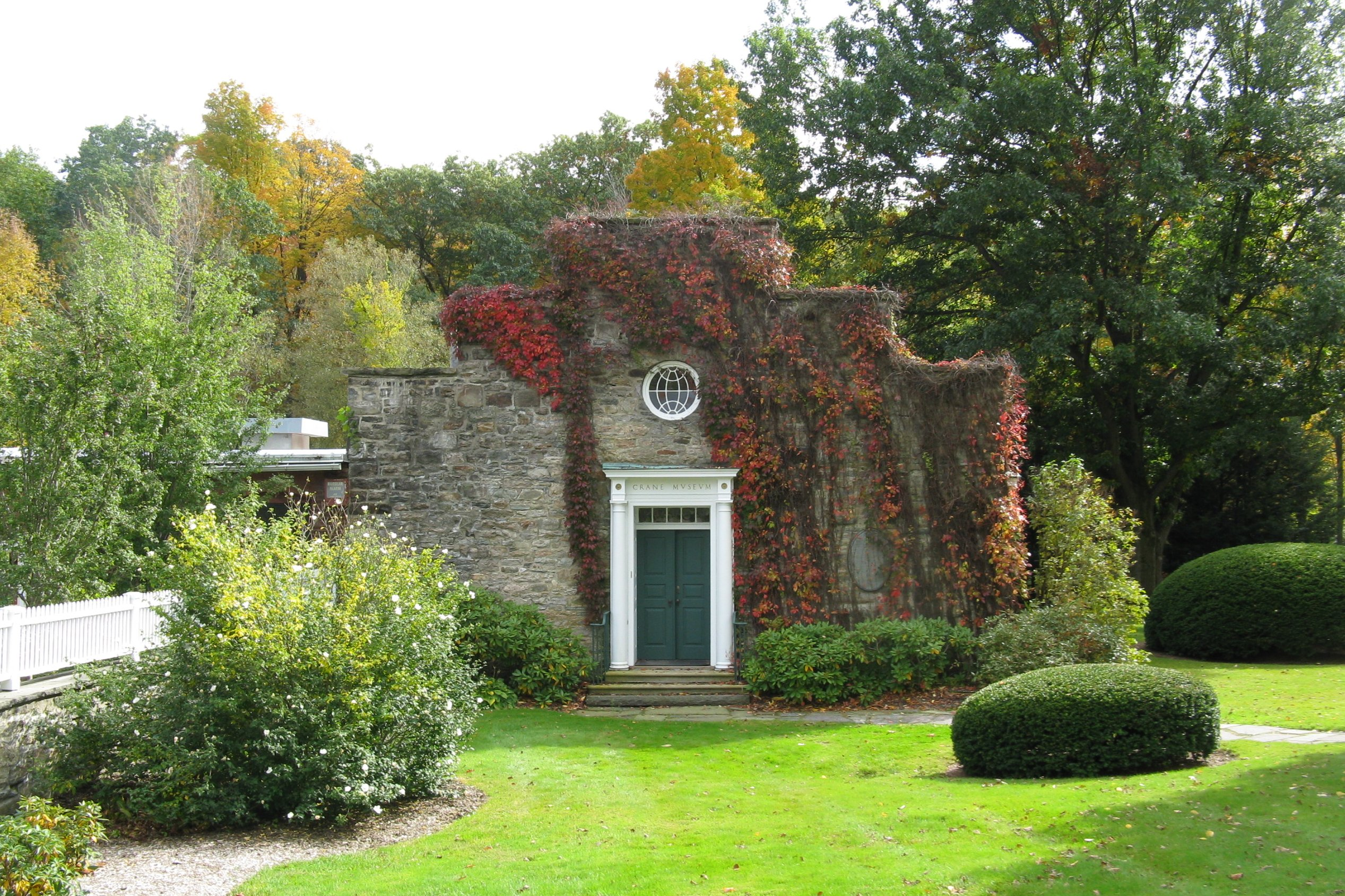
- Crane Museum

- Location within Massachusetts Location within the United States
- Location: North and south of Main St., west of Park Ave., Dalton, Massachusetts
- Coordinates: 42°28′21″N 73°10′38″W
- Area: 154 acres (62 ha)
- Built: 1816
- Architect: Bradley, Prentice; et al.
- Architectural style: Early Republic, Mid 19th Century Revival
- NRHP reference No.: 05001208
- Added to NRHP: November 9, 2005

The Cranesville Historic District is a historic district in Dalton, Massachusetts, centered on the business and residential properties associated with the papermaker Crane and Company. The district, centered on Main Street west of the town civic center, was added to the National Register of Historic Places in 2005.

== Description and history ==
Papermaking began as an industry in Dalton in the early 19th century, and was dominated by Zenas Crane's operations by the early 1820s. Crane and Company controlled numerous papermaking operations throughout the Berkshires, but it was headquartered in Dalton, where the Crane family lived. The family built several large estates on the north side of Main Street, notably Sugar Hill, the home of Winthrop Murray Crane, who oversaw the company's success in the late 19th century, and served as Governor of Massachusetts. The company's historic industrial facilities of Crane are located south of Main Street, although they are generally near the Housatonic River and screened from view. Prominent on the street in this area is the 1816 home of Zenas Crane, who founded the business in Dalton in the early 19th century. The most notable of the industrial facilities is the National Historic Landmark Crane and Company Old Stone Mill Rag Room, the oldest surviving building on the Crane premises.

Extending east along Main Street from the industrial complex are a number of late 19th century houses, most of which were built by or for executives of the Crane company. Southwest along South Street, extending along Crane and Porter Avenues on the south side of the river, are groups of company-built worker housing. These are primarily identical duplexes built in the 1910s and 1920s. Another cluster of worker housing lies north east of the Crane family estates off Park Avenue; this area also includes a series of modest Capes built by the Cranes for World War II veterans in the early 1950s.

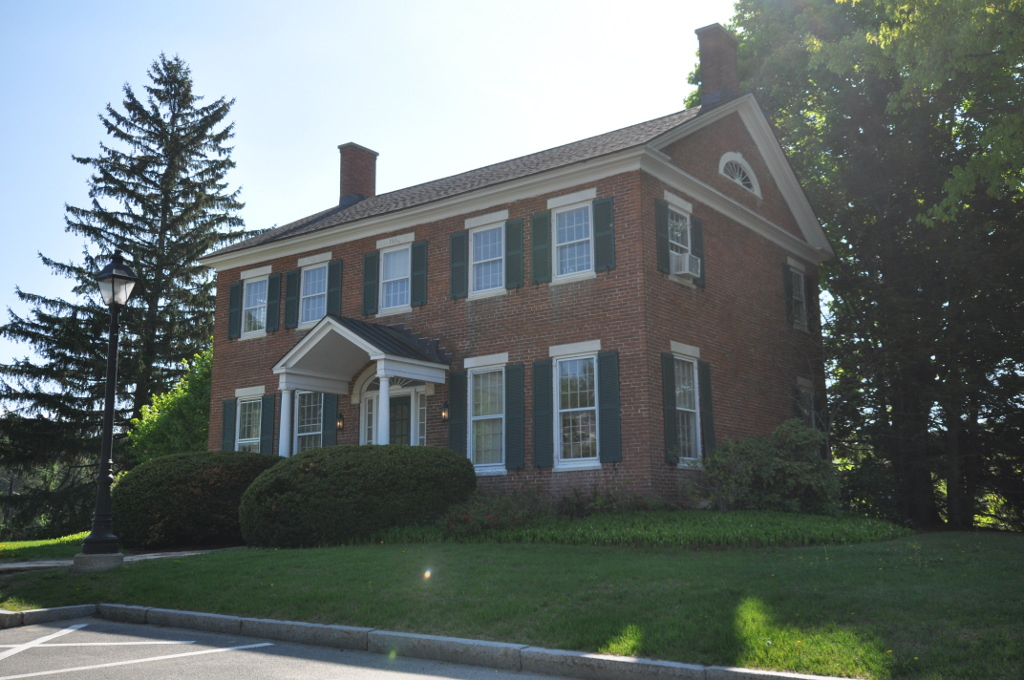
The Zenas Crane House (now housing Crane Company offices)

== See also ==
- National Register of Historic Places listings in Berkshire County, Massachusetts
