= Hertzler =

Hertzler is a surname. Notable people with the surname include:

- J. G. Hertzler (born 1950), American actor
- Terry Hertzler (born 1949), American poet and writer

== See also ==
- Hartzler
