= New York Bank Note Company =

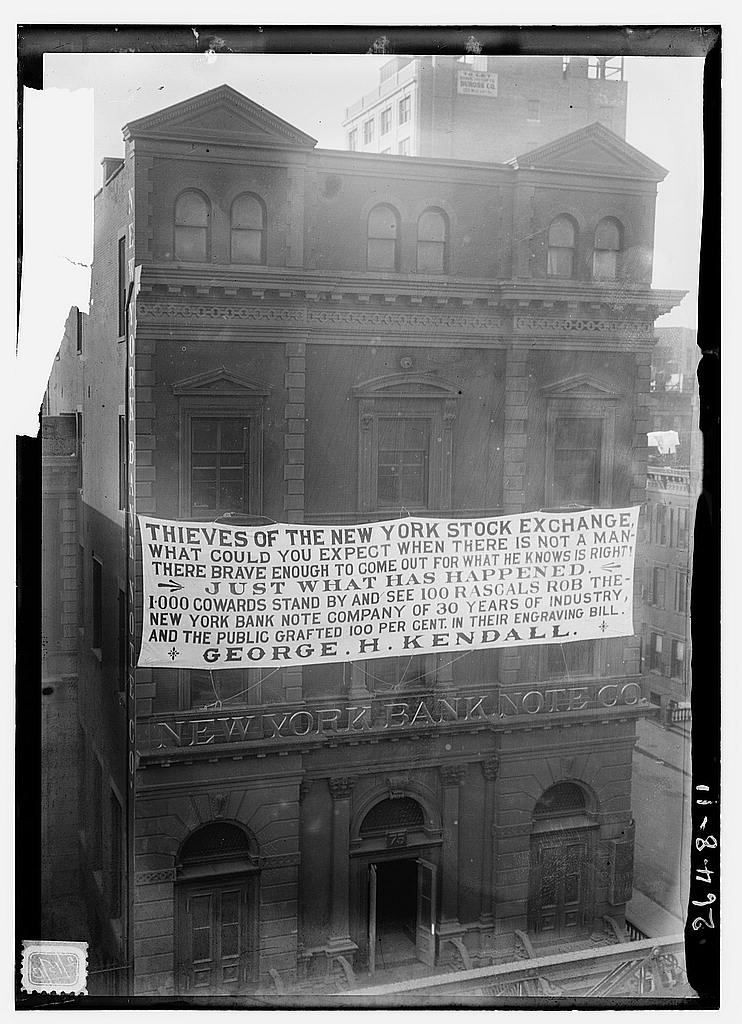
New York Bank Note Company building in 1913

The New York Bank Note Company was an engraver of stock certificates in New York City.

== History ==
The company was founded in 1877 as the Kendall Bank Note Company. In 1892 George H. Kendall replaced Russell Sage as president of the company.

== See also ==
- American Bank Note Company
- Homer Lee Bank Note Company
