= Hartzler =

Hartzler is a surname. Notable people with the surname include:

- Amy Hartzler (born 1981), better known as Amy Lee, American singer-songwriter and musician
- Vicky Hartzler (born 1960), American politician

== See also ==
- Hertzler
