= Terry Hertzler =

American poet and writer (born 1949)

Terry Hertzler (born in Mansfield, Ohio, in 1949) is an American poet and writer.

Hertzler is the owner of Caernarvon Press, a small literary press based in San Diego, California, that publishes both well-known and emerging writers. Hertzler's own work includes several chapbooks of poetry and fiction as well as The Way of the Snake, a book of poetry based on his experiences as a soldier in the war in Vietnam, and Second Skin (ISBN 0-9716383-2-2), of which Dorianne Laux said, "Second Skin provides ample evidence that poetry can be both accessible and powerful, that writing doesn't have to be obscure or difficult to make us think, to move us. Hertzler paints word pictures whose images stay with the reader long after the book is closed." His work has been nominated three times for The Pushcart Prize and has been widely published in literary journals and anthologies, including The Iowa Review, The Writer, Literal Latte, North American Review, Margie, Nimrod, Stand Up Poetry: An Expanded Anthology (University of Iowa Press) and In the Palm of Your Hand: The Poet’s Portable Workshop (Tilbury House, Publishers). His poetry has also been produced on stage and for radio and television.

Hertzler has twice been one of the winners in The Iowa Review's Jeff Sharlet Memorial Award for Veterans (in 2013 and 2015). Among other awards, Hertzler was the winner of the 2008 Literal Latte Short Short Contest, and a recent poem, "Heirlooms," from the anthology "No, Achilles: War Poetry," was nominated for the 2016 Pushcart Prize.
