= Rasmus Rask =

Danish linguist and philologist

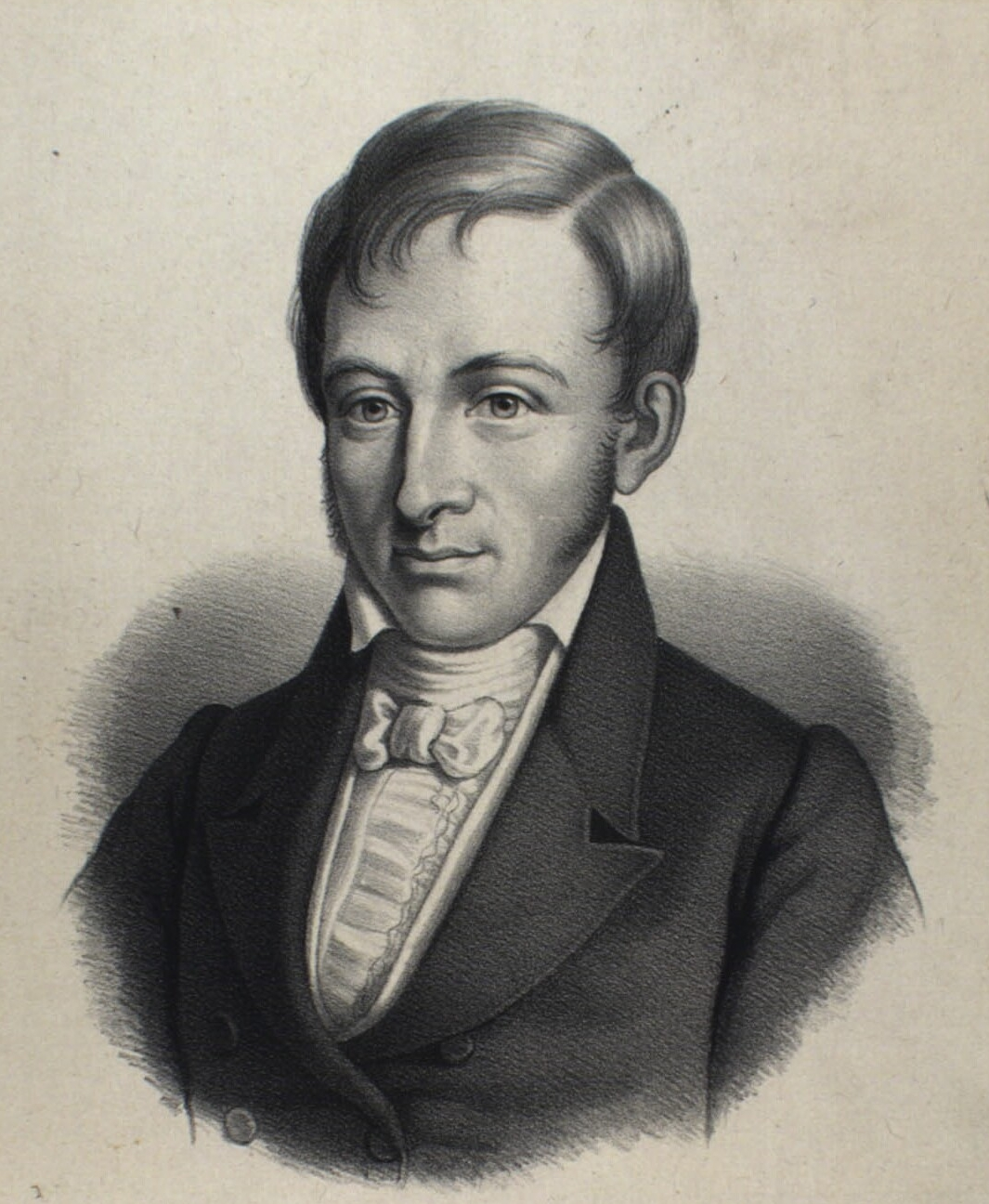
- Born: Rasmus Christian Nielsen Rasch; 22 November 1787; Brændekilde, Denmark
- Died: 14 November 1832 (aged 44); Copenhagen, Denmark

Academic background
- Education: University of Copenhagen

Academic work
- Discipline: Linguistics, Philology
- Sub-discipline: Historical linguistics Comparative linguistics

Rasmus Kristian Rask (Danish: [ˈʁɑsmus ˈkʰʁestjæn ˈʁɑsk]; born Rasmus Christian Nielsen Rasch; 22 November 1787 – 14 November 1832) was a Danish linguist, philologist and a principal founder of the science of comparative linguistics. In 1818, he first showed that, in their consonant sounds, words in the Germanic languages vary with a certain regularity from their equivalents in the other Indo-European languages. What Rask observed proved to be the basis of a fundamental law of comparative linguistics (Grimm's law), which was formally set forth in 1822 by Jacob Grimm.

Rask traveled extensively to study languages, first to Iceland, where he wrote the first grammar of Icelandic, and later to Russia, Persia, India, and Ceylon (now Sri Lanka). Shortly before his death, he was hired as professor of Eastern languages at the University of Copenhagen. Rask is especially known for his contributions to comparative linguistics, including an early formulation of what would later be known as Grimm's Law. He was elected as a member to the American Philosophical Society in 1829.

== Early life ==
Rask was born to Niels Hansen Rasch and Birthe Rasmusdatter in the village of Brændekilde near Odense on the Danish island of Funen. His father, a smallholder and tailor, was well-read and had a decently-sized book collection. As a child, Rask's scholastic abilities became apparent, and, in 1801, at the age of thirteen, he was sent to the Latin school in Odense, now known as the Odense Katedralskole. One of his friends from Latin school, Niels Matthias Petersen (1791–1862), who went on to be the first professor of Nordic languages at the University of Copenhagen, later remarked that "His short stature, his lively eyes, the ease with which he moved and jumped over tables and benches, his unusual knowledge, and even his quaint peasant dress, attracted the attention of his fellow students". At the Latin school, Rask's interest in Old Norse and Icelandic language and literature was awakened. His teacher, Jochum E. Suhr, loaned him a copy of Snorri Sturluson's Heimskringla in Icelandic, and the rector, Ludvig Heiberg, gave him a new translation of the same work as a prize for his diligence. By comparing the original work and the translation, he was able to make an Icelandic vocabulary, cross-referencing the Icelandic words with cognates in Danish, Swedish, German, Dutch and English. In addition to Danish and Latin, Rask studied Greek, Hebrew, French and German at Odense. An interest in orthography also led Rask to develop his own spelling system for Danish that more closely resembled its pronunciation, and it was at this time that he changed the spelling of his last name from "Rasch" to "Rask".

== University years ==
In 1808, Rask traveled to Copenhagen to continue his studies at the University of Copenhagen, where he stayed in the Regensen dormitory. Although he was not particularly religious and even had expressed serious doubts, he signed up as a student of theology, although in practice he simply studied the grammar of various languages of his own choosing. By 1812, he had systematically studied Sami, Swedish, Faroese, English, Dutch, Gothic, Old English and Portuguese, and had started studies of German, French, Spanish, Italian, Greek, Latin, Russian, Polish and Czech, although Icelandic continued to be his main interest.

In 1809, he finished his first book, Introduction to the Icelandic or Old Norse Language, which he published in Danish in 1811. It was a didactic grammar based on printed and manuscript materials accumulated by his predecessors in the same field of research. According to Hans Frede Nielsen, it exceeded anything previously published on the topic.

== Prize essay ==
In 1811, the Royal Danish Academy of Sciences and Letters put out a call for a prize essay on the topic of language history that would "use historical critique and fitting examples to illuminate the source whence the old Scandinavian tongue can be most probably derived, to explain the character of the language and the relations that it has had through the middle ages to the Nordic as well as Germanic dialects, and to accurately ascertain the basic tenets upon which all derivation and comparison of these tongues should be constructed."

In order to conduct research for the prize essay, Rask traveled to Sweden in 1812 with his friend Rasmus Nyerup. There, he studied Sami and Finnish in order to determine whether they were related to the Scandinavian languages. When he returned to Denmark, he was recommended to the Arnamagnæan Institute, which hired him to edit Björn Halldórsson's Icelandic Lexicon (1814), which had long remained in manuscript. From 1813 to 1815, Rask visited Iceland, where he became fluent in Icelandic and familiarized himself with Icelandic literature and customs.

In 1814, while still living in Iceland, he finished his prize essay, "Investigation of the Origin of the Old Norse or Icelandic Language" (1818), in which he argued that Old Norse was related to the Germanic languages, including Gothic, to the Baltic and Slavic languages, and even to Classical Latin and Greek, which he grouped together under the label Thracian. He further hinted that Persian and Indo-Aryan languages might also be related. He also argued that the Germanic languages were not related to Basque, Greenlandic, Finnish or the Celtic languages (on this last instance he was wrong, and he later acknowledged this). The academy accepted the essay but suggested that he could have spent more time comparing Icelandic with Persian and other Asian languages. Because of this, Rask envisioned a trip to India to study Asian languages such as Sanskrit, which was already being taught by philologists such as Franz Bopp and Friedrich Schlegel in Germany. In 1814, after returning from Iceland, Rask worked as a sub-librarian at the University of Copenhagen library.

== Travel to India and Ceylon ==
In October 1816, Rask left Denmark on a literary expedition funded by the monarchy to investigate Asian languages and collect manuscripts for the University of Copenhagen library. He traveled first to Sweden, where he stayed for two years. During his time in Sweden, he took a short trip to Finland to study Finnish and published his Anglo-Saxon Grammar (1817) in Swedish.

That same year, he published the first complete editions of Snorri Sturluson's Prose Edda and the Poetic Edda. The editions were bilingual, with the original Icelandic accompanied by his Swedish translations. In 1819, he left Stockholm for St. Petersburg, Russia, where he wrote the paper "The Languages and Literature of Norway, Iceland, Sweden and Finland," which published in German in the sixth volume of the Vienna Jahrbücher. Leaving Russia, he traveled through Central Asia to Persia, where he stayed in Tabriz, Tehran, Persepolis, and Shiraz. In about six weeks, he was said to have mastered enough Persian to be able to converse freely.

In 1820, he traveled from Bushehr, Persia to Mumbai, India (then called Bombay), and during his residence there, he wrote (in English) "A Dissertation on the Authenticity of the Zend Language" (1821). From Bombay, he traveled through India to Sri Lanka (then called Ceylon), arriving in 1822. Soon afterwards, he wrote (in English) "A Dissertation respecting the best Method of expressing the Sounds of the Indian Languages in European Characters".

== Return to Denmark ==
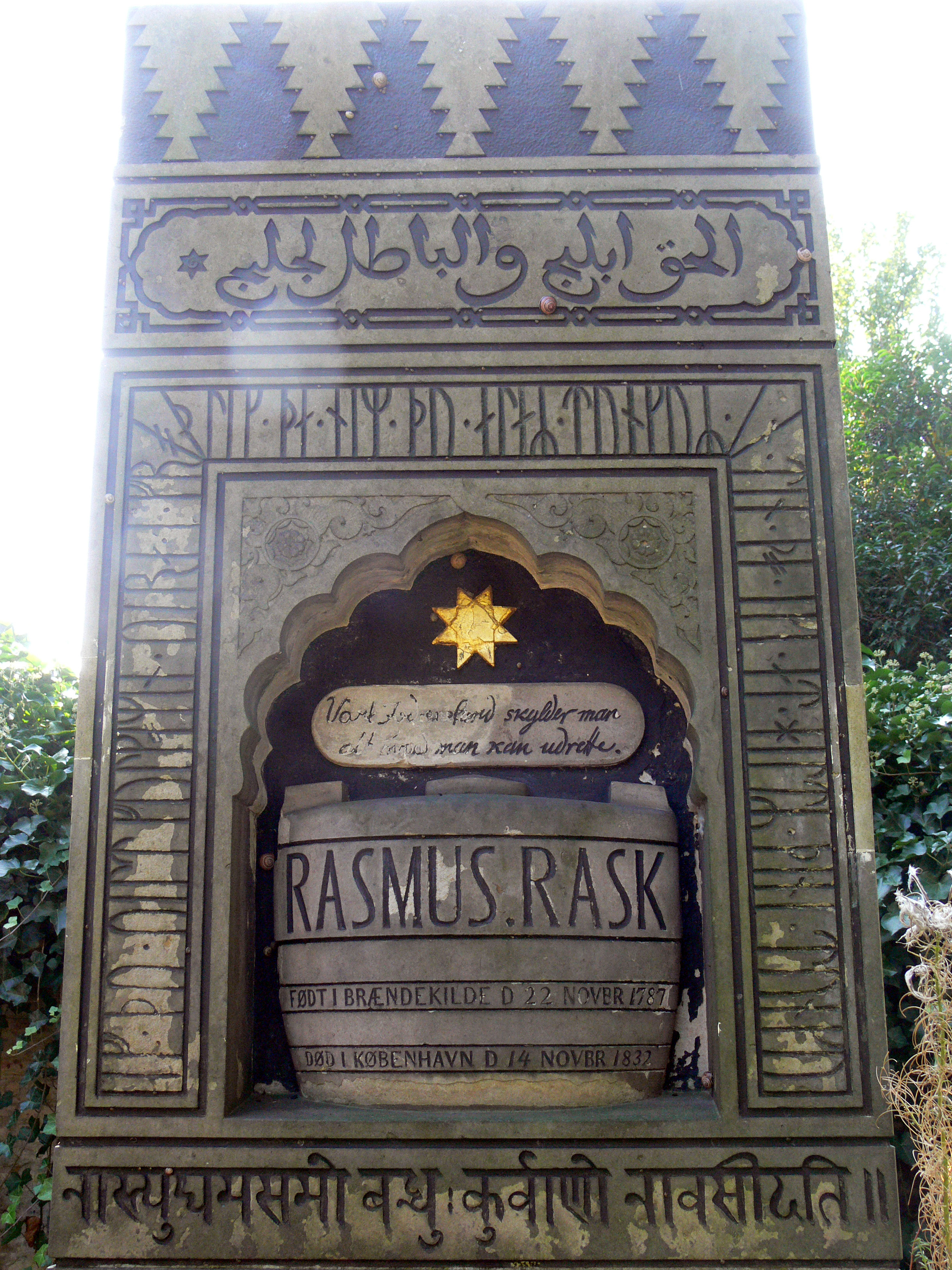
Rasmus Rask's grave at Assistens Cemetery, Copenhagen. Inscriptions in Danish, Arabic, Icelandic written in runes and Sanskrit. The Arabic text means: "Right is clear and falsehood is stammering." The Danish text means: "Our fatherland we owe all we can accomplish." The Icelandic runic text means: "If you wish to become perfect in knowledge, you must learn all the languages, and yet, do not neglect your native tongue or speech." The Sanskrit text means: "There is no friend greater than industry. He who does not work withers."

Rask returned to Copenhagen in May 1823, bringing a considerable number of manuscripts in Persian, Zend, Pali and Sinhala for Copenhagen libraries. In 1825, he was appointed a professor of literary history, and in 1829, and as a librarian at the University of Copenhagen. In 1831, just a year before his death, he was appointed professor of Eastern languages at the University of Copenhagen.

After his return to Denmark, Rask published Spanish Grammar (1824), Frisian Grammar (1825), Essay on Danish Orthography (1826), Treatise respecting the Ancient Egyptian Chronology (1827), Italian Grammar (1827), and Ancient Jewish Chronology previous to Moses (1828). He also published A Grammar of the Danish Language for the use of Englishmen (1830) and oversaw Benjamin Thorpe's English translation of his A Grammar of the Anglo-Saxon Tongue (1830).

== Death ==
He died of tuberculosis in Copenhagen in 1832, at Badstuestræde 17, where a plaque commemorating him is found. He is buried in Assistens Cemetery in Copenhagen. He bequeathed his manuscripts to his brother, who sold the Old Norse-Icelandic materials to the Arnamagnæan Commission in Copenhagen, which still holds them.

== Accomplishments ==
Rask was the first to show the relationship between the ancient Northern and the Western and Eastern Germanic languages, as well as to show their relationship with the Lithuanian, Slavonic, Greek and Latin languages. He formulated the first working version of what would later be known as "Grimm's Law" for the transmutation of consonants in the transition from the old Indo-European languages to Germanic, although he only compared Germanic and Greek, as Sanskrit was unknown to him at the time.

By 1822, he knew twenty-five languages and dialects, and he is believed to have studied twice as many. His numerous philological manuscripts were transferred to the Royal Danish Library at Copenhagen. Rask's Anglo-Saxon, Danish and Icelandic grammars were published in English editions by Benjamin Thorpe, Þorleifur Repp and George Webbe Dasent, respectively. Rask influenced many later linguists, and in particular Karl Verner carried on his inquiries into comparative and historical linguistics.

== Bibliography ==
- Vejledning til det Islandske eller gamle Nordiske Sprog (Introduction to the Icelandic or Old Norse Language), 1811; English translation published 1843
- Angelsaksisk sproglaere tilligemed en kort laesebog (Grammar of the Anglo-Saxon Tongue: With a Praxis), 1817; English translation published 1830
- Undersøgelse om det gamle Nordiske eller Islandske Sprogs Oprindelse (Investigation of the Origin of the Old Norse or Icelandic Language), 1818 (prize essay)
- Singalelisk Skriftlære (Sinhala Orthography), 1821
- Spansk Sproglære (Spanish Grammar), 1824
- Frisisk Sproglære (Frisian Grammar), 1825
- Dansk Retskrivningslære (Danish Orthography), 1826
- Om Zendsprogets og Zendavestas Ælde og Ægthed (On the Age and Authenticity of the Zend language and the Zend Avesta), 1826
- Italiænsk Formlære (Italian Grammar), 1827
- Den gamle Ægyptiske Tidsregning (Ancient Egyptian Chronology), 1827
- Vejledning til Akra-Sproget på Kysten Ginea (Introduction to the Accra language on the Guinea Coast), 1828
- Den ældste hebraiske Tidsregning indtil Moses efter Kilderne på ny bearbejdet og forsynet med et Kart over Paradis (Ancient Jewish Chronology previous to Moses according to the Sources newly reworked and accompanied by a Map of Paradise), 1828
- A Grammar of the Danish language for the use of Englishmen, 1830
- Ræsonneret lappisk Sproglære (Reasoned Sami Grammar), 1832
- Engelsk Formlære (English Grammar), 1832
