= Ron Offen =

American poet

Ronald C. “Ron” Offen (October 2, 1930 – August 9, 2010) was an American poet, playwright, critic, editor, and theater producer. He received an A.A. from Wright College in Chicago and an M.A. in English Language and Literature from the University of Chicago.

== Biography ==
Offen lived most of his life in Chicago and worked as an insurance investigator, editor, freelance writer, and theater producer. With R. R. Cuscaden he was the co-editor of Mainstream: A Quarterly Journal of Poetry (1957), one of the first publishers of Richard Brautigan. He was also co-editor with Cuscaden of Odyssey: Explorations in Contemporary Poetry and the Arts (1958–59), which published the early work of Charles Bukowski, LeRoi Jones (Amiri Baraka), David Ray, and others. He was a reviewer and executive editor of Chicago Literary Times (1962–1965), poetry editor of December (circa 1970–72), and columnist (“Poetry Beat”) for the Chicago Daily News (1974–75). From 1970 to 1977, he was a book reviewer for the Chicago Sun-Times, a drama critic for Chicago's weekly newspaper, Skyline, and worked in the Poets-in-the Schools program sponsored by the Illinois Arts Council.

== Theatre ==
In the 1970s he co-authored Dillinger: Dead or Alive? with Jay Robert Nash and wrote Cagney and Brando. In 1975 Offen and his second wife, Rosine (1930–2000), an Actors’ Equity actress and director, formed the theater company, The Peripatetic Task Force. He was the executive producer of this company, which produced avant-garde and original plays. He was also instrumental in creating Gangway Playhouse in Chicago, a summer outdoor free children's theater. The company's production of Jack Stokes's Wiley and The Hairy Man at Gangway Playhouse won a special Joseph Jefferson Award in 1977 for children's theater.

His drama, Fourplay, was produced in 1977 at the Barry Street Theater in Chicago, and his radio play, The Last Celebration, was aired on Chicago radio stations WFMT-FM by National Radio Theater, WNIB, and WHPK.

== Poetry ==
Offen's poetry appeared in Another Chicago Magazine, Epoch, 5AM, The Ledge, Margie, Poetry, Prairie Schooner, RATTLE, Rhino, The Salmon (Ireland), Zyzzyva, and numerous other journals. His fourth book of poems, God’s Haircut and Other Remembered Dreams, was nominated for a Pulitzer Prize. He was named a “Top Dog” in Chicago Poetry by chicagopoetry.com for his fifth book of poems, Off-Target. He received a first prize from the Academy of American Poets, University of Chicago, and First Prize For Poetry from the Chicago Poets and Writers Foundation. He was interviewed about his poetry by Studs Terkel on WFMT-FM and more recently by Judith Valente of National Public Radio on WBEZ-FM (Chicago).

In 1989 he founded Free Lunch, which published such renowned poets as Billy Collins, Stephen Dunn, Stuart Dybek, Donald Hall, X.J. Kennedy, Lisel Mueller, Robert Peters, and David Wagoner. In autumn 2009 after 42 issues Free Lunch ceased publication. In spring 2010 Rhino granted him its inaugural Rhino Paladin Award for "extraordinary long-term contributions to the quality and progress of poetry in Illinois."

In March 2013 Hearths (Ramparts, Inc., New Orleans, Los Angeles, and Pass Christian, MS) featured a September 10, 2009 interview conducted by editor Lenny Emmanuel of Offen, pp. 27–46. The interview was followed by an essay, “Remembering Ron,” by Offen's widow, Beverly, pp. 47–48. Emmanuel described this issue of Hearths as “an homage to Ron Offen, including poems he might have liked to publish. Moreover the publication is FREE, the same as was [Offen’s magazine] FREE LUNCH.” Among other writers, the issue included poems by Jared Carter, Billy Collins, and Mark Strand.

Offen lived in Glenview, Illinois with his third wife, Beverly.

== Bibliography ==
- Off-Target (2006). d’cypher Press. ISBN 0-9749550-1-9
- God’s Haircut and Other Remembered Dreams (1999). Pygmy Forest Press. ISBN 0-944550-50-9
- Answers, Questions (1996) The Inevitable Press. LC PS3565.F37
- Instead of Gifts (Poems for Poets) (1995). Pudding House Publications. LC PS3565.F355
- The Starving Poets’ Cookbook, editor (1994) Free Lunch Arts Alliance. ISBN 0-9643296-0-3
- Brando (1973) Henry Regnery Company. LCCN 72–11186
- Cagney (1972) Henry Regnery Company. LCCN 72–80934
- Dillinger: Dead or Alive? (1970), co-author with Jay Robert Nash, Henry Regnery Company. LCCN 73–105110
- Poet As Bad Guy (1963) Cyfoeth Publications. LC PS3565.F4
