= George H. Kendall =

President of the New York Bank Note Company (1854-1924)

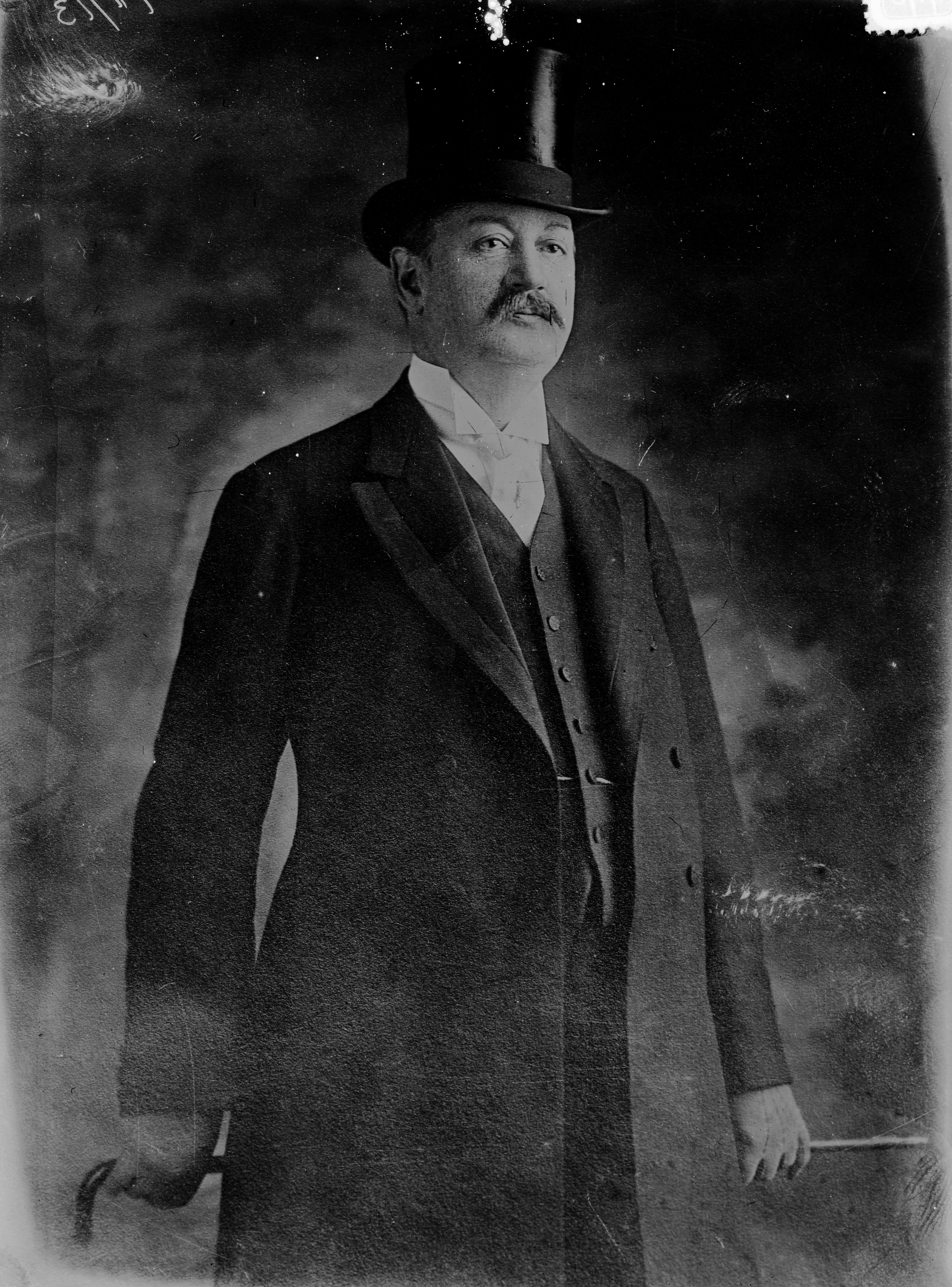
Kendall in 1913

George H. Kendall (c.1854–1924) was an American businessman and art collector. He was the president of the New York Bank Note Company, a printer of stock certificates.

== Biography ==
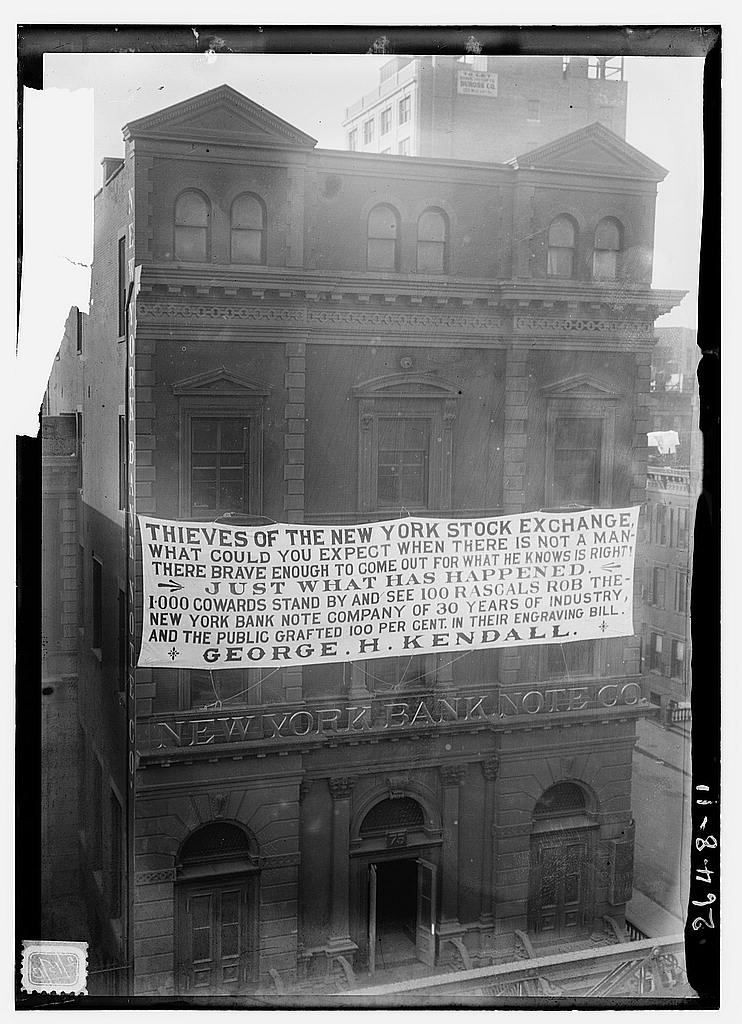
George H. Kendall sign at the New York Bank Note Company

He was born around 1854.

In 1877 Kendall founded the Kendall Bank Note Company and later changed the name to the New York Bank Note Company.

In 1892 he replaced Russell Sage as president of the company.

In 1896 he moved to the Grymes Hill neighborhood in Staten Island.

He had a long running dispute with the New York Stock Exchange because they would not list companies with securities that were engraved by him.

In 1913 he accused Senator Stephen J. Stilwell of demanding a bribe.

He died in 1924 at the Sherman Square Hotel. At the time of his death, he was estimated to be about 70 years old.
