= Crane and Company Old Stone Mill Rag Room =

Building in Dalton, Massachusetts

- U.S. National Register of Historic Places
- U.S. National Historic Landmark
- U.S. Historic district – Contributing property
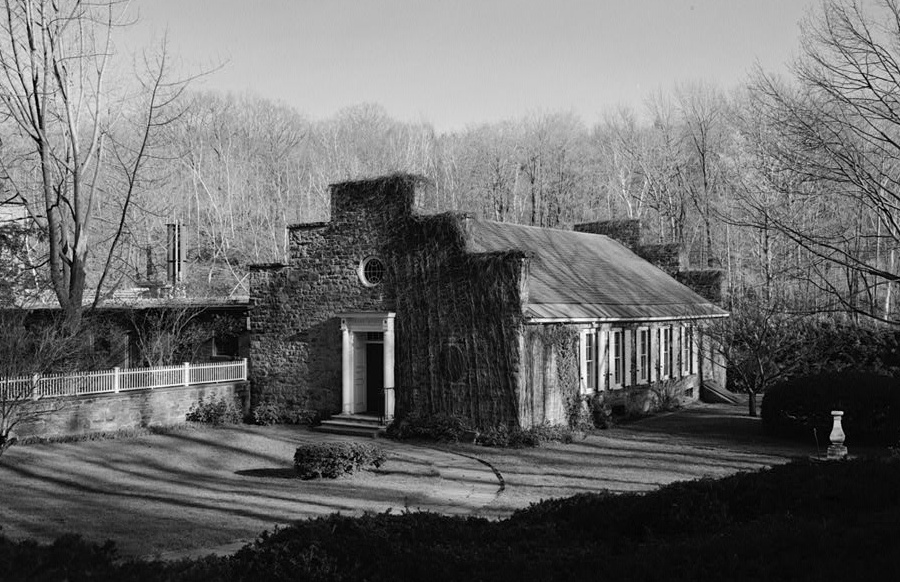
- HABS photo, 1988

- Location within Massachusetts Location within the United States
- Location: Dalton, Massachusetts
- Coordinates: 42°28′10″N 73°10′42″W
- Built: 1844
- Architect: Zenas Crane
- Part of: Cranesville Historic District (ID05001208)
- NRHP reference No.: 83004376

Significant dates
- Added to NRHP: July 1, 1983
- Designated CP: November 9, 2005

The Crane and Company Old Stone Mill Rag Room is one of the oldest surviving buildings (built in 1844) of Crane & Co., one of the oldest papermaking businesses in Berkshire County, Massachusetts. It is located in southwestern Dalton, on a site where paper has been manufactured since the early 19th century. The building, originally used for processing rags, has housed the Crane Museum of Papermaking since 1930, and was designated a National Historic Landmark in 1983.

Zenas Crane began making paper in Dalton in 1801, taking full ownership of an established operation at the Rag Room site in 1822. In the mid-1840s his sons constructed the Old Stone Mill, of which the Rag Room is the only surviving portion. The Rag Room is where Crane's grandson Winthrop Murray Crane learned the business; through his efforts Crane secured a monopoly contract to provide paper for the nation's currency, which it still holds today.

The Rag Room is a gray fieldstone building with a slate roof. Its interior is a large open space that houses exhibits and artifacts of the company's history.

== History ==
Zenas Crane (1777–1845) was educated in the processes of paper manufacturing in a mill owned by his brother Stephen in Newton Lower Falls, Massachusetts. After a stint at another paper mill in Worcester, Crane traveled west into Berkshire County in 1799, looking for potential papermaking sites. He found a highly desirable site in Dalton, but the owner, a local farmer, was unwilling to part with it. Crane instead established his business on a nearby parcel in 1801. Other papermakers followed over the next ten years, notably Henry Wiswell and David Carson, who acquired the more desirable site and established what became known as the Red Mill. Through a series of partnership and purchase transactions, Crane eventually acquired control of the Red Mill, taking full ownership in 1822.

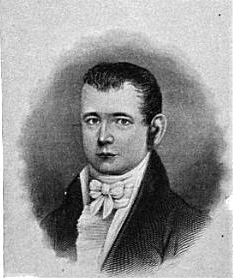
Zenas Crane, founder of the Crane mill complex in Dalton

In 1842 Zenas Crane retired, leaving control of the Red Mill to his sons Zenas Marshall Crane and James Brewer Crane. They founded Crane & Co., and set about expanding the business, beginning construction of what became known as the Stone Mill. The Rag Room was part of this construction effort, and was built in 1844. A visit in January 1851 inspired Herman Melville the second part of his short story The Paradise of Bachelors and the Tartarus of Maids. In 1869 the Stone Mill was damaged by fire; while it was being repaired in 1870 the Red Mill was destroyed by fire. The Stone Mill was then expanded, and also became known as the Pioneer Mill. The Stone Mill was used by the firm until the 1890s, when most of it was demolished, leaving only the Rag Room.

In 1930 the company adapted the Rag Room for use as the company museum, a role it has filled since. Following plans developed by architect Charles S. Keefe, the company reinforced the building's foundation with steel and concrete, filling in a number of its windows with stonework. The interior was significantly reworked, with new structural woodwork and flooring. Upon completion the interior was said to resemble that of the Old Ship Church in Hingham, Massachusetts. In 1967 the company retained the Olmsted Brothers firm to design landscaping of the area, although their work has since been compromised to some extent by later development on the property. The site was declared a National Historic Landmark and added to the National Register of Historic Places in 1983. In 2005 it became part of the listed Cranesville Historic District, which includes, among other properties, the 1816 home of Zenas Crane.

The Rag Room was where Zenas Marshall Crane's son, Winthrop Murray Crane (1853–1920), began his career in the papermaking business. In 1878 he was responsible for acquiring Crane & Co.'s exclusive government contract to manufacture the paper used in the currency of the United States. In addition to running Crane & Co. during the late 19th century, Murray Crane served as Governor of Massachusetts and United States Senator, and played an influential role in Republican Party politics.

== Description ==
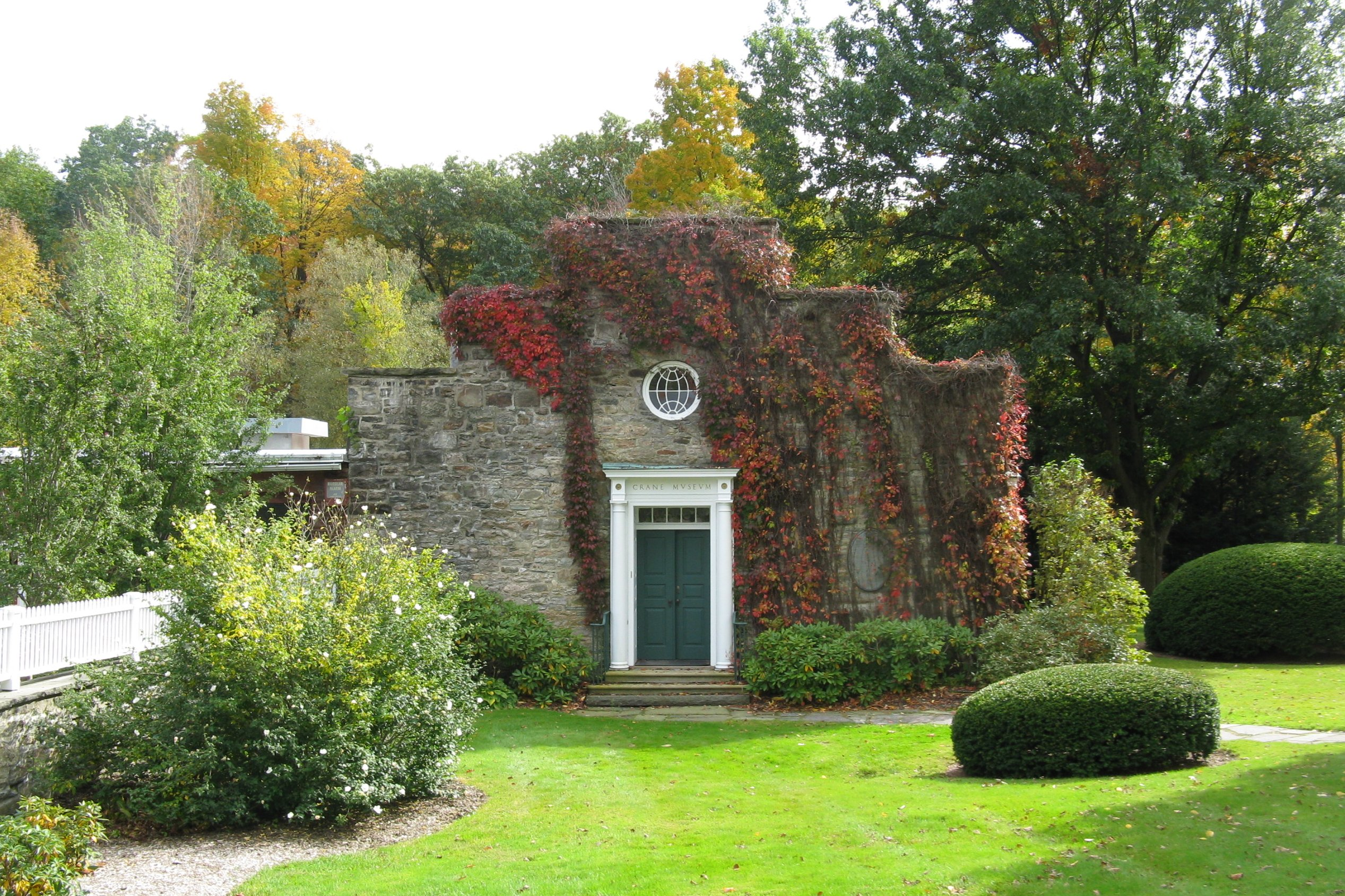
Museum, 2009

The Rag Room is a single-room single-story gray fieldstone building. It is three window bays wide and seven long, featuring stepped gable ends and a slate roof. It originally stood at the southwest part of the Stone Mill complex, and its north end was where it connected to the larger mill buildings. The building was where rags arriving at the mill were processed at the start of the papermaking operation.

In 1930 the northern facade was given a proper entranceway with transomed doors and Doric columns below a frieze identifying the building as the Crane Museum. Above this doorway a circular window was also added. The slate roof and its support beams were also replaced in 1930, but without altering the exterior lines of the building. A late 19th century brick addition to the east side of the building (not a part of the landmark designation) is screened from view by plantings. The interior of the building is a single large space in which artifacts from the company's history are displayed. Displays included tools used by Zenas Crane and a replica of the early vat process equipment used to make paper.

As of 2024, the museum is closed until further notice.

== See also ==
- List of National Historic Landmarks in Massachusetts
- National Register of Historic Places listings in Berkshire County, Massachusetts

== Sources ==
- Valente, A. J (2010). Rag Paper Manufacture in the United States, 1801–1900: A History, with Directories of Mills and Owners. Jefferson, NC: McFarland & Co. ISBN 9780786459971. OCLC 681620170.
- Toomey, Daniel; Quinn, Thomas (1892). Massachusetts of Today: A Memorial of the State, Historical and Biographical, Issued for the World's Columbian Exposition at Chicago. Boston, MA: Columbia Publishing Company. p. 610. OCLC 3251791.
