= The Paradise of Bachelors and the Tartarus of Maids =

"The Paradise of Bachelors and The Tartarus of Maids"
- Short story by Herman Melville
- Country: United States
- Language: English
- Genre: Short story

Publication
- Publisher: Harper's Magazine
- Media type: Print
- Publication date: April 1855

"The Paradise of Bachelors and the Tartarus of Maids" is a short story written by American writer Herman Melville. It first appeared in the April 1855 edition of Harper's Magazine. A combination of two sketches, one set in the center of London's legal industry and the other in a New England paper factory, this story can be read as a critique of industrilization, the oppression of women in factory work, and the legal system.

== Plot summary ==
In the first sketch, the London bachelors, all lawyers, scholars, or writers, enjoy a sumptuous meal in a cozy apartment near the Temple Bar. In the second sketch, the New England "maids" are young women working in a paper factory.

== Composition ==
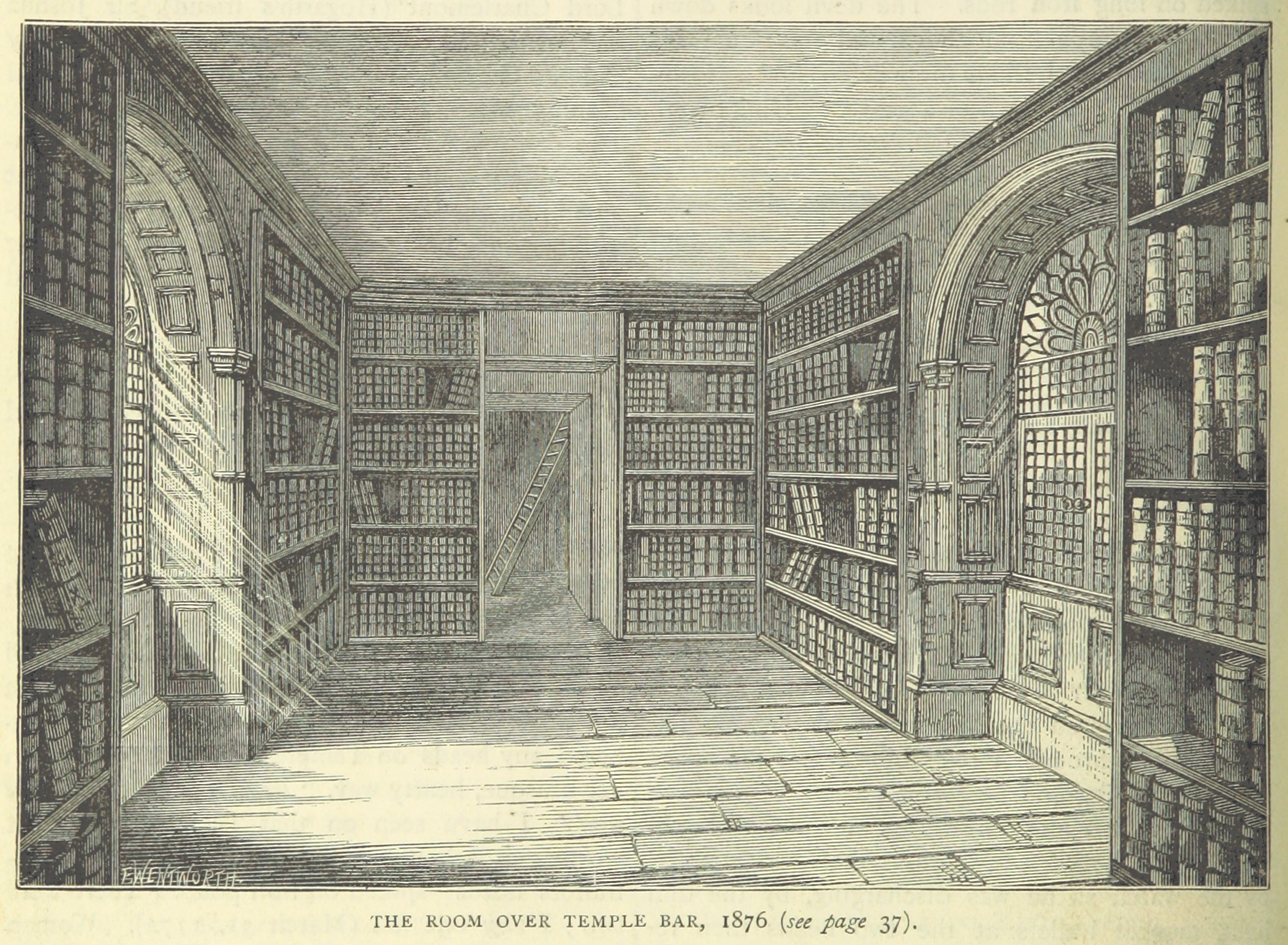
The Room over Temple Bar, 1876, Frederick Wentworth after WPH

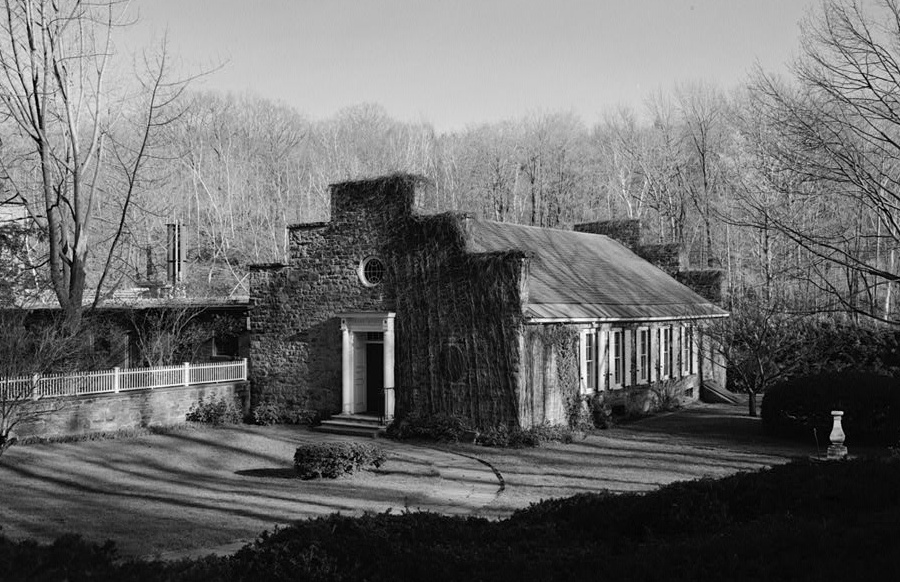
Crane and Company Old Stone Mill Rag Room in 1988

After the critical and commercial failures of Moby Dick and Pierre, Melville was struggling both personally and professionally. George William Curtis, an acclaimed writer and editorial advisor for Putnam's, wrote in 1856 that Melville had, "lost his prestige." Lacking money, he turned to the short story form. Between 1853 and 1856 he published fourteen stories and sketches in popular magazines. Seven of them appeared in Harper's. Mevlille had been a reader of Harper's since its inception. Scott Horton theorizes that Melville's reading of Bleak House, serialized in Harper's, was an influence on the story, particularly in its portrayal of the legal field.

The Paradise of Bachelors and the Tartarus of Maids was unsigned at its publication, but it was well-known that Melville was the author. He was paid forty dollars for the story.

Melville was inspired to write "The Paradise of Bachelors" by a trip to the Inns of Court in December 1849. He dined at Elm Court Temple on December 19, 1849 while on a trip to London. He was invited by Robert Francis Cooke, who was Melville's first publisher in London. Cooke appears in The Paradise of Bachelors under the initials R.F.C. Melville wrote in his journal that he had, "A glorious time till noon of night" with "a set of fine fellows." On the 20th and 22nd of December he dined at the Erectheum Club, St. James, which was known as a "junior Athaneum...deservedly celebrated for its good dinners."

"The Tartarus of Maids" was inspired by his visit to Carson's Old Red Paper Mill in Dalton, Massachusetts, in January 1851. Dalton was about a five-mile trip from his residence in Pittsfield, Massachusetts. The "Woedolor Mountains" in the story were inspired by Melville's travels on Mount Greylock.

== Reception ==
The diptcyh received little critical attention at the time of its publication, and the story was not reprinted in Melville's lifetime. It was not included in Melville' story collection The Piazza Tales. An April 1855 notice in the New York Home Journal identified the anonymous story as being written by Melville and deemed the diptych "written in his best vein."

Much has been made of the mythological allusions and parallels present within both sections as well as the diptych form itself. Jon Falsarella Dawson posits a parallel between the first and second parts of the story and the mythological Ancient Greek realms of the afterlife, Elysium and Tartarus. However, he argues that Melville subverts the qualifications for each realm. Instead of one's actions, one is destined to The Paradise of Bachelors or the Tartarus of Maids based on socioeconomic class and immutable characteristics, especially gender.

William B. Dillingham finds the two sections of the story to resemble Boccacio's Decameron and the frozen hell which appears in the ninth circle of Dante's Inferno. The Decameron features a group which isolates themselves from plague ravaging Florence, Italy. Underground, they talk and share stories. Dillingham relates this to the sequestered bachelors careless of the world around them. The Decameron is mentioned by name in The Paradise of Bachelors.

Jonathan Cook argues that the diptych was written primarily as a work of moral education, showing both the oppression of women in the industrial workpalce, and "showing that the latter was a truer indication of the human condition." David Dowling extends Melville's critique of industrilization to an acknowledgement of the privilege necessary to produce art. He believes the story, along with many of Melville's works, uses irony and humor to critique economic exploitation , and that these worlds, while seemingly separate, are deeply interdependent. He argues that Melville, in keeping with Cook's view, was compelled to compare and therefore critique these two spaces because, "For Melville, privilege corrupts literature."

Robin West extends the social critique of the story by seeing the text as an indictment by Melville of nineteenth century Anglo-American common law. Melville was "a law buff" and his father-in-law and patron, Lemuel Shaw, served as Chief Justice of the Massachusetts Supreme Court. West notes the lax rules on negligence and employment law, especially in the United States. She also highlights the byzantine, complex rules and procedure of British law which kept many cases "at a comfortable arms-length." She argues that Melville, sensing this, aimed to criticize the apathy and "lack of any...moral sentiment" felt by many lawyers. While discussion of the law is concspicuolsy absent from the Paradise of Bachelors, except for two perfunctory mentions, for West, the story's connective tissue is "law's total abdication from the industrial scene."
