= United States postal notes =

U.S. Treasury money orders

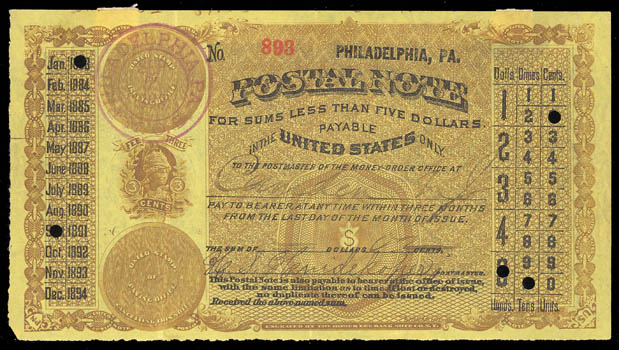
An 1883 postal note of Homer Lee Bank Note Co., Philadelphia 7 Sept 1883.

Postal notes were the specialized money order successors to the United States Department of the Treasury's postage and fractional currency. They were created so Americans could safely and inexpensively (for a three cent fee) send sums of money under $5 to distant places.

Postal Notes were privately produced by three different firms in six design types during three four-year contracts. Developed under Postmaster General Walter Q. Gresham, they were first issued at the nation's post offices on Monday, September 3, 1883. Numerous "first day" souvenir notes have survived.

Government officials, wary of the continuing problem of postal theft, initially mandated that the notes could be cashable only in the city named by the purchaser. Engraved and printed by the Homer Lee Bank Note Company, the first two designs (Types I and II) had a space for the postal clerk to indicate where the note was being sent. If stolen en route, the note had no value, as it could not be cashed in any other city. All Postal Notes were printed on a watermarked security paper produced by Crane & Co. that features a unique watermark. Type I notes were printed on a yellow security paper blank that was about 10% larger than all subsequent issues. Type II and later notes were printed on a creamy white security paper.

In January 1887, Congress changed the applicable law. Rather than being cashable at only one named post office, it decided that newly issued Postal Notes could be cashable at any money order office – the system's larger and busier offices. To comply with the new law, "Any Money Order Office" was rubber-stamped or hand written in place of a specific paying city on the Type II forms. These notes are called Type II-A.

To comply with the law, Homer Lee's engravers added the words "ANY MONEY ORDER OFFICE" in a level line into the second design's printing plates. Due to the short period of time between the passage of the new law and the start of the second production contract (which Homer Lee did not receive), few post offices ordered and issued Type III Postal Notes.

The American Bank Note Company of New York was the winning bidder for the second Postal Note engraving and printing contract. Thomas F. Morris, creator of the acclaimed designs for U.S. currency and stamps, as well as stock and bond certificates, etc., was assigned to design and engrave the new Postal Note (Type IV). No major changes were required during American's four-year contract. The only change noted during ABNCo's contract was the decade change on the date line from "188___" to "189___." All Postal Notes issued with the American Bank Note Company logotype are Type IV.

The third and final Postal Note engraving and printing contract extended from September 1891 to June 30, 1894. Dunlap & Clarke of Philadelphia won the competition. Their design, unchanged during the length of their contract, is catalogued as Type V.

Between 1883 and 1894, some 70.8 million Postal Notes were issued, used as intended, then destroyed. Approximately 1,500 have survived for modern collectors and historians. Thanks to the government's publicity, the first and final designs are the most "common" notes. No publicity was produced for the other design changes. Type III notes are the design rarities of the series.

In 2022, some collectors on Paper Money Forum started "The 1883-1894 United States Postal Note Census Project". According to its latest report, about 2,300 postal notes have been verified.

== Postal note identification guide ==
The following brief descriptions will help you quickly identify any Postal Note issued during the 1883-1894 era. The name of the producing bank note company is always found at the bottom center of the note's front side.

- Type I: Engraved and printed by the Homer Lee Bank Note Company; printed on yellow paper.
- Type II: Engraved and printed by the Homer Lee Bank Note Company; printed on creamy white paper; the paying city is hand-written.
- Type II-A: Engraved and printed by the Homer Lee Bank Note Company; rubber-stamped or hand-written "ANY MONEY ORDER OFFICE" appears on the paying office line.
- Type III: Engraved and printed by the Homer Lee Bank Note Company; "ANY MONEY ORDER OFFICE" engraved in straight line.
- Type IV: Engraved and printed by the American Bank Note Company.
- Type V: Printed by Dunlap & Clarke of Philadelphia.

== Postal note stamps ==
This was a series of 18 stamps available at U.S. post offices from 1945 to 1951. They were used for sending small amounts of money. Printed in grey and black with a simple uniform design, they ranged in value from 1 to 90 cents. Their Scott catalogue designations are PN 1 to 18. In used condition collectors can purchase all of them at very low cost.
