= Paul Parmalee =

American zooarchaeologist (1926-2006)

Paul Parmalee (1926-2006) was an early worker in the field of zooarchaeology.

Parmalee was born in Mansfield, Ohio. He studied at Ohio University (bachelor's degree in zoology in 1948), University of Illinois (master's degree in ecology in 1949), and Texas A&M (Ph.D in degree wildlife management in 1952). He spent most of his professional career at the Illinois State Museum, but was recruited by the University of Tennessee in 1973. At Illinois he trained many students who went on to become prominent in the field.

== Sources ==
UT Press release July 4, 2006
