= Margie (journal) =

American literary journal

Margie, also known as the American Journal of Poetry, is an annual literary journal, based in Chesterfield, Missouri that features the work of the nation's leading poets. The journal was established in 2000 and is dedicated to the memory of Marjorie J. Wilson (1955-1977). The founder and editor-in-chief is Robert Nazarene. The journal sponsors several prestigious contests, including the annual Robert E. Wilson & Ruth I. Wilson Best Poetry Book Contest.

Among the notable writers whose work has appeared in Margie are Sherman Alexie, Jacob M. Appel, Julianna Baggott, Kate Braverman, W. S. Di Piero, Annie Finch, Alice Friman, Michael Harper, Terry Hertzler, Tony Hoagland, Allison Joseph, Ron Offen, Mark Rudman, Enid Shomer, David Wagoner, Laura Madeline Wiseman and R. Scott Yarbrough.

== See also ==
- List of literary magazines
