= Crane Currency =

American manufacturer of cotton based paper products

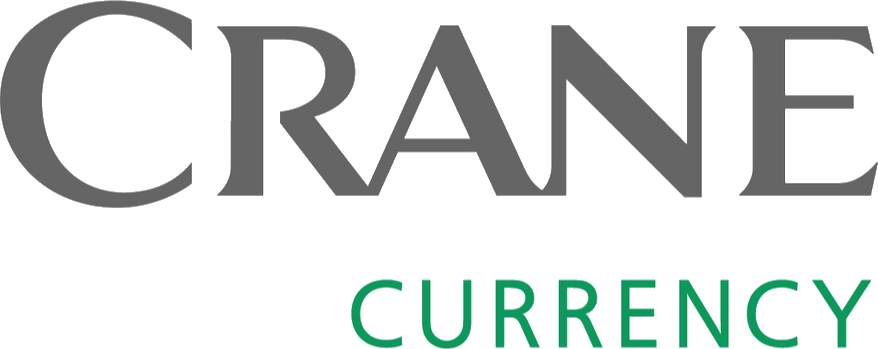
- Industry: Paper
- Founded: Dalton, Massachusetts, U.S. (1801; 225 years ago)
- Founder: Zenas Crane, Henry Wiswall and John Willard
- Headquarters: Dalton, Massachusetts, U.S.
- Key people: Dr. Aleta Richards, President, Crane Currency
- Products: Banknotes, currency paper, security features for protection against counterfeits
- Revenue: US$450 million+ (2018)
- Number of employees: 1,300+
- Parent: Crane NXT
- Website: cranecurrency.com

Crane Currency is an American manufacturer that supplies central banks with design services, currency papers, and banknote printing services as well as anti-counterfeiting technology to issuing authorities and brand owners. Crane Currency is headquartered in Dalton, Massachusetts. The company was originally named Crane & Co. and is owned by Crane NXT.

== History ==
Stephen Crane was the first in the Crane family to become a papermaker, buying his first mill, "The Liberty Paper Mill," in 1770. He sold currency-type paper to engraver Paul Revere, who printed paper money for the American Colonies. In 1801, Crane was founded by Zenas Crane, Henry Wiswall and John Willard. It was the very first paper mill in the United States west of the Connecticut River. The company's original mill had a daily output of 20 posts (1 post = 125 sheets). Shortly after, in 1801, Crane began making cotton currency paper for local, as well as regional banks. In 1844 Crane developed a method to embed parallel silk threads in banknote paper to denominate notes and deter counterfeiting.

In 1879, Crane grew when Winthrop M. Crane won a contract to deliver U.S. currency paper to the Bureau of Engraving and Printing in Washington, D.C. To shore up resources for this contract, Crane expanded its capacity with four new mills engineered by world-renowned mill architect David H. Tower. Tower, a native of Dalton, would remain connected to the development of the company throughout his career, having gotten his first start in mill architecture working as an apprentice to rebuild Zena Crane's Red Mill in 1846. Crane produced both the yellow (issued in 1883–1884) and the white (1884–1894) watermarked security papers for the nation's Postal Notes. These early money orders were produced for sale throughout the postal system by the Homer Lee Bank Note Company (1883–1887), the American Bank Note Company (1887–1891), and Dunlap & Clarke (1891–1894). In 1922, Crane & Co. incorporated, with Frederick G. Crane elected as president.

In 2002, Crane purchased the company Tumba Bruk from the Central Bank of Sweden (Riksbank) and operates this today as Crane AB.

In 2016, Crane announced plans to build a new banknote printing facility and customer experience center in the country of Malta. This announcement was delivered by then Maltese Prime Minister Joseph Muscat. The facility is 15,000 square meters in size with space for three print lines. The facility, budgeted at US $100 million, started operations in spring of 2018.

In 2017 Crane Currency was sold to Crane Co., now known as Crane Holdings.

In 2023, Crane Currency and its sister company Crane Payment Innovations (CPI) formed Crane NXT (NYSE: 'CXT') separating from Crane Co. (NYSE: 'CR').

== Crane Stationery ==
Originally, the operations making paper for writing and for currency were closely related, however they became more independent over the decades. By the 2010s, the company had been making stationery items in North Adams, Massachusetts for some time, while the currency business was centered in Dalton. Stationery sales accounted for less than 10% of the company's revenue. In 2015, the company spun off its stationery division, via a management buyout. The new company retained the North Adams factory, as well as Crane & Co. and related trademarks. In 2018, Mohawk Fine Papers purchased Crane Stationery. Mohawk is a family-owned company headquartered in Cohoes, New York. In 2020, Mohawk announced its intention to close the North Adams factory, citing market disruptions due to the COVID-19 pandemic. Noting that some paper companies had fared quite well during the pandemic, the chief executive of Mohawk said "If you are making toilet paper, you are a winner..." Mohawk planned to manufacture items under the Crane trademarks at its Cohoes factory. In March of 2024 Crane was sold to WP Strategic Holdings, a private investment and consulting firm based in Albany, NY.

In 1960, Advertising Age noted an advertising campaign for Crane writing papers. The advertisements presented examples of letters written by fictional people.

== Crane NXT ==
Crane NXT is a publicly traded company (NYSE = “CXT”). Besides Crane Currency, it owns businesses that provide electronics and associated software for payment systems and merchandising. It owns Crane Payment Innovations and OpSec Security.

== Products ==
=== MOTION ===
Crane Currency's MOTION security technology is used to protect high value banknotes from counterfeiting worldwide. The design involves a micro-lens array interacting with graphics far smaller than any microprinting.

Sweden's 1000 kronor banknote, released in 2006, was the first banknote to use Crane's MOTION technology. A 2007 AP article revealed that the US Bureau of Engraving and Printing would use the new security thread containing "650,000 tiny lenses" (now believed to be over one million lenses per inch of thread). It is currently being used on the $100 bill design released on October 8, 2013.

In 2008, Crane acquired Visual Physics, a subsidiary of Nanoventions, based in Atlanta, Georgia. This purchase gave Crane exclusive control of the MOTION micro-optic security technology that is used for the protection of banknotes.

In 2014, Crane introduced its second security thread based on its micro-optic technology. The smaller lenses used in RAPID micro-optic thread enable even faster movement and high color contrast. RAPID uses dynamic movement as the key to easy authentication. Fast moving and unambiguous movement with just a modest tilt of the note are the feature's trademark.

MOTION SURFACE, introduced in 2017, is based on miniaturized MOTION micro-optic lenses that produce fluid movement and three dimensional effects. It is applied as a stripe as opposed to being integrated as a thread in paper. Therefore, MOTION SURFACE can be applied in the printing works on all manner of substrates including polymer.

The RAPID Vision security thread was announced in January 2023. It is a micro-optic feature that produces multicolor motion effects designed for quick, overt authentication by the public. It has since been used in banknotes issued in Guyana, Kazakhstan, and Poland.

== Presidents/CEOs ==
- Frederick G. Crane (1922–1923)
- Winthrop M. Crane Jr. (1923–1951)
- Bruce Crane (1951–1975)
- Benjamin J. Sullivan (1975–1986)
- Thomas A. White (1986–1995)
- Lansing Crane (1995–2007)
- Charles Kittredge (2007–2011)
- Stephen DeFalco (2011–2018)
- Annemarie Watson (2018–2020)
- Sam Keayes (2020–2024)
- Dr. Aleta Richards (2025–present)

== See also ==
- Crane and Company Old Stone Mill Rag Room
