= Þorleifur Repp =

19th century Icelandic scholar and philologist

Þorleifur Guðmundsson Repp (also spelled Thorleifur Repp; 6 July 1794 in Reykjadalur, Iceland – 4 December 1857 in Copenhagen, Denmark) was an Icelandic scholar and philologist. He studied at the University of Copenhagen, but in 1826 failed his defense. He later worked variously as a writer, journalist, translator, librarian, and language teacher. In 1825, he worked as a sub-librarian at the Advocates Library in Edinburgh, Scotland. In 1837, he returned to Copenhagen, where in 1838, he edited the newspaper Dagen. In 1848–1850, he edited the newspaper Tiden. His published translations include a translation of the Laxdæla saga into Latin (1826) and a translation of Rasmus Rask's Danish Grammar into English (1846).

== Family ==
Þorleifur Repp was the son of Rosu Eigelsdr and Gudmandur Bodvarssonar; he married Petrine Nicoline Thestrup (1803-1889) in Copenhagen on 12 Sep 1826. They had four children:

- Anne Hill Olivia Agnes Repp born 1830 in Edinburgh, died 1913 in Yorkshire.
- Rosa Anne Elizabeth Saga Repp born c1831 in Edinburgh, died 1902 in Northumberland. She married Captain Henry Powlett Shafto Orde in 1861.
- Sidney Douglas Repp born 1834 in Edinburgh, died c1905 in Queensland, Australia.
- Moses Steven William Hamilton Repp, born c1843 in Copenhagen, died 1918 in Yorkshire.
