= Natalie Hershberger =

American taekwondo practitioner

Natalie Hershberger (born February 22, 2004) is an American taekwondo athlete and author of Kick it Fit with Natalie and Tough Girls Finish First. Beginning in 2016, Hershberger wrote a regular column featured in the Tae Kwon Do Times known as "Kickchat with Nat", focused on taekwondo training.

Hershberger began training in taekwondo at the age of five. She is a current USA Taekwondo National Team Member with the goal of representing the United States in the 2024 Summer Olympics. Hershberger has won two AAU Junior Olympic Games titles (2012 and 2013) and seven national championship titles (AAU and USAT). Hershberger was named a 2015 Sports Illustrated SportsKid of the Year finalist (SKOTY), making her the first ever martial artist to be recognized as a finalist.

Awards	Sponsor
Ohio Senate Resolution #326	129th General Assembly
2015 Sportskid of the Year Finalist	Sports Illustrated Kids
2015 Competitor of the Year	Tae Kwon Do Times
Ohio Senate Resolution #256	129th General Assembly

Competition	Medal
2012 AAU National Championships	Bronze
2012 AAU Junior Olympics	Gold
2013 USAT National Championships	Gold
2013 AAU Junior Olympics	Gold
2014 AAU National Championships	Gold
2014 USAT National Championships	Silver
2015 U.S. Open	Gold
2015 USAT National Championship	Gold
2015 AAU National Championship	Gold
2015 Pan Am Youth Open Championship	Gold
2016 USAT National Championships	Bronze
2016 AAU National Championships	Gold
2016 AAU National Team Trials	Gold
2017 Spanish Open	Gold
2017 USAT National Championships	Gold
2017 AAU National Team Trials	Gold
2018 U.S. Open	Gold
2018 European President's Cup	Gold
2018 USAT National Championships	Gold
2018 AAU National Team Trials	Gold
2018 Pan American President's Cup	Gold
2019 U.S. Open	Gold
2019 Belgian Open	Gold
2019 Dutch Open	Bronze
2019 Pan American Junior Championships	Gold
2019 Pan American President's Cup	Gold
2020 U.S. Open	Gold
