= Literal Latte =

- Discipline: Literary journal
- Language: English
- Edited by: Jenine Gordon Bockman and Jeffrey Michael Gordon Bockman

Publication details
- History: 1994 - present
- Publisher: WordSci, Inc. (United States)

Standard abbreviations
- ISO 4: Literal Latte

Indexing
- ISSN: 1084-3957

Links
- Journal homepage

Literal Latte is a quarterly literary journal based in New York City and edited by Jenine Gordon Bockman. It was founded in June 1994 by Jenine Gordon Bockman and Jeffrey Michael Gordon Bockman. The journal published its last print edition in July 2003, but has continuously maintained an online version since November 1996. A comprehensive re-design of the site was launched in November 2008, designed and developed by Tyler C. Gore, who has also served as art director and editor since that time.

Among serious, non-commercial literary journals, Literal Latte took an atypical approach to publication and distribution: instead of the customary "perfect bound" journal format, Literal Latte was printed on newsprint in tabloid format. The relatively low cost of printing on newsprint made it economical for the publishers to distribute the magazine for free at bookstores, universities, and newsstands throughout New York City, thus achieving an unusually high circulation rate for a literary magazine—as high as 30,000 copies per issue, according to the publishers—as well as attracting local and (eventually) national advertisers, offsetting the cost of production.

Works published in Literal Latte have subsequently been short-listed for the Pushcart Prize, Best American Poetry and Best American Essays. The journal sponsors annual essay, fiction, and poetry competitions (as well as the unusual "Food Verse" competition) and presents an annual reading series at the National Arts Club in Gramercy, Manhattan.

Although Literal Latte has often published pieces from well-known literary writers and poets, it has always placed an emphasis on showcasing unpublished or relatively unknown writers, claiming that "98%" of its published pieces come from "the so-called slush pile." Submissions are accepted year-round, and simultaneous submissions are permitted.

Notable contributors have included Ray Bradbury, Robert Olen Butler, Allen Ginsberg, Terry Hertzler, Catherine Ryan Hyde, Phillip Lopate, Carole Maso, Claudia Rankine, Lynne Sharon Schwartz, Jacob M. Appel, Gloria Steinem and John Updike.

An anthology of selected works from Literal Latte's first fifteen years of publication, entitled The Anthology: Highlights from Fifteen Years of a Unique "Mind Stimulating" Literary Magazine, was published in January 2009.

== See also ==
- List of literary magazines
