= Homer Lee Bank Note Company =

Defunct stamp and banknote manufacturer

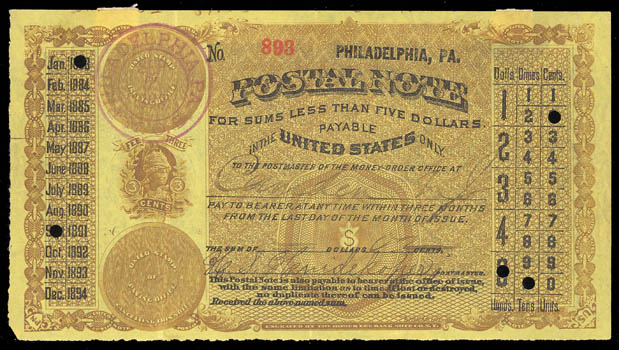
An 1883 United States postal note of Homer Lee Bank Note Co., Philadelphia 7 Sept 1883

The Homer Lee Bank Note Company produced postage stamps and currency and was founded in New York City by artist, engraver, and inventor Homer Lee. In 1891, it was absorbed into the American Bank Note Company.

The Homer Lee Company grew in the 1880s and 1890s by producing engraved stock and bond certificates, for railroads and mining companies. In 1883, it won the competition to engrave and print the first postal notes for the postal system during the contract's first four-year period. Both the yellow and the white security papers for these early money orders were produced by Crane and Company in Dalton, Massachusetts. Homer Lee hired Thomas F. Morris, perhaps best known for his later work as the government's Chief of the Bureau of Engraving, from the American Bank Note Company to be his superintendent. The Homer Lee Bank Note Company produced currency and postage stamps for numerous foreign governments before amassing debts and being taken over by the American Bank Note Company in 1891.

== See also ==
- Postage stamps and postal history of the United States
- Scripophily
- New York Bank Note Company
- American Bank Note Company

== References and sources ==
Sources

- New York Times, September 4, 1883 (New Postal Notes)
