= Roy Repp =

American stunt driver

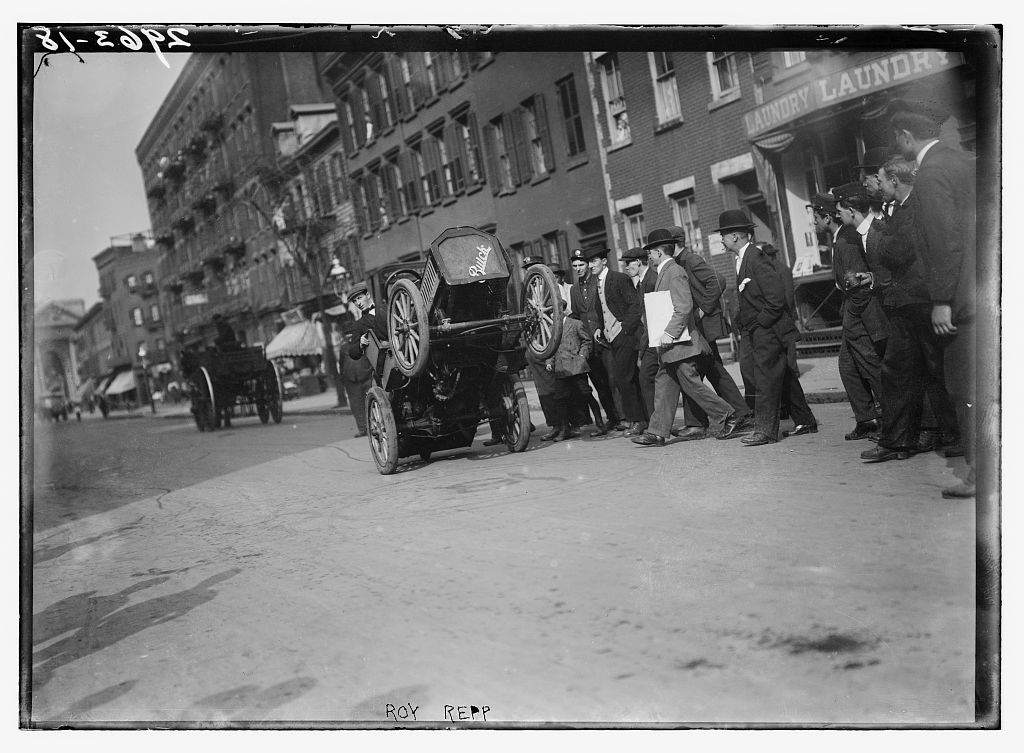

Roy (Leroy) Repp (May 12, 1882 – January 4, 1934) was an American stunt driver.

Although many sources claim he was an Australian, there is evidence that he was actually an American born in Mansfield, Ohio, United States.

Repp was born on May 12, 1882, in Mansfield, Ohio and died on January 4, 1934, in Shreveport Hospital, Louisiana as a result of a motor racing accident; he was working as a race starting flagman at an IMCA big car event held at the Shreveport Fairgrounds on October 29, 1933, when a wheel came off a racing car and hit him.

One of Repp's stunt cars was Maude the Motor Mule. Repp could pull a lever, causing a heavy weight beneath the car to move forward or backward—shifting the car's center of gravity and making it rear up on its hind wheels or front wheels.
