= Homer Lee =

American engraver, artist, and inventor

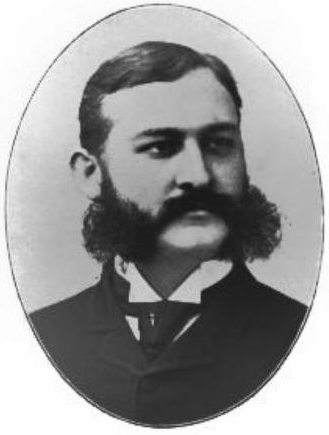
- Born: May 18, 1851; Mansfield, Ohio
- Died: January 25, 1923 (aged 71); New York, New York
- Resting place: Sleepy Hollow Cemetery
- Occupation(s): Engraver, inventor, entrepreneur
- Spouse: Charlotte Riddle (m. 1891)
- Children: 2

Homer Lee (1851–1923) was an American engraver, artist, inventor, and entrepreneur.

== Biography ==
Homer Lee was born in Mansfield, Ohio on May 18, 1851. He was the founder and president of the Homer Lee Bank Note Company in New York City, also vice president of the Franklin Lee Bank Note Company, and president of the Hamilton Bank Note Company. Married to Charlotte Riddle in 1891, daughter of a prominent Philadelphia-area cotton manufacturer, he had two sons: Leander and Homer Jr. Socially active, he invented the Homer Lee rotary steel plate printing system, as well as numbering devices used by the United States Treasury.

In 1883, his company was awarded the first four-year contract to engrave and produce Postal Notes, an early form of money order, for the post office department. His company produced notes catalogued as Types I, II, II-A, and III. Type III is the rarest design of the 1883–1894 series. His company was purchased by the American Bank Note Company in 1891. He died at the age of 73 on Thursday, January 25, 1923, and is buried next to his wife in the Sleepy Hollow Cemetery in Tarrytown, NY.
