= 1991 Kentucky Derby =

Horse race

117th Kentucky Derby
- Kentucky Derby
- Grade I stakes race
- Location: Churchill Downs
- Date: May 4, 1991
- Winning horse: Strike the Gold
- Jockey: Chris Antley
- Trainer: Nick Zito
- Owner: Brophy, Condren, Cornacchia
- Conditions: Fast
- Surface: Dirt
- Attendance: 135,554

The 1991 Kentucky Derby was the 117th running of the Kentucky Derby. The race took place on May 4, 1991, with 135,554 people in attendance.

== The Road to the 1991 Kentucky Derby ==
Heading into the Derby, it was seen as a wide-open race with multiple horses having a chance at victory.

Fly So Free had an impressive resume coming into the race. He won the Grade-1 Champagne Stakes, the Grade-1 Breeders' Cup Juvenile, the Grade-2 Hutcheson Stakes, the Grade-2 Fountain of Youth Stakes and the Grade-1 Florida Derby. Through these wins, he had already defeated most of the field in various races.

Best Pal also had an impressive resume with multiple wins at the Grade-3 1990 Balboa Stakes, the Grade-2 Del Mar Futurity, the Grade-1 Norfolk Stakes and the Grade-1 Hollywood Futurity. He also finished ahead of Sea Cadet at the 1991 Santa Anita Derby.

Hansel had won the Grade-3 July 1990 Tremont Breeders' Cup Stakes, the Grade-2 September 1990 Arlington-Washington Futurity Stakes, the March 1991 Grade-2 Jim Beam Stakes(where he defeated Wilder Than Ever) and the April 1991 Grade-2 Lexington Stakes. However, he was defeated soundly twice by Fly So Free.

Strike the Gold had won the April 1991 Blue Grass Stakes defeating favorite Fly So Free by a half-length after finishing 2nd to Fly So Free at the 1991 Florida Derby.

Green Alligator captured the April 1991 Grade-3 California Derby in his only stakes win.

Quintana was victorious at the March 1991 Grade-3 Rebel Stakes winning over fellow 1991 Kentucky Derby competitor, Corporate Report.

Alydavid won the Grade-3 April 1991 Derby Trial Stakes and was a half-brother of Strike the Gold.

Sea Cadet won the January 1991 El Camino Real Derby and the March 1991 San Felipe Stakes, placing multiple positions ahead of Green Alligator.

Mane Minister picked up smaller victories in the January 1991 listed Santa Catalina Stakes and the 1991 listed Pirate Cove Stakes.

Paulrus, Another Review, Corporate Report, Happy Jazz Band, Forty Something, Lost Mountain, Subordinated Debt and Wilder Than Ever had never won a stakes race and were seen as wildcards.

Dinard won the Grade-2 1991 San Rafael Stakes. He defeated Best Pal in what was called "the single most compelling performance of the year" in the Grade-1 1991 Santa Anita Derby. He was considered an early favorite for the Kentucky Derby, but suffered a foreleg injury and was declared out.

Olympio, winner of the 1991 Arkansas Derby, who had traded wins with Dinard, was also seen as a possible candidate for the Kentucky Derby. However, his owners decided to skip the race for the 1991 Preakness Stakes, where he finished 7th.

Cahill Road was also seen as a contender after winning the April 1991 Wood Memorial Stakes, but injured his left front leg in the victory and was retired.

== Full results ==
Finished	Post	Horse	Jockey	Trainer	Owner	Time / behind
1st	5	Strike the Gold	Chris Antley	Nick Zito	Brophy, Condren, Cornacchia	2:03.08
2nd	15	Best Pal	Gary Stevens	Gary F. Jones	Golden Eagle Farm	
3rd	10	Mane Minister	Alex Solis	J. Paco Gonzalez	T. McCaffery & J. Toffan	
4th	8	Green Alligator	Corey Nakatani	Murray W. Johnson	Anderson Fowler	
5th	1	Fly So Free	José A. Santos	Scotty Schulhofer	Thomas F. Valando	
6th	16	Quintana	Angel Cordero Jr.	David C. Cross Jr.	Gary Garber	
7th	11	Paulrus	Shane Sellers	Steven C. Penrod	Hermitage Farms	
8th	4	Sea Cadet	Chris McCarron	Ronald McAnally	VHW Stable, Inc. Lessee	
9th	12	Corporate Report	Pat Day	D. Wayne Lukas	Overbrook Farm & D. W. Lukas	
10th	6	Hansel	Jerry D. Bailey	Frank L. Brothers	Lazy Lane Farms	
11th	14	Happy Jazz Band	Cash Asmussen	Philip A. Gleaves	Straus-Medina Ranch	
12th	9	Lost Mountain	Herb McCauley	Tom Bohannan	Loblolly Stable	
13th	13	Another Review	Art Madrid, Jr.	John P. Campo	Buckland Farm	
14th	2	Alydavid	Corey Black	Philip M. Hauswald	David's Farm	
15th	3	Wilder Than Ever	Joe Deegan	John E. Churchman, Jr.	Raymond Cottrell, Sr.	
16th	7	Forty Something	Andrea Seefeldt	Reginald S. Vardon	Sam Morrell	

- Winning Breeder: Calumet Farm; (KY)

== Payout ==
Post	Horse	Win	Place	Show
4	Strike the Gold	$ 11.60	6.20	5.40
10	Best Pal		6.40	5.40
7	Mane Minister			25.60

- $2 Exacta: (4–10) Paid $73.40

== See also ==
- 1991 Preakness Stakes
- 1991 Belmont Stakes
