= 1991 in sports =

1991 in sports describes the year's events in world sport.

== Alpine skiing ==
- Alpine Skiing World Cup
  - Men's overall season champion: Marc Girardelli, Luxembourg
  - Women's overall season champion: Petra Kronberger, Austria

== American football ==
- Super Bowl XXV – the New York Giants (NFC) won 20–19 over the Buffalo Bills (AFC)
  - Location: Tampa Stadium
  - Attendance: 73,813
  - MVP: Ottis Anderson, RB (New York)
- Thurman Thomas of the Buffalo Bills is named the NFL MVP
- Orange Bowl (1990 season):
  - The Colorado Buffaloes won 10–9 over the Notre Dame Fighting Irish to win the AP Poll national championships
- Desmond Howard, University of Michigan wide receiver seals the Heisman Trophy with a 93-yard punt return in Michigan's 31–3 hammering of Ohio State.
- World Bowl '91: London Monarchs won 21–0 over the Barcelona Dragons in the inaugural World Bowl.
- Quarterback Stan Gelbaugh of the London Monarchs is named the World League of American Football's inaugural seasons Most Valuable Player

== Artistic gymnastics ==
- World Artistic Gymnastics Championships –
  - Men's all-around champion: Grigory Misutin, USSR
  - Women's all-around champion: Kim Zmeskal, United States
  - Men's team competition champion: USSR
  - Women's team competition champion: USSR

== Association football ==
- European Cup – Red Star Belgrade beat Olympique de Marseille 5–3 on penalties (0–0 aet)
- FIFA Women's World Cup – United States won 2–1 over Norway

== Athletics ==
- 1991 World Championships in Athletics held in Tokyo
- 30 August – Track & Field World Championship Mike Powell breaking Bob Beamon's 23-year-old Long Jump world record with a mark of 29' 4 1/2"

== Australian rules football ==
- Australian Football League
  - The Adelaide Crows join the league
  - 25 April – North Melbourne and Sydney kick between them 32.18 (210) in the first half. It is the record aggregate score for a half of VFL/AFL football.
  - 2 June – Carlton kick their first goal with 33 second to go against Footscray, the closest a team has come to finishing goalless since Richmond kicked 0.8 (8) in 1961 against St. Kilda.
  - 8 September – Hawthorn beat West Coast 18.16 (124) to 15.11 (101) in the first final outside Melbourne.
  - 1991 AFL Grand Final (28 September) – Hawthorn wins the 95th AFL premiership beating West Coast 20.19 (139) to 13.8 (86) in the only Grand Final at VFL Park.
  - Brownlow Medal awarded to Jim Stynes (Melbourne)
- 7 October – death of Darren Millane, who played for Collingwood between 1984 and 1991, from a car crash in Prahran.

== Baseball ==
- Dave Righetti breaks Sparky Lyle's major league record for left-handers of 238 career saves.
- 1 May – Nolan Ryan pitchers his seventh career no hitter with a 3–0 victory over the Toronto Blue Jays
- 28 July – Dennis Martínez of the Montreal Expos pitches the 13th perfect game in major league history, beating the Los Angeles Dodgers 2–0.
- World Series – The Minnesota Twins win 4 games to 3 over the Atlanta Braves. The series MVP is Jack Morris of Minnesota.
- Cal Ripken Jr. of the Baltimore Orioles is named AL MVP
- Terry Pendleton of the Atlanta Braves is named NL MVP
- Roger Clemens of the Boston Red Sox is named AL Cy Young award winner. It is his third of six in his career
- Tom Glavine of the Atlanta Braves is named NL Cy Young award winner
- Chuck Knoblauch of the Minnesota Twins is named AL Rookie of the Year
- Jeff Bagwell of the Houston Astros is named NL Rookie of the Year

== Basketball ==
- NCAA Men's Basketball Championship – Duke wins 72–65 over Kansas
- Larry Johnson of UNLV is named Naismith College Player of the Year
- 9 February – Dee Brown win the Gatorade Slam Dunk Contest
- 10 February – NBA All-Star Game is held in Charlotte, North Carolina
- 12 June – NBA Finals: Chicago Bulls win 4 games to 1 over the Los Angeles Lakers to earn the franchise's first championship, starting a run of six titles in eight seasons.
- Michael Jordan is named the NBA MVP, his second of 5 awards.
- 7 November – Lakers' superstar Magic Johnson announces he tested positive for the virus that causes AIDS, thus ending his career in the NBA.
- National Basketball League (Australia) Finals: Perth Wildcats defeated the Eastside Melbourne Spectres 2–1 in the best-of-three final series.
- 17 December – The Cleveland Cavaliers beat the Miami Heat 148 to 80, the largest margin of victory in any NBA game.

== Boxing ==
- 18 March – Mike Tyson defeats Donovan Ruddock in a seventh-round TKO
- 19 April – Evander Holyfield defeats George Foreman to retain WBC, WBA & IBF Heavyweight titles
- 7 to 12 May – 29th European Amateur Boxing Championships held in Gothenburg, Sweden
- 3 June – Thomas Hearns defeats Virgil Hill with a unanimous decision to win WBA Light Heavyweight title
- 1 June at Palm Springs, California – Terry Norris knocked out Donald Curry in the 8th Round to win the WBC Super Welterweight Championship.
- 28 June Mike Tyson defeats Donovan Ruddock in a rematch with a 12-round unanimous decision
- 2 to 18 August – Pan American Games held in Havana, Cuba.
- 5 October – James Toney defeats Michael Nunn with a TKO to win IBF Middleweight title
- James Toney is named Ring Magazine fighter of the year

== Canadian football ==
- Grey Cup – Toronto Argonauts win 36–21 over the Calgary Stampeders
- B.C. Lions Quarterback Doug Flutie is named CFL Most Outstanding Player
- Vanier Cup – Wilfrid Laurier Golden Hawks win 25–18 over the Mount Allison Mounties

== Cricket ==
- South Africa readmitted to the International Cricket Council following the abolition of apartheid, and play their first international game since 1970.

== Cycling ==
- Giro d'Italia won by Franco Chioccioli of Italy
- Tour de France – Miguel Indurain of Spain
- UCI Road World Championships – Men's road race – Gianni Bugno of Italy

== Dogsled racing ==
- Iditarod Trail Sled Dog Race Champion –
  - Rick Swenson won with lead dog: Goose

== Field hockey ==
- Men's Champions Trophy: Germany
- Women's Champions Trophy: Australia

== Figure skating ==
- World Figure Skating Championships –
  - Men's champion: Kurt Browning, Canada
  - Ladies' champion: Kristi Yamaguchi, United States
  - Pair skating champions: Natalia Mishkutenok & Artur Dmitriev, Soviet Union
  - Ice dancing champions: Isabelle Duchesnay & Paul Duchesnay, France

== Golf ==
Men's professional

- Master – Ian Woosnam
- U.S. Open – Payne Stewart
- British Open – Ian Baker-Finch
- PGA Championship – John Daly
- PGA Tour money leader – Corey Pavin – $979,430
- Senior PGA Tour money leader – Mike Hill – $1,065,657
- Ryder Cup – United States team won 14½ – 13½ over the Europe in team golf.

Men's amateur

- British Amateur – Gary Wolstenholme
- U.S. Amateur – Mitch Voges
- European Amateur – Jim Payne
- Tiger Woods, at age 15, won his first USGA title, the U.S. Junior Amateur.

Women's professional

- Nabisco Dinah Shore – Amy Alcott
- LPGA Championship – Meg Mallon
- U.S. Women's Open – Meg Mallon
- Classique du Maurier – Nancy Scranton
- LPGA Tour money leader – Pat Bradley – $763,118

== Harness racing ==
- North America Cup – Precious Bunny
- United States Pacing Triple Crown races –
  1. Cane Pace – Silky Stallone
  2. Little Brown Jug – Precious Bunny
  3. Messenger Stakes – Die Laughing
- United States Trotting Triple Crown races –
  1. Hambletonian – Giant Victory
  2. Yonkers Trot – Crown's Invitation
  3. Kentucky Futurity – Whiteland Janice
- Australian Inter Dominion Harness Racing Championship –
  - Pacers: Mark Ranover
  - Trotters: Fraggle Rock

== Horse racing ==
Steeplechases

- Cheltenham Gold Cup – Garrison Savannah
- Grand National – Seagram

Flat races

- Australia – Melbourne Cup won by Let's Elope
- Canadian Triple Crown Races:
  1. Queen's Plate – Dance Smartly
  2. Prince of Wales Stakes – Dance Smartly
  3. Breeders' Stakes – Dance Smartly
  - Dance Smartly becomes the country's third consecutive Triple Crown winner.
- France – Prix de l'Arc de Triomphe won by Suave Dancer
- Ireland – Irish Derby Stakes won by Generous
- Japan – Japan Cup won by Golden Pheasant
- English Triple Crown Races:
  1. 2,000 Guineas Stakes – Mystiko
  2. The Derby – Generous
  3. St. Leger Stakes – Toulon
- United States Triple Crown Races:
  1. Kentucky Derby – Strike the Gold
  2. Preakness Stakes – Hansel
  3. Belmont Stakes – Hansel
- Breeders' Cup World Thoroughbred Championships:
  1. Breeders' Cup Classic – Black Tie Affair
  2. Breeders' Cup Distaff – Dance Smartly
  3. Breeders' Cup Juvenile – Arazi
  4. Breeders' Cup Juvenile Fillies – Pleasant Stage
  5. Breeders' Cup Mile – Opening Verse
  6. Breeders' Cup Sprint – Sheikh Albadou
  7. Breeders' Cup Turf – Miss Alleged

== Ice hockey ==
- Art Ross Trophy as the NHL's leading scorer during the regular season: Wayne Gretzky, Los Angeles Kings
- Hart Memorial Trophy for the NHL's Most Valuable Player: Brett Hull, St. Louis Blues
- Stanley Cup
  - Pittsburgh Penguins win four games to two over the Minnesota North Stars
- Conn Smythe Trophy – Mario Lemieux, Pittsburgh Penguins
- World Hockey Championship
  - Men's champion: Sweden defeated Canada
  - Junior Men's champion: Canada defeated the USSR
- Sheffield Steelers formed
- San Jose Sharks formed
- Northern Michigan University wins the NCAA Division I title in hockey, 8–7 in the third overtime against Boston University.

== Lacrosse ==
- The Detroit Turbos defeat the Baltimore Thunder to win the Major Indoor Lacrosse League championship

== Radiosport ==
- The Friendship Radiosport Games held in Portland, Oregon, United States was the first international Amateur Radio Direction Finding competition held in the Americas.
- Third European High Speed Telegraphy Championship held in Neerpelt, Belgium.

== Rugby League ==
- 1991 Kangaroo tour of Papua New Guinea
- Penrith Panthers defeat two-time defending premiers Canberra Raiders in the New South Wales Rugby League Grand Final at the Sydney Football Stadium. It is Penrith's first premiership since their admission in 1967.
- Wigan retained their title in the English Rugby League competition, with Oldham, Sheffield Eagles and Rochdale Hornets being relegated. To date this is Rochdale's last appearance in the top flight.

== Rugby Union ==
- 97th Five Nations Championship series is won by England who complete the Grand Slam
- Australia wins the 1991 Rugby World Cup

== Snooker ==
- World Snooker Championship – John Parrott beats Jimmy White 18–11
- World rankings – Stephen Hendry remains world number one for 1991/92

== Swimming ==
- The sixth FINA World Championships, held in Perth, Australia (3 January – 13)
- Eleventh Pan American Games held in Havana, Cuba (12–18 August)
- 20th European LC Championships, held in Athens, Greece (18–25 August)
- Fourth Pan Pacific Championships, held in Edmonton, Alberta, Canada (22–25 August)
- First European Sprint Championships, held in Gelsenkirchen, Germany (6–8 December)
- 13 December – Steve Crocker sets the first official world record in the men's 50m freestyle (short course) in Sheffield, United Kingdom, clocking 25.64.

== Taekwondo ==
- World Championships held in Athens, Greece

== Tennis ==
- 20 June – death of Michael Westphal (26), German player
- Grand Slam in tennis men's results:
  1. Australian Open – Boris Becker
  2. French Open – Jim Courier
  3. Wimbledon championships – Michael Stich
  4. U.S. Open – Stefan Edberg
- Grand Slam in tennis women's results:
  1. Australian Open – Monica Seles
  2. French Open – Monica Seles
  3. Wimbledon championships – Steffi Graf
  4. U.S. Open – Monica Seles
- Davis Cup – France won 3–1 over the United States in world tennis.

== Triathlon ==
- ITU World Championships held in Gold Coast, Queensland
- ITU World Cup (eleven races) started in the United States Virgin Islands and ended in Mexico
- ETU European Championships held in Geneva, Switzerland

== Volleyball ==
Men's competition

- FIVB World League: Italy
- Asia Volleyball Championship: Japan
- Men's European Volleyball Championship: USSR
- Pan American Games: Cuba

Women's competition

- Asia Volleyball Championship: China
- Women's European Volleyball Championship: USSR
- Pan American Games: Cuba

== Water polo ==
- FINA Men's World Water Polo Championship: USA
- FINA Women's World Water Polo Championship: Netherlands

== Multi-sport events ==
- Eleventh Pan American Games held in Havana, Cuba
- Fifth All-Africa Games held in Cairo, Egypt
- Eleventh Mediterranean Games held in Athens, Greece
- Sixteenth Summer Universiade held in Sheffield, United Kingdom
- Fifteenth Winter Universiade held in Sapporo, Japan
- Sixteenth Southeast Asian Games held in Manila, Philippines

== Awards ==
- Associated Press Male Athlete of the Year – Michael Jordan, NBA basketball
- Associated Press Female Athlete of the Year – Monica Seles, Tennis
- Sports Illustrated Sportsman of the Year – Michael Jordan
- James E. Sullivan Award – Olympic Long Jumper Mike Powell
