= Sea Cadet (American horse) =

American-bred Thoroughbred racehorse

- Sire: Bolger
- Grandsire: Damascus
- Dam: Hattab Gal
- Damsire: Al Hattab
- Sex: Stallion
- Foaled: April 13, 1988; Kentucky
- Died: April 9, 1995; Kentucky
- Country: United States
- Color: Bay
- Breeder: Verne H. Winchell & Katalpa Farm
- Owner: V. H. W. Stables Inc.
- Trainer: Ronald L. McAnally
- Record: 29: 10–6–5
- Earnings: $1,807,150

Major wins
- Donn Handicap (1992); Gulfstream Park Handicap (1992); Meadowlands Cup Handicap (1992)

Sea Cadet (April 13, 1988 – April 9, 1995) was an American thoroughbred racehorse. Co-bred and owned by Verne H. Winchell, Sea Cadet was most notably recognized for his unusually short, four-inch tail. Trained by Hall of Fame trainer Ron McAnally, Sea Cadet began racing in 1990 at two, winning the Leland Stanford Stakes and placing in several other races. He continued improving at three in 1991, winning the El Camino Real Derby and San Felipe Stakes before finishing third in the Santa Anita Derby. Sea Cadet later competed in the Kentucky Derby, where he finished eighth, before winning the Listed Longacres Derby by 12 lengths and the Lazaro S. Barrera Handicap by eight lengths. He ended the season with several other stakes placings and established himself as one of California's leading three-year-olds.

In 1992 at four, Sea Cadet established himself as one of the country's leading handicap horses. He opened the season with consecutive G1 victories in the Donn Handicap and Gulfstream Park Handicap, defeating several established competitors, including Kentucky Derby winner Strike the Gold twice. He later finished second behind Best Pal in the Oaklawn Handicap before returning to win the G1 Meadowlands Cup by two lengths. His victory earned him consideration for the Breeders' Cup Classic, but despite his owner's decision to pay a $360,000 supplementary entry fee, Sea Cadet was forced to withdraw three days before the race after suffering an injury in his stall. He later finished second in the Hawthorne Gold Cup. Following a lengthy absence caused by colitis, Sea Cadet returned to racing in 1994 but struggled to regain his previous form. After several disappointing performances, he was retired with career earnings of $1,807,150 and three Grade 1 victories.

In 1995, Sea Cadet entered stud at Payston Stud in Lexington, Kentucky. However, his breeding career was cut short when he fractured his right front cannon bone in a paddock accident on April 9, 1995, and was euthanized. He left behind only a small number of offspring, with at least three daughters later becoming broodmares. He had limited success as a sire overall.

== Background ==
Sea Cadet was a bay stallion with a small white star and most notably, an unusual four-inch stub for a tail. He was bred by Verne H. Winchell and Lonnie Owens of Katalpa Farm. His sire, Bolger, had placed second in the Bing Crosby Handicap, and his dam, Hattab Gal, was also a Winchell-bred horse who won her maiden race but failed to place in her remaining 13 starts.

In 1989, Katalpa Farm consigned him to the Keeneland yearling sale. However, when bidding stalled, Winchell's farm manager, David Fiske, stepped in to buy him back for $2,800. Winchell later said that "There was nothing wrong with the colt's conformation, but nobody liked him because he didn't have a regular tail," describing it as a "bad day" with few live buyers. In 1990, Sea Cadet's connections planned to sell him again as a two-year-old, but trainer Keith Asmussen, who oversaw many of Winchell's horses, convinced them to withdraw before the auction, as Sea Cadet showed Asmussen enough promise to justify keeping him, noting that he "looked pretty good."

“He looks like an ugly duckling, with that tail missing and all. But he’s always trying. He never gives up.”

— Ron McAnally, the trainer of Sea Cadet

Outside of races, Sea Cadet later wore a tail toupee for "hanging around the barn, and smacking pesky flies," according to McAnally. He also believed that the colt's lack of a tail may have helped his balance. "Since he's got no tail, Sea Cadet often swings his head left and right, and wiggles his behind. You know, to shake the flies." McAnally said, "Result is, my horse appears to have exceptional balance and agility, which can help on a crowded race track."

== Racing career ==
=== 1990: two-year-old season ===
Sea Cadet started his racing career on July 22 on July 22 with a second-place finish at Hollywood Park, a result he repeated on August 11 at Del Mar. He then finally broke his maiden there on September 2. Sea Cadet finished fourth in his first allowance race at Santa Anita on October 11 before racing in another allowance at Hollywood Park, where he placed third on November 11 and won on the 24. This victory marked his first race beyond 6 1/2 furlongs, hinting an aptitude for longer distances by winning at 1 1/16 miles. afterwards, he won the Leland Stanford Stakes at Bay Meadows by 6 lengths in 1:34.02 after remaining in the lead from start to finish.

Returning to that same track on December 29 for the $100,000 Grade 3 California Juvenile Stakes, Sea Cadet finished fourth as the local 1-2 favorite. Mizter Interco, the 2-1 favorite at the Santa Anita simulcast, won the race by coming from the far back, with Pes Blanc in second and the pacemaker Gold Crest Express in third. Sea Cadet earned $92,850 overall in his two-year-old season.

=== 1991: three-year-old season ===
Sea Cadet began his three-year-old season with a victory in the 1 1/16-mile Grade 3 El Camino Real Derby at Bay Meadows on January 19, finishing in 1:40.60. After settling just behind the early leaders, Pes Blanc and Gold Crest Express, Sea Cadet moved to the front around the clubhouse turn, with Gold Crest Express and Pes Blanc close behind. Ev For Shir followed in fourth, while General Meeting remained fifth. Along the backstretch, Gold Crest Express challenged Sea Cadet, and the two battled side-by-side while Pes Blanc and Ev For Shir followed. General Meeting began making progress from fifth as the field approached the final turn. Gold Crest Express continued to press Sea Cadet, but began to fade turning for home. General Meeting advanced along the inside before angling out to challenge Sea Cadet in the stretch. Despite General Meeting's strong late run, Sea Cadet fought back, maintained his lead, and held him off to win.

In his next start, Sea Cadet won the 1 1/16-mile San Felipe Stakes at Santa Anita on March 17, ridden by Hall of Fame jockey Chris McCarron. He finished in 1:41.08, earning $124,200 and bringing his career earnings to $382,050. Although Sea Cadet broke slowly after leaning right and striking his hip against the starting stall, costing him about a length and a half, he quickly regained his balance and took the lead within a few strides. Once in front, Sea Cadet settled into an easy pace, with Oregon, Compelling Sound and favored Split Run following behind. Despite the field's efforts to challenge him, Sea Cadet maintained control throughout the race. Scan advanced from sixth to second at the top of the stretch and made a strong late challenge, but Sea Cadet had enough left to hold his lead and win by three lengths.

Before winning the El Camino Real Derby and San Felipe Stakes, there was some uncertainty about Sea Cadet's ability to handle longer distances races. Because Sea Cadet's father, Bolger, had a reputation as a sire of sprinters, Sea Cadet had originally not been nominated to the Triple Crown races the first deadline by his trainer, Ron McAnally. "Breeding is the only thing you can go on when they haven't stretched out," McAnally said. But after Sea Cadet's El Camino Real Derby and San Felipe Stakes performances, Winchell planned on spending $4,500 in late-entry fees to make him eligible for the Kentucky Derby, Preakness and Belmont, with April 8 serving as the deadline. The San Felipe also served as the final major tune-up for the Santa Anita Derby on April 6. Seven previous San Felipe winners had gone on to win the Santa Anita Derby, and three horses prior had completed the San Felipe, Santa Anita Derby, Kentucky Derby triple. With Sea Cadet now established among the leading 3-year-olds in California, it was expected that he would run in the Santa Anita Derby.

On April 6, Sea Cadet entered the Santa Anita Derby, this time ridden by Hall of Fame jockey Eddie Delahoussaye. He was eventually passed by Best Pal and Dinard and finished third. Dinard won by half a length in 1:48.00, just one second off the stakes record set by Lucky Debonair in 1965 and Sham in 1973. The field also included Mane Minister and the M.C. Hammer owned horse, Media Plan. Sea Cadet was involved in the early pace, moving up alongside Mane Minister and battling for the lead through the backstretch. The two remained close together until Sea Cadet moved ahead by a head approaching the far turn. Meanwhile, Best Pal began advancing from behind, while Dinard, who had lost significant ground earlier after being pulled up quickly due to Media Plan's lead change around the clubhouse turn, was beginning to make up ground. Jockey Chris McCarron later said there was no way to know exactly how much ground the incident had cost Dinard, but that it was "plenty."

Sea Cadet carried his lead toward the stretch, with Mane Minister along the inside and Best Pal closing from the outside. However, turning for home, Best Pal moved ahead as Dinard launched a strong late challenge. Sea Cadet began falling back, while Dinard passed Best Pal to secure the victory. Best Pal finished second, two lengths ahead of Sea Cadet in third. Despite the loss, Sea Cadet's performance kept him among California's leading three-year-olds. Delahoussaye praised Sea Cadet's trip.

"I couldn't have asked for a better trip. He ran a good race, but the two best horses beat him,"

— Eddie Delahoussaye, jockey of Sea Cadet for the 1991 Santa Anita Derby

The 1991 Santa Anita Derby also set a record with $13,234,737 in total bets, beating the previous year's record of $12,879,296 and becoming the sixth-highest betting day in the track's history. This huge turnout was driven by 46,415 on track fans, additional Southern California satellite visitors, and commingled pools from Nevada, Minnesota, Alabama, and West Virginia, totaling 60,572 participants. The race itself also set its own record by drawing $2,700,665 in bets, beating the previous high of $2,065,858 set in 1988. On top of that, the event included the race's first ever trifecta bet, which brought in a record $716,209 for the brand new betting option.

==== Kentucky Derby ====
In the Kentucky Derby on May 4, Sea Cadet entered as one of the leading contenders in the field, having established himself with his previous wins and his placing in the Santa Anita Derby. Sea Cadet's groom, Cuba Baz, also decided put on his tail toupee before the race, joking that he did not want Sea Cadet to develop an "inferiority complex." The Kentucky Derby this year was viewed as an open contest where several horses had a strong chance to win. Dinard, who won the Santa Anita Derby and was expected to enter the Kentucky Derby, sustained a foreleg injury to his left leg, taking him out of the race.

Sea Cadet broke sharply in the 15-horse field and quickly took the lead along the inside, with Forty Something and Corporate Report close behind with Fly So Free also near the front. He maintained his position through the first turn and down the backstretch, setting a half-mile pace of 46 2/5 while facing continued pressure from Forty Something. As the field approached the final turn, Strike the Gold, Best Pal and other contenders began advancing, while Sea Cadet continued leading along the inside.

Sea Cadet held his position into the stretch, but the sustained pace had begun to take its toll. As the contenders fanned across the track, Strike the Gold moved into the lead and Best Pal came through along the inside. Sea Cadet began to drop back after leading for most of the race. Strike the Gold drew away in the final stages to win by 1 3/4 lengths, with Best Pal finishing second and Mane Minister third. Strike The Gold's victory made him $1,034,610 overall. Despite an eighth-place finish that halted his Triple Crown campaign, Sea Cadet remained one of the most accomplished Californian 3-year-olds of the season.

After his eighth-place loss in the Kentucky Derby, Sea Cadet went unplaced again in the Jersey Derby at Garden State Park on May 27. He again showed his usual front-running style, taking the lead early and controlling the pace for much of the race. Sea Cadet remained in front into the stretch, but began to tire as the field closed in. Private Man moved into contention while Greek Costume rallied strongly in the final stages. Greek Costume and Subordinated Debt bumped near the top of the stretch, but Greek Costume recovered and won by a neck. Private Man finished third, one length behind the top two, while Sea Cadet faded to fourth, another two lengths back. Greek Costume's victory was his first stakes win of the year and came despite a foul claim by Hall of Fame jockey Julie Krone, who rode Subordinated Debt.

Sea Cadet stopped going unplaced in his next start, the Bel Air Handicap at Hollywood Park on July 13, where he faced a field of 4 older horses. Flying Continental was the high weight at 122 pounds, with the rest of the field carrying between four and ten pounds more than Sea Cadet. Sea Cadet raced prominently early and moved up to stay within contention as the field covered the opening six furlongs in 69 0/5. Twilight Agenda and Timebank battled for the lead while Sea Cadet remained close behind. As the field approached the final turn, Twilight Agenda gradually pulled clear in the stretch and won by three quarters of a length over Timebank. Sea Cadet finished third ahead of Flying Continental.

On August 11, Sea Cadet won the Listed Longacres Derby at Longacres. Sea Cadet was the overwhelming favorite at odds of 2-5 and dominated the field from the latter stages of the race. Sea Cadet was close to the pace early as the field covered the first half-mile in 46 9/10, Time to Pass pressed the early leaders while Major Howey and Ice in Space remained within striking distance. Sea Cadet continued to advance as the field moved fast and took control approaching the final turn. Once in front, Sea Cadet drew steadily away from his rivals. He turned the final quarter-mile in 19 seconds and finished strongly to win by 12 lengths. Major Howey was second, with Ice in Space third, while Time to Pass faded to fourth after pressing the pace. Sea Cadet finished the 1 1/8 miles in 1:55.30.

The following month on September 20, Sea Cadet entered the Pegasus Handicap, where he faced seven other 3 year olds. Sea Cadet raced alongside Scan through much of the race as the pair set a demanding pace. The two remained locked together as they entered the stretch, with Sea Cadet continuing to fight for the lead while Sultry Song and the rest of the field struggled to keep pace. Scan gained the advantage in the final stages and drove clear to win by 1 3/4 lengths, setting a new track record of 1:46.53. Sea Cadet placed second, finishing a length and three quarters behind Scan and well clear of Sultry Song in third place, while Valley Crossing, King Mutesa and the rest of the field were unable to threaten the top two throughout.

Sea Cadet faced Scan again in the Meadowlands Cup Handicap on October 18. He raced prominently throughout the early stages while Twilight Agenda and Scan fought for the lead. As the leaders turned for home, Sea Cadet remained within striking distance and launched his bid behind Twilight Agenda and Scan. The three horses separated themselves from the remainder of the field and battled down the stretch, with Sea Cadet fighting on strongly as the top pair pulled slightly ahead. Twilight Agenda ultimately beat Scan by a head, while Sea Cadet finished another 1 1/2 lengths behind Scan in third, De Roche closed late to finish fourth, only a short distance behind Sea Cadet.

On November 24, Sea Cadet returned to California for the Lazaro S. Barrera Handicap at Hollywood Park, which had been renamed earlier that year in honor of Hall of Fame trainer Lazaro Sosa Barrera. He was the overwhelming favorite at odds of 1–2. Sea Cadet settled in fourth during the early stages as Zig n' Zag took the lead and set the pace through the opening furlongs, with What A Spell close behind. Sea Cadet remained close behind the leaders while the field entered the middle stages of the race. Later in the race, Sea Cadet began advancing steadily and took the lead before entering the final turn. Once in front, Sea Cadet quickly separated himself from the field and powered through the stretch. Sea Cadet finished the race in 1:42.30 and won by eight lengths. Multiengine, who had been near the back of the field for most of the race, closed from the back of the field to finish second by a nose over What a Spell.

=== 1992: four-year-old season ===
Sea Cadet began his four-year-old season on January 11 in the William P. Kyne Handicap at Bay Meadows. After his previous eight-length victory in the Barrera Handicap last year, Sea Cadet entered the Kyne Handicap as the overwhelming favorite, sent off at 1-5 odds in the Santa Anita simulcast. Sea Cadet settled behind the early leaders and remained within striking distance as Charts, the longest shot in the field, took the lead. Entering the stretch, Charts began to weaken after setting the pace, allowing Admirallus to launch his challenge. Admirallus gradually closed the gap and caught Charts in the final strides, finishing by a head. Charts finished seven lengths ahead of Sea Cadet, who faded badly in the final stages and had to settle for third.

==== Donn Handicap ====
Afterwards on February 1, Sea Cadet competed in the Donn Handicap at Gulfstream Park under jockey Alex Solis, who would ride him throughout the rest of the season. The race was the first leg of the American Championship Racing Series, a recent nine-race series for older thoroughbreds. Sea Cadet was the 5-2 favorite, with 1991 Kentucky Derby winner Strike the Gold, who he raced against two years before, among his main competitors. Fly So Free was also expected to be one of the contenders, however, he was scratched the day before the race after developing a fever caused by a bacterial infection.

Sea Cadet broke sharply and settled into second behind Sunny Sunrise, remaining close to the leader through the first turn and down the backstretch. Approaching the far turn, Native Boundary joined the two leaders, and the three entered the stretch nearly together. Sea Cadet then surged between his rivals, quickly taking control and pulling away by 1 1/2 lengths at the eighth pole and kept drawing away to win by three lengths. The longshot runner Out of Place finished second, followed by Sunny Sunrise in third, while Strike the Gold finished sixth ahead of Peanut Butter Onit and Sports View. Sea Cadet earned $300,000 for the victory, bringing his career earnings to $1,087,650 and marking his first Grade 1 win. Earlier that day, his trainer, Ron McAnally, received his second Eclipse Award for Outstanding Trainer. Because McAnally was attending the ceremony in Nevada, longtime assistant Eduardo Inda supervised Sea Cadet at Gulfstream. McAnally had sent Sea Cadet to Florida to keep him separate from stablemate Olympio, who remained in California for the Strub Series.

McAnally eventually watched the race from the Las Vegas Hilton's racebook and compared the day to his previous Eclipse Award victory in 1982. "I won the award, and the next day I flew to San Francisco and saddled Cassaleria to win the El Camino Real Derby," he recalled. "He had one eye and we won that race; Sea Cadet has no tail and we won this race."

==== Gulfstream Park Handicap ====
On March 7, Sea Cadet entered the Gulfstream Park Handicap for his second Grade 1 start of the season, once again facing Strike the Gold and Sunny Sunrise. Sea Cadet broke well and settled into second behind Sunny Sunrise, while Strike the Gold remained near the back of the field. Jockey Alex Solis initially intended to keep Sea Cadet close behind the leader without pushing him too early, explaining, "I wanted the other horse on the lead. I tried to stay close without pressing him so the pace wouldn't be too fast." Approaching the final turn, however, Sea Cadet began advancing earlier than Solis had planned. "I hadn't planned to move on the far turn, but he wanted to go, so I let him," Solis said. Sea Cadet moved past Sunny Sunrise, took a one-length lead, and continued pulling away around the turn. Strike the Gold began making up ground in the stretch, but Sea Cadet maintained his advantage. Solis asked him for another effort, and Sea Cadet drew further ahead, eventually winning by seven lengths in 2:01.79. Strike the Gold finished second, 2 1/2 lengths ahead of Sunny Sunrise in third.

"No excuses. He put in his run, and made a good move. But Sea Cadet ran a very strong race, and we weren't able to beat him."

— Strike the Gold's trainer Nick Zito on Sea Cadet

The victory marked Sea Cadet's second consecutive Grade 1 win and win over Strike the Gold, who had now lost eleven straight races since his Kentucky Derby victory. Despite the defeat, Strike the Gold produced a much stronger performance in the Gulfstream Park. His jockey, Julie Krone, praised his effort, saying, "I don't think it's any shame at all, losing to a horse who ran a real big race like that." She also noted that he "closed real strong, like his old self." Strike the Gold's trainer Nick Zito similarly acknowledged Sea Cadet's performance.

On April 11, Sea Cadet competed in the Oaklawn Handicap at Oaklawn Park in Hot Springs, Arkansas. The race marked his first meeting of the season with runners Twilight Agenda, along with Best Pal, who were tied for the lead in the American Championship Racing Series. Best Pal entered as the heavy favorite despite ongoing hoof problems, including a damaged quarter crack in his left rear hoof and a recent issue involving a piece of gravel lodged in his right front hoof. Sea Cadet, meanwhile, entered the race after his two Grade 1 victories and faced a strong seven-horse field which also included Sunny Sunrise.

During the 1 1/8 mile race, Twilight Agenda and Total Assets disputed the early lead while Sea Cadet settled behind the front-runners. Best Pal raced toward the middle of the field, staying wide to avoid dirt being kicked into his face. Approaching the final turn, Best Pal moved around the leaders and advanced four wide, while Sea Cadet also began making his move in the stretch. Best Pal pulled away to win by 1 1/2 lengths in 1:48.10, earning his first victory outside California despite his hoof troubles. Sea Cadet finished second, half a length ahead of Twilight Agenda in third. The victory marked Best Pal's fourth consecutive win, and gave him the lead in the American Championship Racing Series after three races, however Sea Cadet still remained a leading contender in the series.

Following the Oaklawn Handicap, Sea Cadet developed fluid built up in his right ankle, forcing him to take some time off racing. And after a six-month break, he returned to racing on October 16 to win the 1992 Meadowlands Cup Handicap at the Meadowlands Sports Complex, which he placed 3rd in the previous year. The race served as one of the final major preparations for the Breeders' Cup Classic, scheduled for October 31 at Gulfstream Park. Sea Cadet entered as part of a McAnally trained entry alongside Silver Ending, while Jolie's Halo was the 9-5 favorite despite a difficult season that included a stumble at the start of the Pacific Classic. His trainer was looking to regain his form and earn a place in the upcoming Classic. Sea Cadet broke well and settled into third behind Agincourt and Jolie's Halo, racing wide around the first turn. The three horses maintained their positions near the front through the backstretch until Sea Cadet moved ahead approaching the far turn. As Agincourt began fading, Sea Cadet took the lead while Jolie's Halo struggled to keep pace. Valley Crossing, the longshot who had stumbled slightly at the start, made a strong late move from the back of the field and advanced into second. However, Sea Cadet maintained his advantage and held off Valley Crossing to win by two lengths in 1:48.00. American Chance finished third, while Jolie's Halo faded to ninth.

Sea Cadet earned $300,000, bringing his career earnings above $1.7 million. His victory also put him firmly in consideration for the upcoming Breeders' Cup Classic, although he had not originally been nominated for the race. Winchell ultimately decided to pay the $360,000 supplementary entry fee to enter him against leading competitors such as A.P. Indy and Pleasant Tap. Although McAnally acknowledged the considerable expense, Sea Cadet's previous success' at Gulfstream, including a victory at the Classic's 1 1/4-mile distance, helped support the decision. However, three days before the Breeders’ Cup, Sea Cadet injured his hind leg after kicking at flies and slamming it against the back wall of his stall on a hot, humid morning at Gulfstream. The injury forced him to withdraw, costing Winchell a non-refundable $120,000, the first installment of a $360,000 fee. While A.P Indy went on to win the Breeders' Cup Classic and be named Horse of the Year.

After recovering, Sea Cadet entered the Grade 2 Budweiser-Hawthorne Gold Cup at Hawthorne Race Course on November 21, 1992, run at 1 1/4 miles. The race was the final major graded stakes event of the Chicago racing season. Sea Cadet entered as the 3-5 favorite, and the field also Twilight Agenda, who was making the final start of his career. Sea Cadet helped establish the early pace alongside Twilight Agenda, with the two remaining near the front through the first mile. Irish Swap tracked the leaders before making his move in the stretch, passing Sea Cadet and pulling away to win by four lengths in 2:01.12 over a good track. Sea Cadet finished second after weakening late, while Twilight Agenda faded to fifth. Irish Swap's victory marked his sixth win in nine starts that year, earning him $240,000.

While training for his next start at Santa Anita, Sea Cadet was struck by colitis, a severe, often fatal intestinal disorder. He spent the next two months recovering at a hospital in Chino before finally being released around May 1994. "We were lucky," trainer McAnally said. "If you don’t catch colitis early, it can be fatal. Even so, we still almost lost him."

=== 1994: six-year-old season ===
On July 17, 1994, Sea Cadet made his first start of the season once again racing in the Bel Air Handicap at Hollywood Park following his recovery from colitis, ridden by Alex Solis. Sea Cadet's return came after Winchell decided against retiring him, believing his recent workouts suggested he could regain his previous form. Winchell praised the care Sea Cadet received during his recovery and expressed hope that he could continue racing for another season.

"They did a fine job at Chino to save him. We're not ready to make a stallion out of him yet, I’ve got enough stallions at my farm these days. I'd like to think that he could run another year after this one."

— Verne H. Winchell, owner and co-breeder of Sea Cadet

However, Sea Cadet struggled in his comeback, finishing fifth and last in the five-horse field. Despite being among the favorites and carrying 121 pounds, he was unable to maintain his early pace and ultimately faded in the later race. Region won the race, followed by Tinners Way and Williamstown.

Sea Cadet made his next two starts in the listed Windy Sands Handicap at Del Mar on August 19 and the listed Skywalker Handicap at Santa Anita Park on November 3. He struggled again in the Windy Sands Handicap, finishing last in the field. However, he showed improvement in his following start, finishing second behind Stuka in the 1 1/16-mile Skywalker Handicap. Afterwards Sea Cadet made his next start in the Native Diver Handicap, run over 1 1/8 miles at Hollywood Park, facing Best Pal once more. In the race Sea Cadet struggled to keep pace and finished fourth, beaten by 10 lengths as Best Pal won by four lengths. In his following start, racing in the William P. Kyne Handicap at Bay Meadows for a second time, Sea Cadet would finish last again in the five-horse field behind winner Nancys French Fry, who won by 14 lengths over a sloppy track. Following these performances, Sea Cadet retired from racing with career earnings of $1,807,150 and three Grade 1 victories.

== Stud record ==
On January 6, 1995, Sea Cadet was sent to stand stud at Payston Stud in Lexington, Kentucky. However, his time at stud was later cut short when he fractured his right front cannon bone in a paddock accident on April 9, 1995, and was euthanized just four days before his seventh birthday.

As a result of his brief stud career, Sea Cadet left behind only a small number of offspring, born in 1996. At least three of his daughters went on to become broodmares, making him the broodmare sire of at least 16 named foals of racing age, eight of whom became winners. However, none of his descendants achieved comparable success. Sea Cadet ultimately had a little impact as a sire and a broodmare sire.

== Pedigree ==
Pedigree of Sea Cadet (USA), bay stallion, foaled 1988
Sire Bolger (USA) 1976	Damascus (USA) 1964	Sword Dancer	Sunglow
Sire Bolger (USA) 1976	Damascus (USA) 1964	Sword Dancer	Highland Fling
Sire Bolger (USA) 1976	Damascus (USA) 1964	Kerala	My Babu
Sire Bolger (USA) 1976	Damascus (USA) 1964	Kerala	Blade of Time
Sire Bolger (USA) 1976	Dancealot (USA) 1971	Round Table	Princequillo
Sire Bolger (USA) 1976	Dancealot (USA) 1971	Round Table	Knight's Daughter
Sire Bolger (USA) 1976	Dancealot (USA) 1971	Music Please	To Market
Sire Bolger (USA) 1976	Dancealot (USA) 1971	Music Please	Santorin
Dam Hattab Gal (USA) 1981	Al Hattab (USA) 1966	The Axe II	Mahmoud
Dam Hattab Gal (USA) 1981	Al Hattab (USA) 1966	The Axe II	Blackball
Dam Hattab Gal (USA) 1981	Al Hattab (USA) 1966	Abyssinia	Abernant
Dam Hattab Gal (USA) 1981	Al Hattab (USA) 1966	Abyssinia	Serengeti
Dam Hattab Gal (USA) 1981	Forest Princess (USA) 1973	Fleet Nasrullah	Nasrullah
Dam Hattab Gal (USA) 1981	Forest Princess (USA) 1973	Fleet Nasrullah	Happy Go Fleet
Dam Hattab Gal (USA) 1981	Forest Princess (USA) 1973	Queen Hostess	My Host
Dam Hattab Gal (USA) 1981	Forest Princess (USA) 1973	Queen Hostess	Donut Queen
