= 1991 Belmont Stakes =

American horse race

123rd Belmont Stakes
- Belmont Stakes
- Grade I stakes race
- Location: Belmont Park; Elmont, New York, U.S.
- Date: June 8, 1991
- Winning horse: Hansel
- Winning time: 2:28.10
- Final odds: 4.10 (to 1)
- Jockey: Jerry Bailey
- Trainer: Frank L. Brothers
- Owner: Lazy Lane Farm, Inc.
- Conditions: Fast
- Surface: Dirt
- Attendance: 51,766

The 1991 Belmont Stakes was the 123rd running of the Belmont Stakes at Belmont Park in Elmont, New York held on June 8, 1991. With a field of eleven horses, Hansel won by a head over 1991 Kentucky Derby winner Strike the Gold in front of a crowd of over 51,000 spectators. While the Triple Crown was not up for grabs due to Strike the Gold's loss at the 1991 Preakness Stakes, four horses were eligible for the $1,000,000 Triple Crown Challenge

== The Road to the 1991 Belmont Stakes ==
Hansel had won the March 1991 Grade-2 Jim Beam Stakes and the April 1991 Grade-2 Lexington Stakes. In the 1991 Kentucky Derby, he placed a disappointing 10th place, finishing 10 lengths behind winner, Strike the Gold. Due to his poor showing, his owners considered not even running him in the 1991 Preakness Stakes. His owners gamble worked out as on May 18, 1991, when he captured the 1991 Preakness Stakes by 7 lengths over Corporate Report.

Strike the Gold had won the April 1991 Blue Grass Stakes defeating favorite Fly So Free by a half-length after finishing 2nd to Fly So Free at the 1991 Florida Derby. He captured the 1991 Kentucky Derby, but finished a disappointing 6th place at the 1991 Preakness Stakes.

Mane Minister had only won smaller listed stakes races but was able to place on the podium at the 1991 Kentucky Derby and the 1991 Preakness Stakes.

Corporate Report had only won an allowance race but had a surprise second-place finish at the 1991 Preakness Stakes.

Scan had multiple podium finishes in Grade-2 and Grade-3 races but hadn't won a race otherwise since the November 1990 Remsen Stakes.

Quintana came in 6th at the 1991 Kentucky Derby but opted for the May 1991 Grade-3 Peter Pan Stakes over the Preakness and finished in 4th.

Lost Mountain, after having not won any stakes races, got the upset win at the 1991 Peter Pan Stakes over Quintana and decided to compete.

Subordinated Debt had finished on the podium multiple times in graded races and won the May 8th, 1991, Withers Stakes.

Green Alligator won the Grade-3 April 1991 California Derby and finished 4th at the 1991 Kentucky Derby.

Smooth Performance and Another Review had not won any graded races.

Best Pal was speculated to run but was pulled due to exhaustion.

== Results ==
Finish	Post Position	Program Number	Horse	Jockey	Trainer	Owner	Final Odds (to 1)	Stakes
1	5	5	Hansel	Jerry Bailey	Frank L. Brothers	Lazy Lane Farm, Inc.	4	$1,417,480
2	11	11	Strike the Gold	Chris Antley	Nicholas Zito	B C C Gold Stable	2	$153,076
3	3	3	Mane Minister	J. Paco Gonzalez	Alex Solis	John A. Toffan	17	$83,496
4	6	6	Corporate Report	Pat Day	D. Wayne Lukas	William T. Young	8	$41,748
5	2	2	Scan	Chris McCarron	Flint Schulhofer	William Haggin Perry	10	$21,630
6	7	7	Quintana	Angel Cordero Jr.	David C. Cross Jr.	Gary M. Garber	26	
7	4	4	Lost Mountain	Craig Perret	Thomas Bohannan	Loblolly Stable	19	
8	10	10	Smooth Performance	Michael Kinane	Dermot Weld	Moyglare Stud Farm	7	
9	9	9	Subordinated Debt	Julie Krone	David Monaci	Leslie R. Grimm	21	
10	8	8	Green Alligator	Corey Nakatani	Murray Johnson	Anderson Fowler	4	
11	1	1	Another Review	Richard Migliore	John Campo	Buckland Farm	99	

Times: 1/4 mile: :23.04, 1/2 mile: :46.79, 3/4mile: 1:11.75, 1 mile: 1:36.69, Final: 2:28.10

=== Payout schedule ===
Program	Horse	Win	Place	Show
1	Hansel	$10.20	$6.40	$5
2	Strike the Gold	–	$5	$4
5	Mane Minister	–	–	$4.40

== See also ==
- 1991 Kentucky Derby
- 1991 Preakness Stakes
