= 1981 in sports =

1981 in sports describes the year's events in world sport.

== Alpine skiing ==
- Alpine Skiing World Cup –
  - Men's overall season champion: Phil Mahre, USA
  - Women's overall season champion: Marie-Theres Nadig, Switzerland

== American football ==
- January 25 – Super Bowl XV: the Oakland Raiders (AFC) won 27−10 over the Philadelphia Eagles (NFC)
  - Location: Superdome
  - Attendance: 76,135
  - MVP: Jim Plunkett, QB (Oakland)
- Sugar Bowl (1980 season):
  - The Georgia Bulldogs won 17-10 over the Notre Dame Fighting Irish to win the college football national championship
- October 11 - LeRoy Irvin sets NFL record for most punt return yards in a game (207).

== Artistic gymnastics ==
- World Artistic Gymnastics Championships –
  - Men's all-around champion: Yuri Korolev, USSR
  - Women's all-around champion: Olga Bicherova, USSR
  - Men's team competition champion: USSR
  - Women's team competition champion: USSR

== Association football ==
- UEFA Champions League – Liverpool FC 1-0 Real Madrid
- UEFA Cup – two leg final: 1st leg Ipswich Town F.C. 3-0 AZ '67 (Alkmaar); 2nd leg AZ '67 4-2 Ipswich Town. Ipswich Town win 5-4 on aggregate
- Cup Winners' Cup – Dynamo Tbilisi 2-1 Carl Zeiss Jena
- Copa Libertadores de América – Flamengo 2-0 Cobreloa
- World Club Championship – Flamengo 3-0 Liverpool FC
- Aston Villa win English League Championship
- FA Cup – Tottenham Hotspur win 3-2 over Manchester City

== Australian rules football ==
- Victorian Football League
  - May 23 – A protest by Richmond against the eligibility of defender Doug Cox to play for St. Kilda led to the Saints temporarily losing the points for their first two wins. They were reinstated later due to changes in the relevant rules, but a fine of $5000 remained.
  - June 6 – Richmond’s Kevin Bartlett became the first to play 350 VFL games.
  - Carlton win the 85th VFL Premiership, beating Collingwood 12.20 (92) to 10.12 (72)
  - Brownlow Medal awarded to Barry Round (South Melbourne) and Bernie Quinlan (Fitzroy)
  - At the end of the season, South Melbourne relocate to Sydney and are renamed the Sydney Swans.

== Baseball ==
- For a Venezuelans baseball player's strike the Caribbean World Series of this year is cancelled.
- January 15 - In his first year of eligibility, former Cardinals pitcher Bob Gibson is the only player elected to the Baseball Hall of Fame. Gibson won 20 games five times, struck out 3,117 batters, and captured the Cy Young Award and MVP in 1968 with a 1.12 ERA. Players falling short of the 301 votes needed for election include Don Drysdale (243), Gil Hodges (241), Harmon Killebrew (239), Hoyt Wilhelm (238), and Juan Marichal (233). All except Hodges would subsequently gain election.
- April 18 - An International League game between the Pawtucket Red Sox and the visiting Rochester Red Wings set the record for the most innings ever played in a single professional baseball game, at 33 innings (24 extra innings). The game was suspended after 32 innings on the morning of April 19, and was concluded on June 23 with a 3-2 Pawtucket victory.
- June 12 - Major League Baseball players begin a 49-day strike over the issue of free-agent compensation.
- World Series – Los Angeles Dodgers win 4 games to 2 over the New York Yankees. The Series MVP is a tie between Ron Cey, Pedro Guerrero and Steve Yeager, Los Angeles

== Basketball ==
- NCAA Men's Division I Basketball Championship –
  - Indiana wins 63-50 over North Carolina
- NBA Finals –
  - Boston Celtics won 4 games to 2 over the Houston Rockets
- National Basketball League (Australia) Finals:
  - Launceston Casino City defeated the Nunawading Spectres 75-54 in the final.

== Boxing ==
- April 11 – Larry Holmes defeats Trevor Berbick by a unanimous decision to retain the WBC heavyweight title.
- August 21 – Salvador Sánchez defeats Wilfredo Gómez by knockout in round eight to retain boxing's WBC world Featherweight title.(see: The Battle of the Little Giants)
- September 16 – Sugar Ray Leonard defeats Thomas Hearns by knockout in round 14 to unify boxing's world Welterweight title.
- October 3 – Mike Weaver defeats James (Quick) Tillis by a unanimous decision to retain the WBA heavyweight title. Marvin Hagler defeats Mustafa Hamsho by eleventh-round technical knockout to retain his undisputed world Middleweight title as Weaver-Tillis' show's main event.

== Canadian football ==
- Grey Cup – Edmonton Eskimos win 26–23 over the Ottawa Rough Riders
- Vanier Cup – Acadia Axemen win 18–12 over the Alberta Golden Bears

== Cycling ==
- Giro d'Italia won by Giovanni Battaglin of Italy
- Tour de France won by Bernard Hinault of France

== Dogsled racing ==
- Iditarod Trail Sled Dog Race Champion –
  - Rick Swenson won with lead dogs: Andy & Slick

== Field hockey ==
- Men's Champions Trophy held in Karachi won by the Netherlands
- Women's World Cup held in Buenos Aires won by West Germany

== Figure skating ==
- World Figure Skating Championship –
  - Men's champion: Scott Hamilton, United States
  - Ladies' champion: Denise Biellmann, Switzerland
  - Pair skating champions: Irina Vorobeva & Igor Lisovski, Soviet Union
  - Ice dancing champions: Jayne Torvill & Christopher Dean, Great Britain

== Gaelic Athletic Association ==
- Camogie
  - All-Ireland Camogie Champion: Kilkenny
  - National Camogie League: Dublin
- Gaelic football
  - All-Ireland Senior Football Championship – Kerry 1-12 died Offaly 0-8
  - National Football League – Galway 1-11 died Roscommon 1-3
- Ladies' Gaelic football
  - All-Ireland Senior Football Champion: Kerry 1-12 died Offaly 0-8
  - National Football League: Galway 1-11 died Roscommon 1-3
- Hurling
  - All-Ireland Senior Hurling Championship – Offaly 2-12 died Galway 0-15
  - National Hurling League – Cork 3-11 died Offaly 2-8

== Golf ==
Men's professional

- Masters Tournament - Tom Watson
- U.S. Open - David Graham
- British Open - Bill Rogers
- PGA Championship - Larry Nelson
- PGA Tour money leader - Tom Kite - $375,699
- Senior PGA Tour money leader - Miller Barber - $83,136
- Ryder Cup - United States win 18½ to 9½ over Europe in team golf.

Men's amateur

- British Amateur - Philippe Ploujoux
- U.S. Amateur - Nathaniel Crosby

Women's professional

- LPGA Championship - Donna Caponi
- U.S. Women's Open - Pat Bradley
- Classique Peter Jackson Classic - Jan Stephenson
- LPGA Tour money leader - Beth Daniel - $206,998

== Harness racing ==
- United States Pacing Triple Crown races –
  1. Cane Pace - Wildwood Jeb
  2. Little Brown Jug - Fan Hanover (Filly)
  3. Messenger Stakes - Seahawk Hanover
- United States Trotting Triple Crown races –
  1. Hambletonian - Shiaway St. Pat
  2. Yonkers Trot - Mo Bandy
  3. Kentucky Futurity - Filet of Sole
- Australian Inter Dominion Harness Racing Championship –
  - Pacers: San Simeon

== Horse racing ==
- August 30 – John Henry becomes the first horse to win a million dollar race, the inaugural Arlington Million, at Arlington Park in the Chicago suburb of Arlington Heights, Illinois.
- November – inaugural running of the Japan Cup, the most prestigious horse race in Japan, at Tokyo Racecourse in Fuchu, Tokyo. Its distance is about 1½ miles on turf and it is the world's richest turf race.

Steeplechases

- Cheltenham Gold Cup – Little Owl
- Grand National – Aldaniti

Flat races

- Australia – Melbourne Cup won by Just A Dash
- Canada – Queen's Plate won by Fiddle Dancer Boy
- France – 1981 Prix de l'Arc de Triomphe won by Gold River
- Ireland – Irish Derby Stakes won by Shergar
- Japan – Japan Cup won by Mairzy Doates
- English Triple Crown Races:
  1. 2,000 Guineas Stakes – To-Agori-Mou
  2. The Derby – Shergar
  3. St. Leger Stakes – Cut Above
- United States Triple Crown Races:
  1. Kentucky Derby – Pleasant Colony
  2. Preakness Stakes – Pleasant Colony
  3. Belmont Stakes – Summing

Quarter Horse Racing

- Triple Crown of Quarter Horse Racing
- Special Effort

== Ice hockey ==
- May 10 - Cornwall Royals defeat the Kitchener Rangers to win the 1981 Memorial Cup
- May 21 - New York Islanders defeat the Minnesota North Stars to win the 1981 Stanley Cup
- Ice Hockey World Championships:
  - Men's champion: Soviet Union defeated Sweden
  - Junior Men's champion: Sweden defeated Finland
- August 27 – death of Valeri Kharlamov (33), Russian player, in a car crash

== Rugby league ==
- 1981 European Rugby League Championship
- 1981 New Zealand rugby league season
- 1981 NSWRFL season
  - 1981 Craven Mild Cup
  - 1981 Tooth Cup
- 1980–81 Rugby Football League season/1981–82 Rugby Football League season
- 1981 State of Origin game

== Rugby union ==
- 87th Five Nations Championship series is won by France who complete the Grand Slam
- The 1981 Springbok Tour causes major controversy and riots in New Zealand

== Snooker ==
- World Snooker Championship – Steve Davis beats Doug Mountjoy 18-12
- World rankings – Cliff Thorburn becomes world number one for 1981/82

== Swimming ==
- August 15 – USA's Robin Leamy of UCLA sets a world record time of 22.54 in the 50m freestyle (long course) at Brown Deer, Wisconsin, shaving 0.17 off the previous record (22.71) set by Joseph Bottom exactly one year ago in Honolulu, Hawaii

== Tennis ==
- Grand Slam in tennis men's results:
  1. Australian Open - Johan Kriek
  2. French Open - Björn Borg
  3. Wimbledon championships - John McEnroe
  4. U.S. Open - John McEnroe
- Grand Slam in tennis women's results:
  1. Australian Open - Martina Navratilova
  2. French Open - Hana Mandlíková
  3. Wimbledon championships - Chris Evert
  4. U.S. Open - Tracy Austin
- Davis Cup – United States wins 3-1 over Argentina in world tennis.

== Volleyball ==
- Men and Women's European Volleyball Championships held in Bulgaria and won by USSR (men) and Bulgaria (women)

== Water polo ==
- 1981 FINA Men's Water Polo World Cup in Long Beach, California won by USSR
- 1981 FINA Women's Water Polo World Cup in Brisbane, Australia won by Canada

== Multi-sport events ==
- First World Games held in Santa Clara, United States
- Eleventh Summer Universiade held in Bucharest, Romania
- Tenth Winter Universiade held in Jaca, Spain

== Awards ==
- Associated Press Male Athlete of the Year – John McEnroe, Tennis
- Associated Press Female Athlete of the Year – Tracy Austin, Tennis
- Sports Illustrated Sportsman of the Year - Sugar Ray Leonard, Boxing
