= 1981 Kentucky Derby =

Horse race

107th Kentucky Derby
- Kentucky Derby
- Grade I stakes race
- Location: Churchill Downs
- Date: May 2, 1981
- Winning horse: Pleasant Colony
- Jockey: Jorge Velásquez
- Trainer: John P. Campo
- Owner: Buckland Farm
- Conditions: Fast
- Surface: Dirt
- Attendance: 139,195

The 1981 Kentucky Derby was the 107th running of the Kentucky Derby. The race took place on May 2, 1981, with 139,195 people in attendance.

== Full results ==
Finished	Post	Horse	Jockey	Trainer	Owner	Time / behind
1st	4	Pleasant Colony	Jorge Velásquez	John P. Campo	Buckland Farm	2:02.00
2nd	6	Woodchopper	Eddie Delahoussaye	John M. Gaver Jr.	Greentree Stable	
3rd	12	Partez	Sandy Hawley	D. Wayne Lukas	Elizabeth Davis / Mr. & Mrs. Henry Greene	
4th	16	Classic Go Go	Anthony S. Black	Jerry C. Meyer	Verne Winchell	
5th	19	Television Studio	David Whited	Anthony L. Basile	Bwamazon Farm	
6th	5	Pass the Tab	Laffit Pincay Jr.	Albert S. Barrera	Leopoldo Villareal	
7th	3	Splendid Spruce	Darrel McHargue	Chay R. Knight	Surf and Turf Stable	
8th	11	Flying Nashua	Angel Cordero Jr.	Larry Barrera	Dr. Ulf Kirkegaard-Jensen	
9th	2	Noble Nashua	Cash Asmussen	Jose A. Martin	Flying Zee Stable	
10th	8	Bold Ego	John L. Lively	Jack Van Berg	Double B Ranch & Kidd	
11th	13	Double Sonic	Buck Thornburg	George Krnjaich	Elias Brothers	
12th	15	Hoedown's Day	Thomas Chapman	Roger Dominquez	Mr. & Mrs. Roger Dominguez & Marie Freidel	
13th	18	Beau Rit	Phil Rubbicco	Louie J. Roussel III	Carole Roussel	
14th	10	Tap Shoes	Ruben Hernandez	Horatio Luro	Leone J. Peters & Arthur B. Hancock III	
15th	9	Cure the Blues	Bill Shoemaker	LeRoy Jolley	Bert Firestone	
16th	7	Well Decorated	Don MacBeth	Eugene Jacobs	Herbert A. Allen Sr.	
17th	20	Mythical Ruler	Kevin Wirth	Fred Wirth	Albert Risen	
18th	1A	Proud Appeal	Jeffrey Fell	Stanley M. Hough	M. H. Winfield & S. M.Hough	
19th	17	Top Avenger	Larry Snyder	Dwight Viator	W. P. "Buster" Bishop	
20th	14	Habano	Bennie R. Feliciano	Francisco Gonzalez	Marco Coello	
21st	1	Golden Derby	Julio C. Espinoza	Smiley Adams	Frederick N. Lehmann & John R. Gaines	

- Winning Breeder: Thomas Mellon Evans; (VA)
