= 1981 Preakness Stakes =

106th running of the Preakness Stakes

106th Preakness Stakes
- The Preakness Stakes
- Location: Pimlico Race Course, Baltimore, Maryland, United States
- Date: May 16, 1981
- Winning horse: Pleasant Colony
- Jockey: Jorge Velásquez
- Conditions: Fast
- Surface: Dirt

The 1981 Preakness Stakes was the 106th running of the $275,000 Grade 1 Preakness Stakes thoroughbred horse race. The race took place on May 16, 1981, and was televised in the United States on the ABC television network. Pleasant Colony, who was jockeyed by Jorge Velásquez, won the race by one length over runner-up Bold Ego. Approximate post time was 5:41 p.m. Eastern Time. The race was run on a fast track in a final time of 1:54-3/5. The Maryland Jockey Club reported total attendance of 84,133, this is recorded as second highest on the list of American thoroughbred racing top attended events for North America in 1981.

== Payout ==
The 106th Preakness Stakes Payout Schedule

| Program Number | Horse Name | Win | Place | Show |
|---|---|---|---|---|
| 11 | Pleasant Colony | US$5.00 | $3.40 | $3.20 |
| 6 | Bold Ego | - | $4.60 | $4.20 |
| 2 | Paristo | - | - | $17.80 |

$2 Exacta: (11–6) paid $25.00

== The full chart ==
| Finish Position | Margin (lengths) | Post Position | Horse name | Jockey | Trainer | Owner | Post Time Odds | Purse Earnings |
|---|---|---|---|---|---|---|---|---|
| 1st | 0 | 11 | Pleasant Colony | Jorge Velásquez | John P. Campo | Buckland Farm | 1.50-1 favorite | $200,800 |
| 2nd | 1 | 6 | Bold Ego | John Lively | Jack Van Berg | Double B Ranch | 3.60-1 | $40,000 |
| 3rd | 3 | 2 | Paristo | D. Curtis Ashcroft | George R. Handy | Belmont Farms | 74.30-1 | $20,000 |
| 4th | 8 | 10 | Thirty Eight Paces | William J. Passmore | King T. Leatherbury | Double Paces Stable | 27.00-1 | $10,000 |
| 5th | 101/2 | 6 | Partez | Sandy Hawley | D. Wayne Lukas | Elizabeth Davis | 7.60-1 | |
| 6th | 11 | 11 | Highland Blade | Jacinto Vásquez | David A. Whiteley | Pen-Y-Bryn Farm | 8.60-1 | |
| 7th | 111/4 | 13 | Escambia Bay | Mario Pino | J. William Boniface | Annette Eubanks | 48.80-1 | |
| 8th | 143/4 | 9 | Bare Knuckles | Rick D. Evans | Everett W. King | Barbara Kelly | 92.60-1 | |
| 9th | 151/4 | 5 | Double Sonic | Buck Thornburg | George Krnjaich | Fred Elias | 77.50-1 | |
| 10th | 151/2 | 1 | A Run | Frank J. Lovato, Jr. | Larry S. Barrera | Aaron U. Jones | 12.60-1 | |
| 11th | 16 | 8 | Woodchopper | Eddie Delahoussaye | John M. Gaver, Jr. | Greentree Stable | 4.10-1 | |
| 12th | 19 | 4 | Flying Nashua | Ángel Cordero Jr. | Larry S. Barrera | Holman Digiulio | 12.60-1 | |
| 13th | 27 | 3 | Top Avenger | Randy Romero | Dwight Viator | W. P. "Buster" Bishop | 48.80-1 | |

- Winning Breeder: Thomas Mellon Evans; (VA)
- Winning Time: 1:54 3/5
- Track Condition: Fast
- Total Attendance: 84,133
