= Pleasant Stage =

American-bred Thoroughbred racehorse

- Sire: Pleasant Colony
- Grandsire: His Majesty
- Dam: Meteor Stage
- Damsire: Stage Door Johnny
- Sex: Mare
- Foaled: March 14, 1989
- Country: United States
- Colour: Bay
- Breeder: Mrs. Thomas Evans
- Owner: Buckland Farm
- Trainer: Christopher Speckert
- Record: 10: 2-3-2
- Earnings: $844,272

Major wins
- Oak Leaf Stakes (1991); Breeders' Cup Juvenile Fillies (1991)

Awards
- American Champion Two-Year-Old Filly (1991)

Pleasant Stage (March 14, 1989 – August 28, 1992) was an American Thoroughbred Champion racehorse. After being beaten in her first two races she won the Oak Leaf Stakes before establishing herself as one of the leading juvenile fillies of her generation with a win in the Breeders' Cup Juvenile Fillies. After the end of the season she was voted American Champion Two-Year-Old Filly. Pleasant Stage failed to win in six races as a three-year-old but finished second in the Kentucky Oaks and the Acorn Stakes and third in the CCA Oaks. She died of a heart attack on August 28, 1992, at Del Mar Racetrack after an adverse reaction to a routine vitamin shot by her veterinarian.

== Background ==
Pleasant Stage was a bay filly bred in Kentucky by Mrs. Thomas Evans and raced in the colors of Thomas Mellon Evans's Buckland Farm. She was sired by Pleasant Colony, who won the Kentucky Derby and the Preakness Stakes in 1981. At stud, the best of his other progeny included Pleasant Tap and St Jovite. Pleasant Stage's dam Meteor Stage, was a Virginia-bred mare who failed to win in eleven races. She was granddaughter of Patelin, a broodmare whose other descendants have included I'll Have Another and the CCA Oaks winner Class Play. Buckland Farm's manager Pat Vickers described her as being a young horse with "a certain racing-filly look" who led the other yearlings around the field.

During her racing career Pleasant Stage was trained by Christopher Speckert.

== Racing career ==
=== 1991: two-year-old season ===
Pleasant Stage began her racing career at Del Mar racetrack in the late summer of 1991. On August 18 she started a 33.5/1 outsider for a six furlong maiden race and finished strongly to take third place behind Captivant and Praslin. Moved up in distance for a maiden over one mile in September she started favorite but was beaten two lengths into second place by Queens Court Queen. Despite her two defeats, the filly was stepped up in class for the Oak Leaf Stakes at Santa Anita Park on October 14 and started the 6.5/1 third choice in the betting behind the Sorrento Stakes winner Soviet Sojourn and the Del Mar Debutante Stakes winner La Spia. Ridden as in her previous start by the future U.S. Racing Hall of Fame jockey Eddie Delahoussaye, she was restrained in the early stages before taking the lead in the straight and winning by two lengths from Soviet Sojourn, with La Spia three lengths back in third.

On November 2, Pleasant Stage contested the eighth running of the Breeders' Cup Juvenile Fillies at Churchill Downs. In a fourteen-runner field she started at odds of 5.8/1 behind Preach (Frizette Stakes), Speed Dialer (Arlington-Washington Lassie Stakes) and the British challenger Culture Vulture, whilst the other runners included La Spia, Soviet Sojourn and Queens Court Queen. She started slowly and raced at the back of the field before moving up into fourth entering the straight. She produced a sustained run on the inside to overtake La Spia in the final strides to win by a head with Cadillac Women two and a half lengths back in third ahead of Speed Dialer, Spinning Round and Vivano. In the closing stages, the filly's 81-year-old owner repeatedly asked Pat Vickers "Is she going to get there": as Pleasant Stage crossed the line, Vickers replied "She's got it".

=== 1992: three-year-old season ===
On her three-year-old debut, Pleasant Stage started favorite for the Santa Anita Oaks on March 8, but finished fourth of the eight runners behind Golden Treat, Magical Maiden and Queens Court Queen. In the Ashland Stakes at Keeneland on 18 April she again started favorite and again finished fourth behind Prospectors Delite, Spinning Round and Luv Me Luv Me Not. Despite her indifferent early form, the filly started second choice in the betting behind the odds-on favorite Prospectors Delite for the Kentucky Oaks on May 1. After racing towards the rear of the field in the early stages she made progress in the straight to finish second, beaten half a length by Luv Me Luv Me Not, with Prospectors Delite a neck away in third place. In the Acorn Stakes at Belmont Park three weeks later, the filly finished second of the twelve runners, beaten two lengths by Prospectors Delite after being forced to the outside on the final turn. In the Mother Goose Stakes at the same track on June 7 she produced a "dull effort" when finishing last of the seven runners behind Turnback the Alarm. Jerry Bailey took over the ride, when Pleasant Stage was moved up in distant for the CCA Oaks over ten furlongs at Belmont on July 11. She finished third of the six runners beaten two and a half lengths behind the winner Turnback the Alarm.

In late August at Del Mar, Pleasant Stage had what her trainer described as an "apoplectic reaction" to a routine veterinary injection and died within two minutes.

== Assessment and awards ==
In the Eclipse Awards for 1991, Pleasant Stage was named American Champion Two-Year-Old Filly.

== Pedigree ==
Pedigree of Pleasant Stage (USA), bay mare, 1989
| Sire Pleasant Colony (USA) 1978 | His Majesty (USA); 1968 | Ribot | Tenerani |
| Sire Pleasant Colony (USA) 1978 | His Majesty (USA); 1968 | Ribot | Romanella |
| Sire Pleasant Colony (USA) 1978 | His Majesty (USA); 1968 | Flower Bowl | Alibhai |
| Sire Pleasant Colony (USA) 1978 | His Majesty (USA); 1968 | Flower Bowl | Flower Bed |
| Sire Pleasant Colony (USA) 1978 | Sun Colony (USA); 1968 | Sunrise Flight | Double Jay |
| Sire Pleasant Colony (USA) 1978 | Sun Colony (USA); 1968 | Sunrise Flight | Misty Morn |
| Sire Pleasant Colony (USA) 1978 | Sun Colony (USA); 1968 | Colonia | Cockrullah |
| Sire Pleasant Colony (USA) 1978 | Sun Colony (USA); 1968 | Colonia | Nalga |
| Dam Meteor Stage (USA) 1982 | Stage Door Johnny (USA); 1965 | Prince John | Princequillo |
| Dam Meteor Stage (USA) 1982 | Stage Door Johnny (USA); 1965 | Prince John | Not Afraid |
| Dam Meteor Stage (USA) 1982 | Stage Door Johnny (USA); 1965 | Peroxide Blonde | Ballymoss |
| Dam Meteor Stage (USA) 1982 | Stage Door Johnny (USA); 1965 | Peroxide Blonde | Folie Douce |
| Dam Meteor Stage (USA) 1982 | Northern Meteor (USA); 1975 | Northern Dancer | Nearctic |
| Dam Meteor Stage (USA) 1982 | Northern Meteor (USA); 1975 | Northern Dancer | Natalma |
| Dam Meteor Stage (USA) 1982 | Northern Meteor (USA); 1975 | Patelin | Cornish Prince |
| Dam Meteor Stage (USA) 1982 | Northern Meteor (USA); 1975 | Patelin | Pontivy (Family: 23-b) |
