= Corporate Report =

American-bred Thoroughbred racehorse

- Sire: Private Account
- Grandsire: Damascus
- Dam: Ten Cents a Kiss
- Damsire: Key to the Mint
- Sex: Stallion
- Foaled: 1988
- Country: United States
- Colour: Chestnut
- Breeder: Equigroup Thoroughbreds
- Owner: Overbrook Farm
- Trainer: D. Wayne Lukas
- Record: 10: 3-5-0
- Earnings: $1,067,908

Major wins
- Travers Stakes (1991) American Classic Race placing: Preakness Stakes 2nd (1991)
- Last updated on September 23, 2009

Corporate Report (foaled in Kentucky in May 1988) is a retired American Thoroughbred racehorse. A descendant of Damascus, he was sired by Private Account by breeder Equigroup Thoroughbreds. Corporate Report was a grade one stakes winning millionaire who won the Travers Stakes and finished second to dual classic winner Hansel in the 1991 Preakness Stakes.

== Early career ==
Corporate Report developed shin conditions late in his two-year-old season and did not race that year. In the early part of his three-year-old season, he broke his maiden. Trainer D. Wayne Lukas then decided to take him to Oaklawn Park Race Course and put him on the Arkansas track through the Triple Crown trail. After winning an allowance race, Corporate Report placed second in the grade two Rebel Stakes. He was entered in the grade two Arkansas Derby and placed second to Olympio.

His owners at Overbrook Farm were encouraged by the two graded stakes placings and entered Corporate Report in the 117th Kentucky Derby in 1991. In that race, Corporate Report shot to just off the lead and battled on the front end in third for most of the race. Coming down the long Churchill Downs stretch, many closers passed him in the lane as he faded to ninth. It was the only time in his career that he finished out of the money. Strike the Gold and Best Pal finished one-two.

== Preakness Stakes ==
Two weeks later, Corporate Report ran in the second jewel of the Triple Crown. The three top finishers in the Derby, along with Arkansas Derby winner Olympio, took most of the public support. Corporate Report was an 11-1 longshot in the grade one 1991 Preakness Stakes. All eight colts broke from the starting gate in good order. Passing the stands for the first time, Corporate Report battled with Olympio for the lead, with stalker Hansel one length back.

Corporate Report led around the clubhouse turn and down most of the backstretch. Hansel then took the lead and won by seven lengths. Corporate Report finished second, earning $100,000. The Derby winner, Strike the Gold, was never a factor and finished a distant sixth.

In addition to runner-up finishes in the Preakness Stakes, Arkansas Derby and Rebel Stakes, Corporate Report placed second in the grade one Haskell Invitational at Monmouth Park later that summer and placed second in the grade two Swaps Stakes at Hollywood Park in the autumn.

== Travers Stakes ==
On a muggy summer afternoon before 48,170 spectators at Saratoga Race Course, Corporate Report led almost wire to wire and beat Hansel by a neck in the Travers Stakes. Two and a half lengths back in third place came Fly So Free, last year's juvenile champion, and three lengths back in fourth place was the favorite, Strike the Gold.

== Retirement ==
Corporate Report stands at Erfle Thoroughbreds in North Dakota for $1,500.
