= 1991 Preakness Stakes =

116th running of the Preakness Stakes

116th Preakness Stakes
- The Preakness Stakes
- Location: Pimlico Race Course, Baltimore, Maryland, United States
- Date: May 18, 1991
- Winning horse: Hansel
- Jockey: Jerry Bailey
- Trainer: Frank Brothers
- Conditions: Fast
- Surface: Dirt

The 1991 Preakness Stakes was the 116th running of the Preakness Stakes thoroughbred horse race. The race took place on May 18, 1991, and was televised in the United States on the ABC television network. Hansel, who was jockeyed by Jerry Bailey, won the race by seven lengths over runner-up Corporate Report. Approximate post time was 5:32 p.m. Eastern Time. The race was run over a fast track in a final time of 1:54 flat. The Maryland Jockey Club reported total attendance of 96,695, this is recorded as second highest on the list of American thoroughbred racing top attended events for North America in 1991.

== Payout ==
The 116th Preakness Stakes Payout Schedule

| Program Number | Horse Name | Win | Place | Show |
|---|---|---|---|---|
| 4 | Hansel | US$20.20 | $10.80 | $8.00 |
| 1 | Corporate Report | - | $11.00 | $6.40 |
| 2 | Mane Minister | - | - | $5.80 |

$2 Exacta: (4–1) paid $212.20

$2 Trifecta: (4-1–2) paid $3,310.50

== The full chart ==
| Finish Position | Margin (lengths) | Post Position | Horse name | Jockey | Trainer | Owner | Post Time Odds | Purse Earnings |
|---|---|---|---|---|---|---|---|---|
| 1st | 0 | 4 | Hansel | Jerry Bailey | Frank Brothers | Lazy Lane Farms | 9.10-1 | $325,000 |
| 2nd | 7 | 1 | Corporate Report | Pat Day | D. Wayne Lukas | Overbrook Farm | 11.20-1 | $100,000 |
| 3rd | 9 3/4 | 2 | Mane Minister | Alex Solis | Juan Gonzalez | Trudy McCaffery | 18.90-1 | $50,000 |
| 4th | 13 1/2 | 7 | Olympio | Eddie Delahoussaye | Ronald McAnally | V. H. W. Stables | 2.40-1 | $25,000 |
| 5th | 14 | 5 | Best Pal | Gary Stevens | Ian P. Jory | Golden Eagle Farm | 2.70-1 | |
| 6th | 14 3/4 | 3 | Strike the Gold | Chris Antley | Nick Zito | B. Giles Brophy, William J. Condren, Joseph M. Cornacchia | 1.80-1 favorite | |
| 7th | 16 1/2 | 8 | Whadjathink | Jorge Velásquez | Michael Whittingham | Richard L. Duchossois | 35.50-1 | |
| 8th | 17 3/4 | 6 | Honor Grades | Chris McCarron | Rodney Rash | Summa Stable | 24.20-1 | |

- Winning Breeder: Marvin Little Jr.; (VA)
- Final Time: 1:54.00
- Track Condition: Fast
- Total Attendance: 96,695

== See also ==
- 1991 Kentucky Derby
