= Fly So Free =

American-bred Thoroughbred racehorse

- File So Free's grave at Three Chimneys Farm
- Sire: Time For A Change
- Grandsire: Damascus
- Dam: Free To Fly
- Damsire: Stevward
- Sex: Stallion
- Foaled: 1988
- Country: United States
- Colour: Dark Chestnut
- Breeder: Bruce Hundley & Wayne Garrison
- Owner: Tommy & Elizabeth Valando
- Trainer: Scotty Schulhofer
- Record: 33 : 12-5-3
- Earnings: $2,330,954

Major wins
- Champagne Stakes (1990); Breeders' Cup Juvenile (1990); Hutcheson Stakes (1991); Fountain of Youth Stakes (1991); Florida Derby (1991); Riva Ridge Stakes (1991); Jim Dandy Stakes (1991); Fall Highweight Handicap (1993)

Awards
- U.S. Champion 2-Yr-Old Colt
- Last updated on December 28, 2006

Fly So Free (March 3, 1988 – September 21, 2003) was an American Thoroughbred Champion racehorse. A grandson of U.S. Racing Hall of Fame inductee Damascus, he was owned by New York City Broadway theatre producer and music publishing company owner Tommy Valando and his wife Elizabeth.

In 1990, Fly So Free capped off a successful two-year-old racing campaign with a win in the Breeders' Cup Juvenile. Voted 1990's U.S. Champion 2-Yr-Old Colt, he went into the 1991 racing season ranked as a top contender for the U.S. Triple Crown series of races. En route, Fly So Free won the spring 1991 Hutcheson Stakes the Fountain of Youth Stakes and Florida Derby in which he defeated two other top three-year-olds, Strike the Gold and Hansel. A few weeks later, in mid-April's Blue Grass Stakes, Fly So Free finished second to Strike the Gold.

For the 1991 Kentucky Derby, bettors made Fly So Free the second choice to Hansel but both horses disappointed, Fly So Free finishing fifth and Hansel tenth to winner Strike the Gold. Fly So Free was not entered in the 1991 Preakness Stakes or the 1991 Belmont Stakes as trainer Scotty Schulhofer felt he was unable to run longer races. Instead, he competed in and won the Riva Ridge and the Jim Dandy Stakes.

Racing at age four, Fly So Free met with modest success, most notably a second to Strike the Gold in the 1992 Pimlico Special. At age five, near the end of the 1993 racing season, he won the Fall Highweight Handicap at Aqueduct Racetrack, a race in which a horse's ability to carry weight is put to the test. After a 9th-place finish in that year's Breeders' Cup Sprint, Fly So Free was retired to stud duty at Three Chimneys Farm in Midway, Kentucky, where he remained for the rest of his life.

Fly So Free sired five Group/Graded stakes race winners, including the 1999 Canadian Female Turf Horse Champion Free Vacation and the 2001 Dubai World Cup winner, Captain Steve.

In November 2002, Fly So Free was pensioned as a result of cardiac problems. He died of congestive heart failure on September 21, 2003, at Three Chimneys Farm, where he is buried.

== Pedigree ==
Pedigree of Fly So Free (USA), 1988
Sire Time For A Change (USA) b. 1981	Damascus (USA) b. 1964	Sword Dancer	Sunglow
Sire Time For A Change (USA) b. 1981	Damascus (USA) b. 1964	Sword Dancer	Highland Fling
Sire Time For A Change (USA) b. 1981	Damascus (USA) b. 1964	Kerala	My Babu
Sire Time For A Change (USA) b. 1981	Damascus (USA) b. 1964	Kerala	Blade of Time
Sire Time For A Change (USA) b. 1981	Resolver (USA) b. 1974	Reviewer	Bold Ruler
Sire Time For A Change (USA) b. 1981	Resolver (USA) b. 1974	Reviewer	Broadway
Sire Time For A Change (USA) b. 1981	Resolver (USA) b. 1974	Lovely Morning	Swaps
Sire Time For A Change (USA) b. 1981	Resolver (USA) b. 1974	Lovely Morning	Misty Morn
Dam Free to Fly (USA) b. 1974	Stevward (USA) b. 1959	Nashua	Nasrullah
Dam Free to Fly (USA) b. 1974	Stevward (USA) b. 1959	Nashua	Segula
Dam Free to Fly (USA) b. 1974	Stevward (USA) b. 1959	Sherry Jen	Sun Again
Dam Free to Fly (USA) b. 1974	Stevward (USA) b. 1959	Sherry Jen	Quittance
Dam Free to Fly (USA) b. 1974	Dancing Lark (USA) b. 1960	Native Dancer	Polynesian
Dam Free to Fly (USA) b. 1974	Dancing Lark (USA) b. 1960	Native Dancer	Geisha
Dam Free to Fly (USA) b. 1974	Dancing Lark (USA) b. 1960	Say Blue	Blue Larkspur
Dam Free to Fly (USA) b. 1974	Dancing Lark (USA) b. 1960	Say Blue	I Say
