= 1991 Cheltenham Gold Cup =

Horse race in England

The 1991 Cheltenham Gold Cup was a horse race which took place at Cheltenham on Thursday March 14, 1991. It was the 64th running of the Cheltenham Gold Cup, and it was won by Garrison Savannah. The winner was ridden by Mark Pitman and trained by Jenny Pitman. The pre-race favourite Celtic Shot finished seventh.

The field included a total of five Gold Cup winners of the past, present and future. Three weeks after his victory Garrison Savannah finished runner-up to Seagram in the Grand National.

== Race details ==
- Sponsor: Tote
- Winner's prize money: £98,578.00
- Going: Good
- Number of runners: 14
- Winner's time: 6m 50.0s

== Full result ==
	*	Horse	Age	Jockey	Trainer ^{†}	SP
1		Garrison Savannah	8	Mark Pitman	Jenny Pitman	16/1
2	shd	The Fellow	6	Adam Kondrat	François Doumen (FR)	28/1
3	15	Desert Orchid	12	Richard Dunwoody	David Elsworth	4/1
4	2½	Cool Ground	9	Luke Harvey	Reg Akehurst	7/1
5	hd	Kildimo	11	Robert Stronge	George M. Moore	66/1
6	2½	Nick the Brief	9	Robbie Supple	John Upson	12/1
7	2	Celtic Shot	9	Peter Scudamore	Charlie Brooks	5/2 fav
8		Yahoo	10	Norman Williamson	John Edwards	100/1
PU	Fence 20	Carrick Hill Lad	8	Mark Dwyer	Gordon W. Richards	11/1
PU	Fence 19	Arctic Call	8	Jamie Osborne	Oliver Sherwood	10/1
PU	Fence 19	Party Politics	7	Andrew Adams	Nick Gaselee	33/1
PU	Fence 19	Twin Oaks	11	Neale Doughty	Gordon W. Richards	11/1
Fell	Fence 17	Norton's Coin	10	Graham McCourt	Sirrel Griffiths	16/1
PU	Fence 11	Martin d'Or	7	J. Joly	Patrick Gautier (FR)	250/1

* The distances between the horses are shown in lengths or shorter. shd = short-head; hd = head; PU = pulled-up.
† Trainers are based in Great Britain unless indicated.

== Winner's details ==
Further details of the winner, Garrison Savannah:

- Foaled: 1983 in Ireland
- Sire: Random Shot; Dam: Merry Coin (Current Coin)
- Owner: Autofour Engineering
- Breeder: John McDowell
