= Bold Ego =

American-bred Thoroughbred racehorse

- Sire: Bold Tactics
- Grandsire: Bold Ruler
- Dam: Coya's Ego
- Damsire: Bullin
- Sex: Stallion
- Foaled: 1978
- Country: United States
- Colour: Bay
- Breeder: J. D. Barton
- Owner: Double B. Ranch/Dr. Joseph Kidd
- Trainer: 1) Clifford C. Lambert, Sr.; 2) Jack Van Berg
- Record: 35: 15-6-3
- Earnings: US$511,648

Major wins
- New Mexico Futurity (1980); Riley Allison Futurity (1980); Rio Grande Kindergarten Futurity (1980); Arkansas Derby (1981); Rebel Stakes (1981); Southwest Stakes (1981) Triple Crown races: 2nd: Preakness Stakes (1981)

Honours
- Bold Ego Handicap at Sunland Park

Bold Ego (March 2, 1978 – June 30, 1997) was an American Thoroughbred racehorse known for his blazing speed who won the 1981 Arkansas Derby and ran second in the Preakness Stakes. He was bred by J. D. Barton of Anthony, New Mexico and raced under his Double B. Ranch colors in a three-way partnership with Dr. Joseph Kidd and James Howard.

== Racing career ==
At age two in 1980, Bold Ego raced primarily at racetracks in New Mexico for trainer Clifford Lambert, where he won his first five races before finishing third in the Hollywood Juvenile Championship Stakes at Hollywood Park Racetrack in Inglewood, California. He ended the year having won seven of eight starts but had never been tested beyond six furlongs. Partway into the 1981 racing season, Lambert stepped down as trainer and recommended that the owners contact trainer Jack Van Berg. The future U.S. Racing Hall of Fame trainer inductee agreed to take over the conditioning of Bold Ego, so the horse was shipped to Van Berg's stable at Oaklawn Park Race Track. Under Van Berg and assistant trainer Dennis Werre, Bold Ego won Oaklawn's Southwest and Rebel Stakes followed by the prestigious Arkansas Derby, a win that propelled him into the U.S. Triple Crown picture.

=== Triple Crown races ===
Bold Ego went into the 1981 Kentucky Derby having won more races (10) and more purse money ($382,676) than any other entry. A frontrunner who was always difficult to rate, in the Derby Bold Ego got into a speed duel for the lead with Top Avenger and tired himself out by running the fastest times in the history of the race for the first quarter and first half. He finished tenth.

His connections felt that Bold Ego was much better than his performance in the Derby portrayed, so they shipped him to Pimlico Race Course in Baltimore, Maryland, to run in the second jewel of the Triple Crown: the $1,000,000 Grade 1 Preakness Stakes. In the 106th running of the Preakness, Bold Ego was listed on the morning line as the 7-2 second favorite in the field of thirteen colts. In the mile and three sixteenth race, he broke well in second place under new jockey John Lively. Going into Pimlico's famous "Clubhouse Turn," Bold Ego took the lead by a length. The pace was extremely fast, with the first quarter in :23-4/5 and the first half in :47-3/5. Bold Ego led down the backstretch and around the final turn in a quick mile in 1:36-2/5. At the top of the lane, he was challenged by the Kentucky Derby winner, Pleasant Colony. In the final sixteenth, both colts were set down to a hard drive with Bold Ego being urged with right-hand crosses by Lively and Pleasant Colony being urged strongly with left-handed whips. Pleasant Colony won by 3/4 of a length, and 75-1 longshot Paristo finished two lengths behind Bold Ego in third.

In the Belmont Stakes, Bold Ego was part of a pack of four leaders through the first half mile but dropped out of contention by the three-quarters mark and finished eleventh and last.

== Later career ==
Bold Ego won four races at age four and was retired to stud duty having earned more than half a million dollars in racing. During his stallion career, he stood at stud in Texas, New Mexico, and Arizona, siring 17 stakes winners. He died on June 30, 1997, from complications of colic.
