= Lexington Stakes (Keeneland) =

Grade III Thoroughbred horse race

- Class: Grade III
- Location: Keeneland Race Course; Lexington, Kentucky, United States
- Inaugurated: Initial: 1936–1942; Reestablished: 1973 (as Calumet Purse)
- Race type: Thoroughbred – Flat racing
- Sponsor: Stonestreet Farm (since 2017)
- Website: www.keeneland.com

Race information
- Distance: 1 1/16 miles
- Surface: Dirt
- Track: left-handed
- Qualification: Three-year-olds
- Weight: 123 lbs with allowances
- Purse: US$400,000 (since 2022)

The Lexington Stakes is a Grade III American Thoroughbred horse race for three-year-old horses at a distance of one and one-sixteenth miles on the dirt run annually in April at Keeneland Race Course in Lexington, Kentucky during their spring meeting. The event currently offers a purse of $400,000.

== History ==
The first running of the event was on 24 October 1936, closing day of Keeneland's inaugural fall meeting as a six-furlong race for two-year-olds and was won by Manhasset Stable's White Tie, who ran as an entry with Greentree Stable's Tattered (finished 5th), winning in a time of 1:12 flat. In 1938, the conditions of the event were changed to a handicap for horses three years old and older, and the distance was set at 1 1/8 miles. In 1940, the distance was extended to 1 1/4 miles for two runnings in which Joe DeSoto's Steel Heels won both events, including setting a new track record in 1941. In October 1942, Keeneland held its last meeting due to the track being closed during World War II, the event was run as the Lexington Purse over a distance of 1 1/16 miles.

In 1973, Keeneland scheduled an overnight allowance event as the Calumet Purse for three-year-old horses, which was held in April during the Spring meeting prior to the signature event of the meeting - Blue Grass Stakes. The event was named after Calumet Farm, a Thoroughbred breeding and training farm in Lexington. The 1975 winner of the event, Master Derby, not only completed this double but later in May of that year also won the middle leg of the U.S Triple Crown, Preakness Stakes.

In 1984, the event was renamed to the Lexington Stakes.

In 1986 the event was upgrade by the American Graded Stakes Committee to Grade III. Two years later the event was once again upgraded to Grade II and held this classification until 2010.

In 1989, the event was scheduled after the Blue Grass Stakes, and it is now rare for horses to run in both events.

The race was downgraded to Grade III status for 2011.

Since 2013, the event has been the last race with qualification points for the Road to the Kentucky Derby as a Wild Card event.

The event was not held in 2020 during Keeneland's spring meeting, which was moved to July and shortened due to the COVID-19 pandemic in the United States.

== Records ==
Speed record

- 1 1/16 miles – 1:41.00 Charismatic (1999)

Margins

- 9 lengths – Hansel (1991)

Most wins by a jockey

- 6 – Jerry Bailey (1982, 1990, 1991, 1993, 1999, 2004)

Most wins by a trainer

- 5 – Todd A. Pletcher (2005, 2008, 2009, 2010, 2013)

Most wins by an owner

- 2 – Junius W. Bell (1941, 1942)
- 2 – Russell L. Reineman Stable (1986, 1990)
- 2 – Bob Lewis & Beverly Lewis (1999, 2003)
- 2 – Fern Circle Stables (2017, 2021)
- 2 – Godolphin (2023, 2024)

== Winners ==
| Year | Winner | Age | Jockey | Trainer | Owner | Distance | Time | Purse | Grade | Ref |
|---|---|---|---|---|---|---|---|---|---|---|
Lexington Stakes
| 2026 | Trendsetter | 3 | Kazushi Kimura | Ben Colebrook | Midway Racing | 1 1/16 miles | 1:44.51 | $398,750 | III | |
| 2025 | Gosger | 3 | Irad Ortiz Jr. | Brendan P. Walsh | Harvey A. Clarke Racing Stables | 1 1/16 miles | 1:44.15 | $400,000 | III | |
| 2024 | Encino | 3 | Florent Geroux | Brad H. Cox | Godolphin | 1 1/16 miles | 1:43.93 | $365,500 | III | |
| 2023 | First Mission | 3 | Luis Saez | Brad H. Cox | Godolphin | 1 1/16 miles | 1:43.74 | $398,750 | III | |
| 2022 | Tawny Port | 3 | Florent Geroux | Brad H. Cox | Peachtree Stable | 1 1/16 miles | 1:45.24 | $398,750 | III | |
| 2021 | King Fury | 3 | Brian Hernandez Jr. | Kenneth G. McPeek | Fern Circle Stables & Three Chimneys Farm | 1 1/16 miles | 1:43.50 | $200,000 | III | |
| 2020 | Race not held | | | | | | | | | |
| 2019 | Owendale | 3 | Florent Geroux | Brad H. Cox | Rupp Racing | 1 1/16 miles | 1:44.14 | $200,000 | III | |
| 2018 | My Boy Jack | 3 | Kent J. Desormeaux | J. Keith Desormeaux | Don't Tell My Wife Stables & Monomoy Stables | 1 1/16 miles | 1:44.22 | $200,000 | III | |
| 2017 | Senior Investment | 3 | Channing Hill | Kenneth G. McPeek | Fern Circle Stables | 1 1/16 miles | 1:45.05 | $200,000 | III | |
| 2016 | Collected | 3 | Javier Castellano | Bob Baffert | Speedway Stable | 1 1/16 miles | 1:43.33 | $150,000 | III | |
| 2015 | Divining Rod | 3 | Julien R. Leparoux | Arnaud Delacour | Lael Stables | 1 1/16 miles | 1:43.29 | $250,000 | III | |
| 2014 | Mr. Speaker | 3 | Jose Lezcano | Claude R. McGaughey III | Phipps Stable | 1 1/16 miles | 1:44.18 | $200,000 | III | |
| 2013 | Winning Cause | 3 | Julien R. Leparoux | Todd A. Pletcher | Alto Racing | 1 1/16 miles | 1:43.93 | $200,000 | III | |
| 2012 | All Squared Away | 3 | Julio A. Garcia | Wesley A. Ward | Altamira Racing Stable & Wire to Wire Racing | 1 1/16 miles | 1:42.55 | $200,000 | III | |
| 2011 | Derby Kitten | 3 | Julien R. Leparoux | Michael J. Maker | Kenneth and Sarah Ramsey | 1 1/16 miles | 1:42.03 | $200,000 | III | |
| 2010 | Exhi | 3 | Robby Albarado | Todd A. Pletcher | Wertheimer et Frère | 1 1/16 miles | 1:44.38 | $300,000 | II | |
| 2009 | Advice | 3 | Garrett K. Gomez | Todd A. Pletcher | WinStar Farm | 1 1/16 miles | 1:43.33 | $300,000 | II | |
| 2008 | Behindatthebar | 3 | David R. Flores | Todd A. Pletcher | Padua Stables, Michael Shustek & W. Don Stanley | 1 1/16 miles | 1:42.14 | $325,000 | II | |
| 2007 | Slew's Tizzy | 3 | Robby Albarado | Gregory Fox | Joseph LaCombe Stable | 1 1/16 miles | 1:43.20 | $325,000 | II | |
| 2006 | Showing Up | 3 | Cornelio Velasquez | Barclay Tagg | Lael Stables | 1 1/16 miles | 1:46.42 | $325,000 | II | |
| 2005 | Coin Silver | 3 | Javier Castellano | Todd A. Pletcher | Peachtree Stable | 1 1/16 miles | 1:45.76 | $325,000 | II | |
| 2004 | Quintons Gold Rush | 3 | Jerry D. Bailey | Steven M. Asmussen | Padua Stables & Jay Manoogian | 1 1/16 miles | 1:43.82 | $325,000 | II | |
| 2003 | Scrimshaw | 3 | Edgar S. Prado | D. Wayne Lukas | Bob Lewis & Beverly Lewis | 1 1/16 miles | 1:45.47 | $363,675 | II | |
| 2002 | Proud Citizen | 3 | Mike E. Smith | D. Wayne Lukas | Robert C. Baker, David Cornstein & William L. Mack | 1 1/16 miles | 1:44.58 | $364,650 | II | |
| 2001 | Keats | 3 | Larry Melancon | Niall M. O'Callaghan | Henry E. Pabst | 1 1/16 miles | 1:43.54 | $371,475 | II | |
| 2000 | Unshaded | 3 | Shane Sellers | Carl A. Nafzger | James Tafel | 1 1/16 miles | 1:43.60 | $357,400 | II | |
| 1999 | Charismatic | 3 | Jerry D. Bailey | D. Wayne Lukas | Robert Lewis & Beverly Lewis | 1 1/16 miles | 1:41.00 | $378,700 | II | |
| 1998 | Classic Cat | 3 | Robby Albarado | David C. Cross Jr. | Gary M. Garber | 1 1/16 miles | 1:42.80 | $368,225 | II | |
| 1997 | Touch Gold | 3 | Gary L. Stevens | David E. Hofmans | Frank Stronach & Stonerside Stable | 1 1/16 miles | 1:43.20 | $188,650 | II | |
| 1996 | City by Night | 3 | Shane Sellers | Patrick B. Byrne | Nancy & Richard Kaster | 1 1/16 miles | 1:42.20 | $199,150 | II | |
| 1995 | Star Standard | 3 | Pat Day | Nicholas P. Zito | William J. Condren & Joseph Cornacchia | 1 1/16 miles | 1:45.00 | $161,100 | II | |
| 1994 | Southern Rhythm | 3 | Garrett K. Gomez | James O. Keefer | William Heiligbrodt, et al. | 1 1/16 miles | 1:45.60 | $137,250 | II | |
| 1993 | Grand Jewel | 3 | Jerry D. Bailey | Neil J. Howard | William S. Farish III & William S. Kilroy | 1 1/16 miles | 1:43.60 | $140,675 | II | |
| 1992 | My Luck Runs North | 3 | Ricardo D. Lopez | Angel M. Medina | Melvin A. Benitez | 1 1/16 miles | 1:44.00 | $137,050 | II | |
| 1991 | Hansel | 3 | Jerry D. Bailey | Frank L. Brothers | Lazy Lane Farms | 1 1/16 miles | 1:42.60 | $133,450 | II | |
| 1990 | Home At Last | 3 | Jerry D. Bailey | Carl A. Nafzger | Russell L. Reineman Stable | 1 1/16 miles | 1:43.40 | $112,900 | II | |
| 1989 | Notation | 3 | Pat Day | James W. Murphy | Joan C. Johnson | 1 1/16 miles | 1:44.40 | $110,250 | II | |
| 1988 | Risen Star | 3 | Jacinto Vasquez | Louie J. Roussel III | Louie J. Roussel III & Ronnie Lamarque | 1 1/16 miles | 1:42.80 | $105,600 | II | |
| 1987 | War | 3 | Herb McCauley | D. Wayne Lukas | Tom Gentry | 1 1/16 miles | 1:44.40 | $147,950 | III | |
| 1986 | § Wise Times | 3 | K. Keith Allen | Philip A. Gleaves | Russell L. Reineman Stable | 1 1/16 miles | 1:44.80 | $110,450 | III | |
| 1985 | Stephan's Odyssey | 3 | Laffit Pincay Jr. | Woodford C. Stephens | Henryk de Kwiatkowski | 1 1/16 miles | 1:42.60 | $53,500 | | |
| 1984 | He Is A Great Deal | 3 | Julio C. Espinoza | Bernard S. Flint | Bernard S. Flint & Michael Palmisano | 1 1/16 miles | 1:45.40 | $53,000 | | |
Calumet Purse
| 1983 | Highland Park | 3 | Jacinto Vasquez | Anthony L. Basile | Bwamazon Farm & Brereton C. Jones | 1 1/16 miles | 1:44.80 | $27,400 | | |
| 1982 | Stage Reviewer | 3 | Jerry D. Bailey | Lucien Laurin | Mrs. Lucien Laurin | 1 1/16 miles | 1:44.20 | $30,200 | | |
| 1981 | Swinging Light | 3 | Dan Delahoussaye | James P. Conway | Edgar Zantker | 1 1/16 miles | 1:44.20 | $25,000 | | |
| 1980 | Rockhill Native | 3 | John Oldham | Herbert K. Stevens | Harry A. Oak | 1 1/16 miles | 1:43.40 | $24,500 | | |
| 1979 | Pianist | 3 | Michael Morgan | Peter M. Howe | Pillar Farm | 1 1/16 miles | 1:43.00 | $23,600 | | |
| 1978 | Sensitive Prince | 3 | Mickey Solomone | H. Allen Jerkens | Joseph Taub | 1 1/16 miles | 1:44.80 | $15,000 | | |
| 1977 | Giboulee | 3 | Jeffrey Fell | Jacques Dumas | Jean-Louis Levesque | 1 1/16 miles | 1:42.80 | $15,000 | | |
| 1976 | No Link | 3 | Darrel McHargue | Douglas Davis Jr. | Fred Selz & Gus Blass | 1 1/16 miles | 1:43.20 | $15,000 | | |
| 1975 | Master Derby | 3 | Darrel McHargue | Smiley Adams | Golden Chance Farm | 1 1/16 miles | 1:42.60 | $15,000 | | |
| 1974 | Satan's Hills | 3 | David E. Whited | Peter W. Salmen Jr. | Crimson King Farm | 1 1/16 miles | 1:43.00 | $12,500 | | |
| 1973 | † Our Native | 3 | Don Brumfield | William Resseguet Jr. | Mrs. Elizabeth Prichard, Edward W. Thomas & William Resseguet Jr. | 1 1/16 miles | 1:42.80 | $12,500 | | |
| 1943–1972 | Race not held | | | | | | | | | |
Lexington Purse
| 1942 | Technician | 6 | Ovie Scurlock | Ross O. Higdon | Woolford Farm | 1 1/16 miles | 1:46.80 | $2,500 | | |
Lexington Handicap
| 1941 | Steel Heels | 5 | Jimmy George | Frank P. Letellier | Junius W. Bell | 1 1/4 miles | 2:03.40 | $2,500 | | |
| 1940 | Steel Heels | 4 | Albert Snider | Frank P. Letellier | Junius W. Bell | 1 1/4 miles | 2:04.20 | $2,500 | | |
| 1939 | Chief Onaway | 3 | Eddie Arcaro | Richard T. Watts | Lawrence Barker | 1 1/8 miles | 1:50.40 | $2,000 | | |
| 1938 | Tunica | 3 | George South | Charles C. Norman | Joe DeSopo | 1 1/8 miles | 1:49.40 | $1,975 | | |
Lexington Stakes
| 1937 | Co-Sport | 2 | Porter Roberts | Richard T. Runnels | Benjamin Friend | 6 furlongs | 1:12.80 | $4,050 | | |
| 1936 | § White Tie | 2 | Joseph Cowley | John M. Gaver Sr. | Manhasset Stable | 6 furlongs | 1:12.00 | $3,675 | | |

Legend:
All Weather Track Dirt
Notes:
† In the 1973 running of the event, Starkers finished first but was disqualified for interference and was placed second. Our Native was declared the winner.
§ Ran as part of an entry

== See also ==
- Road to the Kentucky Derby
- List of American and Canadian Graded races
