= Thomas Mellon Evans =

American businessman

- Born: September 8, 1910; Pittsburgh, Pennsylvania, U.S.
- Died: July 17, 1997 (aged 86); New York City, U.S.
- Education: Shady Side Academy, Yale University
- Occupations: Financier, racehorse owner and breeder
- Political party: Republican
- Board member of: Evans & Company, Evans Broadcasting Corp., H.K. Porter, Inc., Crane Co., National Museum of Racing
- Spouses: Elizabeth Jane Parker (div. 1953) 2) Josephine Schlotman Mitchell (1953–1977): 3); Betty Blackmond Barton Ready Loomis (m. 1977)
- Children: 3, including Edward P. Evans

Thomas Mellon Evans (September 8, 1910 – July 17, 1997) was an American financier who was one of the country's early corporate raiders, as well as a philanthropist and Thoroughbred racehorse owner and breeder who with Pleasant Colony won the 1981 Kentucky Derby and Preakness Stakes.

== Pioneer takeover specialist ==
Born James Evans in Pittsburgh, Pennsylvania, to Thomas Mellon Evans and Martha Jarnagin, his mother had his name changed to honor his recently deceased father in 1913. Evans's great-grandmother Elinor was the sister of Thomas Mellon, the father of the wealthy financier, Andrew W. Mellon. Orphaned as a young boy, Thomas was sent to stay with his mother's relatives in Tennessee before returning to Pittsburgh to live with his mother's sister. She and her husband were affluent enough to provide Thomas with a quality education and he graduated from the Shady Side Academy private school in 1927 and Yale University in 1931.

For a few years after finishing university, Thomas Evans held a clerical job at Gulf Oil, owned at the time by the Mellon family. Ambitious, he saved as much money as he could from his salary and together with a small inheritance, set out on his own. In 1939, he was able to purchase the bankrupt H.K. Porter, Inc., a manufacturer of light-duty railroad locomotives that he would diversify into the steel, hardware, and construction material business before converting the company into a holding corporation that would, during Evans time, take over more than eighty United States companies.

Among his major acquisitions was the 1959 takeover of Crane Co. of Chicago, then a large valve and plumbing fixture manufacturer. In April 1959 Evans was appointed Chairman of the Board and Chief executive officer of the company. As of the end of 2011, his son Robert is Chairman of the Board of Crane Co. and remains the largest individual shareholder in the company.

The July 23, 2000, edition of the Pittsburgh Post-Gazette said that Thomas Mellon Evans was "arguably one of the seminal figures of 20th-century business." Evans' story was told by Diana B. Henriques in her book The White Sharks of Wall Street: Thomas Mellon Evans and the Original Corporate Raiders published by Scribner in 2000 (ISBN 0684833999 – Library of Congress Online Catalog).

== Buckland Farm ==
In 1956, Evans bought a 495-acre cattle farm in Gainesville, Virginia, and converted it to a Thoroughbred breeding operation under the name Buckland Farm. The farm was managed and directed by Don M. Robertson, General Manager of the farm and a Vice President of its incorporation. Robertson, a Central Kentucky native whose family heritage consisted of a long line of excellent Thoroughbred horsemen, chose the matches between stallions and mares for Buckland Farm. It was Robertson who produced the winning bloodlines for the farm, including Pleasant Colony. During Evans' years in racing, trainers who conditioned his horses included John Campo, Ángel Cordero Jr., LeRoy Jolley, Ross Pearce, and Christopher Speckert.

In addition to Pleasant Colony, Thomas Evans owned a number of stakes winners including Pleasant Stage, winner of the 1991 Breeders' Cup Juvenile Fillies and American Champion Two-Year-Old Filly, plus the 1992 American Champion Older Male Horse, Pleasant Tap.

Thomas Evans was a member of the board of directors of the National Museum of Racing and Hall of Fame and a member of The Jockey Club, the Thoroughbred Owners and Breeders Association, and the Virginia Thoroughbred Association. In 1993, he was inducted into the Virginia Thoroughbred Association Hall of Fame.

Sons Edward and Robert became significant owners and/or breeders of Thoroughbred racehorses, with Robert owning the 2014 Belmont Stakes winner Tonalist, a grandson of Pleasant Colony.
