= Pleasant Tap =

American-bred Thoroughbred racehorse

- Sire: Pleasant Colony
- Grandsire: His Majesty
- Dam: Never Knock
- Damsire: Stage Door Johnny
- Sex: Stallion
- Foaled: 1987
- Country: United States
- Colour: Brown
- Breeder: Buckland Farm
- Owner: Buckland Farm
- Trainer: Christopher Speckert
- Record: 32: 9-9-5
- Earnings: $2,021,169

Major wins
- Sunny Slope Stakes (1989); Malibu Stakes (1990); Goodwood Handicap (1991); San Bernardino Handicap (1991); Jockey Club Gold Cup (1992); Suburban Handicap (1992); Churchill Downs Handicap (1992); Commonwealth Breeders' Cup Stakes (1992)

Awards
- American Champion Older Male Horse (1992)

Pleasant Tap (May 8, 1987 – October 8, 2010) was an American Thoroughbred racehorse and sire.

== Background ==
He was sired by 1981 Kentucky Derby and Preakness Stakes winner Pleasant Colony, out of the mare Never Knock. He was bred by the late Thomas Mellon Evans of Buckland Farm.

== Racing career ==
At age three, Pleasant Tap finished third to Unbridled in the 1990 Kentucky Derby under jockey Kent Desormeaux. He then injured a tendon sheath just before the Preakness Stakes, sidelining him for part of the 1990 season and keeping him out of the Preakness and Belmont Stakes. Returning to racing in 1991, he won the Goodwood Handicap and the San Bernardino Handicap, and placed second in the Breeders' Cup Sprint.

In 1992, Pleasant Tap won the Grade I Jockey Club Gold Cup and the Suburban Handicap. Ridden by Gary Stevens, he placed second to A. P. Indy in the Breeders' Cup Classic and was awarded the U.S. Outstanding Older Male Horse for 1992.

== Retirement ==
Pleasant Tap entered stud in 1993 at Buckland Farm near Lexington and stood there until he was relocated to Lane's End Farm in Versailles, Kentucky in 1997. He sired graded stakes race winners Tap Dance City, David Junior, Premium Tap, Tiago and Pleasant Breeze.

== Sire line tree ==
- Pleasant Tap
  - Pleasant Breeze
  - Tap Dance City
  - David Junior
  - Premium Tap
    - Aan Alawaan
    - Amtae
    - Aelam Beladi
  - Tiago
    - Viva Majorca
  - Sahara Sky
    - Sky Judge
