= Mane Minister =

American-bred Thoroughbred racehorse

- Sire: Deputy Minister
- Grandsire: Vice Regent
- Dam: Lacework
- Damsire: In Reality
- Sex: Stallion
- Foaled: 1988
- Country: United States
- Colour: Dark Bay/Brown
- Breeder: Normandy Farm
- Owner: Trudy McCaffery & John Toffan
- Trainer: J. Paco Gonzalez
- Record: 12: 3-0-5
- Earnings: US$374,776

Major wins
- Pirate Cove Stakes (1991); Santa Catalina Stakes (1991)
- Last updated on January 1, 2010

Mane Minister (foaled 1988 in Kentucky, died in 2010) was an American Thoroughbred racehorse best remembered as the first and, at present, the only, horse to finish third in all three of the U.S. Triple Crown races. Bred by Normandy Farm in Lexington, Kentucky, he was out of the mare Lacework, whose sire was In Reality, winner of the 1967 Florida Derby and the leading sire of two-year-olds in 1977. Mane Minister's sire was Deputy Minister, the 1981 Canadian Horse of the Year and the leading sire in North America in 1997 and 1998. Deputy Minister, his sire Vice Regent, and his grandsire Northern Dancer are all Canadian Horse Racing Hall of Fame inductees.

Purchased and raced by Californian Trudy McCaffery and Canadian John Toffan, Mane Minister scored his most important win in the 1991 Santa Catalina Stakes. He went that year on to finish third to Strike the Gold in the Kentucky Derby and third to Hansel in the Preakness and Belmont Stakes.

Retired to stud duty, in the United States Mane Minister notably sired Bosque Redondo, who raced for McCaffery and Toffan and in 2002 won the San Bernardino Handicap and Tokyo City Cup. Since 1997, Mane Minister has stood at stud in Brazil.
