= Pleasant Colony =

American-bred Thoroughbred racehorse

- Sire: His Majesty
- Grandsire: Ribot
- Dam: Sun Colony
- Damsire: Sunrise Flight
- Sex: Stallion
- Foaled: 1978
- Country: United States
- Colour: Dark Bay
- Breeder: Thomas Mellon Evans
- Owner: Buckland Farm
- Trainer: John P. Campo
- Record: 14: 6–3–1
- Earnings: $965,383

Major wins
- Remsen Stakes (1980); Wood Memorial Stakes (1981); Woodward Stakes (1981) American Triple Crown wins: Kentucky Derby (1981); Preakness Stakes (1981)

Awards
- American Champion 3-Yr-Old Colt (1981)

Honours
- Aiken Thoroughbred Racing Hall of Fame (1982)
- Last updated on January 23, 2010

Pleasant Colony (May 4, 1978 – December 31, 2002) was a champion American Thoroughbred racehorse who won the 1981 Kentucky Derby and Preakness Stakes and was named the 1981 American Champion Three-Year-Old.

== Background ==
A big, gangly horse standing just under seventeen hands, Pleasant Colony was a grandson of Ribot. He was bred by Wall Street financier Thomas Mellon Evans and raced under his Buckland Farm banner.

== Early racing career ==
At age two, Pleasant Colony won two of his five starts including the Remsen Stakes. At age three, in the spring of 1981 he was second in the Fountain of Youth Stakes. Pleasant Colony lost 3 of 4 races to Akureyri. He lost the Fountain of Youth Stakes and the Pilgrim Stakes besides finishing behind Akureyri in the Florida Derby. He also was defeated by Akureyri in the Remsen Stakes but was placed first through disqualification. After Pleasant Colony's fifth-place finish in March's Florida Derby, his owner dismissed his trainer and replaced him with John P. Campo. Ridden by jockey Jeffrey Fell, Pleasant Colony then won April's Wood Memorial Stakes by three lengths.

== Triple Crown races ==
In the 1981 Kentucky Derby under regular jockey Jorge Velásquez, Pleasant Colony held off a powerful stretch drive by Woodchopper to win by three-quarters of a length. The expected rivalry with Woodchopper never materialized in the Preakness Stakes. Pleasant Colony came from behind to win by a length over Arkansas Derby winner Bold Ego with Woodchopper far back in eleventh place. In the third and final leg of the Triple Crown series, the Belmont Stakes, Pleasant Colony finished third to winner Summing.

== Later racing career ==
Pleasant Colony won the Grade I Woodward Stakes. After a fourth in the Marlboro Cup Invitational Handicap, and a reported leg injury, he was retired to stud duty at Buckland Farm. At year's end, he was voted the Eclipse Award for Outstanding 3-Year-Old Male Horse.

== As a sire ==
From 1982 at age 4, until 1998 at age 20, Pleasant Colony stood at Thomas Mellon Evans's Buckland Farm annex outside Lexington, Kentucky on Paris Pike near the Fayette County and Bourbon County line. He became a very significant sire, producing seventy-three stakes race winners including more than a dozen Grade I winners and the following champions:

- Pleasant Stage – the 1991 Champion Two-Year-Old Filly and winner of the Breeders' Cup Juvenile Fillies
- Pleasant Tap – the 1992 Champion Older Male
- St Jovite – winner of the 1992 Irish Derby and King George VI and Queen Elizabeth Stakes
- Pleasantly Perfect – winner of the 2003 Breeders' Cup Classic and 2004 Dubai World Cup, and sire of the champion sprinter Whitmore
- Colonial Colony – winner of the 2004 Stephen Foster Handicap

Pleasant Colony's daughters have produced a number of Grade 1 stakes race winners. He is the damsire of Forestry, sire of The Green Monkey sold at the February 2006 Fasig-Tipton Florida auction for a world record price of $16-million. The Green Monkey had almost no success at the racetrack and is now standing at stud.

Following his owner's death in 1997, Pleasant Colony was sent to Blue Ridge Farm in Upperville, Virginia, where he died in 2002 at age 24.

After his death, Pleasant Colony returned to Buckland Farm to be buried in the primary field of Barn 4, the Broodmare Barn, in the field adjacent to the farm's main house site.

Pleasant Colony's veterinarian Dr. Janice Runkle, 27 at the time, was the first female vet ever to care for a Derby entrant or winner. Later in the summer of 1981 her body was found in a bushy beach area on the shore of Lake Michigan north of Chicago, the ruling of suicide remains controversial decades later.

== Sire line tree ==
- Pleasant Colony
  - Lac Ouimet
  - Pleasant Variety
  - Cherokee Colony
    - Cherokeeinthehills
  - Pleasant Tap
    - Pleasant Breeze
    - Tap Dance City
    - David Junior
    - Premium Tap
      - Aan Alawaan
      - Amtae
      - Aelam Beladi
    - Tiago
      - Viva Majorca
    - Sahara Sky
      - Sky Judge
  - Roanoke
  - Sir Beaufort
  - St Jovite
    - Amerique
  - Colonial Affair
    - Cafrune
  - Behrens
  - Forbidden Apple
    - Forbidden Bear
  - Colonial Colony
  - Denon
  - Pleasantly Perfect
    - Rapid Redux
    - Idalino
    - Whitmore
    - King Of The Sun
    - Secret Lover
  - Official Visit
    - Almobeer

== Pedigree ==
Pedigree of Pleasant Colony
| Sire His Majesty bay 1968 | Ribot bay 1952 | Tenerani | Bellini |
| Sire His Majesty bay 1968 | Ribot bay 1952 | Tenerani | Tofanella |
| Sire His Majesty bay 1968 | Ribot bay 1952 | Romanella | El Greco |
| Sire His Majesty bay 1968 | Ribot bay 1952 | Romanella | Barbara Burrini |
| Sire His Majesty bay 1968 | Flower Bowl bay 1952 | Alibhai | Hyperion |
| Sire His Majesty bay 1968 | Flower Bowl bay 1952 | Alibhai | Teresina |
| Sire His Majesty bay 1968 | Flower Bowl bay 1952 | Flower Bed | Beau Pere |
| Sire His Majesty bay 1968 | Flower Bowl bay 1952 | Flower Bed | Boudoir |
| Dam Sun Colony bay 1968 | Sunrise Flight drk.brn. 1959 | Double Jay | Balladier |
| Dam Sun Colony bay 1968 | Sunrise Flight drk.brn. 1959 | Double Jay | Broomshot |
| Dam Sun Colony bay 1968 | Sunrise Flight drk.brn. 1959 | Misty Morn | Princequillo |
| Dam Sun Colony bay 1968 | Sunrise Flight drk.brn. 1959 | Misty Morn | Grey Flight |
| Dam Sun Colony bay 1968 | Colonia bay 1959 | Cockrullah | Nasrullah |
| Dam Sun Colony bay 1968 | Colonia bay 1959 | Cockrullah | Summerleaze |
| Dam Sun Colony bay 1968 | Colonia bay 1959 | Nalga | Guatan |
| Dam Sun Colony bay 1968 | Colonia bay 1959 | Nalga | Nagoya |

== See also ==
- List of racehorses
