= Frank L. Brothers =

American horse trainer

Frank Brothers
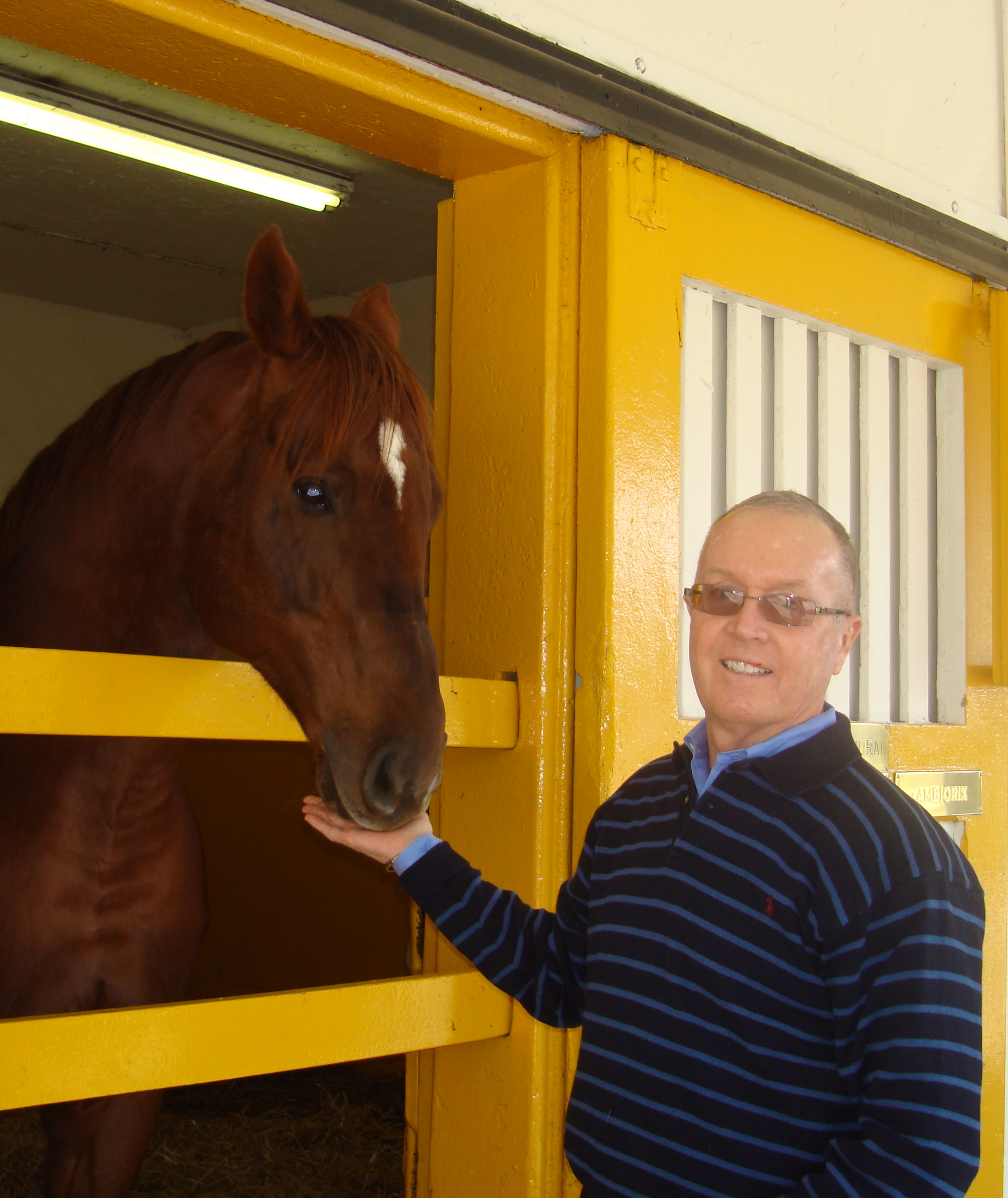

Personal information
- Born: October 24, 1946 (age 79) New Orleans, Louisiana
- Occupation: Trainer

Horse racing career
- Sport: Horse racing
- Career wins: 2,359

Major racing wins
- Black Gold Stakes (1979); Louisiana Handicap (1979); Arkansas Derby (1989); Clark Handicap (1990); Tremont Stakes (1990); Lane's End Stakes (1991); Lexington Stakes (1991); Del Mar Debutante Stakes (1992); Fayette Stakes (1992, 1998); Del Mar Derby (1994); Astoria Stakes (1996); Spinaway Stakes (1996); Blue Grass Stakes (1997); Fountain of Youth Stakes (1997, 2006); Gulfstream Park Sprint Championship (1997); Super Derby (1998); Louisiana Derby (2000); Maker's Mark Mile Stakes (2000); Ashland Stakes (2004); Forward Gal Stakes (2004); Champagne (2005); Hopeful Stakes (2005); Inside Information Stakes (2005); Princess Rooney Handicap (2005); Vinery Madison Stakes (2005); Alcibiades Stakes (2006) American Classic Race wins: Preakness Stakes (1991); Belmont Stakes (1991)

Racing awards
- Outstanding Thoroughbred Trainer Award (1991); Leading trainer at Louisiana Downs (nine consecutive times 1980-1988); Leading trainer at Fair Grounds Race Course (six times), Leading trainer at Oaklawn Park (two times), Leading trainer at Keeneland (Spring 1999)

Honors
- Fair Grounds Racing Hall of Fame (1992)

Significant horses
- First Samurai, Hansel, Pulpit, Arch, Madcap Escapade, Mighty
- Updated on April 10, 2019

Frank L. Brothers (born October 24, 1946, in New Orleans, Louisiana) is a former American Thoroughbred racehorse trainer.

== Career ==
Brothers was active in training racehorses from 1980 to 2009 with a career win percentage of just over 23%, winning 2,291 races, including 262 stakes winners of which 50 were graded stakes wins. Among those stakes winners was Hansel who in 1991 won two of the three U.S. Triple Crown races. He was voted the Outstanding Thoroughbred Trainer Award from the United Thoroughbred Trainers of America in 1991 and was inducted into the Fair Grounds Racing Hall of Fame that same year. In 2015 he was inducted into the Louisiana Sports Hall of Fame.

== Horses ==
Beyond Hansel, Brothers also trained Secret Hello (GI); Arch (GI); Pulpit (GII); Mighty (GII); Oath (GI), Madcap Escapade (GI) and First Samurai (GI). Many of these horses Brothers purchased at auction and developed into stakes winners. Brothers' complete list of graded stakes winners trained: Appealing Breeze; Arch; Auto Dial; Barkerville; Beal Street Blues; Bel Air Beauty; Conserve; Dansil; Fast Catch; First Samurai; Frisco View; Hansel; Madcap Escapade; Mighty; Move; Noble Savage; Oath; Ocean Crest; Pulpit; Secret Hello; Tessa Blue; Trip and Watch.

Graded stakes winners Brothers purchased and trained: Arch; Beal Street Blues; Bel Air Beauty; First Samurai; Hansel; Madcap Escapade; Mighty; Secret Hello and Tessa Blue.

Graded stakes winners Brothers purchased but did not train: Algorithms, Intense Holiday (MGSW), Itsaknockout, Position Limit, Shanghai Bobby (MGSW), and Uncle Vinny.

== After training ==
Upon retirement from training, Brothers became a bloodstock agent and was active in that aspect of the industry as of 2019. He bought horses and/or acted as racing advisor for Starlight Racing and a few other clients. He also worked part-time on the sales inspection team for the Keeneland Racing Association. Since beginning his career as a bloodstock agent he purchased—as yearlings—graded stakes winners: Algorithms, Intense Holiday (MGSW), Itsaknockout, Position Limit, Shanghai Bobby (MGSW), Uncle Vinny and Cutting Humor.

== Personal life ==
A resident of Louisville, Kentucky, Frank Brothers is married to former jockey and television racing analyst, Donna Barton Brothers.
