= Hansel (horse) =

American-bred Thoroughbred racehorse

- Sire: Woodman
- Grandsire: Mr. Prospector
- Dam: Count on Bonnie
- Damsire: Dancing Count
- Sex: Stallion
- Foaled: March 12, 1988
- Died: June 13, 2017 (aged 29)
- Country: United States
- Colour: Bay
- Breeder: Marvin Little, Jr.
- Owner: Lazy Lane Farm; Sheik Maktoum bin Rashid Al Maktoum
- Trainer: Frank L. Brothers
- Record: 14: 7-2-3
- Earnings: $2,936,586

Major wins
- Arlington-Washington Futurity Stakes (1990); Tremont Stakes (1990); Jim Beam Stakes (1991); Lexington Stakes (1991) Triple Crown race wins: Preakness Stakes (1991); Belmont Stakes (1991)

Awards
- U.S. Champion 3-Yr-Old Colt

Honours
- Hansel Stakes at Turfway Park
- Last updated on January 10, 2007

Hansel (March 12, 1988 – June 13, 2017) was an American Thoroughbred racehorse who won the final two legs of the U.S. Triple Crown races in 1991 and was voted the Eclipse Award for Outstanding 3-Year-Old Male Horse. Out of the mare Count on Bonnie, his sire was Woodman, a Champion 2-year-old colt in Ireland who was a son of the influential Champion sire Mr. Prospector. Woodman also sired the 1994 Breeders' Cup Juvenile and Preakness Stakes winner, Timber Country, as well as the 1999 Canadian Champion 3-Year-Old Colt and Queen's Plate winner, Woodcarver. Hansel's owner was banker Joe Allbritton, who raced him under his Lazy Lane Farm banner.

== Early years ==
Hansel was purchased for $150,000 on the advice of Frank Brothers. His name comes from the story of Hansel and Gretel.

Hansel had success racing at age two, winning the Grade III Tremont Stakes and the Grade II Arlington-Washington Futurity Stakes and finishing second in the Grade I Hopeful Stakes at Saratoga Race Course.

== Three-year-old season ==
In 1991, Hansel began his three-year-old campaign at the end of March when he won the Grade II Jim Beam Stakes at Turfway Park in Florence, Kentucky, in track record time. In April, he finished third in the Grade I Florida Derby behind the 1990 U.S. Champion 2-Year-Old Fly So Free and second-place finisher Strike the Gold. Due to the result, jockey Pat Day had pulled out of the 1991 Jim Beam Stakes. Two weeks prior to the Derby, Hansel won the grade two Lexington Stakes at Keeneland Racecourse.

In the 1991 Kentucky Derby, Hansel was the betting favorite but after a mile tired badly and finished tenth. On the result, Frank Brothers said,"I'd like to be able to give you a reason why he ran so bad, but I just can't". As a result of his poor performance, trainer Frank Brothers initially decided to skip the Preakness Stakes. However, after a good workout by Hansel and encouragement from Hall of Fame trainer Jack Van Berg, for whom he had worked as an assistant, Brothers changed his mind and shipped the colt to Pimlico Race Course. Hansel beat the Preakness field of eight by seven lengths. He finished ahead of place runners Corporate Report and Mane Minister with Best Pal and Strike the Gold finishing fifth and sixth respectively.

In the 1991 Belmont Stakes, Hansel had to race without Lasix, a drug used to control bleeding that the NYRA had banned at the time. As a result, bettors made Strike the Gold their first choice. However, Hansel held off a late charge by Strike the Gold to win the Belmont Stakes by a head, with Mane Minister finishing third as he had in the Derby and Preakness.

Hansel became the first "Dual Classic Winner" to win the last two jewels of the Triple Crown since Risen Star in 1988. He was awarded the fifth $1,000,000 Chrysler Triple Crown Bonus. Hansel also finished second to Corporate Report in the 1991 Travers Stakes at Saratoga. He was then named American Champion Three-Year-Old Male Horse winning the Eclipse Award by a comfortable margin over the other finalists.

== Retirement ==
In early September 1991, Hansel was sold to Sheik Maktoum bin Rashid Al Maktoum and was retired at the end of the racing season to stand at stud at the Sheik's Gainsborough Stud. Under the terms of the sale, Joe Lewis Allbritton retained breeding interest in him. During the 1998 and 1999 breeding seasons, Hansel was sent to stand at Questroyal Stud, LLC. in Claverack, New York, after which he was sent to breeders in Japan, where he remained until 2006. He returned home to stand at Allbritton's Lazy Lane Farm in Upperville, Virginia (formerly Isabel Dodge Sloane's Brookmeade Stud), and stood there until he was pensioned in 2012. Hansel was euthanized on June 13, 2017, due to infirmities of old age at his home farm.

Hansel sired five graded stakes winners, most notably the French Gr.I winner Loving Claim and multiple graded stakes winner Guided Tour, who earned more than $1.9 million. Hansel is the broodmare sire of five graded stakes winners, including Sharp Humor, who won the Gr.II Swale Stakes.

Prior to his death, Hansel was the oldest living winner of the Preakness and Belmont Stakes.

== Pedigree ==
Pedigree of Hansel
| Sire Woodman chestnut 1983 | Mr. Prospector bay 1970 | Raise A Native chestnut 1961 | Native Dancer |
| Sire Woodman chestnut 1983 | Mr. Prospector bay 1970 | Raise A Native chestnut 1961 | Raise You |
| Sire Woodman chestnut 1983 | Mr. Prospector bay 1970 | Gold Digger bay 1962 | Nashua |
| Sire Woodman chestnut 1983 | Mr. Prospector bay 1970 | Gold Digger bay 1962 | Sequence |
| Sire Woodman chestnut 1983 | Playmate chestnut 1975 | Buckpasser bay 1963 | Tom Fool |
| Sire Woodman chestnut 1983 | Playmate chestnut 1975 | Buckpasser bay 1963 | Busanda |
| Sire Woodman chestnut 1983 | Playmate chestnut 1975 | Intriguing chestnut 1964 | Swaps |
| Sire Woodman chestnut 1983 | Playmate chestnut 1975 | Intriguing chestnut 1964 | Glamour |
| Dam Count On Bonnie bay 1981 | Dancing Count bay 1978 | Northern Dancer bay 1961 | Nearctic |
| Dam Count On Bonnie bay 1981 | Dancing Count bay 1978 | Northern Dancer bay 1961 | Natalma |
| Dam Count On Bonnie bay 1981 | Dancing Count bay 1978 | Snow Court bay 1957 | King's Bench |
| Dam Count On Bonnie bay 1981 | Dancing Count bay 1978 | Snow Court bay 1957 | Snow Cloud |
| Dam Count On Bonnie bay 1981 | Buena Notte bay 1972 | Victoria Park bay 1957 | Chop Chop |
| Dam Count On Bonnie bay 1981 | Buena Notte bay 1972 | Victoria Park bay 1957 | Victoriana |
| Dam Count On Bonnie bay 1981 | Buena Notte bay 1972 | Midinette bay 1958 | Tantieme |
| Dam Count On Bonnie bay 1981 | Buena Notte bay 1972 | Midinette bay 1958 | Milonga |
