= Strike the Gold =

American-bred Thoroughbred racehorse

Strike The Gold
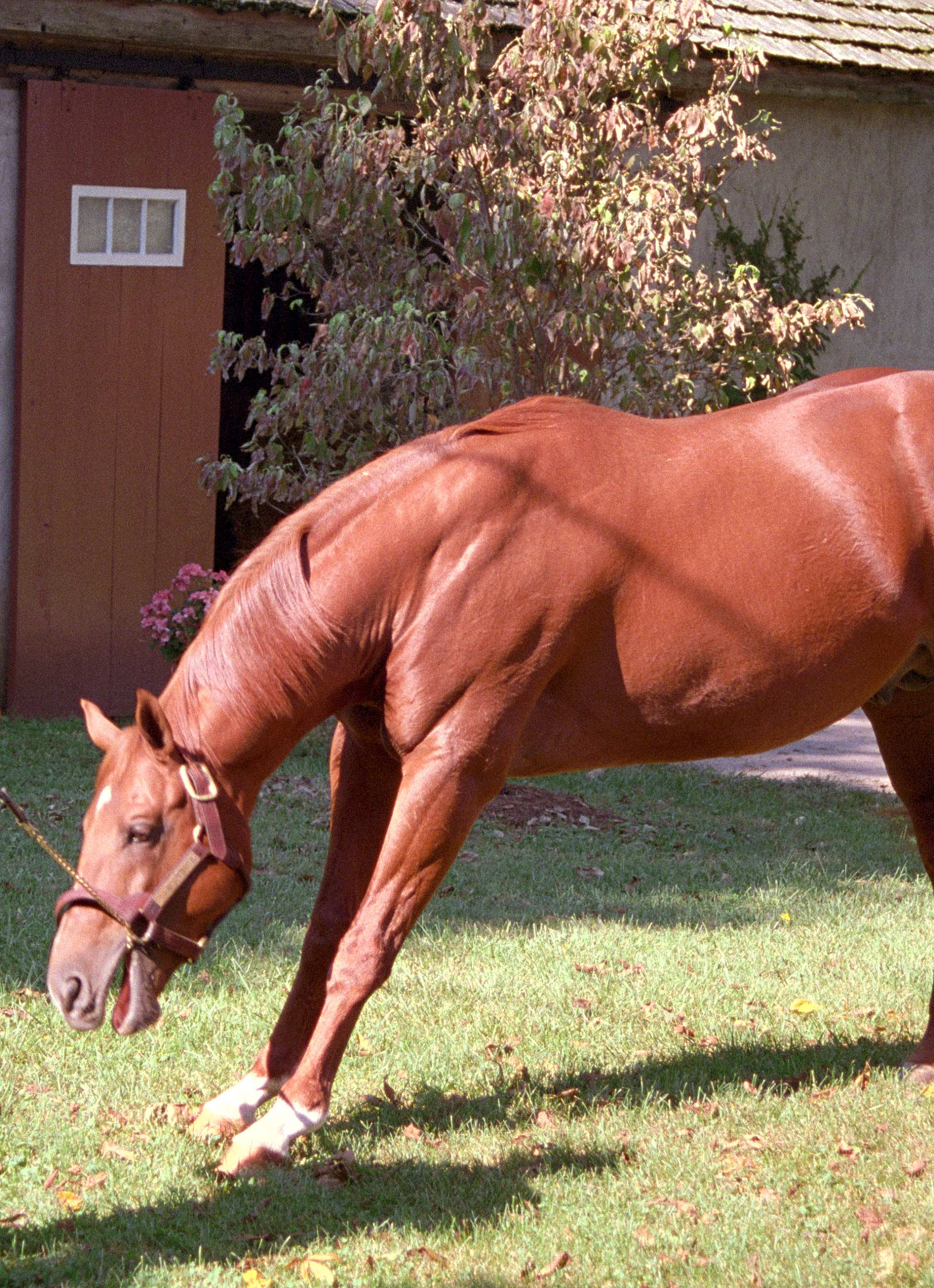
- Strike the Gold.
- Sire: Alydar
- Grandsire: Raise a Native
- Dam: Majestic Gold
- Damsire: Hatchet Man
- Sex: Stallion
- Foaled: 21 March 1988
- Died: December 13, 2011 (aged 23)
- Country: United States
- Colour: Chestnut
- Breeder: Calumet Farm
- Owner: BCC Stable
- Trainer: Nick Zito
- Record: 31: 6-8-5
- Earnings: $3,457,026

Major wins
- Blue Grass Stakes (1991); Nassau County Handicap (1992); Pimlico Special (1992); American Classic race wins: Kentucky Derby (1991)
- Last updated on January 8, 2007

Strike the Gold (March 21, 1988 – December 13, 2011) was an American Thoroughbred racehorse best known for winning the 1991 Kentucky Derby. Upon the death of 1987 Derby winner Alysheba in March 2009, Strike the Gold became the oldest living Kentucky Derby winner, until his own death in 2011.

== Background ==
He was born on Calumet Farm. He was said to have barely survived birth and was born a "dummy foal", which is a condition that creates a lack of oxygen to the brain. He was on oxygen for the first three days of his life. He was orphaned at four months when his mother, Majestic Gold, died of colic. He was said to be the fastest at the farm as a yearling. He is a son of U.S. Racing Hall of Famer Alydar. Strike the Gold was purchased in 1990 for $500,000 from breeder Calumet Farm by B. Giles Brophy, William J. Condren, and Joseph M. Cornacchia, who raced him under the name BCC Stable after Calumet Farm had financial issues.

== Racing career ==
Competing at age three in the Florida Derby, the colt finished second behind the 1990 U.S. Champion 2-Yr-Old Colt, Fly So Free, and ahead of third-place Hansel. Two weeks later in mid April, Strike the Gold won the Blue Grass Stakes. However, for the first leg of the U.S. Triple Crown, the Kentucky Derby, Hansel was the betting favorite with Fly So Free the second choice. Fly So Free finished fifth and Hansel was tenth behind winner Strike the Gold. Second place went to the still lightly regarded, but future great, Best Pal. Mane Minister finished third, as he did in all three of the Triple Crown races.

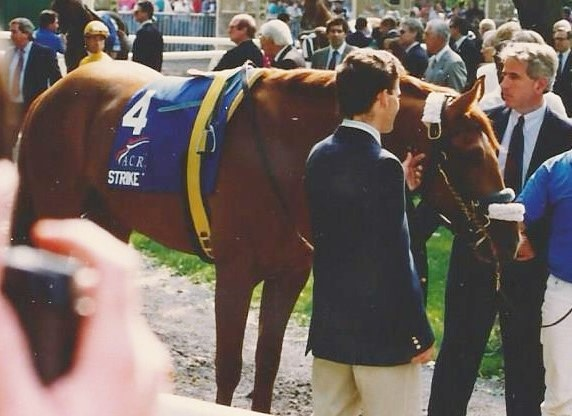
Strike the Gold in 1992

Strike the Gold finished sixth in the Preakness Stakes, which was won by Hansel. In the 1991 Belmont Stakes, Strike the Gold drew the outside post and at one point was twenty lengths behind the frontrunner. He fought back to battle Hansel in the homestretch, losing by a head to finish second. Later that year, Strike the Gold finished third in both the Jim Dandy Stakes and the Jockey Club Gold Cup. In all, after his Kentucky Derby win, Strike the Gold lost twelve straight starts, which resulted in a bitter dispute between his three owners over his handling by trainer Nick Zito.

In May 1992, the four-year-old horse was sold at auction for $2.9 million, bought by William J. Condren and Joseph M. Cornacchia, two of the original three partners. Five days after the sale, with Zito still his trainer, Strike the Gold won the Pimlico Special over Fly So Free and five other top horses. A few weeks later, he scored another victory in the Nassau County Handicap over Pleasant Tap, then the two horses reversed their finishes in the Jockey Club Gold Cup.

In 1993, Strike the Gold's best showing was a third in the Nassau County Handicap that he had won the previous year.

== Stud record ==
In mid 1993, he was retired to breeding duty at Ben P. Walden Jr.'s Vinery near Midway, Kentucky, but his progeny never met with much racing success. By 1997, his stud fee stood at only $15,000 and in 1999 he was sold to the Jockey Club of Turkey to serve as a stallion at the Turkish National Stud. There his mating with Free Trade, a daughter of Shareef Dancer, produced the 2001 colt Sabirli, who set records in Turkish sprint and mile races and earned more than US$6 million. On September 15, 2010, Sabirli died in his barn. He has a couple of foals born in 2010.

== Pedigree ==
Pedigree of Strike the Gold (GB), chestnut stallion, 1988
Sire Alydar (USA) 1975	Raise A Native (USA); 1961	Native Dancer	Polynesian
Sire Alydar (USA) 1975	Raise A Native (USA); 1961	Native Dancer	Geisha
Sire Alydar (USA) 1975	Raise A Native (USA); 1961	Raise You	Case Ace
Sire Alydar (USA) 1975	Raise A Native (USA); 1961	Raise You	Lady Glory
Sire Alydar (USA) 1975	Sweet Tooth (USA); 1965	On-and-On	Nasrullah
Sire Alydar (USA) 1975	Sweet Tooth (USA); 1965	On-and-On	Two Lea
Sire Alydar (USA) 1975	Sweet Tooth (USA); 1965	Plum Cake	Ponder
Sire Alydar (USA) 1975	Sweet Tooth (USA); 1965	Plum Cake	Real Delight
Dam Majestic Gold (USA) 1979	Hatchet Man (USA); 1971	The Axe	Mahmoud
Dam Majestic Gold (USA) 1979	Hatchet Man (USA); 1971	The Axe	Blackball
Dam Majestic Gold (USA) 1979	Hatchet Man (USA); 1971	Bebopper	Tom Fool
Dam Majestic Gold (USA) 1979	Hatchet Man (USA); 1971	Bebopper	Bebop
Dam Majestic Gold (USA) 1979	Majestic Secret (USA); 1969	Pappa Fourway	Pappageno
Dam Majestic Gold (USA) 1979	Majestic Secret (USA); 1969	Pappa Fourway	Oola Hills
Dam Majestic Gold (USA) 1979	Majestic Secret (USA); 1969	Secret Session	Your Host
Dam Majestic Gold (USA) 1979	Majestic Secret (USA); 1969	Secret Session	Bravely Go (Family: 16-c)
