= John P. Campo =

American horse trainer (1938–2005)

Personal information
- Born: February 24, 1938 East Harlem, New York, U.S.
- Died: November 14, 2005 (aged 67)
- Occupation: Trainer

Horse racing career
- Sport: Horse racing
- Career wins: 1,431

Major racing wins
- Bahamas Stakes (1971); Dwyer Stakes (1971); Long Island Handicap (1968); Remsen Stakes (1970, 1980); Santa Anita Derby (1971); Swift Stakes (1971, 1976, 1980); Wood Memorial Stakes (1971, 1981); Astoria Stakes (1972, 1980); Fashion Stakes (1972, 1976); Great American Stakes (1972, 1979); Cowdin Stakes (1973); Laurel Futurity Stakes (1973); Matron Stakes (1973); Belmont Futurity Stakes (1974); Hopeful Stakes (1975, 1979); Mother Goose Stakes (1976, 1977); Paumonok Handicap (1979); Saratoga Special Stakes (1979); Ashley T. Cole Stakes (1980); New York Breeders' Futurity (1980, 1981); Monmouth Cup (1981); Woodward Stakes (1981); Bold Ruler Handicap (1982); Morven Stakes (1982); Toboggan Handicap (1982); Lexington Stakes (1984); Flamingo Stakes (1988); Florida Oaks(1988) U.S. Triple Crown wins: Kentucky Derby (1981); Preakness Stakes (1981)

Significant horses
- Jim French, Protagonist; Talking Picture, Pleasant Colony
- Updated on May 29, 2021

John P. Campo Sr. (February 24, 1938 – November 14, 2005) was an American thoroughbred racehorse trainer.

Campo was born in East Harlem, New York and raised in Ozone Park, Queens. He is best known as the trainer of 1981 Kentucky Derby and Preakness Stakes winner Pleasant Colony. Among his other notable horses, John Campo conditioned both of 1973's 2-year-old Eclipse Award winners, the Champion 2-Year-Old Filly Talking Picture, the exceptional Jim French, and Champion 2-Year-Old Colt, Protagonist.

In January 1986, Campo suffered a devastating loss when thirty-six of his thirty-eight horses died when a fire swept through his racetrack barn at Belmont Park.

After suffering a stroke, John Campo retired in 1996. During his thirty years training horses he saddled 1,431 winners from 12,826 starters. He was living in Hewlett, New York on Long Island when he died in 2005. He is buried at Pinelawn Memorial Park in Farmingdale, New York on Long Island. His son, Paul J. Campo, is the racing secretary for the New York Racing Association. John P. Campo Jr. followed in his father's footsteps and is also a trainer.
