= 1975 in sports =

1975 in sports describes the year's events in world sport.

== Alpine skiing ==
- Alpine Skiing World Cup
  - Men's overall season champion: Gustav Thöni, Italy
  - Women's overall season champion: Annemarie Pröll, Austria

== American football ==
- January 12 − Super Bowl IX: the Pittsburgh Steelers (AFC) won 16−6 over the Minnesota Vikings (NFC)
  - Location: Tulane Stadium
  - Attendance: 80,997
  - MVP: Franco Harris, FB (Pittsburgh)
- Birmingham Vulcans win the final season of WFL competition, had best overall record when league ceased after first twelve weeks of regular season.

== Association football ==
- Brazil – Internacional wins the Campeonato Brasileiro
- England – the League Championship – Derby County took the title for the second time in four seasons, finishing two points clear of Liverpool and Ipswich Town.
- England – FA Cup – West Ham United beat Fulham 2–0 at Wembley Stadium in front of 100,000 people. Alan Taylor was the scorer of both goals.
- England – League Cup – Aston Villa beat Norwich City 1–0 at Wembley Stadium.
- European Cup – Bayern Munich defeated Leeds United 2–0 in a controversial final at the Parc des Princes, Paris.
- European Cup Winners' Cup – Dynamo Kyiv beat Ferencváros 3–0 in Basel, Switzerland.
- UEFA Cup – Borussia Mönchengladbach beat FC Twente 5–1 on aggregate, with a leg played at each team's home stadium.
- Ecuador – Ecuadorian Serie A Champions: Liga Deportiva Universitaria de Quito

== Athletics ==
- August 12 – New Zealand's John Walker set a new world record in Gothenburg, Sweden, becoming the first man to break 3:50 for the mile when he clocked 3:49.4.
- October – Athletics at the 1975 Pan American Games held in Mexico City

== Australian rules football ==
- Victorian Football League
  - North Melbourne wins the 79th VFL Premiership (North Melbourne 19.8 (122) d Hawthorn 9.13 (67))
  - Brownlow Medal awarded to Gary Dempsey (Footscray)
- South Australian National Football League:
  - August 23: Glenelg kick the all-time record score for a major Australian Rules competition, kicking 49.23 (317) to Central District's 11.13 (79).

== Baseball ==
- January 23 – Slugger Ralph Kiner is inducted into the Baseball Hall of Fame.
- September 16 – Pirates second baseman Rennie Stennett ties Wilbert Robinson's ML record, set June 10, 1892, by going 7-for-7 in a 9-inning game. He scored five of his club's runs in a 22–0 massacre of the Cubs, a major-league record for the biggest score in a shutout game in the 20th century.
- World Series – Cincinnati Reds win 4 games to 3 over the Boston Red Sox. Often described as one of the most memorable of all World Series.

== Basketball ==
- April 9 – Asia's first professional basketball league, the Philippine Basketball Association played its first game at the Araneta Coliseum.
- Darryl Dawkins becomes the first NBA player drafted out of high school.
- NCAA Division I Men's Basketball Championship –
  - UCLA wins 92–85 over Kentucky in John Wooden's final game as Bruins coach.
- NBA Finals –
  - Golden State Warriors win 4 games to 0 over the Washington Bullets
- 1975 ABA Finals –
  - Kentucky Colonels defeat Indiana Pacers 4 games to 1

== Boxing ==
- October 1 in Manila, Philippines Muhammad Ali defeated Joe Frazier to maintain the Heavyweight Championship of the world. Known as the Thrilla In Manila, many regard it as the greatest fight in boxing history.

== Canadian football ==
- Grey Cup – Edmonton Eskimos won 9–8 over the Montreal Alouettes
- Vanier Cup – Ottawa Gee-Gees won 14–9 over the Calgary Dinos

== Cricket ==
- 1975 Cricket World Cup, the first to be held. West Indies beat Australia by 17 runs.

== Cycling ==
- Giro d'Italia won by Fausto Bertoglio of Italy
- Tour de France – Bernard Thévenet of France
- UCI Road World Championships – Men's road race – Hennie Kuiper of Netherlands

== Disc sports ==
- The first disc ultimate games in Canada are played as exhibition games at the Canadian Open Frisbee Championships on Toronto Islands.
- Ultimate is played as an exhibition of a new sport at the World Frisbee Championships (WFC) at the Rose Bowl in Pasadena, California.

== Dogsled racing ==
- Iditarod Trail Sled Dog Race Champion –
  - Emmitt Peters won with lead dogs: Nugget & Digger

== Field hockey ==
- Men's World Cup held in Kuala Lumpur and won by India
- 1975 Pan American Games men's competition held in Mexico City and won by Argentina

== Figure skating ==
- World Figure Skating Championships –
  - Men's champion: Sergey Nikolayevich Volkov, Soviet Union
  - Ladies' champion: Dianne de Leeuw, Netherlands
  - Pair skating champions: Irina Rodnina & Alexander Zaitsev, Soviet Union
  - Ice dancing champions: Irina Moiseyeva & Andrei Minenkov, Soviet Union

== Golf ==
Men's professional

- Masters Tournament – Jack Nicklaus
- U.S. Open – Lou Graham
- Western Open - Hale Irwin (Trevino struck by lightning)
- British Open – Tom Watson
- PGA Championship – Jack Nicklaus
- PGA Tour money leader – Jack Nicklaus – $298,149
- Ryder Cup – United States wins 21–11 over Britain & Ireland in team golf.

Men's amateur

- British Amateur – Vinny Giles
- U.S. Amateur – Fred Ridley

Women's professional

- LPGA Championship – Kathy Whitworth
- U.S. Women's Open – Sandra Palmer
- LPGA Tour money leader – Sandra Palmer – $76,374

== Harness racing ==
- United States Pacing Triple Crown races –
  1. Cane Pace – Nero
  2. Little Brown Jug – Seatrain
  3. Messenger Stakes – Bret's Champ
- United States Trotting Triple Crown races –
  1. Hambletonian – Bonefish
  2. Yonkers Trot – Surefire Hanover
  3. Kentucky Futurity – Noble Rogue
- Australian Inter Dominion Harness Racing Championship –
  - Pacers: Young Quinn

== Horse racing ==
- July 6 – In what was billed as the "Battle of the Sexes", Kentucky Derby winner, Foolish Pleasure went head to head in a match race against the undefeated filly, Ruffian. In the lead, Ruffian broke a leg and, after an unsuccessful operation to save her, the horse widely believed to have been the greatest thoroughbred filly ever was humanely put down.

Steeplechases

- Cheltenham Gold Cup – Ten Up
- Grand National – L'Escargot

Flat races

- Australia – Melbourne Cup won by Think Big
- Canada – Queen's Plate won by L'Enjoleur
- France – Prix de l'Arc de Triomphe won by Star Appeal
- Ireland – Irish Derby Stakes won by Grundy
- English Triple Crown Races:
  1. 2,000 Guineas Stakes – Bolkonski
  2. The Derby – Grundy
  3. St. Leger Stakes – Bruni
- United States Triple Crown Races:
  1. Kentucky Derby – Foolish Pleasure
  2. Preakness Stakes – Master Derby
  3. Belmont Stakes – Avatar

== Ice hockey ==
- Art Ross Trophy as the NHL's leading scorer during the regular season: Bobby Orr, Boston Bruins.
- Hart Memorial Trophy for the NHL's Most Valuable Player: Bobby Clarke, Philadelphia Flyers
- Stanley Cup – Philadelphia Flyers defeat the Buffalo Sabres 4 games to 2
- World Hockey Championship –
  - Men's champion: Soviet Union defeated Czechoslovakia
- Avco World Trophy – Houston Aeros win 4 games to 0 over the Quebec Nordiques
- SM-liiga, the Finnish professional ice hockey league, launched its first season 1975–1976
- NCAA Men's Ice Hockey Championship – Michigan Technological University Huskies defeat University of Minnesota-Twin Cities Golden Gophers 6–1 in St. Louis, Missouri

== Lacrosse ==
- The National Lacrosse League of 1974 and 1975 play their 2nd and last season.
- The Quebec Caribous defeat the Montreal Québécois 4 games to 2 to win the National Lacrosse League (1974–75) Championship.
- The Vancouver Burrards win the Mann Cup.
- The Windsor Warlocks win the Founders Cup.
- The Peterborough Gray Munros win the Minto Cup.

== Orienteering ==
- First Ski Orienteering World Championships held in Hyvinkää, Finland.

== Rugby league ==
- 1975 Amco Cup
- 1975 European Rugby League Championship
- 1975 New Zealand rugby league season
- 1975 NSWRFL season
- 1975 Pacific Cup
- 1974–75 Northern Rugby Football League season / 1975–76 Northern Rugby Football League season
- 1975 Rugby League World Cup

== Rugby union ==
- 81st Five Nations Championship series is won by Wales

== Snooker ==
- World Snooker Championship – Ray Reardon beats Eddie Charlton 31–30

== Swimming ==
- The second FINA World Championships held in Cali, Colombia

== Tennis ==
- Grand Slam in tennis men's results:
  1. Australian Open – John Newcombe
  2. French Open – Björn Borg
  3. Wimbledon championships – Arthur Ashe
  4. U.S. Open – Manuel Orantes
- Grand Slam in tennis women's results:
  1. Australian Open – Evonne Goolagong
  2. French Open – Chris Evert
  3. Wimbledon championships – Billie Jean King
  4. U.S. Open – Chris Evert
- Davis Cup – Sweden wins 3–2 over Czechoslovakia in world tennis.
- Eighteen-year-old Martina Navratilova of Czechoslovakia announces her defection to the United States

== Volleyball ==
- Asian Men's Volleyball Championship held in Melbourne: won by Japan
- Asian Women's Volleyball Championship held in Melbourne: won by Japan
- Men and Women's European Volleyball Championship held in Yugoslavia: men's and women's tournaments both won by USSR
- Volleyball at the 1975 Pan American Games held in Mexico City: men's and women's tournaments both won by Cuba

== Water polo ==
- 1975 FINA Men's World Water Polo Championship held in Cali, Colombia, and won by USSR.

== General sporting events ==
- Seventh Pan American Games held in Mexico City, Mexico
- Seventh Mediterranean Games held in Algiers, Algeria
- Eighth Summer Universiade held in Rome, Italy
- Eighth Winter Universiade held in Livigno, Italy

== Awards ==
- Associated Press Male Athlete of the Year – Fred Lynn, Major League Baseball
- Associated Press Female Athlete of the Year – Chris Evert, Tennis
