= Stepping Stone Purse =

- Class: Discontinued horse
- Location: Churchill Downs; Louisville, Kentucky, United States
- Inaugurated: 1958
- Race type: Thoroughbred – Flat racing

Race information
- Distance: 7 furlongs (1958–1976); 8 furlongs (1977–1981)
- Surface: Dirt
- Track: Left-handed
- Qualification: Three years old
- Weight: Assigned

The Stepping Stone Purse was an American Thoroughbred horse race held annually in the latter part of April at Churchill Downs in Louisville, Kentucky. Open to three-year-old horses, it was, along with the Derby Trial Stakes, one of two final prep races hosted by Churchill Downs running up to the Kentucky Derby.

In 1959, Sword Dancer won the Stepping Stone Purse, then ran second in the Kentucky Derby before winning the Belmont Stakes. The following year, Bally Ache won this race then ran second in the Derby but won the Preakness Stakes. In 1969, future U.S. Racing Hall of Fame inductee Majestic Prince won this race by six lengths while setting a new stakes record and then won the Kentucky Derby and the Preakness Stakes. In 1974, Cannonade too won the Stepping Stone Purse and the Kentucky Derby and 1965 winner Tom Rolfe went on to finish third in the Derby but then won the Preakness Stakes.

== Records ==
Speed record

- 1:21.60 – Majestic Prince (1969) (at 7 furlongs)
- 1:37.40 – Nostalgia (1977) (at 8 furlongs)

Most wins by a jockey

- 2 – Bill Shoemaker (1959, 1966)
- 2 – Ismael Valenzuela (1962, 1964)
- 2 – Manuel Ycaza (1963, 1968)

Most wins by a trainer

- 2 – Woody Stephens (1963, 1974)

Most wins by an owner

- 2 – Cain Hoy Stable (1963, 1968)

== Winners ==
Year	Winner	Jockey	Trainer	Owner	Time
1981	Mythical Ruler	Kevin Wirth	Fred Wirth	Al Risen Jr. & Paxton Price	1:37.80
1980	Jaklin Klugman	Darrel McHargue	Riley S. Cofer	Jack Klugman & John Dominguez	1:38.60
1979	King Celebrity	Don Brumfield	Robert J. Taylor	Che-Bar Stable	1:37.80
1978	Batonnier	Ronald Hardes	Harry Trotsek	Edward Seltzer	1:37.60
1977	Nostalgia	Larry Snyder	Del W. Carroll	William S. Farish III	1:37.40
1976	Amano	Larry Melancon	James A. Padgett	James C. Irvin	1:24.80
1975	Greek Answer	Mickey Solomone	Frank H. Merrill Jr.	W. Preston Gilbride	1:25.00
1974	Cannonade	Ángel Cordero Jr.	Woody Stephens	John M. Olin	1:23.80
1973	Shecky Greene	Walter Blum	Lou M. Goldfine	Joseph Kellman	1:23.00
1972	Hold Your Peace	Carlos Marquez	Arnold N. Winick	Maribel Blum	1:24.00
1971	Bold And Able	Howard Grant	Reggie Cornell	Calumet Farm	1:22.60
1970	My Dad George	Ray Broussard	Frank J. McManus	Raymond M. Curtis	1:23.60
1969	Majestic Prince	Bill Hartack	Johnny Longden	Frank M. McMahon	1:21.60
1968	Captain's Gig	Manuel Ycaza	William W. Stephens	Cain Hoy Stable	1:22.60
1967	Ruken	Fernando Alvarez	Clyde Turk	Louis R. Rowan	1:23.20
1966	Old Bag	Bill Shoemaker	Stanley M. Reiser	P. & R. Schleicher & S. M. Reiser	1:25.20
1965	Tom Rolfe	Ron Turcotte	Frank Y. Whiteley Jr.	Powhatan Stable	1:22.80
1964	Mr. Brick	Ismael Valenzuela	James E. Picou	Roy Sturgis	1:22.80
1963	Never Bend	Manuel Ycaza	Woody Stephens	Cain Hoy Stable	1:22.40
1962	Sir Gaylord	Ismael Valenzuela	Casey Hayes	Christopher Chenery	1:22.40
1961	Light Talk	Robert Nono	Steve Ippolito	Jacnot Stable	1:23.40
1960	Bally Ache	Bobby Ussery	Jimmy Pitt	Edgehill Farm	1:22.60
1959	Sword Dancer	Bill Shoemaker	J. Elliott Burch	Brookmeade Stable	1:22.20
1958	Belleau Chief	Johnny Heckmann	E. B. Carpenter	Lora Birr	1:22.80
