= 1975 Kentucky Derby =

Horse race

101st Kentucky Derby
- Kentucky Derby
- Grade I stakes race
- Location: Churchill Downs
- Date: May 3, 1975
- Winning horse: Foolish Pleasure
- Jockey: Jacinto Vásquez
- Trainer: LeRoy Jolley
- Owner: John L. Greer
- Conditions: Fast
- Surface: Dirt
- Attendance: 113,324

The 1975 Kentucky Derby was the 101st running of the Kentucky Derby. The race took place on May 3, 1975, with 113,324 people in attendance.

== Full results ==
Finished	Post	Horse	Jockey	Trainer	Owner	Time / behind
1st	4	Foolish Pleasure	Jacinto Vásquez	LeRoy Jolley	John L. Greer	
2nd	7	Avatar	Bill Shoemaker	Tommy Doyle	Arthur A Seeligson Jr	
3rd	10	Diablo	Laffit Pincay Jr	Sidney Martin	Frank M. McMahon	
4th	5	Master Derby	Darrel McHargue	Smiley Adams	Golden Chance Farm (Robert E. Lehmann)	
5th	2	Media	Jean Cruguet	John P. Campo	Elmendorf Farm	
6th	1	Prince Thou Art	Braulio Baeza	Lou Rondinello	Darby Dan Farm	
7th	11	Promised City	David Whited	Larry Spraker	Big I Farm (Robert Clayton)	
8th	6	Bold Chapeau	C. Joseph Alleman	Fred A. Wyble	Tom A. Isbell, et al.	
9th	1A	Sylvan Place	Angel Cordero Jr.	Lou Rondinello	Darby Dan Farm	
10th	13f	Fashion Sale	William Gavidia	Thomas W. Kelley	Clarence Benjamin	
11th	9	Round Stake	Michael Hole	H. Allen Jerkens	Hobeau Farm	
12th	14f	Gatch	Julio C. Espinoza	Antonio Eskildsen	Pedro A. Diaz	
13th	3	Honey Mark	Eddie Delahoussaye	Larry R. Robideaux Jr.	Mr. & Mrs. Robert F. Roberts	
14th	12f	Rushing Man	James McKnight	David Logsdon	John W. Mecom	
15th	8	Bombay Duck	Menotti Aristone	Benjamin W. Perkins Sr.	Ronald Aristone Sr.	
