= Fernando Alvarez (jockey) =

Chilean-American jockey and horse trainer (1937–1999)

Personal information
- Born: August 30, 1937 Santiago, Chile
- Died: June 27, 1999 (aged 61)
- Occupation: Jockey

Horse racing career
- Sport: Horse racing
- Career wins: Not found

Major racing wins
- American Derby (1964); Discovery Handicap (1964); Gallorette Handicap (1964); Tidal Handicap (1964); Jersey Derby (1964); Santa Maria Handicap (1965); Del Mar Futurity (1966); Palomar Handicap (1966); Display Handicap (1967); Santa Anita Derby (1967); Stepping Stone Purse (1967); Del Mar Derby (1969); Jack Goodman Stakes (1969); Charles H. Strub Stakes (1969); Speakeasy Stakes (1969); San Juan Capistrano Handicap (1970); Santa Anita Handicap (1970); Oak Leaf Stakes (1971); Osunitas Handicap (1971); San Luis Rey Handicap (1971); Bing Crosby Handicap (1972); San Diego Handicap (1972); Arlington Matron Stakes (1973); San Luis Obispo Handicap (1974); Ladies Handicap (1975); San Gorgonio Handicap (1976)

Significant horses
- Figonero, Quicken Tree, Roman Brother, Ruken

Fernando Alvarez (Spanish pronunciation: [feɾˈnando ˈalβaɾeθ]; August 30, 1937 – June 27, 1999) was an American Thoroughbred horse racing jockey and trainer who rode winners from coast to coast including in the two most important races in California.

A native of Santiago, Chile, Alvarez began riding there at age sixteen, winning with his very first mount. The following year he went to Panama where he rode for seven years before emigrating to the United States.

In 1964 Fernando Alvarez rode Roman Brother to a second-place finish in the third leg of the U.S. Triple Crown series, the Belmont Stakes. He then won with the colt in the American Derby and Discovery Handicap. Alvarez's most significant wins came at Santa Anita Park for Louis R. Rowan, co-founder of the Oak Tree Racing Association. Aboard Ruken, he won the 1967 Santa Anita Derby and on Quicken Tree, the 1970 Santa Anita Handicap. Alvarez followed up on his victories in the Santa Anita Derby and the Stepping Stone Purse at Churchill Downs that gave him his first ever mount in the Kentucky Derby in which he finished eighth.

After retiring from riding at the end of 1976, Fernando Alvarez turned to training for a time and on March 27, 1977, earned his first win at Santa Anita Park.

Fernando Alvarez died on June 27, 1999, at age sixty-one. He was living in Azusa, California, at the time of his death. His son, Fernando Alvarez Jr., also became a trainer.
