= 1975 Preakness Stakes =

100th running of the Preakness Stakes

100th Preakness Stakes
- The Preakness Stakes
- Location: Pimlico Race Course, Baltimore, Maryland, United States
- Date: May 17, 1975
- Winning horse: Master Derby
- Jockey: Darrel McHargue
- Conditions: Fast
- Surface: Dirt

The 1975 Preakness Stakes was the 100th running of the $210,000 Grade 1 Preakness Stakes thoroughbred horse race. The race took place on May 17, 1975, and was televised in the United States on the CBS television network. Master Derby, who was jockeyed by Darrel McHargue, won the race by one length over runner-up Foolish Pleasure. Approximate post time was 5:40 p.m. Eastern Time. The race was run on a fast track in a final time of 1:56-2/5. The Maryland Jockey Club reported total attendance of 75,216, this is recorded as second highest on the list of American thoroughbred racing top attended events for North America in 1975.

== Payout ==
The 100th Preakness Stakes Payout Schedule

Program Number	Horse Name	Win	Place	Show
4	Master Derby	US$48.80	$16.00	$7.20
5	Foolish Pleasure	-	$3.20	$2.60
8	Diabolo	–	–	$4.60

$2 Exacta: (4–5) paid $111.60

== The full chart ==
Finish Position	Margin (lengths)	Post Position	Horse name	Jockey	Trainer	Owner	Post Time Odds	Purse Earnings
1st	0	4	Master Derby	Darrel McHargue	Smiley Adams	Golden Chance Farm (Robert E. Lehmann)	23.40-1	$158,100
2nd	1	5	Foolish Pleasure	Jacinto Vásquez	LeRoy Jolley	John L. Greer	1.20-1 favorite	$30,000
3rd	2	8	Diabolo	Laffit Pincay, Jr.	Sidney Martin	Frank M. McMahon	9.50-1	$15,000
4th	31/2	2	Prince Thou Art	Braulio Baeza	Lou Rondinello	Darby Dan Farm	15.80-1	$7,500
5th	43/4	9	Avatar	Bill Shoemaker	A. Thomas Doyle	Arthur A. Seeligson Jr.	4.30-1	
6th	51/4	7	Singh	Ángel Cordero Jr.	John W. Russell	Cynthia Phipps	4.80-1	
7th	91/4	6	Native Guest	Sandy Hawley	Robert J. Frankel	Goldmills Farm (William A. Levin)	6.70-1	
8th	123/4	3	Bold Chapeau	C. Joseph Alleman	Fred A. Wyble	Tom A. Isbell, et al.	72.00-1	
9th	223/4	1A	Just the Time	Ron Turcotte	John P. Campo	Buckland Farm	27.40-1	
10th	323/4	1	Media	Jorge Velásquez	John P. Campo	Elmendorf Farm	27.40-1	

- Winning Breeder: Robert E. Lehmann; (KY)
- Winning Time: 1:56 2/5
- Track Condition: Fast
- Total Attendance: 75,216
