= Clyde Turk =

American jockey and trainer

Personal information
- Born: November 15, 1907 United States
- Died: April 24, 1995 (aged 87)
- Occupation: Jockey / Trainer

Horse racing career
- Sport: Horse racing

Major racing wins
- Wins as a jockey: Monterey Purse (1932); Walnut Creek Handicap (1933); San Felipe Stakes (1935); Santa Margarita Handicap (1935); Au Revoir Handicap (1942); San Simeon Handicap (1943) Wins as a trainer: Oceanside Handicap (1955); Cinderella Stakes (1959); Del Mar Oaks (1960); Las Flores Handicap (1960); Escondido Handicap (1961, 1962, 1966); Ramona Handicap (1961); Sequoia Handicap (1961, 1963, 1964); Milady Handicap (1962); Santa Margarita Handicap (1962, 1964, 1965); Vanity Handicap (1962); Santa Maria Handicap (1963, 1964); Del Mar Futurity (1965, 1966); Display Handicap (1967, 1969); Inglewood Handicap (1967); Rancho Bernardo Handicap (1967); Santa Anita Derby (1967); Del Mar Handicap (1968); Jockey Club Gold Cup (1968); Manhattan Handicap (1968); San Luis Rey Handicap (1968); San Luis Obispo Handicap (1969)

Significant horses
- Jockey: Double Jay, Ted Clark; Trainer: Curious Clover, Linita, Quicken Tree, Ruken, Top Double

Clyde Turk (November 15, 1907 – April 24, 1995) was an American jockey and trainer of thoroughbred racehorses. He began riding horses in the 1920s and in 1929 was riding at the new Agua Caliente Racetrack in Tijuana, Mexico. He competed at tracks throughout California and at the newly built Santa Anita Racetrack in Arcadia, California he rode the first-ever winner for trainer Noble Threewitt during the opening season in which he would also win important races such as the San Felipe Stakes and Santa Margarita Handicap, the latter a race he would win three more times as a trainer.

In 1946, Turk retired from riding and turned to training thoroughbreds as a career.

== 1967 Kentucky Derby ==
For owner Louis R. Rowan, Clyde Turk trained Ruken to a win in the 1967 Santa Anita Derby, the most important event for three-year-olds in California. At Churchill Downs they then won the Stepping Stone Purse which prompted bettors to make him their third choice for the Kentucky Derby in which he would finish eighth.

Clyde Turk retired from racing on March 31, 1970. He was living in Yuba City, California at the time of his death at age 87 in 1995.
