= Howard Grant (jockey) =

American jockey (c.1939–2018)

Personal information
- Born: c. 1939 Cincinnati, Ohio, United States
- Died: August 1, 2018 (aged 79)
- Occupation: Jockey

Horse racing career
- Sport: Horse racing
- Career wins: not found

Major racing wins
- Lamplighter Stakes (1957, 1964); Bahamas Stakes (1958); Narragansett Special (1958); Top Flight Handicap (1958, 1964); Washington, D.C. International Stakes (1958); Miss Woodford Stakes (1959, 1961); Sorority Stakes (1959); Jasmine Stakes (1960); Beldame Stakes (1961); Delaware Handicap (1961); Molly Pitcher Stakes (1961, 1965); Ladies Handicap (1962); Monmouth Oaks (1963, 1964); Alabama Stakes (1964); Carter Handicap (1964); Coaching Club American Oaks (1964); Delaware Oaks (1964); Man o' War Stakes (1964); Paumonok Handicap (1964); Vosburgh Stakes (1964); Longfellow Handicap (1965); Spinster Stakes (1967); Vineland Handicap (1967); Autumn Days Handicap (1971); Carleton F. Burke Handicap (1971); Del Mar Derby (1971); Derby Trial Stakes (1971); Palos Verdes Handicap (1971); Volante Handicap (1971); San Simeon Handicap (1972); Graduation Stakes (1972); Speakeasy Stakes (1972); Sunny Slope Stakes (1972); Inglewood Handicap (1974); Yellow Ribbon Stakes (1977)

Racing awards
- Gulfstream Park Champion jockey (1963); Del Mar Champion jockey (1971); Oak Tree Champion jockey (1971)

Significant horses
- Affectionately, Airmans Guide, Ancient Title, Lamb Chop, Miss Cavandish, Primonetta, Sailor's Guide

Howard Douglas Grant (c. 1939 – August 1, 2018) was an American Thoroughbred horse racing jockey. Born in Cincinnati, Ohio, he began his jockey apprenticeship as a seventeen-year-old at Wheeling Downs, West Virginia and won his first race on October 9, 1956, at Cranwood Park Race Course in Cleveland, Ohio. During his twenty-four-year career, he competed primarily at Middle Atlantic racetracks and in 1959 rode four winners on a single racecard at Bowie Race Track, repeating that feat again in 1968 at the Atlantic City Race Course. He died August 1, 2018, aged 79.

== Riding titles ==
Grant won the Gulfstream Park riding title in 1963. In the early 1970s he began riding in California where he won an Oak Tree Racing Association and a Del Mar racetrack riding championship in 1971.

Like many jockeys, Howard Grant battled weight gain from early in his career, and by the middle part of the 1970s the problem frequently limited his number of mounts.
