= John G. Canty =

John Canty
Personal information
- Born: January 30, 1917 Ireland
- Died: January 7, 1992 (aged 74) Huntington Memorial Hospital, Pasadena, CA, USA
- Occupation: Trainer

Horse racing career
- Sport: Horse racing
- Career wins: Not found

Major racing wins
- Bing Crosby Handicap (1962); Del Mar Handicap (1962); Ramona Handicap (1965, 1971, 1972); Junior Miss Stakes (1967); Las Flores Handicap (1968); Palomar Handicap (1969, 1971); Honeymoon Stakes (1970); Oceanside Handicap (1970); Lakes And Flowers Handicap (1970); California Breeders' Champion Stakes (1971); California Derby (1971); Del Mar Futurity (1971); Haggin Stakes (1971); Hollywood Juvenile Championship Stakes (1971); Milady Handicap (1971); San Felipe Handicap (1971); Santa Catalina Stakes (1971); Autumn Days Handicap (1972); Charles H. Strub Stakes (1972, 1973); San Antonio Handicap (1972); San Luis Rey Handicap (1972); Santa Ana Handicap (1972); San Diego Handicap (1977); Santa Anita Oaks (1979)

Significant horses
- Unconscious, Street Dancer, Royal Owl

John G. Canty (January 30, 1917 - January 7, 1992) was an American Thoroughbred horse racing trainer.

A native of Ireland, he came from a dynasty of Curragh racehorse trainers, including his father James (Jimmy) Canty, his maternal grandfather Philip (Philly) Behan and a great-grandfather Dan Broderick of Mountjoy Lodge. Other trainers in the extended family included his brother Phil Canty, their uncle Joe Canty (also for many decades Ireland's most successful jockey by lifetime wins) and Joe's son Joseph M. Canty.

Originally a jockey, John served his apprenticeship with R. C. Dawson in England and later rode for his father's Curragh stable.

He emigrated to the United States in 1953 and settled in California. After working in the horse racing industry, in 1959 he became a professional trainer. During his thirty-three year career, John Canty's best known horse was Unconscious, a colt owned by Arthur A. Seeligson Jr. Unconscious notably won the San Felipe Handicap, San Antonio Handicap, California Derby, Santa Catalina Stakes, and the Charles H. Strub Stakes and was the betting favorite in the 1971 Kentucky Derby in which he ran fifth.

John Canty was a partner with Castlebrook Farm in the horse Nor II who he conditioned to win the 1972 San Luis Rey Handicap.

A resident of Arcadia, California, John Canty died of pneumonia at age seventy-four at Huntington Memorial Hospital in Pasadena.
