= Street Dance =

Street dance, formally known as vernacular dance, refers to dance styles that evolved outside of dance studios in any available open space.

Street dance, Street Dance or StreetDance may also refer to:

- StreetDance 3D, a British dance film also known as StreetDance in its non-3D version
- Street Dance (song), a 1984 hit single by the American hip hop act Break Machine
- "Street dancing", a Philippine English term for parades in the festivals in the Philippines with dancers in elaborate costumes

== See also ==
- "Street Dancer", 2011 single by Avicii
- Street Dancer (film), 2020 Indian Hindi-language dance drama film
