= Yellow Ribbon Handicap =

- Class: Grade II
- Location: Del Mar Racetrack; Del Mar, California, United States
- Inaugurated: 1945
- Race type: Thoroughbred – Flat racing
- Website: www.dmtc.com

Race information
- Distance: 1 1/16 miles (8.5 furlongs)
- Surface: Turf
- Track: Left-handed
- Qualification: Fillies & Mares, three-years-old & up
- Weight: Assigned
- Purse: US$200,000 (since 2014)

The Yellow Ribbon Handicap (formerly known as the Palomar Handicap) is an American Thoroughbred horse race held annually at Del Mar Racetrack in Del Mar, California. The Grade II race is run on turf at a distance of one and one-sixteenth miles (8.5 furlongs) and is open to fillies and mares, age three and up.

The Palomar Handicap was first run in 1945 as a six furlong race on dirt for three-year-olds. It was not run again until 1952 when it was made an event for three-year-old fillies. After being put on hiatus again, it became an annual event in 1955. Since 1970, it has been contested on turf. From its inception, the race has been contested at various distances:

- 6 furlongs : 1945–1969
- 7.5 furlongs : 1970–1976
- 8 furlongs (1 mile) – 1977–1987
- 8.5 furlongs (1 1/16 miles) : 1988–present

It was raced in two divisions in 1970, 1971, 1973, 1982, and 1991.

This race is now called the Yellow Ribbon Handicap. (The original Yellow Ribbon Stakes run during the Oak Tree Racing Association Meeting is now called the Rodeo Drive Stakes.)

== Records ==
Speed record: (at current distance of 8.5 furlongs)

- 1:39.67 – Mea Domina (2006)

Most wins:

- 2 – Tranquility Lake (2000, 2001)
- 2 – Gotta Have Her (2009, 2010)
- 2 – She's Not Here (2015, 2016)
- 2 – Cambodia (2017,2018)

Most wins by an owner:

- 3 – Juddmonte Farms (1992, 2004, 2005)

Most wins by a jockey:

- 5 – Bill Shoemaker (1952, 1971, 1973, 1979, 1982)

Most wins by a trainer:

- 8 – Robert J. Frankel (1986, 1988, 1991, 1994, 1999, 2004, 2005, 2007)
- 7 – Charles Wittingham (1973, 1974, 1979, 1980, 1981, 1982, 1989)

== Winners ==
Year	Winner	Age	Jockey	Trainer	Owner	Time
2026	Warming	4	Juan J. Hernandez	H. Graham Motion	Eclipse Thoroughbred Partners	1:42.35
2025	Heredia (GB)	6	Juan Hernandez	H. Graham Motion	Wathnan Racing	1:42.92
2024	Anisette (GB)	4	Umberto Rispoli	Leonard Powell	Eclipse Thoroughbred Partners	1:40.94
2023	Closing Remarks	5	Umberto Rispoli	Carla Gaines	Harris Farms	1:42.01
2022	Going Global	4	Umberto Rispoli	Philip D'Amato	CYBT, Saul Gevertz et al.	1:41.18
2021	Princess Grace	4	Kent Desormeaux	Michael Stidham	John and Susan Moore	1:40.84
2020	Bodhicitta	4	Flavien Prat	Richard Baltas	Calvin Nguyen	1:42.83
2019	Beau Recall	5	Drayden Van Dyke	Brad H. Cox	Slam Dunk Racing & Medallion Racing	1:41.23
2018	Cambodia	6	Drayden Van Dyke	Thomas F. Proctor	Winter Quarter Farm	1:40.51
2017	Cambodia	5	Drayden Van Dyke	Thomas F. Proctor	Winter Quarter Farm	1:40.86
2016	She's Not Here	5	Drayden Van Dyke	Victoria H. Oliver	Humphrey/St. George Farm	1:42.70
2015	She's Not Here	4	Mike E. Smith	Victoria H. Oliver	Humphrey/St. George Farm	1:41.86
2014	Miss Serendipity	6	Brice Blanc	Ron McAnally	Anselmo Cavalieri	1:40.98
2013	Egg Drop	4	Martin Garcia	Mike R. Mitchell	Little Red Feather Racing	1:40.50
2012	Halo Dolly	4	Joe Talamo	Jerry Hollendorfer	Hoefflin/Hollendorfer/Todaro/et al.	1:40.52
2011	City to City	4	Garrett Gomez	Jerry Hollendorfer	Hollendorfer/DeBurgh/Dedominico	1:41.58
2010	Gotta Have Her	6	Mike E. Smith	Jenine Sahadi	Green Lantern Stable	1:42.39
2009	Gotta Have Her	5	Tyler Baze	Jenine Sahadi	Green Lantern Stables	1:40.67
2008	Vacare	5	Corey Nakatani	Christophe Clement	Jon & Sarah Kelly	1:40.64
2007	Precious Kitten	4	Julien Leparoux	Robert J. Frankel	Ken & Sarah Ramsey	1:40.42
2006	Mea Domina	5	Tyler Baze	Ron McAnally	Janis R. Whitham	1:39.67
2005	Intercontinental	5	Jerry D. Bailey	Robert J. Frankel	Juddmonte Farms	1:39.84
2004	Etoile Montante	4	Jose Valdivia Jr.	Robert J. Frankel	Juddmonte Farms	1:40.59
2003	Spring Star	4	Alex Solis	Richard E. Mandella	Wertheimer Farm	1:40.78
2002	Voodoo Dancer	4	Kent Desormeaux	Christophe Clement	Green Hills Farm	1:41.56
2001	Tranquility Lake	6	Eddie Delahoussaye	Julio C. Canani	Pam & Martin Wygod	1:41.94
2000	Tranquility Lake	5	Eddie Delahoussaye	Julio C. Canani	Pam & Martin Wygod	1:41.01
1999	Happyanunoit	4	Brice Blanc	Robert J. Frankel	Amerman Racing Stables	1:41.20
1998	Tuzla	4	Corey Nakatani	Julio C. Canani	David Milch	1:42.20
1997	Blushing Heiress	5	Chris McCarron	Dan L. Hendricks	M.F. & T.M. Cavanagh	1:43.20
1996	Yearly Tour	5	Chris McCarron	David Hofmans	Golden Eagle Farm	1:42.40
1995	Morgana	4	Gary Stevens	Gary F. Jones	Robert E. Sangster	1:42.40
1994	Shir Dar	4	Corey Nakatani	Robert J. Frankel	Edmund A. Gann	1:42.80
1993	Heart of Joy	6	David Flores	Gary F. Jones	Golden Eagle Farm	1:42.00
1992	Super Staff	4	Chris McCarron	Ron McAnally	Juddmonte Farms	1:42.20
1991	Guiza	4	Gary Stevens	Robert J. Frankel	Blue Vista Inc.	1:42.00
1991	Somethingmerry	4	Laffit Pincay Jr.	Donald Warren	E. W. "Bud" Johnston family	1:41.80
1990	Jabalina Brown	5	Julio A. Garcia	Ron McAnally	Haras Rosa Del Sur	1:42.60
1989	Claire Marine	4	Robbie Davis	Charles Wittingham	S. L. Port & C. E. Whittingham	1:43.20
1988	Chapel of Dreams	4	Eddie Delahoussaye	Robert J. Frankel	Ted M. Sabarese	1:42.60
1987	Festivity	4	Alex Solis	Laz Barrera	Harbor View Farm	1:35.80
1986	Aberuschka	4	Pat Valenzuela	Robert J. Frankel	Ann & Jerry Moss	1:34.40
1985	Capichi	5	Russell Baze	Gary F. Jones	3 Plus U Stable	1:35.20
1984	Moment to Buy †	3	Tommy Chapman	Olen Battles	Paul Painter	1:35.20
1983	Triple Tipple	4	Chris McCarron	Richard L. Cross	Fittocks Stud	1:35.60
1982	Northern Fable	4	Sandy Hawley	Charles Wittingham	Mike G. Rutherford	1:35.20
1982	Star Pastures	4	Bill Shoemaker	John Gosden	Robert E. Sangster	1:35.40
1981	Kilijaro	5	Marco Castaneda	Charles Wittingham	Serge Fradkoff & E. A. Seltzer	1:35.40
1980	A Thousand Stars	5	Eddie Delahoussaye	Charles Wittingham	Alan Clore	1:34.80
1979	More So	4	Bill Shoemaker	Charles Wittingham	Nelson Bunker Hunt	1:35.40
1978	Drama Critic	4	Donald Pierce	Ron McAnally	Elmendorf	1:36.40
1977	Dancing Femme	4	Donald Pierce	Tommy Doyle	Jack L. Finley	1:35.60
1976	Just a Kick	4	Laffit Pincay Jr.	Roger E. Clapp	Connie M. Ring	1:29.40
1975	Modus Vivendi	4	Fernando Toro	Gordon C. Campbell	Bernard J. Ridder	1:28.80
1974	Sphere	4	Steve Valdez	Charles Wittingham	Claiborne Farm (Lessee)	1:28.40
1973	Meilleur	3	Donald Pierce	John H. Adams	El Peco Ranch	1:28.80
1973	Belle Marie	3	Bill Shoemaker	Charles Wittingham	Kinship Stable	1:28.80
1972	Minstrel Miss	5	Donald Pierce	Gordon C. Campbell	Jack M. Grossman	1:28.40
1971	Street Dancer	4	Bill Shoemaker	John G. Canty	William T. Brady	1:29.20
1971	Opening Bid	4	Jerry Lambert	Lou Glauburg	M/M John J. Elmore	1:29.80
1970	Lynne's Orphan	4	Dennis Tierney	Linwood J. Brooks	Lester Eaton & Winston W. Kratz	1:29.60
1970	La Sevillana	4	Álvaro Pineda	Warren Stute	Bent Tree Ranch	1:29.20
1969	Time to Leave	4	Danny Velasquez	John G. Canty	Neil S. McCarthy	1:08.20
1968	Pacific Cross	4	Johnny Sellers	Clyde Conway	M/M John J. Elmore	1:09.00
1967	Admirably	5	Jerry Lambert	Lou Glauburg	E. J. Anderson	1:08.60
1966	Fleet Treat	3	Fernando Alvarez	Jimmy Wallace	M/M E. W. "Bud" Johnston	1:08.80
1965	Jam N Jellie	5	Bill Hartack	A. J. Gorsky	Charles Galea	1:08.80
1964	Soldier Girl	3	Johnny Longden	Charles A. Comiskey	M/M John Tusquellas	1:09.40
1963	Sabina Louise	3	Jerry Lambert	Farrell W. Jones	Albert Sultan	1:12.20
1962	Sunday Slippers	3	Jackie Leonard	William W. Morris	M/M Horace B. Taylor	1:09.20
1961	Nascania	4	Emile Ohayon	Joseph S. Dunn	Howard B. Keck	1:09.00
1960	Perizade	4	Rudy Campas	Noble Threewitt	M/M T. M. Brown	1:09.20
1959	Sweet June	3	Raymond York	Tommy Doyle	M/M E. B. Johnston	1:09.20
1958	Camloc	3	Pete Moreno	R. D. Moon	Colin Campbell	1:09.80
1957	Myrtle	4	Ismael Valenzuela	Keith L. Stucki	Triple K. Stable	1:09.40
1956	In Reserve	4	Johnny Longden	Vance Longden	Alberta Ranches, Ltd.	1:09.40
1955	Robinar	3	Johnny Longden	John Craigmyle	Alberta Ranches, Ltd.	1:09.00
	1953–1954 no race					
1952	Sincerely	3	Bill Shoemaker	Reggie Cornell	Biff 's Stable	1:10.80
	1946–1951 no race					
1945	Double F. F.	3	Melvin Peterson	Jack Avant	Harry N. Isenberg	1:11.00

† In 1984, Royal Heroine finished first but was disqualified and set back to third.
