= John C. Mabee Stakes =

- Class: Grade II
- Location: Del Mar Racetrack; Del Mar, California, United States
- Inaugurated: 1945
- Race type: Thoroughbred - Flat racing
- Website: www.dmtc.com

Race information
- Distance: 1 1/8 miles (9 furlongs)
- Surface: Turf
- Track: Left-handed
- Qualification: Fillies & Mares, 3-years-old & up
- Weight: Assigned
- Purse: $200,000 (2016)

The John C. Mabee Stakes is an American Thoroughbred horse race contested in early August at the Del Mar Racetrack in Del Mar, California. It is run on the turf for fillies and mares, age three or older, at a distance of one and one-eighth miles. Downgraded to a Grade II stakes in 2010, the John C. Mabee Handicap currently offers a purse of $200,000. Part of the Breeders' Cup Challenge series, the winner of the 2010 race automatically qualifies for the Breeders' Cup Filly & Mare Turf.

The race is named in honor of John C. Mabee (1921-2002), a three-time winner of the Eclipse Award for Outstanding Breeder as owner of Golden Eagle Farm and someone the New York Times Company's subsidiary About.com calls "a California racing icon." Through 2001 the race was known as the Ramona Handicap, in honor of Ramona, California where Mabee's breeding farm was located, and as the John C. Mabee Ramona Handicap in 2002.

It was first run in 1945 on dirt at a distance of one mile (8 furlongs), it was not contested again until 1959 when the distance was set at its current 1 1/8 miles (9 furlongs). It was . It was run in two divisions in 1965, 1966, 1969 and was switched to the turf course in 1970.

In winning the 1971 race, Street Dancer set a new Del Mar course record then won again in 1972, breaking her own record.

== Records ==
Speed record:

- 1:46.34 Precious Kitten (2007)

Most wins:

- 3 - Flawlessly (1992, 1993, 1994)

Most wins by an owner:

- 3 - Harbor View Farm (1992, 1993, 1994)

Most wins by a jockey:

- 5 - Bill Shoemaker (1974, 1975, 1980, 1983, 1985)
- 5 - Corey Nakatani (1995, 1996, 1998, 2006, 2012)
- 5 - Flavien Prat (2016, 2018, 2019, 2020, 2021)

Most wins by a trainer:

- 9 - Charlie Whittingham (1968, 1975, 1976, 1980, 1981, 1991, 1992, 1993, 1994)

== Winners ==
Year	Winner	Age	Jockey	Trainer	Owner	Time
2026	Medoro	5	Juan J. Hernandez	Peter Eurton	C R K Stable	1:47.61
2025	Gimme a Nother (SAF)	5	Juan J. Hernandez	H. Graham Motion	Newstead Stables LLC	1:48.55
2024	Hang the Moon	4	Kazushi Kimura	Philip D'Amato	CJ Thoroughbreds	1:48.50
2023	Closing Remarks	5	Umberto Rispoli	Carla Gaines	Harris Farms Inc.	1:48.23
2022	Avenue de France (FR)	5	Juan J. Hernandez	Leonard Powell	Benowitz Family Trust, Convergence Stable Et Al.	1:47.96
2021	Going to Vegas	4	Flavien Prat	Richard Baltas	Abbondanza Racing LLC, Medallion Racing and MyRacehorse	1:48.14
2020	Raymundos Secret	4	Flavien Prat	Philip D'Amato	Sierra Racing & Sterling Stables	1:48.60
2019	Vasilika	5	Flavien Prat	Jerry Hollendorfer	All Schlaich Stables LLC, Hollendorfer, LLC, Gatto Racing, LLC and Todaro, G.	1:46.46
2018	Vasilika	4	Flavien Prat	Jerry Hollendorfer	All Schlaich Stables LLC, Hollendorfer, LLC, Gatto Racing, LLC and Todaro, G.	1:47.25
2017	Cambodia	5	Drayden Van Dyke	Thomas F. Proctor	Winter Quarter Farm	1:47.79
2016	Avenge	4	Flavien Prat	Richard E. Mandella	Ramona S. Bass	1:48.82
2015	Elektrum	4	Victor Espinoza	John W. Sadler	Hronis Racing	1:48.55
2014	Moulin de Mougin	4	Mike E. Smith	Richard Mandella	Ran Jan Racing	1:47.96
2013	Tiz Flirtatious	5	Julien Leparoux	Martin F. Jones	Pamela C. Ziebarth	1:51.71
2012	City to City	5	Corey Nakatani	Jerry Hollendorfer	DeBurgh/Hollendorfer/J & M DeDomenico	1:46.50
2011	Cozi Rosie	4	Garrett Gomez	John W. Sadler	Jerry & Ann Moss	1:47.69
2010	Wasted Tears	5	Rajiv Maragh	Bart B. Evans	Bart B. Evans	1:47.35
2009	Magical Fantasy	4	Alex Solis	Paddy Gallagher	Bienstock/Mandabach/Winner	1:47.17
2008	Black Mamba (NZ)	5	Garrett Gomez	John W. Sadler	Double Down Stables, Inc.	1:47.11
2007	Precious Kitten	4	Rafael Bejarano	Robert J. Frankel	Ken & Sarah Ramsey	1:46.34
2006	Dancing Edie	4	Corey Nakatani	Craig Dollase	J. Paul Reddam et al.	1:48.26
2005	Amorama	4	Martin Pedroza	Julio C. Canani	Marsha Naify/Woodside Farm	1:48.01
2004	Musical Chimes	4	Kent Desormeaux	Neil D. Drysdale	Sheikh Maktoum	1:47.09
2003	Megahertz	4	Alex Solis	Robert J. Frankel	Michael Bello	1:49.09
2002	Affluent	4	Ed Delahoussaye	Ron McAnally	Janis R. Witham	1:48.37
2001	Janet	4	David Flores	Darrell Vienna	Red Baron's Barn	1:48.20
2000	Caffe Latte	4	Brice Blanc	Bob Baffert	Stonerside Stable	1:47.16
1999	Tuzla	5	David Flores	Bob Baffert	Stonerside Stable	1:47.66
1998	See You Soon	4	Corey Nakatani	Robert J. Frankel	Charles Kenis	1:47.43
1997	Escena	4	Pat Day	William I. Mott	Allen E. Paulson	1:49.80
1996	Matiara	4	Corey Nakatani	Richard Mandella	Alec Head	1:49.28
1995	Possibly Perfect	5	Corey Nakatani	Robert J. Frankel	Blue Vista Inc.	1:49.98
1994	Flawlessly	6	Chris McCarron	Charlie Whittingham	Harbor View Farm	1:48.25
1993	Flawlessly	5	Chris McCarron	Charlie Whittingham	Harbor View Farm	1:48.38
1992	Flawlessly	4	Chris McCarron	Charlie Whittingham	Harbor View Farm	1:50.00
1991	Campagnarde	4	Julio Garcia	Charlie Whittingham	Allen E. Paulson	1:49.41
1990	Double Wedge	5	Robbie Davis	Robert J. Frankel	Edmund A. Gann	1:49.00
1989	Brown Bess	7	Jack Kaenel	Chuck Jenda	Calbourne Farm	1:48.80
1988	Annoconnor	4	Corey Black	John Gosden	Carelaine Farm	1:48.40
1987	Short Sleeves	5	Ed Delahoussaye	Darrell Vienna	Round Meadow Fm.	1:50.20
1986	Auspiciante	5	Gary Stevens	Ron McAnally	Jack Kent Cooke	1:48.40
1985	Daily Busy	4	Bill Shoemaker	Michael Whittingham	Oak Cliff Stable	1:48.20
1984	Flag de Lune	4	Frank Olivares	L. N. Anderson	McMinimy/McMurtrie/Weber	1:48.40
1983	Sangue	5	Bill Shoemaker	Henry M. Moreno	R. Charlene Parks	1:48.80
1982	Honey Fox	4	Marco Castaneda	Scotty Schulhofer	Jerome M. Torsney	1:48.80
1981	Queen to Conquer	5	Marco Castaneda	Charlie Whittingham	Wimborne Farm	1:48.80
1980	Queen to Conquer	4	Bill Shoemaker	Charlie Whittingham	Wimborne Farm	1:49.40
1979	Country Queen	4	Laffit Pincay, Jr.	Randy Winick	Blum/Sarant/Winick	1:48.60
1978	Drama Critic	4	Darrel McHargue	Ron McAnally	Elmendorf	1:49.20
1977	Dancing Femme	4	Darrel McHargue	Tommy Doyle	J. L. Finley	1:48.40
1976	Vagabonda	5	Sandy Hawley	Charlie Whittingham	Arno D. Schefler	1:51.00
1975	Dulcia	6	Bill Shoemaker	Charlie Whittingham	Helen G. Stollery	1:48.80
1974	Tizna	5	Bill Shoemaker	Henry M. Moreno	Nile Financial Corp.	1:49.20
1973	Minstrel Miss	6	Don Pierce	Gordon C. Campbell	Jack M. Grossman	1:49.40
1972	Street Dancer	5	Fernando Toro	John G. Canty	William T. Brady	1:48.20
1971	Street Dancer	4	Fernando Toro	John G. Canty	William T. Brady	1:48.80
1970	Hi Q.	4	H. K. Wellington	Hurst Philpot	M/M W. R. Foy	1:49.80
1969	Luz Del Sol	5	Ismael Valenzuela	Ron McAnally	Mrs. H. C. Morton	1:48.60
1968	Scoop Time	4	Larry Gilligan	Charlie Whittingham	Llangollen Farm	1:48.20
1967	Desert Trial	4	Alex Maese	Carl A. Roles	Muriel Vanderbilt Adams	1:48.80
1966	Desert Trial	3	Alex Maese	Carl A. Roles	Muriel Vanderbilt Adams	1:48.00
1965	Rullahline	3	Kenneth Church	John G. Canty	Neil S. McCarthy	1:47.80
1964	Jalousie II	5	Raymond York	Henry M. Moreno	Moreno/Sawyer/Macon	1:49.00
1963	Powder N Paint	3	Jerry Lambert	Farrell W. Jones	Elmendorf Farm	1:48.20
1962	Fun House	4	Raymond York	Robert L. Wheeler	C. V. Whitney	1:47.80
1961	Linita	4	Robert F. Mundorf	Clyde Turk	Corradini & Dorney	1:47.80
1960	Honey's Gem	5	Rudy Campas	Noble Threewitt	Conejo Ranch	1:47.60
1959	Boston Again	4	Alex Maese	Jim Weatherington	M/M Walter J. Beach	1:48.60
1945	Canina	4	Jack Westrope	Bob R. Roberts	Abe Hirschberg	1:37.00
