= Lena Olovsson =

Swedish footballer

Personal information
- Date of birth: 31 July 1955 (age 71)
- Place of birth: Västervik, Sweden
- Positions: Midfielder; goalkeeper

Lena Löfstedt (née Olovsson, born 31 July 1955) is a Swedish former footballer who played as a midfielder and goalkeeper.

Olovsson became Sweden's first female professional football player in 1975, when she played for the Italian team Sisal ACF Piacenza. Before that she played as a midfielder at FK Växjö.
