= Display Handicap =

- Class: Discontinued stakes race
- Location: Aqueduct Racetrack, Queens, New York, United States
- Inaugurated: 1955
- Race type: Thoroughbred – Flat racing

Race information
- Distance: 2 1/4 miles (18 furlongs)
- Surface: Dirt
- Track: left-handed
- Qualification: Three years and older

The Display Handicap was an American long distance Thoroughbred horse race held annually from 1955 through 1990. A race for 3-year-olds and up, it was run at the Jamaica Race Course from inception through 1958 at a distance of 21/16 miles. In 1959 the race was moved permanently to the newly renovated Aqueduct Racetrack after which the Jamaica track was closed and the property sold to real estate developers. From 1959 through 1969 it was contested at 2 miles then its final two decades was run at a distance of 2 1/4 miles. The Display Handicap was traditionally held on the last day of racing in New York City for that calendar year. It began ending the season on December 31, 1976, when year-round racing was introduced in New York.

The race was aptly named for Display, a son of Fair Play (as was Man o' War, elected #1 in the Blood-Horse magazine List of the Top 100 U.S. Racehorses of the 20th Century). Display was noted for being able to carry heavy weights over marathon distances successfully. The Display Handicap was distinctive for the fact that many horses who normally ran in claiming races (but possessed abundant stamina) would be entered in it, and a few such horses went on to win the event. In 1978, Seaney Bear nosed out Framarco, another horse who ran mostly in claiming races. They competed in one of the two divisions of the race which were run in that year, necessitated by an unusually high number of horses entered in the race. Although the race was for 3-year-olds and up, it was rare for a 3-year-old to win it; when In the Ruff won the 1983 running he became the first 3-year-old winner of the Display since Dean Carl in 1963, and the first ever at the 2 1/4-mile distance.

The Display Handicap was run in two divisions in 1974 and 1978 but in its later years field sizes became progressively smaller, with only five starters in what would prove to be the final running on December 31, 1990. The discontinuing of the Display Handicap left the Valedictory Stakes at Woodbine Racetrack in Toronto, Ontario (run at 1 3/4 miles) as the longest stakes race run on the dirt in North America.

== Historical notes ==
Mrs. Edward E. Robbins' Midafternoon came into the 1956 Display Handicap having already won two of that year's important races, the Metropolitan and Massachusetts Handicaps. In winning the Display, Midafternoon set a new Jamaica Race Course record with a time of 3:29 3/5 for 21/16 miles.

Primordial II was an Argentine-bred who had been racing in Venezuela for trainer Laffit Pincay Sr., father of Laffit Pincay Jr. who in 1966 would emigrate to the United States where would become one of the most successful in American racing history and a U.S. Racing Hall of Fame inductee. Primordial II was brought to the United States to run in the mile and one-half Washington, D.C. International Stakes. The 1962 Venezuelan Horse of the Year finished sixth to the legendary American runner Kelso but came back to win the two-mile Display Handicap by eight lengths over the heavily favored Christiana Stables runner Smart.

Paraje, an Argentine-bred bought as a two-year-old by the Venezuelan-owned Stud Los Libertadores who would race him in Venezuela until being sold in late 1970 to American businessman Sigmund Sommer. Paraje won the 1971 Display Handicap in track record time then won it again in each of the next two years. In the 1973 edition Paraje set a new American and world record time of 3:47 4/5 for 2 1/4 miles on dirt. Paraje's owner, Sigmund Sommer, would win this race a record total five times.

The only other horse to win the race more than once was Louis R. Rowan and Wheelock Whitney Jr.'s Quicken Tree who first won it in 1967 and after not running in the 1968 race, came back to win it again in 1969, defeating Hydrologist by 7 lengths.

The 1976 race was won by Frampton Delight when Cunning Trick was disqualified for interference as the two battled down the homestretch.

== Records ==
Speed record:

- 3:47.80 @ 2 1/4 miles (12 runnings) – Paraje (1973)
- 3:29.60 @ 21/16 miles (4 runnings) – Midafternoon (1956)
- 3:20.20 @ 2 miles (22 runnings) – Quicken Tree (1969)

Most wins:

- 3 – Paraje (1971, 1972, 1973)

Most wins by a jockey:

- 6 – Jorge Velásquez (1968, 1972, 1973, 1974, 1977, 1979)

Most wins by a trainer:

- 5 – Pancho Martin (1970, 1971, 1972, 1973)

Most wins by an owner:

- 5 – Sigmund Sommer (1970, 1971, 1972, 1973, 1978)

== Winners ==
| Year | Winner | Age | Jockey | Trainer | Owner | Dist. (Miles) | Time | Win$ | Gr. |
|---|---|---|---|---|---|---|---|---|---|
| 1990 | Blackhawk's Ghost | 3 | Dennis Carr | William V. Terrill | Aratrac Farm | 21/4 M | 4:02.60 | $50,940 | L |
| 1989 | Passing Ships | 5 | Ángel Cordero Jr. | Robert P. Klesaris | Gold-n-Oats Stable (Marisa Anne Lizza) | 21/4 M | 3:55.60 | $51,390 | G3 |
| 1988 | Easy N Dirty | 5 | Jorge Velásquez | Paulino O. Ortiz | Paulino O. Ortiz | 21/4 M | 3:53.40 | $48,330 | G3 |
| 1987 | Jane's Dilemma | 6 | José A. Santos | Richard W. Small | Robert E. Meyerhoff | 21/4 M | 3:56.40 | $70,290 | G3 |
| 1986 | Fabulous Move | 4 | Chris Antley | Oscar S. Barrera Sr. | Oscar S. Barrera Sr. | 21/4 M | 3:56.00 | $54,000 | G3 |
| 1985 | Erin Bright | 5 | Frank Lovato Jr. | C. R. McGaughey III | Ogden Mills Phipps | 21/4 M | 4:00.80 | $54,090 | G3 |
| 1984 | Putting Green | 4 | Ruben Hernandez | Chester Ross | Seymour Cohn | 21/4 M | 3:56.20 | $57,960 | G3 |
| 1983 | In the Ruff | 3 | Robbie Davis | Gasper S. Moschera | Albert Davis | 21/4 M | 3:55.40 | $51,570 | G3 |
| 1982 | Nice Pirate | 4 | Ángel Cordero Jr. | Thomas M. Walsh | Margarite Kern | 21/4 M | 3:57.00 | $51,030 | G3 |
| 1981 | Field Cat | 4 | Eric Beitia | J. Elliott Burch | Cornelius Vanderbilt Whitney | 21/4 M | 3:51.80 | $50,940 | G3 |
| 1980 | Peat Moss | 5 | Frank Lovato Jr. | Gilbert Puentes | Murray M. Garren | 21/4 M | 3:57.80 | $50,580 | G3 |
| 1979 | Ethnarch | 4 | Jorge Velásquez | Dominick A. Imperio | | 21/4 M | 3:55.80 | $50,220 | G3 |
| 1978-1 | Seaney Bear | 4 | Vincent Bracciale Jr. | Vincent R. Nocella | Richard R. Rand | 21/4 M | 3:53.60 | $31,740 | G3 |
| 1978-2 | Proud Arion | 4 | Eddie Maple | Pancho Martin | Sigmund Sommer | 21/4 M | 3:55.00 | $31,890 | G3 |
| 1977 | Gallivantor | 5 | Jorge Velásquez | Joseph A. Trovato | Jack R. Hogan | 21/4 M | 3:50.80 | $32,490 | G3 |
| 1976 | Frampton Delight | 4 | Jean Cruguet | Everett W. King | Len Ragozin | 21/4 M | 3:54.80 | $33,510 | G3 |
| 1975 | Sharp Gary | 4 | Sandy Hawley | Robert J. Frankel | Edward R. Scharps | 21/4 M | 3:52.20 | $32,520 | |
| 1974-1 | Outdoors | 5 | Daryl Montoya | John W. Russell | Ogden Phipps | 21/4 M | 3:51.60 | $32,670 | |
| 1974-2 | Copte | 4 | Jorge Velásquez | Angel Penna Sr. | Daniel Wildenstein | 21/4 M | 3:50.40 | $32,520 | |
| 1973 | Paraje | 7 | Jorge Velásquez | Pancho Martin | Sigmund Sommer | 21/4 M | 3:47.80 | $33,840 | |
| 1972 | Paraje | 6 | Jorge Velásquez | Pancho Martin | Sigmund Sommer | 21/4 M | 3:56.40 | $33,570 | |
| 1971 | Paraje | 5 | Laffit Pincay Jr. | Pancho Martin | Sigmund Sommer | 21/4 M | 3:52.00 | $33,840 | |
| 1970 | Hitchcock | 4 | Eddie Belmonte | Pancho Martin | Sigmund Sommer | 2 M | 3:21.20 | $34,380 | |
| 1969 | Quicken Tree | 6 | Fernando Alvarez | William T. Canney | Louis R. Rowan & Wheelock Whitney Jr. | 2 M | 3:20.20 | $39,130 | |
| 1968 | Fast Count | 5 | Jorge Velásquez | Everett W. King | Syl George Stable (Sylvia Chapman) | 2 M | 3:23.60 | $36,205 | |
| 1967 | Quicken Tree | 4 | Fernando Alvarez | Clyde Turk | Louis R. Rowan & Wheelock Whitney Jr. | 2 M | 3:25.00 | $38,025 | |
| 1966 | Damelo II | 5 | Manuel Ycaza | Laz Barrera | Manual R. Giberga | 2 M | 3:24.60 | $36,660 | |
| 1965 | Brave Lad | 4 | Braulio Baeza | Sylvester E. Veitch | Fitz Eugene Dixon Jr. | 2 M | 3:26.60 | $37,115 | |
| 1964 | Primordial II | 7 | Laffit Pincay Sr. | Santiago L. Ledwith | Santiago L. Ledwith | 2 M | 3:28.40 | $36,530 | |
| 1963 | Dean Carl | 3 | Bobby Ussery | Paul Bongarzone | Paul Bongarzone | 2 M | 3:21.80 | $36,465 | |
| 1962 | Sensitivo | 5 | Manuel Ycaza | Arnold N. Winick | M/M Robert F. Bensinger | 2 M | 3:21.80 | $36,920 | |
| 1961 | Hillsborough | 4 | Don Pierce | Edward A. Neloy | Peter D. Fuller | 2 M | 3:29.80 | $38,010 | |
| 1960 | Nickel Boy | 5 | Manuel Ycaza | Walter A. Kelley | Elmendorf (Maxwell Gluck) | 2 M | 3:21.20 | $35,935 | |
| 1959 | Beau Diable | 6 | Eric Guerin | George P. "Maje" Odom | Laudy L. Lawrence | 2 M | 3:22.60 | $37,490 | |
| 1958 | Civet | 5 | Bill Peake | T. F. McMahon | Brynalan Stable (E. Austin Byrne) | 21/16 M | 3:34.20 | $36,515 | |
| 1957 | Oh Johnny | 4 | Bobby Ussery | Norman R. McLeod | Mrs. Wallace Gilroy | 21/16 M | 3:32.20 | $39,500 | |
| 1956 | Midafternoon | 4 | Eddie Arcaro | Thomas M. Waller | Mrs. Edward E. Robbins | 21/16 M | 3:29.60 | $19,650 | |
| 1955 | War Command | 5 | Bill Boland | H. Allen Jerkens | Albert J. Mesler | 21/16 M | 3:32.60 | $20,400 | |

== See also ==
- Display
- Handicap race
