= Cougar II Stakes =

American Thoroughbred horse race

- Class: Grade III
- Location: Del Mar Racetrack; Del Mar, California, United States
- Inaugurated: 1937 (as Escondido Handicap)
- Race type: Thoroughbred - Flat racing
- Website: Del Mar

Race information
- Distance: 1 1/2 miles (12 furlongs)
- Surface: Dirt
- Track: left-handed
- Qualification: Three-years-old and older
- Weight: 125 lbs with allowances
- Purse: $100,000 (2024)

The Cougar II Stakes is a Grade III American Thoroughbred horse race for three-year-olds over a distance of one and one-half miles on the dirt, scheduled annually in late July or early August at Del Mar Racetrack in Del Mar, California. The event currently carries a purse of $100,000.

== History ==
The event was inaugurated during the first racing season at Del Mar race track on 31 July 1937 as the Escondido Handicap over a distance of six furlongs for horses three-year-old or older. The event was an under card event on Del Mar Handicap day. The winner was Clean Out and the second and third place getters were mares. The event was held once more in 1938 but was interrupted for 11 years and did not resume until 1949 as an event for three-year-old fillies. In 1950 the event was held for two-year-olds as the Escondido Stakes. The event was idle for three years from 1952 and when it was resumed in 1955 the distance was set to 1 1/16 miles.

In 1956 the Irish-bred Poona set a new track record for the 1 1/16-mile distance of 1:40.20.

In 1962 the event was moved to the new turf track and run over the mile and one-eighth distance.

Between 1963 and 1984 the event was held in split divisions eight times.

From 1976 to 1988 the event was held over the mile and one-sixteenth distance with the exception of 1984 when it was held over 7 1/2 furlongs and in 1985 when the event was not held due to a boycott by trainers.

In 2007 the event was renamed in honor of National Museum of Racing and Hall of Fame inductee, the Chilean-bred Cougar II as the Cougar II Handicap who had set a course record when winning this event in 1970.

The race from 1988 to 2007 was run as an overnight restricted handicap for horse three-years-old who had not won a sweepstakes during the year over a distance of 1 3/8 miles.

In 2008 the event was moved to the new Polytrack artificial dirt surface which was installed at the track and the distance of the event was extended to 1 1/2 miles. The event continued to be held on this surface until 2014.

In 2010 the event was classified by the American Graded Stakes Committee as a Grade III race.

The winner had automatic qualification for a berth in the Breeders' Cup Marathon before that race was discontinued in 2013.

In 2020 due to the COVID-19 pandemic in the United States, the event was canceled and not rescheduled.

In 2021 the conditions of the event changed from a handicap to stakes with allowances and hence the name of the race was modified to Cougar II Stakes.

== Records ==
Time record:

- 1 1/2 miles (dirt): 2:30.09 – Heywoods Beach (2022)
- 1 1/2 miles (polytrack): 2:29.01 – Irish Surf (2014) (Track record)
- 1 3/8 miles (turf): 2:12.06 - †Laura's Lucky Boy (2005)
- 1 1/8 miles (turf): 1:49.00 - Cougar II (CHI) (1970)
- 1 1/16 miles (turf): 1:42.00 - Advocatum (1981)
- 1 1/16 miles (dirt): 1:40.20 - Poona II (IRE) (1956) (Track record)
- 7 1/2 furlongs (turf): 1:27.40 - Buck Price (1975)

Margins:

- 10 1/4 lengths: – Midnight Mammoth (2024)

Most wins:

- 2 – Big John A (1968, 1969)
- 2 – Dowty (1997, 1998)
- 2 – Richard's Kid (2012, 2013)

Most wins by an owner:

- 3 – Juddmonte (1988, 1991, 2002)
- 3 – Glen Hill Farm (1974, 1977, 2003)
- 3 – Gary A. Tanaka (1996, 2004, 2007)

Most wins by a jockey:

- 4 – Fernando Toro (1970, 1978, 1987, 1988)
- 4 – Rafael Bejarano (2012, 2015, 2018, 2019)

Most wins by a trainer:

- 4 – Robert J. Frankel (1975, 1991, 1993, 2002)
- 4 – Richard E. Mandella (1987, 2001, 2005, 2021)
- 4 – John W. Sadler (2008, 2016, 2019, 2022)

== Winners ==
Year	Winner	Age	Jockey	Trainer	Owner	Distance	Time	Purse	Grade	Ref
Cougar II Stakes
2024	Midnight Mammoth	5	Armando Ayuso	Craig Dollase	Jeffrey Sengara	1 1/2 miles	2:32.03	$100,000	III	
2023	Order and Law	5	Kent J. Desormeaux	Robert Hess Jr.	Larry S. Buckendorf, Jeffrey Lambert, Lawrence A. Rodriguez, Paul G. Schneider, Peter Stotland & Matthew D. White	1 1/2 miles	2:32.35	$126,000	III	
2022	Heywoods Beach	5	Ramon A. Vazquez	John W. Sadler	Hronis Racing	1 1/2 miles	2:30.09	$125,500	III	
2021	Tizamagician	4	Flavien Prat	Richard E. Mandella	MyRacehorse & Spendthrift Farm	1 1/2 miles	2:31.45	$100,500	III	
2020	Race not held									
Cougar II Handicap
2019	Campaign	4	Rafael Bejarano	John W. Sadler	Woodford Racing	1 1/2 miles	2:32.36	$100,000	III	
2018	Beach View	5	Rafael Bejarano	Leonard Powell	Levy Racing	1 1/2 miles	2:34.02	$100,690	III	
2017	Curlin Road	4	Flavien Prat	Doug F. O'Neill	R3 Racing, Calara Farms & ERJ Racing	1 1/2 miles	2:31.74	$100,690	III	
2016	Hard Aces	6	Santiago Gonzalez	John W. Sadler	Hronis Racing	1 1/2 miles	2:30.55	$98,000	III	
2015	Big John B	6	Rafael Bejarano	Philip D'Amato	Michael House	1 1/2 miles	2:31.62	$100,000	III	
2014	Irish Surf	4	Elvis Trujillo	Dan L. Hendricks	Gainesway Stable & Thor-Bred Bred Stable	1 1/2 miles	2:29.01	$100,750	III	
2013	Richard's Kid	8	Joseph Talamo	Doug F. O'Neill	David Kenney, Triple B Farms, Westside Rentals.com, et al.	1 1/2 miles	2:30.93	$100,500	III	
2012	Richard's Kid	7	Rafael Bejarano	Bob Baffert	Zabeel Racing International	1 1/2 miles	2:29.22	$100,000	III	
2011	Bourbon Bay	5	Joseph Talamo	Neil D. Drysdale	David and Jill Heerensperger	1 1/2 miles	2:29.39	$125,000	III	
2010	Temple City	5	Joseph Talamo	Carla Gaines	Spendthrift Farm	1 1/2 miles	2:30.46	$125,000	III	
2009	Unusual Suspect	5	Alonso Quinonez	Barry Abrams	Barry, David & Dyan Abrams	1 1/2 miles	2:31.22	$150,000	Listed	
2008	Zappa	6	Garrett K. Gomez	John W. Sadler	Gary & Cecil Barber	1 1/2 miles	2:30.53	$150,000	Listed	
2007	Atlando (IRE)	6	Martin A. Pedroza	Darrell Vienna	Gary A. Tanaka	1 3/8 miles	2:13.18	$88,935		
Escondido Handicap
2006	Runaway Dancer	7	Alex O. Solis	Dan L. Hendricks	R L Stables	1 3/8 miles	2:13.20	$88,605		
2005	†Laura's Lucky Boy	4	Corey Nakatani	Richard E. Mandella	Mercedes Stables	1 3/8 miles	2:12.06	$82,450		
2004	§ Sarafan	7	Corey Nakatani	Neil D. Drysdale	Gary A. Tanaka	1 3/8 miles	2:12.92	$79,000		
2003	Bonus Pack	5	Kent J. Desormeaux	Thomas F. Proctor	Glen Hill Farm	1 3/8 miles	2:12.50	$81,625		
2002	Dance Dreamer	4	Kent J. Desormeaux	Robert J. Frankel	Juddmonte	1 3/8 miles	2:12.86	$78,650		
2001	Cagney (BRZ)	4	Alex O. Solis	Richard E. Mandella	Stud TNT	1 3/8 miles	2:14.19	$83,975		
2000	Alvo Certo (BRZ)	7	Omar A. Berrio	Antonio C. Avila	Bandeirantes Stable	1 3/8 miles	2:15.23	$80,850		
1999	Astarabad	5	Chris Antley	Julio C. Canani	David S. Milch	1 3/8 miles	2:13.74	$78,900		
1998	Dowty	6	Gary L. Stevens	William I. Mott	Allen E. & Madeleine A. Paulson	1 3/8 miles	2:14.13	$78,700		
1997	Dowty	5	Gary L. Stevens	William I. Mott	Allen E. Paulson	1 3/8 miles	2:15.62	$80,550		
1996	Dernier Empereur	5	Pat Valenzuela	Ben D. A. Cecil	Gary A. Tanaka	1 3/8 miles	2:18.80	$104,800		
1995	Varadavour (IRE)	6	Ronald J. Warren Jr.	Mike Puype	Frank Gogliano	1 3/8 miles	2:16.09	$106,650		
1994	Sir Mark Sykes (IRE)	5	Corey Black	Jenine Sahadi	Mike H. Sloan	1 3/8 miles	2:13.84	$81,375		
1993	Luazur (FR)	4	Pat Day	Robert J. Frankel	Edmund A. Gann	1 3/8 miles	2:14.61	$81,825		
1992	Navarone	4	Pat Valenzuela	Rodney Rash	Robert E. Hibbert	1 3/8 miles	2:12.56	$81,075		
1991	Berillon (GB)	4	Gary L. Stevens	Robert J. Frankel	Juddmonte	1 3/8 miles	2:12.92	$79,425		
1990	Rial (ARG)	5	Jose M. Fernandez	Vincent Clyne	Erick C. Boelcke	1 3/8 miles	2:14.60	$81,825		
1989	Brisque (AUS)	6	Eddie Delahoussaye	Donn L. Luby	Charles & Audrey Kenis-3 plus U Stable	1 3/8 miles	2:16.00	$83,150		
1988	Mazilier	4	Fernando Toro	John Gosden	Juddmonte	1 1/16 miles	1:42.40	$67,050		
1987	Captain Vigors	5	Fernando Toro	Richard E. Mandella	Jack Grossman	1 1/16 miles	1:42.20	$56,150		
1986	Truce Maker	8	Frank Olivares	Michael C. Whittingham	Greer Garson & Buddy Fogelson	1 1/16 miles	1:42.20	$54,950		
1985	Race not held									
1984	Go Dancer (FR)	5	Chris McCarron	John Gosden	Howard W. Koch, Aaron & Candy Spelling	7 1/2 furlongs	1:29.00	$46,100		Division 1
1984	Pair of Deuces	6	Ray Sibille	Laz Barrera	Happy Valley Farm & John H. Hartigan	7 1/2 furlongs	1:28.80	$46,100		Division 2
1983	Pin Puller	4	Chris McCarron	Willard L. Proctor	Heardsdale Racing	1 1/16 miles	1:43.00	$55,750		
1982	Rock Softly	4	Kenneth D. Black	Jesse C. Newsom	Byron, Davis, Gilson, et al.	1 1/16 miles	1:42.80	$55,500		
1981	Advocatum	5	Darrel G. McHargue	Melvin F. Stute	Constance S. Wilson	1 1/16 miles	1:42.00	$56,300		
1980	§ Nain Bleu (FR)	4	Laffit Pincay Jr.	Thomas Ray Bell II	Bell Bloodstock & Gayno Stable	1 1/16 miles	1:43.00	$44,050		
1979	Uniformity	7	Sandy Hawley	Mike R. Mitchell	Sydell Smith	1 1/16 miles	1:43.60	$44,100		
1978	Bywayofchicago	4	Fernando Toro	Thomas A. Pratt	Robert Fluor, Sidney Port & Herman Sarkowsky	1 1/16 miles	1:42.40	$33,500		
1977	Authorization	5	Darrel G. McHargue	Willard L. Proctor	Glen Hill Farm	1 1/16 miles	1:43.00	$21,375		Division 1
1977	Pikehall	3	Henry E. Moreno	Charles E. Whittingham	Howard B. Keck	1 1/16 miles	1:43.00	$21,375		Division 2
1976	Silver Saber	4	Laffit Pincay Jr.	Thomas Ray Bell II	Bell Bloodstock	1 1/16 miles	1:43.00	$28,150		
1975	Buck Price	4	Darrel G. McHargue	Robert J. Frankel	Martin Ritt	7 1/2 furlongs	1:27.40	$27,900		
1974	Flighting	7	Robert Howard	Willard L. Proctor	Glen Hill Farm	7 1/2 furlongs	1:29.00	$21,375		Division 1
1974	Bensadream	4	Jorge Tejeira	Michael E. Millerick	Ben Osher & Carl Hodges	7 1/2 furlongs	1:29.00	$21,375		Division 2
1973	Tannyhill	4	Donald Pierce	Robert G. Craft	Rex C. Ellsworth	1 1/8 miles	1:49.60	$33,250		
1972	Mongo's Pride	4	William Mahorney	Jack Van Berg	Van Berg Stable	1 1/8 miles	1:49.60	$26,950		
1971	Born Wild	4	Johnny Sellers	A. Thomas Doyle	Westerly Stud	1 1/8 miles	1:49.60	$27,200		
1970	Cougar II (CHI)	4	Fernando Toro	George A. Riley	Perla de Chico Stud	1 1/8 miles	1:49.00	$22,050		
1969	Big John A.	5	Concepcion Barria	Thomas F. Richardson	Mrs. C. J. Dorfman	1 1/8 miles	1:50.60	$28,450		
1968	Big John A.	4	Antonio L. Diaz	Thomas F. Richardson	Mrs. C. J. Dorfman	1 1/8 miles	1:51.20	$19,600		Division 1
1968	Till Morrow	4	Álvaro Pineda	William H. Wyndle	Mrs. Kathryn Hart	1 1/8 miles	1:51.20	$19,400		Division 2
1967	Strawberry Drive	5	Donald Pierce	John W. Pappalardo	William F. Fenske	1 1/8 miles	1:50.20	$17,150		Division 1
1967	Estambul II (ARG)	5	Donald Pierce	Morton Lipton	Vicgray Farm	1 1/8 miles	1:50.20	$16,850		Division 2
1966	Quicken Tree	3	Raul Caballero	Clyde Turk	Louis R. Rowan	1 1/8 miles	1:50.20	$20,175		Division 1
1966	ƒ Amerigo's Fancy	4	Raul Caballero	C. Ralph West	Mr. & Mrs. Desi Arnez	1 1/8 miles	1:49.60	$20,075		Division 2
1965	Switchback	5	Miguel Yanez	James D. Jordan	The Pam Stable	1 1/8 miles	1:50.40	$23,150		
1964	Desert Chief III (NZ)	8	Donald Ross	Dale K. Landers	Valley Stables	1 1/8 miles	1:50.20	$14,325		Division 1
1964	Victory Beauty	8	George Taniguchi	Louis R. Carno	Mr. & Mrs. Nelson H. Monroe & Sons	1 1/8 miles	1:50.00	$14,325		Division 2
1963	Braganza (NZ)	8	Miguel Yanez	Morton Lipton	Triad Stables	1 1/8 miles	1:51.40	$16,950		Division 1
1963	Moon Mad	4	Angel Valenzuela	William A. Reavis	Richlew Stable	1 1/8 miles	1:50.00	$16,950		Division 2
1962	Hardware	3	George Taniguchi	Clyde Turk	Mr. & Mrs George Dorney	1 1/8 miles	1:51.40	$23,200		
1961	§ Top Double	3	Emile Ohayon	Clyde Turk	Earl Beaty & George Dorney	1 1/16 miles	1:41.60	$16,825		
1960	Cleave	4	Basil Frazier	Charles A. Comiskey	F. H. Smith	1 1/16 miles	1:41.20	$16,500		
1959	I Step	3	Ronald Griffiths	Harold Beasy	Mrs. Peggy H. Lester	1 1/16 miles	1:41.80	$16,575		
1958	Solid Fleet	4	Carlos DeMello	Harry C. Richards	Kessix Stable	1 1/16 miles	1:41.60	$16,350		
1957	Hi Pardner	5	Tony Dominguez	Warren Stute	Clement L. Hirsch	1 1/16 miles	1:41.60	$16,075		
1956	Poona II (IRE)	5	Johnny Adams	Graceton Philpot	Helbush Farms	1 1/16 miles	1:40.20	$16,125		
1955	Arrogate	4	Ralph Neves	Reginald Cornell	Mr. & Mrs. Dick Griegorian	1 1/16 miles	1:42.40	$11,000		
1952–1954		Race not held								
1951	Caruso II (AUS)	7	Johnny Longden	William Molter	William Goetz	6 furlongs	1:10.60	$2,500		
Escondido Stakes
1950	Pat's Own	2	Walter Litzenberg	C. Ralph West	Mr. & Mrs. R. S. Ross	5 1/2 furlongs	1:04.20	$6,675	♯ 2YOs	
Escondido Handicap
1949	ƒ Great Dream	3	Billy Pearson	Russell H. McDaniel	Mr. & Mrs. Russell H. McDaniel	6 furlongs	1:10.40	$5,000	‡3YO fillies	
1939–1948		Race not held								
1938	Happy Bolivar	5	George Burns	W. A. Thomas	Mrs. Albert M. Koewler	6 furlongs	1:10.60	$1,610		
1937	ƒ Clean Out	5	D. Smith	William Finnegan	Mrs. Vera S. Bragg	6 furlongs	1:11.60	$1,115	¶3YOs & up	

Legend:
All Weather Track Dirt Turf
Notes:
§ Ran as an entry
ƒ Filly or Mare
‡ In 1949 the event was for three-year-old fillies
♯ In 1950 the event was for two-year-olds as Escondido Stakes
† In the 2005 running, Sarafan was first past the post but was disqualified for interference in the straight and Laura's Lucky Boy was declared the winner.

== See also ==
List of American and Canadian Graded races
