= Junior Miss (disambiguation) =

Junior Miss is a collection of semi-autobiographical stories by Sally Benson.

Junior Miss may also refer to:

- Junior Miss (film), a 1945 film adaptation of the stories
- The Junior Miss (DuPont Show of the Month), a 1958 adaptatin aired as part of the DuPont Show of the Month
- one of the clothing sizes for young women
- Distinguished Young Women, a program for high school students formerly known as America's Junior Miss
- Junior Miss Stakes, a former graded stakes race for two-year-old fillies, not run since 1992
