= Ruken =

American-bred Thoroughbred racehorse

- Sire: Nashville
- Grandsire: Nasrullah
- Dam: Thank You Ma'm
- Damsire: Your Host
- Sex: Stallion
- Foaled: 1964
- Country: United States
- Colour: Dark Bay/Brown
- Breeder: Louis R. Rowan
- Owner: Louis R. Rowan
- Trainer: Clyde Turk
- Record: 27: 7-8-7
- Earnings: US$269,485

Major wins
- Del Mar Futurity (1966); Santa Anita Derby (1967); Spendthrift Purse (1967); Stepping Stone Purse (1967)

Ruken (foaled in 1964 in California) was an American Thoroughbred racehorse who competed at the highest levels in California and was the bettors third choice to win the 1967 Kentucky Derby. Bred and raced by Louis R. Rowan, Ruken was sired by Nasrullah's son Nashville who won the 1957 Lakes And Flowers and Palos Verdes Handicaps. His dam was Thank You Ma'm, a daughter of the multiple stakes winner Your Host who sired the five-time American Horse of the Year, Kelso.

Ridden by Fernando Alvarez and trained by Clyde Turk, Ruken won the 1967 Santa Anita Derby, the most important event for three-year-olds in California. At Keeneland he beat the 2 year-old champion Successor in the Spendthrift Purse. At Churchill Downs he won the Stepping Stone Purse which prompted bettors to make Ruken their third choice for the Kentucky Derby in which he would finish eighth.

When his racing career was over, Ruken served as a breeding stallion. He sired several stakes winners including Vic's Magic (f. 1973) who earned more than US$237,000.
