= Precious Kitten =

American-bred Thoroughbred racehorse

- Sire: Catienus
- Grandsire: Storm Cat
- Dam: Kitten's First
- Damsire: Lear Fan
- Sex: Filly
- Foaled: 2003
- Country: United States
- Colour: Dark Bay/Brown
- Breeder: Ken & Sarah Ramsey
- Owner: Ken & Sarah Ramsey; Lael Stables (2008)
- Trainer: Robert J. Frankel
- Record: 24: 8-9-1
- Earnings: $1,812,543

Major wins
- Mrs. Revere Stakes (2006); John C. Mabee Handicap (2007); Matriarch Stakes (2007); Palomar Handicap (2007); Gallorette Handicap (2007); Gamely Stakes (2008)

Precious Kitten (foaled February 20, 2003 in Kentucky) is an American Thoroughbred racehorse who has won three career Grade 1 races.

In winning the 2007 Gallorette Handicap, Precious Kitten set a new Pimlico Race Course course record of 1:40.32 for 1 ^{1}/16 miles.

Her last outing was in the 2008 Breeders' Cup Mile in which she finished fourth to winner, Goldikova.
