= A. Thomas Doyle =

Irish-born American racehorse trainer (1917–1989)

Andrew Thomas Doyle
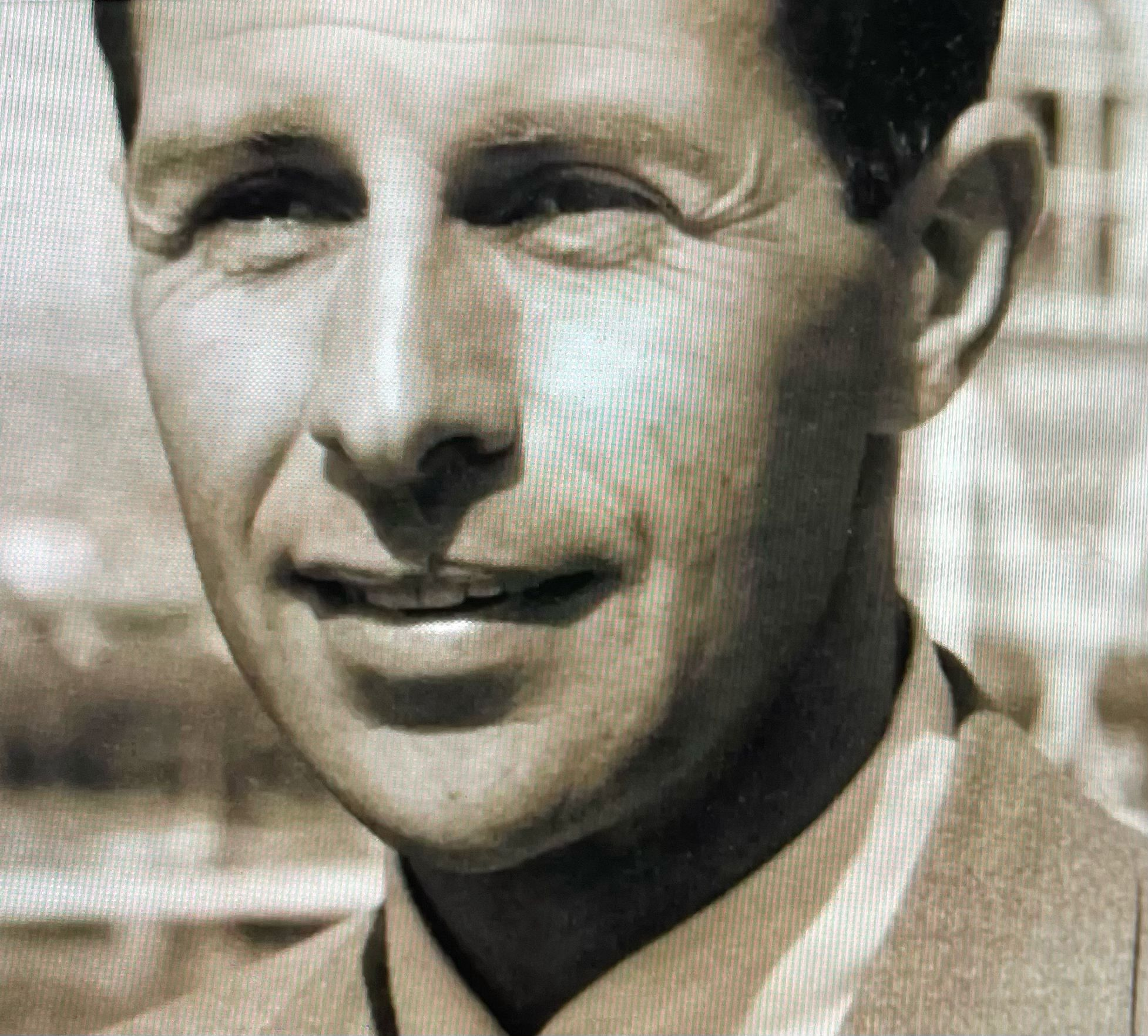

Personal information
- Born: September 23, 1917 Dublin, Ireland
- Died: July 22, 1989 (aged 71)
- Occupation: Trainer

Horse racing career
- Sport: Horse racing

Major racing wins
- Santa Maria Handicap (1957); Junior Miss Stakes (1958, 1960, 1966, 1973, 1974, 1984); Del Mar Debutante Stakes (1959, 1966, 1968, 1972, 1973, 1976, 1980); Palomar Handicap (1959, 1977); Bing Crosby Handicap (1971); Del Mar Futurity (1971); Escondido Handicap (1971); Las Palmas Handicap (1971); Norfolk Stakes (1971, 1976); Speakeasy Stakes (1971, 1976); Del Mar Oaks (1972, 1973, 1976); Gamely Handicap (1972); Hollywood Invitational Turf Handicap (1972, 1975); Landaluce Stakes (1972, 1984); Milady Handicap (1972); Man o' War Stakes (1972); Santa Monica Handicap (1972); Sunset Handicap (1972, 1975); Las Flores Handicap (1973); Sorrento Stakes (1972, 1973, 1976); Santa Anita Derby (1975, 1977, 1984); El Encino Stakes (1976); San Luis Rey Handicap (1976); Santa Margarita Invitational Handicap (1976); Autumn Days Handicap (1977); Ramona Handicap (1977); San Juan Capistrano Handicap (1977); San Gabriel Handicap (1978); San Luis Obispo Handicap (1978); Strub Stakes (1978); San Pasqual Handicap (1979); Acorn Stakes (1983); Santa Ysabel Stakes (1983) American Classic Race wins: Belmont Stakes (1975)

Significant horses
- Avatar, Habitony, Typecast, Ski Goggle, Windy's Daughter

Andrew Thomas Doyle (September 23, 1917 – July 22, 1989) was an American Thoroughbred racehorse trainer known for his success with young horses. He was reported as both "Tommy Doyle" and "A. T. Doyle."

A native of Dublin, Ireland, Tommy Doyle came from a family with a long history in the sport of horse racing. He emigrated to the United States in 1951 and made his way to California where he eventually owned a ranch in Bradbury on which he raised and trained horses.

Widely respected for his ability to work with young horses, two-year-olds fillies trained by Tommy Doyle won the Junior Miss and Del Mar Debutante Stakes a combined thirteen times. Among his best-known horses, Doyle trained Typecast to the 1972 American Champion Older Female Horse title and in 1975 conditioned Avatar to wins in the Santa Anita Derby and the third leg of the U.S. Triple Crown, the Belmont Stakes.

Tommy Doyle died from Alzheimer's disease at age 71 in 1989.
