= Quicken Tree (horse) =

American-bred Thoroughbred racehorse

- Sire: Royal Orbit
- Grandsire: Royal Charger
- Dam: Mother Wit
- Damsire: Counterpoint
- Sex: Gelding
- Foaled: 1963
- Country: United States
- Colour: Chestnut
- Breeder: Louis R. Rowan
- Owner: Louis R. Rowan/Wheelock Whitney, Jr.
- Trainer: 1) Clyde Turk; 2) William T. Canney
- Record: 74: 15-9-13
- Earnings: US$718,303

Major wins
- Escondido Handicap (1966); Tropicana Hotel of Las Vegas Handicap (1966); Display Handicap (1967, 1969); Inglewood Handicap (1967); Rancho Bernardo Handicap (1967); Del Mar Handicap (1968); Jockey Club Gold Cup (1968); Manhattan Handicap (1968); San Luis Obispo Handicap (1969); Santa Anita Handicap (1970); San Juan Capistrano Invitational Handicap (1970)

Quicken Tree (April 18, 1963 – October 22, 1970) was an American Thoroughbred racehorse known for his come-from-behind style of running and his ability to win at classic and marathon distances. His California breeder, Louis Rowan, a co-founder of the Oak Tree Racing Association, named the horse after one of the folk names given to the Rowan plant.

== Background ==
Quicken Tree was foaled in California at Louis Rowan's Summit Lake Farm. He was sired by 1959 Preakness Stakes winner Royal Orbit, a grandson of Nearco whom Thoroughbred Heritage calls "one of the greatest racehorses of the Twentieth Century". Louis Rowan owned Quicken Tree's dam, Mother Wit, a daughter of 1951 American Horse of the Year Counterpoint, who was a son of 1943 U.S. Triple Crown champion and Hall of Fame inductee Count Fleet. Rowan, a co-founder of the Oak Tree Racing Association, raced him in partnership with Wheelock Whitney, Jr.

== Racing career ==
Quicken Tree was extremely high-strung, and trainer Clyde Turk had a great deal of difficulty training him. The decision was then made to geld the horse. The operation changed little, but time and patience paid off, and Quicken Tree made his racing debut at age three in January 1966. Still skittish, he had problems in the starting gate and froze at the sound of the bell. After departing well behind the rest of the field, he finished last. His "freezing up" at the sound of the starting bell plagued him throughout his racing career. Nonetheless, Quicken Tree's problem meant come-from-behind performances that made him a crowd favorite. He won for the first time in his fourth start, after which he performed poorly and was entered in claiming races.

Nearing the end of Quicken Tree's three-year-old campaign, he won a division of the Escondido Handicap at Del Mar Racetrack and the Tropicana Hotel of Las Vegas Handicap at Bay Meadows Racetrack. In early 1967, Minnesota sportsman Wheelock Whitney, Jr. purchased a part interest in the then-four-year-old. That year, Quicken Tree won two important handicaps in California, then captured the two-mile Display Handicap at Aqueduct Racetrack in New York City. In 1968, he won in California and earned the biggest wins of his career to that point on New York racetracks, where he competed against such stars as future U.S. Racing Hall of Fame inductees Dr. Fager and Damascus. Quicken Tree's 1968 wins included the Jockey Club Gold Cup at a distance of two miles and the Manhattan Handicap at a mile and a half.

In 1969, Quicken Tree added to his resume. In 1970, trainer Clyde Turk's assistant, William Canney, took over the horse's race conditioning. Under Canney, he continued to win, and, twenty years after Noor won both the 1¼ mile Santa Anita Handicap and the 1¾ mile San Juan Capistrano Invitational Handicap, Quicken Tree became the only other horse to accomplish that feat.

== Injury and death ==
His win in the San Juan Capistrano Invitational Handicap (a dead heat with Fiddle Isle) was his last victory. Although he recovered following an operation to repair a cracked sesamoid bone that occurred when he kicked the wall in his stall, he developed a case of enteritis and died in his stall at Santa Anita Park on October 22, 1970. He was buried next to Lamb Chop near the mile and a quarter chute at Santa Anita Park.
