= Speakeasy Stakes =

- Class: Ungraded stakes
- Location: Santa Anita Park; Arcadia, California
- Inaugurated: 1969
- Race type: Thoroughbred - Flat racing

Race information
- Distance: 5 furlongs
- Surface: Turf
- Track: Left-handed
- Qualification: Two Years Old
- Purse: US$100,000

The Speakeasy Stakes is an American Thoroughbred horse race held annually at Santa Anita Park in Arcadia, California. A race for two-year-old horses of either sex, it is run at a distance of five furlongs. From inception in 1969 through 2018 the race was run on dirt. For its forty-sixth running in 2019 it became a race on turf and was made part of the "Win and You're In" qualifying race for the Breeders' Cup Juvenile Turf Sprint. In 2010 the race was hosted by the now defunct Hollywood Park Racetrack in Inglewood, California.

== Race names ==
- Tim Conway Stakes : 2012
- Jack Goodman Stakes : 2007-2011
- Sunny Slope Stakes : 1969-2006

== Records ==
Speed record:

- 1:08.27 @ 6 furlongs - Secret Circle (2011)

Most wins by a jockey:

- 6 - Bill Shoemaker (1970, 1971, 1973, 1975, 1976, 1982)

Most wins by a trainer:

- 6 - Bob Baffert (1998, 2009, 2011, 2013, 2014, 2015)

Most wins by an owner:

- 2 - Bernard J. Ridder (1977, 1978)
- 2 - Cardiff Stud Farm (1979, 1982)
- 2 - Karl Watson, Michael Pegram, Paul Weitman (2011, 2015)

== Winners ==
Year	Winner	Age	Jockey	Trainer	Owner	Dist. (Furlongs)	Time	Win$
2026						5 F (T)	$	
2025	Later Than Planned	2	Umberto Rispoli	Philip D'Amato	Little Red Feather Racing (Billy Koch, founder & managing partner)	5 F (T)	0:55.85	$60,000
2024	Pali Kitten	2	Kazushi Kimura	Douglas F. O'Neill	Robert A. Bambauer, James F. Cahill, Scott Knight, Robin A. & Richard Sutcliffe Jr., Kelli S. & Timothy Walsh	5 F (T)	0:56.11	$60,000
2023	Slider	2	Hector Berrios	John W. Sadler	Hall Racing LLC, Pearl Racing, West Point Thoroughbreds	5 F (T)	0.55.96	$60,000
2021	One Timer	2	E. T. Baird	Larry Rivelli	Patricia's Hope and Richard Ravin	5 F (T)	0:55.45	$60,000
2020	Amanzi Yimpilo	2	Luis Saez	Wesley A. Ward	Susan Moulton, Marc Detampel & CJ Thoroughbreds	5.5 F (T)	1:02.77	$60,000
2019	El Tigre Terrible	2	Ruben Fuentes	Peter L. Miller	Slam Dunk Racing (partnership) & Michel Nentwig	5 F	0:55.78	$60,000
2018	Its Gonna Hurt	2	Tiago Pereira	Bran Koriner	Janet Lyons, Evan, Andrew & Matthew Trommer	5 F	0:56.00	$60,000
2017	Beautiful Shot	2	Kent Desormeaux	J. Keith Desormeaux	Calumet Farm (Brad M. Kelley)	6 F	1:10.82	$43,080
2016	California Diamond	2	Kent Desormeaux	Peter L. Miller	Rockingham Ranch	6 F	1:10.96	$55,680
2015	Toews On Ice	2	Victor Espinoza	Bob Baffert	Karl Watson, Michael Pegram, Paul Weitman	6 F	1:09.74	$42,900
2014	Lord Nelson	2	Martin Garcia	Bob Baffert	Peachtree Stable	6 F	1:09.25	$60,000
2013	Can the Man	2	Martin Garcia	Bob Baffert	Kaleem Shah, Inc.	6 F	1:09.53	$60,000
2012	Merit Man	2	Pat Valenzuela	Robert B. Hess Jr.	Chandler, Double Kee LLC, Purple Shamrock Racing	6 F	1:10.56	$60,000
2011	Secret Circle	2	Rafael Bejarano	Bob Baffert	Karl Watson, Michael Pegram, Paul Weitman	6 F	1:08.27	$41,190
2010	Premier Pegasus	2	Alonso Quinonez	Myung Kwon Cho	Myung Kwon Cho	6 F	1:09.62	$35,400
2009	Macias	2	Garrett Gomez	Bob Baffert	Zayat Stables, LLC	6 F	1:08.98	$36,987
2008	Backbackbackgone	2	Rafael Bejarano	Peter L. Miller	Gerson Racing, Charleville Stables, John Rogitz	6 F	1:08.85	$48,060
2007	Wise Mandate	2	Corey Nakatani	Melvin F. Stute	Archa Racing, Inc.	6 F	1:08.42	$62,205
2006	Dilemma	2	Alex Solis	Patrick Gallagher	Glen Hill Farm	6 F	1:09.69	$41,652
2005	Within Reason	2	Martin Pedroza	Brian Koriner	Brian Koriner & Janet Lyons	6 F	1:09.19	$49,005
2004	Seattles Best Joe	2	Victor Espinoza	Howard E. Belvoir	Howard E. Belvoir, Dan Corby, Harley Hoppe	6 F	1:09.82	$48,915
2003	The Herc	2	Kent Desormeaux	Gary Stute	I. S. "Sam" Longo	6 F	1:09.51	$49,185
2002	Only the Best	2	Pat Valenzuela	Brian A. Lynch	Alvin E. Toffel	6 F	1:09.12	$63,360
2001	Roman Dancer	2	Kent Desormeaux	Christopher Paasch	Rod & Lorraine Rodriguez	6 F	1:08.66	$46,740
2000	Our Shining Hour	2	Kent Desormeaux	Howard Zucker	C. T. Grether, Inc.	6 F	1:09.76	$46,800
1999	Joopy Doopy	2	Victor Espinoza	Lewis Cenicola	Beth Clifton	6 F	1:08.82	$47,010
1998	Premier Property	2	David Flores	Bob Baffert	Hal Earnhardt	6 F	1:09.48	$47,040
1997	Race not held							
1996	Thisnearlywasmine	2	Chris McCarron	Randy Bradshaw	Jan, Mace & Samantha Siegel	6 F	1:08.55	$46,780
1995	Cobra King	2	Chris McCarron	Mike Puype	Betty Biszantz	6 F	1:09.10	$43,575
1994	Race not held							
1993	Subtle Trouble	2	Alex Solis	Melvin F. Stute	John Coelho & Pete Valenti	7 F	1:22.88	$45,900
1992	Race not held							
1991	Richard of England	2	Chris McCarron	D. Wayne Lukas	Clover Racing Stables, Corrigan, Crocket, et al.	7 F	1:23.37	$46,425
1990	Race not held							
1989	Pleasant Tap	2	Eddie Delahoussaye	Christopher Speckert	Buckland Farm	7 F	1:22.40	$46,525
1988	Race not held							
1987	Bold Second	2	Gary Baze	Charles E. Whittingham	William O. L. Seabaugh & Charles E. Whittingham	7 F	1:23.00	$39,500
1986	Race not held							
1985	Louisiana Slew	2	Pat Valenzuela	D. Wayne Lukas	John Enoul Jumonville Jr.	7 F	1:23.60	$49,600
1984	Matthew T. Parker	2	Eddie Delahoussaye	Robert J. Frankel	Jerry & Ann Moss	7 F	1:23.80	$41,350
1983	Vencimiento	2	Rafael Meza	Hector O. Palma	Granja Vista del Rio Stable	7 F	1:24.40	$38,300
1982	Desert Wine	2	Bill Shoemaker	Jerry M. Fanning	Cardiff Stud Farm & T90 Ranch (Dan Agnew)	7 F	1:22.60	$36,100
1981	Dena Jo	2	Chris McCarron	Robert J. Frankel	Ronald H. Semler	7 F	1:23.20	$33,100
1980	Partez	2	Terry Lipham	D. Wayne Lukas	Elizabeth Davis, Henry & Annabelle Greene	7 F	1:23.00	$32,250
1979	The Carpenter	2	Chris McCarron	Willard L. Proctor	Cardiff Stud Farm	7 F	1:21.20	$24,900
1978	Flying Paster	2	Donald Pierce	Gordon C. Campbell	Bernard J. Ridder	7 F	1:22.00	$24,750
1977	Misrepresentation	2	Jerry Lambert	Gordon C. Campbell	Bernard J. Ridder	7 F	1:22.40	$20,000
1976	Habitony	2	Bill Shoemaker	A. Thomas Doyle	Anton W. Pejsa	7 F	1:22.40	$19,100
1975	Thermal Energy	2	Bill Shoemaker	Charles E. Whittingham	E. E. Fogelson	7 F	1:22.80	$15,850
1974	George Navonod	2	Donald Pierce	Gordon C. Campbell	Navonod Stable	7 F	1:22.00	$18,100
1973	Such a Rush	2	Bill Shoemaker	Dale Landers	Hubert Joseph Miller	7 F	1:22.80	$17,350
1972	Ancient Title	2	Howard Grant	Keith L. Stucki Sr.	William & Ethel Kirkland	7 F	1:20.80	$17,450
1971	MacArthur Park	2	Bill Shoemaker	A. Thomas Doyle	Mark Three Stable	7 F	1:21.60	$16,400
1970	Jeanenes Lark	2	Bill Shoemaker	Jake J. Pletcher	J. H. Rose	7 F	1:23.60	$16,250
1969	Lord Adare	2	Fernando Alvarez	Hurst Philpot	Gurtacloona Stable	6.5 F (±)	1:13.60	$16,900
