= Cougar (horse) =

Chilean-bred Thoroughbred racehorse

- Sire: Tale of Two Cities
- Grandsire: Tehran
- Dam: Cindy Lou
- Damsire: Madara
- Sex: Stallion
- Foaled: 1966
- Country: Chile
- Colour: Dark Bay/Brown
- Breeder: Haras General Cruz
- Owner: 1. Perla de Chico Stud; 2. Mary F. Jones
- Trainer: Charlie Whittingham
- Record: 50: 20-7-17
- Earnings: $1,162,725

Major wins
- Cabrillo Handicap (1970); Clasico Municipal de Vina Del Mar (1970); Escondido Handicap (1970); Hollywood Invitational Turf Handicap (1971); Oak Tree Invitational Stakes (1971, 1972); Californian Handicap (1971, 1972)); San Gabriel Handicap (1971); San Juan Capistrano Handicap (1971); Carleton F. Burke Handicap (1972); Century Handicap (1972, 1973); San Marcos Stakes (1972); Santa Anita Handicap (1973); Sunset Handicap (1973)

Awards
- American Champion Male Turf Horse (1972)

Honours
- U.S. Racing Hall of Fame (2006); Cougar II Stakes at Del Mar Racetrack (2007– )
- Last updated on 23 September 2022

Cougar II (1966–1989) was a Chilean Thoroughbred racehorse who also competed in the United States, where he was inducted into the National Museum of Racing and Hall of Fame. Cougar was noted for his late running style and versatility, winning major stakes races on both dirt and turf. Following his relocation from Chile to the United States, he was registered as Cougar II.

== Background ==
Cougar was sired by Tale of Two Cities, a son of Tehran, winner of the 1944 St. Leger Stakes and the Leading sire in Great Britain & Ireland. He was muscular with a long tail that touched the ground, uncommon for most horses of this time.

== Racing career ==
Cougar raced in the late 1960s in Chile and was brought to the United States in 1970. He lost his first two U.S. starts but then won a race on the dirt followed by one on the turf. On future Hall of Fame inductee Charlie Whittingham's advice, Mary F. Jones then purchased the horse from Joe Hernandez for $125,000.

Conditioned by Whittingham, Cougar scored his first stakes win in the 1970 Escondido Handicap. In 1971, he won the San Juan Capistrano Handicap on grass over turf star Fort Marcy and defeated him again later in the season in the Ford Pinto Invitational Turf Handicap. In 1972, he won the Century Handicap, Oak Tree Invitational Stakes, and Carlton F. Burke Handicap en route to receiving the 1972 Eclipse Award as American Champion Male Turf Horse.

In 1973, Cougar won the Santa Anita Handicap on dirt after finishing second in that race the two previous years. He retired at the end of the season with over $1 million in earnings, making him the first foreign-bred horse to achieve that milestone in the U.S; his achievement was underlined by the fact that there had only been 13 equine millionaires by that time.

== Stud record ==
At stud, Cougar initially stood at Spendthrift Farm. He was later transferred to Stone Farm and sired his most famous offspring, Gato Del Sol, who won the 1982 Kentucky Derby. During his stallion career, Cougar produced 24 stakes winners. In June 1989, he died at the age of 23.

== Honors ==
In 2006, the Historic Review Committee of the National Museum of Racing's Hall of Fame selected Cougar II as a Hall of Fame inductee.

In his honor, Del Mar Racetrack renamed the Escondido Handicap the Cougar II Handicap in 2007.
