= Break Machine =

American hip hop group

- Origin: New York City
- Genres: Hip hop
- Years active: 1983–present
- Past members: Cortez Jordan; Keith Rodgers; Lindell Blake

Break Machine was an American rap act, fronted by Keith Rodgers and produced by Jacques Morali and Henri Belolo, the team behind the Village People.

== Career ==
Keith Rodgers was a musician and presenter of a rap radio show on the New York station WHBI 105.9. In 1981, he recorded a single, "Searching Rap" under the name 'Bon Rock'. This brought him to the attention of Morali and Belolo, the French producers, who were looking for new styles after the decline of disco. In 1983, together with Fred Zarr, they released "Street Dance", which was an international hit and one of the earliest mainstream breakthroughs for hip hop.

"Street Dance" peaked at #3 on the UK Singles Chart in March 1984, and was the 39th best-selling single of that year. It hit #1 in Sweden and Norway. In Germany, it was the 78th best-selling single of 1984. It charted #11 in Italy. "Street Dance" saw its strongest chart performance in Norway, where it was #1 for five weeks. In France, the song reached #1 for two weeks, selling over a million copies and becoming the 86th best-selling single of all time according to a list released in 2004 by the Syndicat National de l'Edition Phonographique

Subsequent singles "Break Dance Party" and "Are You Ready?" both reached the UK chart, peaking at number 9 and number 27 respectively. Their album, Break Machine, reached number 17 in the UK Albums Chart.

== Discography ==
=== Album ===
Year	Album	Label	UK
1984	Break Machine	Record Shack Records	17

=== Singles ===
Year	Song	Peak chart positions									
Year	Song	AUS	DEN	FIN	GER	IRE	NL	NOR	SWE	UK	US
1983	"Street Dance"	21	3	6	12	11	7	1	1	3	105
1984	"Break Dance Party"	73	4	11	―	13	―	3	6	9	―
1984	"Are You Ready?"	—	―	―	―	―	―	―	―	27	―
1988	"Tomorrow"	―	―	―	―	―	―	―	―	―	―
1993	"Now I Want You Back"	—	―	―	―	―	―	―	―	―	―
1998	"Sounds to Me"	—	―	―	―	―	―	―	―	―	―
2006	"A New Beginning"	—	―	―	―	―	―	―	―	―	―
2008	"I Want to Thank You"	―	―	―	―	―	―	―	―	―	―
2011	"Young Love"	―	―	―	―	―	―	―	―	―	―
2011	"I'll Be Standing Here"	―	―	―	―	―	―	―	―	―	―
2013	"Realize"	—	―	―	―	―	―	―	―	―	―
"—" denotes releases that did not chart.
