= Menotti Aristone =

American jockey

- Born: February 19, 1942; Camden, New Jersey
- Died: February 26, 2013 (aged 71); Shamong, New Jersey
- Occupation: jockey

Menotti John Aristone (February 19, 1942 – February 26, 2013) was an American jockey who raced in the 1975 Kentucky Derby on his horse Bombay Duck. He was leading by three lengths when someone in the infield threw a flying disc over his head. That caused the horse to shy back and then someone else in the infield threw a can of beer at the horse, hitting him in the hipbone, causing Aristone to throw in the towel.
