= Manuel Ycaza =

American jockey (1938–2018)

Personal information
- Born: February 1, 1938 Panama
- Died: July 16, 2018 (aged 80)
- Occupation: Jockey

Horse racing career
- Sport: Horse racing
- Career wins: 2,367

Major racing wins
- American Derby (1958); Santa Margarita Handicap (1958, 1964, 1968); Coaching Club American Oaks (1959, 1968); Jerome Handicap (1959); Kentucky Oaks (1959, 1960, 1963, 1968); Matron Stakes (1959); Saratoga Handicap (1959); Schuylerville Stakes (1959); Suburban Handicap (1959, 1964); Travers Stakes (1959, 1964); Washington, D.C. International (1959, 1960, 1967); Withers Stakes (1959, 1969); Alabama Stakes (1960); Aqueduct Handicap (1960); Arlington Handicap (1960); Bernard Baruch Handicap (1960, 1961, 1969); Metropolitan Handicap (1960); National Stallion Stakes (filly division) (1960); Astoria Stakes (1961, 1963, 1965); Champagne Stakes (1961, 1962, 1968); Belmont Futurity Stakes (1961, 1968); Gazelle Handicap (1961, 1966); Saratoga Special Stakes (1961, 1964); Arlington-Washington Lassie Stakes (1962); Blue Grass Stakes (1962); Florida Derby (1962); Frizette Stakes (1962, 1966); Lawrence Realization Stakes (1962, 1964); Queens County Handicap (1962, 1963); Tremont Stakes (1962, 1964); Vagrancy Handicap (1962); Ashland Stakes (1963); Beldame Stakes (1963); Dominion Day Stakes (1963); Great American Stakes (1963, 1969); Hopeful Stakes (1963, 1968); Firenze Handicap (1963); Santa Anita Oaks (1963); Santa Maria Handicap (1963, 1966, 1968); Spinster Stakes (1963); Santa Barbara Handicap (1963, 1965); Dwyer Stakes (1964); Comely Stakes (1964); Laurel Futurity (1964, 1969); Santa Ynez Stakes (1964, 1965); Fall Highweight Handicap (1965); Man O' War Stakes (1965); Santa Monica Handicap (1965); Strub Stakes (1965); Saranac Handicap (1966); Diana Handicap (1967); Gotham Stakes (1967); Acorn Stakes (1968); Breeders' Futurity (1967); Brooklyn Handicap (1968); Long Island Handicap (1968); Monmouth Oaks (1968); Mother Goose Stakes (1968); Adirondack Stakes (1969); Black Helen Handicap (1969); Juvenile Stakes (1969); Stars and Stripes Handicap (1969); Sanford Stakes (1971) Canadian Classic Race wins: Queen's Plate (1963); Breeders' Stakes (1963) American Classic Race wins: Belmont Stakes (1964)

Racing awards
- George Woolf Memorial Jockey Award (1964)

Honours
- United States Racing Hall of Fame (1977)

Significant horses
- Sword Dancer, Intentionally, Dark Mirage, Hill Rise, Gamely, Bald Eagle, Canebora, Never Bend, Silky Sullivan, Top Knight, Ack Ack, Tompion, Dr. Fager, Damascus; Quadrangle, Ridan, Lamb Chop, Fort Marcy
- Updated on July 9, 2007

Carlos Manuel De Ycaza (February 1, 1938 – July 16, 2018) was a Panamanian American jockey who led the way for Latin American jockeys in the United States.

De Ycaza began riding ponies at age six and by age fourteen was riding professionally in Panama. He went on to race in Mexico City before emigrating to the United States in 1956. Within a few years "Manny Ycaza" was winning major races at tracks all over the country. However, the hard-riding, fiery-tempered Ycaza was frequently in trouble with racing officials and despite his unquestioned ability, after major suspensions many owners and trainers were reluctant to hire him. However, stable owner Harry F. Guggenheim took a chance on Ycaza, hiring him for the 1959 racing season. Guggenheim's Cain Hoy Stable was one of the major Thoroughbred racing operations in the U.S. and Ycaza's ten-year affiliation with them saw him become one of the country's top jockeys and be voted the 1964 George Woolf Memorial Jockey Award by his peers.

An icon in his country of birth, Ycaza's success inspired other diminutive Panamanian youngsters to pursue a career as a jockey. In 1962, Sports Illustrated magazine published an article about the "Spanish invasion" of American Thoroughbred horse racing led by Ycaza.

== Major race accomplishments ==
In his first year with Cain Hoy Stable, Ycaza won the 1959 Washington, D.C. International aboard Bald Eagle then came back the following year to become the only back-to-back winner in the history of the prestigious international race. In the American Classic Races, Ycaza was second aboard Ridan in the 1962 Preakness Stakes, and in 1963 earned a second-place finish on Never Bend in the Kentucky Derby. Hired by prominent Canadian owner/breeder E. P. Taylor to ride for his Windfields Farm in the 1963 Queen's Plate, Ycaza won Canada's most prestigious race aboard the colt, Canebora. A year later, he ended E. P. Taylor's bid for the U.S. Triple Crown when he rode Quadrangle to victory in the 1964 Belmont Stakes over Derby and Preakness winner, Northern Dancer. In 1968 Manuel Ycaza rode Dark Mirage to the first ever Filly Triple Crown when they won the Acorn Stakes, Mother Goose Stakes and the Coaching Club American Oaks.

In 1971, injuries forced him into an early retirement but in 1983 he returned to competition, retiring for good the following year. During his career, Manuel Ycaza rode some of the great Thoroughbreds in American racing history and was a winner of 2,367 races with a 22.4 winning percentage. He was inducted in the National Museum of Racing and Hall of Fame in 1977.

== Personal life and death ==
A resident of Forest Hills, Queens, Ycaza was a longtime Major League Baseball fan and often attended New York Mets home games.

Ycaza died on July 16, 2018, at the age of 80. He is survived by his second wife Jeanne and two children Manuel Ycaza the third, and his daughter, Carla.
