= Street Dance (song) =

1983 single by Break Machine

Single by Break Machine

from the album Break Dance Party
- B-side: "Street Dance" (instrumental)
- Released: December 1983
- Studio: Power Station (New York City)
- Genre: Electro; freestyle; hip hop; pop-soul
- Length: 3:42 (7-inch version); 6:26 (12-inch and album version)
- Label: Sire (US); Record Shack (UK)
- Songwriters: Jacques Morali; Fred Zarr; Henri Belolo; Keith Rodgers
- Producer: Jacques Morali

Break Machine singles chronology
"Street Dance" (1983)	"Break Dance Party" (1984)

"Street Dance" is a song by American hip hop act Break Machine, released as their debut single in 1983, from their album Break Dance Party (released as Break Machine in the UK). It became an international hit, topping the charts in several countries as well as peaking at number three on the UK Singles Chart. It was one of the first commercially successful hip hop songs and was produced and co-written by Jacques Morali and Henri Belolo who were also behind disco group Village People. According to a list released in 2004 by the SNEP, the song was the 86th-best-selling single of all time in France.

== Music video ==
The music video features the act popping and breakdancing around the streets of New York City.

== Track listings ==
7-inch

1. "Street Dance" (Vocal) – 3:42
2. "Street Dance" (Instrumental) – 3:32

12-inch

1. "Street Dance" (Vocal) – 6:28
2. "Street Dance" (Instrumental) – 5:06

== Charts ==
=== Weekly charts ===
Chart (1984)	Peak position
Australia (Kent Music Report)	21
Austria (Ö3 Austria Top 40)	17
Belgium (Ultratop 50 Flanders)	7
Denmark (IFPI)	3
Europe (European Hot 100 Singles)	1
European Airplay Top 60 (Music & Media)	1
Finland (Suomen virallinen lista)	6
France (IFOP)	1
Iceland (Rás 2)	4
Ireland (IRMA)	11
Italy (Musica e dischi)	7
Netherlands (Dutch Top 40)	14
Netherlands (Single Top 100)	7
Norway (VG-lista)	1
Spain (AFYVE)	1
Sweden (Sverigetopplistan)	1
Switzerland (Schweizer Hitparade)	7
UK Singles (OCC)	3
US Bubbling Under Hot 100 (Billboard)	5
US Dance/Disco Top 80 (Billboard)	6
US Hot Black Singles (Billboard)	78
West Germany (GfK)	12

=== Year-end charts ===
Chart (1984)	Position
Belgium (Ultratop)	86
France (IFOP)	5
UK Singles (OCC)	42

== Certifications ==
Region	Certification	Certified units/sales
France (SNEP)	Gold	500,000^{*}
^{*} Sales figures based on certification alone.

== Sampling ==
In 1998, German group Scooter sampled the song in "We Are the Greatest". In 2011, Swedish house DJ Avicii sampled the song in "Street Dancer".
