= Street Dancer =

Single by Avicii
- Released: 17 January 2011
- Recorded: 2010–2011
- Genre: Progressive house
- Length: 6:57 (original mix); 3:27 (radio edit)
- Label: Vicious; Spinnin'; Ultra Records
- Songwriters: Tim Bergling, Jacques Morali, Henri Belolo, Fred Zarr, Keith Rodgers
- Producer: Avicii

Avicii singles chronology
"Tweet It" (2010)	"Street Dancer" (2011)	"iTrack" (2011)

Audio
- "Street Dancer (Radio Edit)" on YouTube

"Street Dancer" is a song by Swedish house producer and DJ Avicii. It was released on 17 January 2011 in South Africa, 26 February 2011 in the Netherlands, 29 March 2011 in the US, and on 5 June 2011 in the UK. It was written by Avicii and samples the Break Machine's 1983 breakdance hit "Street Dance".

== Track listing ==
US edition digital download
No.	Title	Length
1.	"Street Dancer" (Radio Edit)	3:27
2.	"Street Dancer" (Original Mix)	6:57
3.	"Street Dancer" (Tristan Garner Remix)	6:30
4.	"Street Dancer" (Two Fresh Remix)	6:05
5.	"Street Dancer" (Sneaker Fox Remix)	5:46
6.	"Street Dancer" (Midnite Sleaze Remix)	5:31

UK edition digital download
No.	Title	Length
1.	"Street Dancer" (Radio Edit)	3:27
2.	"Street Dancer" (Delta Heavy Remix)	5:56
3.	"Street Dancer" (Whelan and Di Scala Remix)	6:21
4.	"Street Dancer" (Kenny Hayes Remix)	5:31
5.	"Street Dancer" (Two Fresh Remix)	6:05

Dutch edition digital download
No.	Title	Length
1.	"Street Dancer" (Radio Mix)	2:59
2.	"Street Dancer" (Original Mix)	6:57

== Charts ==
Chart (2011)	Peak position
Netherlands (Dutch Top 40)	33
Netherlands (Single Top 100)	67

== Release history ==
Region	Date	Format	Label
South Africa	17 January 2011	Digital download	Vicious
Netherlands	26 February 2011	Digital download	Spinnin'
United States	29 March 2011	Digital download	Vicious
United Kingdom	5 June 2011	Digital download	Vicious
