= Arthur A. Seeligson Jr. =

- Born: Arthur Addison Seeligson Jr. October 29, 1920; San Antonio, Texas; United States
- Died: April 17, 2001 (aged 80); San Antonio, Texas
- Education: Phillips Exeter Academy; Yale University
- Occupations: Oilman, rancher Racehorse owner/breeder
- Political party: Republican
- Board member of: National Bank of Commerce, St. Mary's Hall School, Cambridge Royalty Company, University of Texas Marine Science Institute, Smithsonian Institution National Board of Associates, Phillips Exeter Academy
- Spouse: Linda Nixon
- Children: Ramona, Juliana, Arthur III
- Parent(s): Arthur A. Seeligson; Ramona Frates

Arthur Addison Seeligson Jr. (October 29, 1920 - April 17, 2001) was an American oilman, rancher, and a Thoroughbred racehorse owner/breeder.

== Family ==
Seeligson was born in San Antonio, Texas, the son of Ramona (née Frates) and Arthur Addison Seeligson Sr. His paternal great-grandfather, Henry Seeligson, was a Jewish Confederate soldier whose father served as mayor of Galveston, Texas. Through his great-grandfather, Seeligson was a relative of composer Louis Moreau Gottschalk. Arthur Seeligson's brother, Frates Slick Seeligson (1923-2006), was a rancher and a member of the Texas House of Representatives from 1953 to 1960. His first cousin, once removed, Lamar Smith has been a Republican Congressman from Texas since 1987.

== Early life ==
Arthur Seeligson was raised a Protestant. His family moved to Oklahoma when he was still a boy. After studying at Phillips Exeter Academy in Exeter, New Hampshire and then graduating from Yale University in 1942, Arthur Seeligson Jr. followed in his fathers footsteps as a successful investor in the oil and gas industry in Kansas.

Seeligson returned to live in San Antonio and it was his home at the time of his death in 2001.

== Thoroughbred horse racing ==
Arthur Seeligson was involved in Thoroughbred horse racing for more than forty years. He had stakes race winners both in the United States and in Europe. He most notably bred and raced Avatar, winner of the 1975 Santa Anita Derby and the American Classic, the Belmont Stakes.

For a time, Arthur Seeligson was a co-owner of the now defunct Hialeah Park Race Track in Hialeah, Florida. He was a member of the board of directors of the National Museum of Racing and Hall of Fame in Saratoga Springs, New York. Seeligson's daughter, Ramona Seeligson Bass, was a driving force behind the creation of Texas Wild! at the Fort Worth Zoo. The Zoo's Arthur A. Seeligson Conservation Fund was established by his family and friends to benefit Texas wildlife.
