= Master Derby =

American Thoroughbred racehorse

- Sire: Dust Commander
- Grandsire: Bold Commander
- Dam: Madam Jerry
- Damsire: Royal Coinage
- Sex: Stallion
- Foaled: 1972
- Country: United States
- Colour: Chestnut
- Breeder: Robert E. Lehmann
- Owner: Golden Chance Farm
- Trainer: William E. "Smiley" Adams
- Record: 33: 16-8-4
- Earnings: $698,625

Major wins
- Kindergarten Stakes (1974); Dragoon Stakes (1974); Louisiana Derby Trial Stakes (1975); Louisiana Derby (1975); Calumet Purse (1975); Blue Grass Stakes (1975); New Orleans Handicap (1976); Louisiana Handicap (1976); Oaklawn Handicap (1976) Triple Crown Race wins: Preakness Stakes (1975)

Awards
- Leading broodmare sire in Britain & Ireland (1991)

Honours
- Fair Grounds Racing Hall of Fame (1992)
- Last updated on 2 April 2021

Master Derby (April 24, 1972 – January 22, 1999) was an American Thoroughbred racehorse best known for winning the 1975 Preakness Stakes.

== Background ==
He was bred by Robert E. Lehmann at his Golden Chance Farm in Paris, Kentucky. Master Derby was out of the mare Madam Jerry, and sired by Lehmann's 1970 Kentucky Derby winner, Dust Commander.

== Racing career ==
=== 1974: Two-year-old season ===
Conditioned for racing by trainer Smiley Adams, at age two Master Derby made twelve starts, finishing either first or second in all of them. His best stakes race results were wins in the Grade 3 Kindergarten Stakes, a sprint race at Keystone Racetrack, and a division of the Grade 3 Dragoon Stakes at Liberty Bell Park Racetrack. He also earned a second-place finish in the important 1974 Breeders' Futurity Stakes and the Kentucky Jockey Club Stakes.

=== 1975: Three-year-old season ===
Racing as a three-year-old, Master Derby began his season with two straight losses in six-furlong sprints but then won the much longer 1 ^{1}/16 miles Louisiana Derby Trial Stakes and the 1 1/8 miles (1.8 km) Louisiana Derby. Aimed for the Kentucky Derby, from his base in Louisiana his handlers shipped him to Keeneland Race Course in Kentucky, where jockey Darrel McHargue rode him to victory in the Calumet Purse and the Blue Grass Stakes.

With McHargue as his rider in the 1975 U.S. Triple Crown races, Master Derby ran fourth in the Kentucky Derby to the heavily favored winner Foolish Pleasure, then won the Preakness Stakes before finishing third in the Belmont Stakes to winner Avatar.

=== 1976: Four-year-old season ===
At age four, Master Derby won the 1976 New Orleans, Louisiana, and Oaklawn Handicaps, and ran second in the Metropolitan Handicap to Hall of Fame inductee Forego.

== Stud record ==
Retired to stud duty, Master Derby met with some success as a sire. The most notable of his progeny in racing was the Grade I winner Uptown Swell, who earned just under $1 million for owner Virginia Kraft Payson. However, his daughter Doff The Derby produced Generous, whose 1991 Group One victories in England and Ireland included the Epsom and Irish Derbys and whose earnings helped make Master Derby the 1991 Leading broodmare sire in Great Britain & Ireland.

In 1992, Master Derby was inducted into the Fair Grounds Racing Hall of Fame.

In January 1999, due to the infirmities of old age, the twenty-seven-year-old Master Derby was humanely euthanized at Notjustanother Farm in Chino, California.

== Breeding ==
Pedigree of Master Derby
Sire Dust Commander ch. 1967	Bold Commander bay 1960	Bold Ruler	Nasrullah
Sire Dust Commander ch. 1967	Bold Commander bay 1960	Bold Ruler	Miss Disco
Sire Dust Commander ch. 1967	Bold Commander bay 1960	High Voltage	Ambiorix
Sire Dust Commander ch. 1967	Bold Commander bay 1960	High Voltage	Dynamo
Sire Dust Commander ch. 1967	Dust Storm ch. 1956	Windy City	Wyndham
Sire Dust Commander ch. 1967	Dust Storm ch. 1956	Windy City	Staunton
Sire Dust Commander ch. 1967	Dust Storm ch. 1956	Challure	Challedon
Sire Dust Commander ch. 1967	Dust Storm ch. 1956	Challure	Captivation
Dam Madam Jerry ch. 1961	Royal Coinage bay 1952	Eight Thirty	Pilate
Dam Madam Jerry ch. 1961	Royal Coinage bay 1952	Eight Thirty	Dinner Time
Dam Madam Jerry ch. 1961	Royal Coinage bay 1952	Canina	Bull Dog
Dam Madam Jerry ch. 1961	Royal Coinage bay 1952	Canina	Coronium
Dam Madam Jerry ch. 1961	Our Kretchen ch. 1955	Crafty Admiral	Fighting Fox
Dam Madam Jerry ch. 1961	Our Kretchen ch. 1955	Crafty Admiral	Admiral Lady
Dam Madam Jerry ch. 1961	Our Kretchen ch. 1955	Adjournment	Court Martial
Dam Madam Jerry ch. 1961	Our Kretchen ch. 1955	Adjournment	Blank Day
