= Last Tycoon Stakes =

Inglewood Handicap
- Class: Grade III
- Location: Hollywood Park Racetrack; Inglewood, California, United States
- Inaugurated: 1938
- Race type: Thoroughbred - Flat racing
- Website: www.hollywoodpark.com

Race information
- Distance: 1 1/16 miles (8.5 furlongs)
- Surface: Turf
- Track: Left-handed
- Qualification: Three-year-olds & up
- Weight: Assigned
- Purse: $100,000

The Last Tycoon Stakes (formerly known as the Inglewood Handicap) is an American Thoroughbred horse race run annually in late April at Hollywood Park Racetrack in Inglewood, California. First run in 1938, the race is open to horses three years old and up. A Grade III stakes, it is raced on turf at a distance of 1 1/16 miles (8.5 Furlongs). The event currently offers a purse of $100,000.

The Last Tycoon Stakes was run in two divisions in 1975, 1976, 1978, and 1979.

The race was increased in length to 1 and 1/8th mile in 2012.

== Records ==
Most wins:

- 3 - Native Diver (1963, 1964, 1966)

== Winners since 1999 ==
| Year | Winner | Age | Jockey | Trainer | Owner | Time |
|---|---|---|---|---|---|---|
| 2015 | Si Sage | 5 | Elvis Trujillo | Darrell Vienna | Red Baron's Barn LLC, Rancho Temescal & Vayaconsuerte, LLC | 2:02.08 |
| 2014 | Quick Casablanca | 6 | Joe Talamo | Ronald L. McAnally | Pablo Gomez | 1:48.62 |
| 2013 | no race | | | | | |
| 2012 | Utopian | 5 | Mike E. Smith | John Shirreffs | Jerry & Ann Moss | 1:48.73 |
| 2011 | Liberian Freighter | 6 | Martin Garcia | Neil Drysdale | King Eward Racing Stable/Dugan/Winner | 1:39.70 |
| 2010 | Gallant Son | 4 | Mike E. Smith | Frank Lucarelli | Chris & Diane Randall | 1:39.67 |
| 2009 | Madeo | 4 | Mike E. Smith | John Shirreffs | Jerry & Ann Moss | 1:42.04 |
| 2008 | El Roblar | 6 | Victor Espinoza | Richard Mandella | Stonestreet Stables | 1:40.35 |
| 2007 | After Market | 4 | Alex Solis | John Shirreffs | Pam & Martin Wygod | 1:39.63 |
| 2006 | Willow O Wisp | 4 | Victor Espinoza | Vladimir Cerin | Robert Alexander | 1:39.05 |
| 2005 | King of Happiness | 6 | Pat Valenzuela | Neil D. Drysdale | Sheikh Maktoum | 1:40.67 |
| 2004 | Leroidesanimaux | 4 | Jon Court | Robert J. Frankel | Stud TNT | 1:38.45 |
| 2003 | Gondolieri | 4 | Frank Alvarado | Ron McAnally | Nelson Bunker Hunt | 1:40.32 |
| 2002 | Night Patrol | 6 | Victor Espinoza | Nick Canani | Everest Stables Inc. | 1:39.35 |
| 2001 | Fateful Dream | 4 | David Flores | Robert J. Frankel | Edmund A. Gann | 1:41.65 |
| 2000 | Montemiro | 6 | Victor Espinoza | Darrell Vienna | Red Baron's Barn | 1:40.71 |
| 1999 | Brave Act | 5 | Goncalino Almeida | Ron McAnally | Sidney H. Craig | 1:39.13 |

== Earlier winners ==
- 1997 - El Angelo
- 1996 - Fastness
- 1995 - Blaze O'Brien
- 1994 - Gothland
- 1993 - The Tender Track
- 1992 - Golden Pheasant
- 1991 - Tight Spot
- 1990 - Mohamed Abdu
- 1989 - Steinlen
- 1988 - Steinlen
- 1987 - Le Belvedere
- 1986 - Zoffany
- 1985 - Al Mamoon
- 1984 - Royal Heroine
- 1983 - Bold Style
- 1982 - Maipon
- 1981 - Bold Tropic
- 1980 - Red Crescent
- 1979 - Johnny's Image
- 1979 - Star Spangled
- 1978 - Star Spangled
- 1978 - Star of Erin
- 1977 - Today N Tomorrow
- 1976 - Riot In Paris
- 1976 - King Pellinore
- 1975 - El Botija
- 1975 - Gay Style
- 1974 - Shirley's Champion
- 1973 - Ancient Title
- 1972 - War Heim
- 1971 - Advance Guard
- 1970 - Baffle
- 1969 - Rising Market
- 1968 - Gamely
- 1967 - Quicken Tree
- 1967 - Pretense
- 1966 - Native Diver
- 1965 - Tronado
- 1964 - Native Diver
- 1963 - Native Diver
- 1962 - Prove It
- 1961 - Sea Orbit
- 1960 - Bagdad
- 1959 - Bug Brush
- 1958 - Eddie Schmidt
- 1957 - Find
- 1956 - Swaps
- 1955 - Determine
- 1954 - High Scud
- 1953 - Pet Bully
- 1952 - Sturdy One
- 1951 - Sturdy One
- 1950 - Miche
- 1949 - Ace Admiral
- 1948 - With Pleasure
- 1947 - Artillery
- 1946 - Quick Reward
- 1945 - High Resolve
- 1941 - Sir Jeffrey
- 1940 - Historical
- 1939 - Specify
- 1938 - Ligaroti
