= Lamb Chop (horse) =

American-bred Thoroughbred racehorse

- Sire: Bold Ruler
- Grandsire: Nasrullah
- Dam: Sheepsfoot
- Damsire: Count Fleet
- Sex: Filly
- Foaled: 1960
- Country: United States
- Colour: Chestnut
- Breeder: Claiborne Farm
- Owner: William Haggin Perry
- Trainer: James W. Maloney
- Record: 23: 12-5-4
- Earnings: US$324,032

Major wins
- Coaching Club American Oaks (1963); Monmouth Oaks (1963); Spinster Stakes (1963); Firenze Handicap (1963); Gazelle Handicap (1963); Santa Susana Stakes (1963); Jersey Belle Stakes (1963); Comely Stakes (1963); La Centinela Stakes (1963)

Awards
- American Champion Three-Year-Old Filly (1963)

Honours
- Aiken Thoroughbred Racing Hall of Fame (1977)

Lamb Chop (April 9, 1960–1964) was an American Thoroughbred Champion racehorse. Bred by Bull Hancock's renowned Claiborne Farm, she was sired by Bold Ruler, an eight-time leading sire in North America and grandson of Nearco. Her dam, Sheepsfoot, was a daughter of the 1943 U.S. Triple Crown champion Count Fleet.

Purchased by prominent horseman William Haggin Perry, at age three, Lamb Chop won almost every major American graded stakes race for fillies in her age group, and was voted the 1963 American Champion Three-Year-Old Filly. Among her wins were races from six furlongs to one and a quarter miles, which included a new Garden State Park track record for one-and-a-sixteenth miles on dirt in winning the Jersey Belle Stakes.

In 1964, Lamb Chop took on her male counterparts in the San Fernando Stakes and finished second to the future U.S. Racing Hall of Fame inductee Gun Bow. She went up against Gun Bow and other males again in the 1964 Strub Stakes at Santa Anita Park, but broke down during the race and had to be euthanized. She was buried at Santa Anita in an area located west of the track. In 1970, Quicken Tree was buried next to her.

Following its formation, Lamb Chop was inducted into the Aiken Thoroughbred Racing Hall of Fame in 1977.
