= Foolish Pleasure =

American-bred Thoroughbred racehorse

- Foolish Pleasure in 1980
- Sire: What a Pleasure
- Grandsire: Bold Ruler
- Dam: Fool Me Not
- Damsire: Tom Fool
- Sex: Stallion
- Foaled: March 23, 1972; Williston, Florida, U.S.
- Died: November 17, 1994 (aged 22); Dayton, Wyoming, U.S.
- Country: United States
- Colour: Bay
- Breeder: Waldemar Farms, Inc.
- Owner: John L. Greer
- Trainer: LeRoy Jolley
- Record: 26: 16-4-3
- Earnings: $1,216,705

Major wins
- Champagne Stakes (1974); Hopeful Stakes (1974); Tremont Stakes (1974); Cowdin Stakes (1974); Flamingo Stakes (1975); Wood Memorial Stakes (1975); Donn Handicap (1976); Suburban Handicap (1976); Arlington Golden Invitational Handicap (1976) Triple Crown Race wins: Kentucky Derby (1975)

Awards
- U.S. Champion 2-Yr-Old Colt (1974)

Honours
- United States Racing Hall of Fame (1995) #97 - Top 100 U.S. Racehorses of the 20th Century; Foolish Pleasure Stakes at Calder Race Course
- Last updated on September 30, 2008

Foolish Pleasure (March 23, 1972 – November 17, 1994) was an American bay Thoroughbred race horse who won the 1975 Kentucky Derby.

== Background ==
Foolish Pleasure was a bay horse bred at Williston, Florida by Waldemar Farms, Inc. He was owned by John L. Greer and trained by LeRoy Jolley, who had previously been partners in the colt Ridan. He was sired by What A Pleasure, who won the Hopeful Stakes in 1967 before becoming a successful breeding stallion. His dam, Fool-Me-Not, was descended from the British broodmare Becti (foaled 1929), who was the female-line ancestor of many major winners including Mrs McArdy, Borgia, and Boreal.

== Racing career ==
Foolish Pleasure was undefeated as a two-year-old. In 1975, at age three, he won the Flamingo Stakes and Wood Memorial Stakes before contesting the Kentucky Derby. Ridden by Jacinto Vásquez, he raced well off the pace on the inside before making a forward move approaching the final turn. He was switched to the outside in the straight and produced a strong late burst to win from Avatar.

Although heavily favored to win, Foolish Pleasure finished second to Master Derby in the Preakness. He then finished runner-up to Avatar in the Belmont Stakes.

In July 1975, a match race was arranged between Foolish Pleasure and the unbeaten filly Ruffian. Vásquez chose to ride Ruffian, with Braulio Baeza taking over on Foolish Pleasure. While on the lead, Ruffian broke down, allowing Foolish Pleasure to win unchallenged.

Foolish Pleasure remained in training as a four-year-old and won the Donn Handicap and Suburban Handicap.

== Retirement ==
Foolish Pleasure was placed at Greentree Stud after being syndicated for US$4.5 million. He later spent time at Mint Lane Farm and Spendthrift Farm in Kentucky before being moved out to Kerr Stock Farm in California. He was purchased by Ron Vanderhoef in September 1993 and moved to Horseshoe Ranch in Dayton, Wyoming, where he remained until he died from a gastric rupture on November 17, 1994.

Foolish Pleasure was inducted into the National Museum of Racing and Hall of Fame in 1995. In the Blood Horse magazine ranking of the top 100 U.S. thoroughbred champions of the 20th Century, he was ranked #97.

== Pedigree ==
Pedigree of Foolish Pleasure (USA), bay horse, 1972
Sire What A Pleasure (USA) 1965	Bold Ruler (USA); 1954	Nasrullah	Nearco
Sire What A Pleasure (USA) 1965	Bold Ruler (USA); 1954	Nasrullah	Mumtaz Begum
Sire What A Pleasure (USA) 1965	Bold Ruler (USA); 1954	Miss Disco	Discovery
Sire What A Pleasure (USA) 1965	Bold Ruler (USA); 1954	Miss Disco	Outdone
Sire What A Pleasure (USA) 1965	Grey Flight (USA); 1945	Mahmoud	Blenheim
Sire What A Pleasure (USA) 1965	Grey Flight (USA); 1945	Mahmoud	Mah Mahal
Sire What A Pleasure (USA) 1965	Grey Flight (USA); 1945	Planetoid	Ariel
Sire What A Pleasure (USA) 1965	Grey Flight (USA); 1945	Planetoid	La Chica
Dam Fool-Me-Not (USA) 1958	Tom Fool (USA); 1949	Menow	Pharamond
Dam Fool-Me-Not (USA) 1958	Tom Fool (USA); 1949	Menow	Alcibiades
Dam Fool-Me-Not (USA) 1958	Tom Fool (USA); 1949	Gaga	Bull Dog
Dam Fool-Me-Not (USA) 1958	Tom Fool (USA); 1949	Gaga	Alpoise
Dam Fool-Me-Not (USA) 1958	Cuadrilla (FR); 1943	Tourbillon	Ksar
Dam Fool-Me-Not (USA) 1958	Cuadrilla (FR); 1943	Tourbillon	Durban
Dam Fool-Me-Not (USA) 1958	Cuadrilla (FR); 1943	Boullabaisse	Blenheim
Dam Fool-Me-Not (USA) 1958	Cuadrilla (FR); 1943	Boullabaisse	Becti (Family: 14-b)

- Foolish Pleasure was inbred 4 × 4 to Blenheim, meaning that this stallion appears twice in the fourth generation of his pedigree.

== See also ==
- List of racehorses
