= Louis R. Rowan =

American businessman (1911–1988)

- Born: September 27, 1911; California, United States
- Died: September 28, 1988 (aged 77); Pasadena, California
- Occupation(s): Businessman; Racehorse owner/breeder
- Known for: Co-founder: Oak Tree Racing Association
- Honors: Louis R. Rowan Fellowship in Equine Studies at the University of California, Davis; Louis R. Rowan Handicap at Santa Anita Park

Louis R. Rowan (September 27, 1911 – September 28, 1988) was an American businessman and Thoroughbred racehorse owner and breeder.

A native of California, Rowan was educated in England. In 1968, along with Clement L. Hirsch and Dr. Jack Robbins, he co-founded the Oak Tree Racing Association at Santa Anita Park in Arcadia, California. Rowan was also a co-founder of the California Thoroughbred Foundation.

Louis Rowan bred and raced a number of successful horses. Among them were:

- Mrs. Rabbit, winner of the 1948 Santa Anita Oaks;
- Spinney, winner of the 1957 Santa Anita Maturity and the Canadian Championship Stakes;
- Ruken, winner of the 1966 Del Mar Futurity and the 1967 Santa Anita Derby;
- Quicken Tree - outstanding marathon distance runner whose wins included the Jockey Club Gold Cup, Manhattan Handicap, Santa Anita Handicap, San Juan Capistrano Invitational Handicap, and two editions of the Display Handicap.

In his memory, the California Thoroughbred Foundation established the Louis R. Rowan Fellowship in Equine Studies at the University of California, Davis. Named in his honor, the Louis R. Rowan Stakes was run from 1988 to 1998 at Santa Anita Park.

Louis Rowan was living in Pasadena, California at the time of his death in 1988.
