= Avatar (horse) =

American-bred Thoroughbred racehorse

- Sire: Graustark
- Grandsire: Ribot
- Dam: Brown Berry
- Damsire: Mount Marcy
- Sex: Stallion
- Foaled: 1972–1992
- Country: United States
- Colour: Chestnut
- Breeder: Arthur A. Seeligson Jr.
- Owner: Arthur A. Seeligson Jr.
- Trainer: A. Thomas Doyle
- Record: 33: 9-7-2
- Earnings: $464,609

Major wins
- Santa Anita Derby (1975); San Luis Rey Handicap (1976) Triple Crown race wins: Belmont Stakes (1975)

Avatar (March 10, 1972 – December 3, 1992) was an American Thoroughbred racehorse best known for winning the 1975 Belmont Stakes. He was bred and raced by San Antonio, Texas businessman Arthur A. Seeligson Jr. and trained by Tommy Doyle.

== Pedigree ==
Avatar's sire was the highly regarded Graustark. His grandsire, Ribot, was an undefeated European Champion who won back-to-back editions of the Prix de l'Arc de Triomphe. Avatar's damsire, Mount Marcy, was a son of Epsom Derby winner, Mahmoud.

== 1975 U.S. Triple Crown ==
Although Avatar won the Grade I Santa Anita Derby under jockey Jorge Tejeira, a strong field in the 1975 Kentucky Derby saw bettors make him their fifth choice at odds of more than 11 to 1. Under new jockey Bill Shoemaker, he finished second to the heavy favorite, Foolish Pleasure while beating Frank McMahon's highly regarded colt Diabolo (3rd), Golden Chance Farm's Master Derby (4th), and the second choice among bettors, Darby Dan Farm's Florida Derby winner Prince Thou Art (6th).

In the ensuing Preakness Stakes, Avatar moved with the leaders as the turned for home but faded to finish fifth behind upset winner Master Derby.

=== The Belmont Stakes ===
After his performance in the 1 3/16 mi (1.9 km) Preakness, Avatar was sent off at 13 to 1 odds in the much longer 1 1/2 mi (2.4 km) Belmont Stakes. In what Sports Illustrated magazine described as "a pure and exquisite exhibition of the professional jockey at his very best", Bill Shoemaker rode him to victory over runner-up Foolish Pleasure and third-place finisher Master Derby.

== Racing at age 4 ==
Avatar returned to racing in 1976 at age four. His best results in important stakes races were a win in the 12 furlong San Luis Rey Handicap on turf and second-place finishes in the Hollywood Gold Cup, Del Mar Invitational Handicap, and San Fernando Stakes.

== At Stud ==
Retired to stud for the 1977 season, Avatar was the sire of 19 stakes winners including 1983 Canadian Champion Two-Year-Old Colt Prince Avatar. Avatar died in 1992 due to a broken neck.

From his daughter Avasand's mating to English Group One winner, Northern Baby, came Possibly Perfect, a multiple Grade I winner and 1995 American Champion Female Turf Horse
