= Junior Miss Stakes =

The Junior Miss Stakes was an American flat Thoroughbred horse race for two-year-old fillies held annually at Del Mar Racetrack in Del Mar, California from 1952 through 1992. It was run as a Grade III race over a distance of 6 furlongs on dirt.

== Winners since 1970 ==
- 1992 - Best Dress
- 1991 - Soviet Sojourn
- 1990 - Cuddles
- 1989 - A Wild Ride
- 1988 - Executive Row
- 1987 - Sheesham
- 1986 - Footy
- 1985 - Wee Lavaliere
- 1984 - Doon's Baby
- 1983 - Yolanda
- 1982 - Some Kinda Flirt
- 1981 - Buy My Act
- 1980 - Sweet Amends
- 1979 - Hazel R.
- 1978 - Joi'ski
- 1977 - Illustrious Girl
- 1976 - Lullaby
- 1975 - Doc Shah's Siren
- 1974 - Miss Tokyo
- 1973 - Fleet Peach
- 1972 - Rosalie Mae Wynn
- 1971 - Chargerette
- 1970 - Conniving Princess
