= Oak Tree Racing Association =

American nonprofit association

The Oak Tree Racing Association is an American nonprofit corporation that exists to conduct live thoroughbred horse racing in Southern California.

== Graded Stakes races at the Oak Tree meet ==
Since Oak Tree Racing moved to Hollywood Park in 2010, some of these races have been renamed by Santa Anita Park now that its lease with Oak Tree Racing Association has expired.

- Ancient Title Stakes (renamed the Santa Anita Sprint Championship)
- Clement L. Hirsch Turf Championship Stakes (renamed the John Henry Turf Championship)
- Goodwood Stakes (renamed the Awesome Again Stakes)
- Harold C. Ramser Sr. Handicap (renamed the Autumn Miss Stakes)
- Lady's Secret Stakes (renamed the Zenyatta Stakes)
- Las Palmas Handicap (renamed the Goldikova Stakes)
- Morvich Handicap (renamed the Eddie D Stakes)
- Norfolk Stakes (renamed the FrontRunner Stakes)
- Oak Leaf Stakes (renamed the Chandelier Stakes)
- Oak Tree Derby (renamed the Twilight Derby)
- Oak Tree Mile (renamed the City of Hope Mile)
- Senator Ken Maddy Stakes
- Yellow Ribbon Stakes (renamed the Rodeo Drive Stakes)

== Track announcers ==
- Terry Gilligan (1969-circa 1976)
- Alan Buchdahl (circa 1976-1982)
- Trevor Denman (1983-2009)
- Vic Stauffer (2010)
