= My Charmer Stakes =

- Class: Ungraded stakes
- Location: Gulfstream Park, Hallandale Beach, Florida
- Inaugurated: 1984
- Race type: Thoroughbred - Flat racing

Race information
- Distance: 1-1/16 miles (8 1/2 furlongs)
- Surface: Turf
- Track: Left-handed
- Qualification: fillies & mares, 3 years old & up
- Purse: US$75,000

The My Charmer Handicap is an American ungraded Thoroughbred horse race run annually on the turf course at Gulfstream Park West in Hallandale Beach, Florida.

Open to fillies and mares three-years-old and up, it is set at a distance of one and one-eighth miles (9 furlongs) and currently offers a purse of $100,000.

The My Charmer is the first of four $100,000 stakes on Calder's Grand Slam I card, along with the Three Ring Stakes, the Foolish Pleasure Stakes, and Grade 3 Tropical Turf Handicap.

This race is named for My Charmer, the dam of U.S. Triple Crown champion, Seattle Slew. She also produced the important European sire Seattle Dancer who had sold as a yearling at the Keeneland Sales for US$13.1 million, the highest amount ever paid for a yearling at public auction. As well, My Charmer produced Lomond, the 1983 winner of the British Classic, the 2,000 Guineas.

In 2015 this race was run at Gulfstream Park West at a distance of one and one-sixteenth miles.

== Past winners ==
- 2017 On Leave (Irad Ortiz Jr)
- 2016 - Isabella Sings (Edgard J. Zayas)
- 2015 - Lady Lara (IRE) (Jose Lezcano)
- 2014 - Daring Kathy (Abdiel Jaen)
- 2013 - Valiant Girl (GB) (Matthew Rispoli)
- 2012 - Kya One (FR) (Paco Lopez)
- 2011 - Oregon Lady (Paco Lopez)
- 2010 - Askbut I Won'ttell (Shaun Bridgmohan)
- 2009 - no race
- 2008 - Wild Promises (Aaron Gryder)
- 2007 – J'ray (4) (Manoel Cruz)
- 2006 – Amorama (5) (Manoel Cruz)
- 2005 – Snowdrops (5) (Brice Blanc)
- 2004 – Something Ventured (5) (John Velazquez)
- 2003 – New Economy (5) (Rosemary Homeister Jr.)
- 2002 – Wander Mom (4) (Eibar Coa)
- 2001 – Batique (6) (Jorge Chavez)
- 2000 – Wild Heart Dancing
- 1999 - Crystal Symphony
- 1998 – Colcon (Jerry Bailey)
- 1997 – Overcharger (5) (Jose Rivera)
- 1996 – Romy (5) (Francisco Torres)
- 1995 – Danish
- 1994 – Caress
- 1993 – Chickasha (4)
- 1992 – Lady Shirl (5) (Earlie Fires)
