= Empire Glory =

American-bred Thoroughbred racehorse

- Sire: Nijinsky
- Grandsire: Northern Dancer
- Dam: Spearfish
- Damsire: Fleet Nasrullah
- Sex: Stallion
- Foaled: April 8, 1981
- Country: United States
- Colour: Dark Bay or Brown
- Breeder: Glencoe Farm (Mortin Levy & Myron Rosenthal)
- Owner: Robert Sangster; Stavros Niarchos
- Trainer: Vincent O'Brien
- Record: 6: 2–2–2

Major wins
- Royal Whip Stakes (1984)

Awards
- Timeform rating 118

Empire Glory (foaled April 8, 1981) was a Thoroughbred racehorse who was sold for a world record price as a yearling in 1982. He proved to be just short of top class in a brief racing career, winning the Royal Whip Stakes and finishing second in the Irish St Leger. He made little impact as a breeding stallion.

== Background ==
Empire Glory was a bay or brown horse bred in Kentucky by Mortin Levy & Myron Rosenthal's Glencoe Farm. His dam, Spearfish, had won the Hollywood Oaks in 1966 and had produced the leading North American racehorse King's Bishop and the Irish 1000 Guineas winner Gaily. Through Gaily, she was also the ancestor of Pilsudski. Empire Glory was sired by the Triple Crown winner Nijinsky.

In 1982, he was consigned by Glencoe Farm to the Keeneland Sales, where he was sold for a record-setting $4.25 million ($14.2 million inflation-adjusted) to the bloodstock agents BBA (Ireland) on behalf of the British businessman Robert Sangster after a prolonged bidding battle with representatives of Sheikh Mohammed. The colt was sent to Europe and was trained by Vincent O'Brien at Ballydoyle.

== Racing career ==
Empire Glory raced only as a three-year-old in the 1984 season. After refusing to enter the starting stalls on his first racecourse appearance, he finished second in his first completed race and then won a maiden race at Leopardstown by six lengths. He was then stepped up in class for the Grade Three Royal Whip Stakes over one and a half miles at the Curragh Racecourse in July. Ridden by Pat Eddery, he won by three-quarters of a length from Sondrio and Yawa. In his two remaining races, Empire Glory was equipped with blinkers. He finished third to Arctic Lord in the Beresford Stakes and then produced his best effort when finishing second, a neck behind the filly Opale, in the Group One Irish St Leger.

== Stud record ==
Empire Glory stood as a breeding stallion in the USA. He sired several minor winners but nothing of top class. He died in 2001.

== Pedigree ==
Pedigree of Empire Glory (USA), bay or brown stallion, 1981
Sire Nijinsky (CAN) 1967	Northern Dancer (CAN); 1961	Nearctic	Nearco
Sire Nijinsky (CAN) 1967	Northern Dancer (CAN); 1961	Nearctic	Lady Angela
Sire Nijinsky (CAN) 1967	Northern Dancer (CAN); 1961	Natalma	Native Dancer
Sire Nijinsky (CAN) 1967	Northern Dancer (CAN); 1961	Natalma	Almahmoud
Sire Nijinsky (CAN) 1967	Flaming Page (CAN); 1959	Bull Page	Bull Lea
Sire Nijinsky (CAN) 1967	Flaming Page (CAN); 1959	Bull Page	Our Page
Sire Nijinsky (CAN) 1967	Flaming Page (CAN); 1959	Flaring Top	Menow
Sire Nijinsky (CAN) 1967	Flaming Page (CAN); 1959	Flaring Top	Flaming Top
Dam Spearfish (USA) 1963	Fleet Nasrullah (USA); 1955	Nasrullah	Nearco
Dam Spearfish (USA) 1963	Fleet Nasrullah (USA); 1955	Nasrullah	Mumtaz Begum
Dam Spearfish (USA) 1963	Fleet Nasrullah (USA); 1955	Happy Go Fleet	Count Fleet
Dam Spearfish (USA) 1963	Fleet Nasrullah (USA); 1955	Happy Go Fleet	Dreah
Dam Spearfish (USA) 1963	Alabama Gal (USA); 1957	Determine	Alibhai
Dam Spearfish (USA) 1963	Alabama Gal (USA); 1957	Determine	Koubis
Dam Spearfish (USA) 1963	Alabama Gal (USA); 1957	Trojan Lass	Priam
Dam Spearfish (USA) 1963	Alabama Gal (USA); 1957	Trojan Lass	Rompers (Family:11)

- Empire Glory was inbred 4 × 4 to Nearco, meaning that this stallion appears twice in the fourth generation of his pedigree.

Records
Preceded by Ballydoyle	Most expensive Thoroughbred colt yearling July 19, 1982 – July 19, 1983	Next: Snaafi Dancer
