= Dark Lomond =

Irish-bred Thoroughbred racehorse

- Sire: Lomond
- Grandsire: Northern Dancer
- Dam: Arkadina
- Damsire: Ribot
- Sex: Mare
- Foaled: 7 June 1985
- Country: Ireland
- Colour: Bay
- Breeder: Swettenham Stud
- Owner: Stavros Niarchos
- Trainer: Vincent O'Brien
- Record: 8: 3–2–0

Major wins
- Phoenix Oaks Trial (1988); Pretty Polly Stakes (1988); Irish St Leger (1988)

Dark Lomond (7 June 1985 – after 1996) was an Irish thoroughbred racehorse and broodmare. She showed promise when finishing second on her only run as a juvenile in 1987 and developed into a high-class middle-distance performer and stayer in the following year. She won the Phoenix Oaks Trial and the Pretty Polly Stakes in June 1988 and returned in October to record her biggest victory in the Irish St Leger. After her racing career ended she became a broodmare and had some success as a dam of winners.

== Background ==
Dark Lomond was a bay mare bred in Ireland by Robert Sangster's Swettenham Stud. During her racing career she competed in the colours of Stavros Niarchos and was trained by Vincent O'Brien at Ballydoyle.

She was one of the best racehorses sire by Lomond, an American-bred half-brother of Seattle Slew who won the 2000 Guineas in 1983. His other offspring included Marling, Inchmurrin, Valanour and River North. Dark Lomond's dam Arkadina was a top-class performer who won the Athasi Stakes and was placed in the Irish 1000 Guineas, Epsom Oaks and Irish Oaks in 1972. Her other foals included Forlene (Silken Glider Stakes), Encyclopedia (Ulster Derby) and South Atlantic (Blandford Stakes). Arkadina was a daughter of the Alabama Stakes winner Natashka whose other female-line descendants have included Margarula, Elusive Quality and Questing.

== Racing career ==
=== 1987: two-year-old season ===
On her racecourse debut, Dark Lomond contested a maiden race over six furlongs at the Curragh in October and finished strongly to take second place, three quarters of a length behind the John Oxx-trained Catina. At the end of the year the independent Timeform organisation gave her a rating of 88 p (the "p" indicating that she was expected to make more than usual improvement) and commented in their annual Racehorses of 1987 that she was "sure to win races".

=== 1988: three-year-old season ===
Dark Lomond was ridden by John Reid in her first four races as a three-year-old. On her seasonal debut she started the 4/6 favourite for a Listed race over ten furlongs on heavy ground at Phoenix Park Racecourse on 4 May but was beaten into second place by the outsider Viqueen. The ground was much lest testing when she returned to Phoenix Park in June for the Phoenix Oaks Trial over eleven furlongs. She was made the 7/4 favourite and won by four lengths from Host of Angels, with Viqueen trailing in last of the ten runners. Later that month the filly was stepped up in class for the Group 2 Pretty Polly Stakes at the Curragh and started 15/8 favourite ahead of her stablemate Dancing Goddess, who had finished second in the Irish 1000 Guineas on her last start. After being restrained by Reid in the early stages, she moved into contention in the last quarter mile and then produced a strong late run up the inside rail to win by a length and a neck from Skating and Ardglen.

After a break of over two months Dark Lomond returned in the Meld Stakes at the Curragh on 27 August, and finished second, half a length behind the British-trained filly Sailors Mate, to whom she was conceding five pounds in weight. Declan Gillespie took over from Reid when Dark Lomond was the only three-year-old filly in the thirteen-runner field which contested the Irish St Leger over fourteen furlongs at the Curragh on 24 September. The 1987 winner Eurobird started favourite ahead of Zaffaran (March Stakes), Heavenly Manna (Royal Whip Stakes) and Kris Kringle (Derrinstown Stud Derby Trial) with Dark Lomond next in the betting on 10/1. Dark Lomond was towards the rear of the field before moving up into sixth place behind Waterfield on the final turn. Kris Kringle went to the front but Dark Lomond overtook him a furlong and a half from the finish and stayed on well to win by three lengths from Daarkom. Eurobird took third place ahead of Alwasmi with Kris Kringle fading into fifth.

On her penultimate appearance Dark Lomond contested Europe's most prestigious weight-for-age race, the Prix de l'Arc de Triomphe over 2400 metres at Longchamp Racecourse on 2 October. She never looked likely to win but stayed on in the straight to finish eleventh of the 24 runners, seven and a half lengths behind the winner Tony Bin. She returned to Longchamp three weeks later for the Prix Royal Oak over 3100 metres. After racing at the rear of the sixteen-runner field he made some progress in the closing stages and finished sixth behind the four-year-old colt Star Lift.

== Breeding record ==
After her retirement from racing Dark Lomond became a broodmare. She produced at least five foals and three winners between 1990 and 1996:

- St Jones, a bay colt, foaled in 1990, sired by Shirley Heights. Unraced.
- Gothic Dream, bay filly, 1991, by Nashwan. Won one race, placed in the Irish Oaks and the Ribblesdale Stakes: dam of Pugin (Ballycullen Stakes) and grand-dam of Lilbourne Lad (Railway Stakes).
- Machikane Kagaribi, bay filly, 1992, by Kris. Won one race.
- Meribel, bay filly, 1993, by Nashwan. Failed to win in three races.
- Akuna Bay, bay filly, 1996, by Mr Prospector. Won one race, dam of Sugar Ray (Duke of Edinburgh Stakes).

== Pedigree ==
Pedigree of Dark Lomond (IRE), bay mare, 1985
Sire Lomond (USA) 1980	Northern Dancer (CAN); 1961	Nearctic	Nearco
Sire Lomond (USA) 1980	Northern Dancer (CAN); 1961	Nearctic	Lady Angela
Sire Lomond (USA) 1980	Northern Dancer (CAN); 1961	Natalma	Native Dancer
Sire Lomond (USA) 1980	Northern Dancer (CAN); 1961	Natalma	Almahmoud
Sire Lomond (USA) 1980	My Charmer (USA); 1969	Poker	Round Table
Sire Lomond (USA) 1980	My Charmer (USA); 1969	Poker	Glamour
Sire Lomond (USA) 1980	My Charmer (USA); 1969	Fair Charmer	Jet Action
Sire Lomond (USA) 1980	My Charmer (USA); 1969	Fair Charmer	Myrtle Charm
Dam Arkadina (USA) 1969	Ribot (GB); 1952	Tenerani	Bellini
Dam Arkadina (USA) 1969	Ribot (GB); 1952	Tenerani	Tofanella
Dam Arkadina (USA) 1969	Ribot (GB); 1952	Romanella	El Greco
Dam Arkadina (USA) 1969	Ribot (GB); 1952	Romanella	Barbara Burrini
Dam Arkadina (USA) 1969	Natashka (USA); 1963	Dedicate	Princequillo
Dam Arkadina (USA) 1969	Natashka (USA); 1963	Dedicate	Dini
Dam Arkadina (USA) 1969	Natashka (USA); 1963	Natasha	Nasrullah
Dam Arkadina (USA) 1969	Natashka (USA); 1963	Natasha	Vagrancy (family: 13-c)
