= Black Minnaloushe =

American-bred Thoroughbred racehorse

- Sire: Storm Cat
- Grandsire: Storm Bird
- Dam: Coral Dance
- Damsire: Green Dancer
- Sex: Stallion
- Foaled: 5 February 1998
- Country: United States
- Colour: Bay
- Breeder: John R Gaines Thoroughbreds & William Condren
- Owner: Susan Magnier & Michael Tabor
- Trainer: Aidan O'Brien
- Record: 11: 3-4-0
- Earnings: £352,621

Major wins
- Blenheim Stakes (2000); Irish 2000 Guineas (2001); St James's Palace Stakes (2001)

Black Minnaloushe (foaled 5 February 1998) is an American-bred Thoroughbred racehorse and sire. Bred in Kentucky, he was sold as a yearling and sent to Ireland to race for the Irish-based Coolmore Stud organisation. After winning both his races as a juvenile, he was initially disappointing in early 2001 but showed marked improvement to win the Irish 2000 Guineas and the St James's Palace Stakes. He was beaten in his last four races and was retired to stud at the end of the year. He has succeeded as a breeding stallion in the United States, New Zealand and South Africa.

== Background ==
Black Minnaloushe is a bay horse bred in Kentucky by John R Gaines Thoroughbreds & William Condren. He was sired by Storm Cat, a high-class racehorse who won the Young America Stakes and finished second in the Breeders' Cup Juvenile in 1985. He became an exceptionally successful breeding stallion and was the Leading sire in North America in 1999 and 2000. The best of his progeny included Aljabr, Bluegrass Cat, Cat Thief, Forestry, Sophisticat, Giant's Causeway, Hold That Tiger, Jalil, Life Is Sweet, One Cool Cat, Storm Flag Flying and Tabasco Cat. Black Minnaloushe's dam Coral Dance was a successful racemare who finished second in the Prix Marcel Boussac. As a broodmare, her other foals included Pennekamp and Nasr El Arab (Oak Tree Invitational Stakes, Carleton F. Burke Handicap, Strub Stakes, San Juan Capistrano Handicap).

As a foal, Black Minnaloushe was sent to the Keeneland Sales in November 1998 and was bought for $750,000 by the bloodstock agent Dermot "Demi" O'Byrne, acting on behalf of the Coolmore Stud organisation. The colt was sent to Europe, where Aidan O'Brien trained him at Ballydoyle. Like many Coolmore horses, the details of Black Minnaloushe's ownership changed from race to race: he was listed as being owned by Susan Magnier in some races, whilst on other occasions, he was described as the property of a partnership between Magnier and Michael Tabor. He was ridden in six of eleven races by Mick Kinane.

The colt's name derives from W B Yeats' poem "The Cat and the Moon" from The Wild Swans at Coole.

== Racing career ==
=== 2000: two-year-old season ===
Black Minnaloushe began his racing career in a six furlong maiden race at Cork Racecourse on 7 August 2000. Starting the 4/6 favourite against five opponents, he took the lead inside the final furlong and drew away in the closing stages to win by four lengths from the Dermot Weld-trained La Stellina. In September, the colt was moved up in class and became a favourite for the Listed Blenheim Stakes at the Curragh. He tracked the leaders before taking the lead a furlong and a half out and held off the late challenge of the British-trained Imperial Dancer to win by three-quarters of a length.

=== 2001: three-year-old season ===
Black Minnaloushe made his three-year-old debut in the Listed Loughbrown Stakes at the Curragh on 21 April. Before the race, O'Brien said, "He has done exceptionally well and is a big horse this year. He can be a bit headstrong early in his races, but that's because he has a lot of natural speed". He started as an odds-on favourite but was beaten two lengths into second place by Lethal Agenda. Colm O'Donoghue took over from Kinane when the colt contested the Tetrarch Stakes at the same track two weeks later. Black Minnaloushe started poorly and finished last of the five runners behind his stablemate Modigliani, with another O'Brien trainee, Mozart, in third. Six days later, accompanied by Modigliani and King's County, the colt was part of O'Brien's entry for the Poule d'Essai des Poulains at Longchamp Racecourse in Paris. Ridden by Jamie Spencer, he raced at the rear of the eleven-runner field before making progress in the straight and finished sixth, five lengths behind Noverre. The winner was subsequently disqualified after failing a dope test, and the race was awarded to Vahorimix. On 26 May, Black Minnaloushe, ridden by Johnny Murtagh, was one of four O'Brien colts to contest the Irish 2000 Guineas at the Curragh and started a 20/1 outsider in a twelve-runner field. The Middle Park Stakes winner Minardi (ridden by Kinane) started favourite ahead of the 2000 Guineas runner-up Tamburlaine and the British-trained Mugharreb, whilst the other contenders included Mozart and the highly rated maiden winner Freud. Black Minnaloushe raced in mid-division as Mozart led from the start, opened up a clear advantage, and moved up into third place approaching the final furlong. He caught Mozart well inside the final furlong and went on to win by two lengths, with Minardi taking third to complete a 1-2-3 for Ballydoyle. After the race, Murtagh commented, "There was a bit of a mix-up during the week about what I was going to ride, and thankfully, Aidan put me on Black Minnaloushe. It just goes to show that you need a little bit of luck in this game. [Aidan O'Brien] says he's a horse with lots of ability and sometimes doesn't always put his best foot forward. Today, the race was run to suit him; there was a good strong pace all the way, and when the leader started to tire in front of him, he got a great heart in picking him up."

Murtagh retained the ride when Black Minnaloushe was sent to England for the 156th running of the St James's Palace Stakes at Royal Ascot and started at odds of 8/1 in an eleven-runner field. Noverre started favourite ahead of Minardi, Dandoun (Heron Stakes) and Vahorimix, whilst the other runners were Olden Times (Prix Jean Prat), Tamburlaine, No Excuse Needed (Vintage Stakes), Keltos, the unbeaten Malhub and the Ballydoyle pacemaker Darwin. Murtagh tracked at the start to settle Black Minnaloushe at the back of the field on the inside rail as Darwin set a strong pace. The colt moved into contention early in the straight before being switched to the left to make his challenge inside the final furlong. In a closely contested finish, he overtook Noverre in the final strides and won by a neck, with Olden Times a head away in third and Vahorimix a further half-length back in fourth. After the race, Murtagh commented, "When I switched him out, I knew he was going to win... this was a top-class race and a top-class horse." He was also reported as saying "I picked him up in the Irish Guineas, but everyone said that was a fluke. He's a very good horse, improving all the time."

Eighteen days after his win at Ascot, Black Minnaloushe was matched against older horses for the first time and stepped up in the distance for the Eclipse Stakes over ten furlongs at Sandown. Ridden by Kinane, the colt started the 5/2 second favourite, but after being restrained at the rear of the field, he never looked likely to win and finished fifth of the eight runners behind Medicean, Grandera, Bach and Tobougg. On 1 August, Black Minnaloushe was dropped back in distance and started 3/1 favourite for the Group One Sussex Stakes at Goodwood. After being held up in the early stages, he moved up to dispute the lead in the straight before finishing third behind Noverre, and no excuse was needed. Three weeks later, Black Minnaloushe contested the International Stakes over ten furlongs at York Racecourse and finished fourth behind Sakhee, Grandera and Medicean.

On his final appearance, Black Minnaloushe was sent to the United States for the Breeders' Cup Classic over ten furlongs on dirt at Belmont Park on 27 October. Murtagh rode him, with Kinane being assigned the ride on the O'Brien stable's main hope, Galileo. Starting a 51/1 outsider, he was always towards the rear of the field and finished tenth of the thirteen runners behind Tiznow.

== Stud record ==
Black Minnaloushe retired from racing to become a breeding stallion for the Coolmore Stud and stood at the Ashford Stud in Kentucky. He was shuttled to stand at the Windsor Park Stud in New Zealand for the Southern Hemisphere breeding season and immediately impacted Australasia. In June 2006, a majority interest in the stallion was sold to the Maine Chance Farm and exported to South Africa at the end of the year.

His major winners have included Dancing in Silks (Breeder's Cup Sprint), Jokers Wild (Manawatu Sires Produce Stakes), Stream Cat (Arlington Handicap) and Black Mamba (John C. Mabee Handicap).

== Pedigree ==
Pedigree of Black Minnaloushe (USA), bay stallion, 1998
Sire Storm Cat (USA) 1983	Storm Bird (CAN); 1978	Northern Dancer	Nearctic
Sire Storm Cat (USA) 1983	Storm Bird (CAN); 1978	Northern Dancer	Natalma
Sire Storm Cat (USA) 1983	Storm Bird (CAN); 1978	South Ocean	New Providence
Sire Storm Cat (USA) 1983	Storm Bird (CAN); 1978	South Ocean	Shining Sun
Sire Storm Cat (USA) 1983	Terlingua (USA); 1976	Secretariat	Bold Ruler
Sire Storm Cat (USA) 1983	Terlingua (USA); 1976	Secretariat	Somethingroyal
Sire Storm Cat (USA) 1983	Terlingua (USA); 1976	Crimson Saint	Crimson Satan
Sire Storm Cat (USA) 1983	Terlingua (USA); 1976	Crimson Saint	Bolero Rose
Dam Coral Dance (FR) 1978	Green Dancer (USA); 1972	Nijinsky	Northern Dancer
Dam Coral Dance (FR) 1978	Green Dancer (USA); 1972	Nijinsky	Flaming Page
Dam Coral Dance (FR) 1978	Green Dancer (USA); 1972	Green Valley	Val de Loir
Dam Coral Dance (FR) 1978	Green Dancer (USA); 1972	Green Valley	Sly Pola
Dam Coral Dance (FR) 1978	Carvinia (FR); 1970	Diatome	Sicambre
Dam Coral Dance (FR) 1978	Carvinia (FR); 1970	Diatome	Dictaway
Dam Coral Dance (FR) 1978	Carvinia (FR); 1970	Coraline	Dancer's Image
Dam Coral Dance (FR) 1978	Carvinia (FR); 1970	Coraline	Copelina (Family 20-d)
