= Lichine (horse) =

American-bred Thoroughbred racehorse

- Sire: Lyphard
- Grandsire: Northern Dancer
- Dam: Stylish Genie
- Damsire: Bagdad
- Sex: Stallion
- Foaled: 5 May 1979
- Country: United States
- Colour: Bay
- Breeder: Mrs. J. Getty & Carelaine Stables
- Owner: Stavros Niarchos
- Trainer: François Boutin
- Record: 15: 3–1–4

Major wins
- Prix de Suresnes (1982)

Awards
- Timeform rating 117 (1982), 113 (1983)

Lichine (foaled 5 May 1979) was an American-bred, French-trained Thoroughbred racehorse who sold for a record-setting $1.7 million ($6.6 million inflation adjusted) as a yearling in 1980. Although he never threatened to repay his auction price, he was a useful racehorse, winning the Listed Prix de Suresnes as a three-year-old and finishing placed in several Group races.

== Background ==
Lichine was a "smallish, wiry" bay horse bred in Maryland by Mrs. J. Getty & Carelaine Stables. He was from the sixth crop of foals sired by Lyphard, an American-bred stallion who raced in France, winning the Prix Jacques Le Marois and Prix de la Forêt in 1972. Lyphard went on to become a very successful breeding stallion in both Europe and North America, siring Three Troikas, Dancing Brave and Manila. His dam, Stylish Genie was a minor stakes winner and a half-sister to Artaius, a Kentucky-bred colt who won the Eclipse Stakes and the Sussex Stakes in 1977.

In 1981, the yearling was consigned to the Keeneland Sales where he was bought for a then world-record price of $1.7 million by the bloodstock agents BBA England, representing the Greek shipping magnate Stavros Niarchos. The colt was sent to France where he was trained by François Boutin.

== Racing career ==
Unraced as a two-year-old, Lichine began his racing career in the spring of 1982 by winning a maiden race at Évry and the Listed Prix de Suresnes over 2200 metres at Longchamp Racecourse in May. He was beaten in his five remaining races that year but ran well to finish third in the Prix Daphnis, fifth in the Prix du Moulin and fourth in the Prix du Rond Point.

Lichine stayed in training as a four-year-old and ran eight times, recording his only success in a race over 1850 metres at Longchamp in May. He again ran well in defeat on several occasions: he finished third in the Prix de Ris-Orangis, third in the Prix du Muguet, fourth in the Prix du Chemin de Fer du Nord and fourth in the Prix de la Forêt.

== Stud record ==
Lichine was retired from racing to stand at the Haras de Fresnay-le-Buffard in Normandy at an initial fee of Fr25,000. He later stood as a breeding stallion in Spain.

== Pedigree ==
Pedigree of Lichine (USA), bay horse, 1979
Sire Lyphard (USA) 1969	Northern Dancer (CAN); 1961	Nearctic	Nearco
Sire Lyphard (USA) 1969	Northern Dancer (CAN); 1961	Nearctic	Lady Angela
Sire Lyphard (USA) 1969	Northern Dancer (CAN); 1961	Natalma	Native Dancer
Sire Lyphard (USA) 1969	Northern Dancer (CAN); 1961	Natalma	Almahmoud
Sire Lyphard (USA) 1969	Goofed (USA); 1960	Court Martial	Fair Trial
Sire Lyphard (USA) 1969	Goofed (USA); 1960	Court Martial	Instantaneous
Sire Lyphard (USA) 1969	Goofed (USA); 1960	Barra	Formor
Sire Lyphard (USA) 1969	Goofed (USA); 1960	Barra	La Favorite
Dam Stylish Genie (USA) 1971	Bagdad (USA); 1956	Double Jay	Balladier
Dam Stylish Genie (USA) 1971	Bagdad (USA); 1956	Double Jay	Broom Shot
Dam Stylish Genie (USA) 1971	Bagdad (USA); 1956	Bazura	Blue Peter
Dam Stylish Genie (USA) 1971	Bagdad (USA); 1956	Bazura	Bura
Dam Stylish Genie (USA) 1971	Stylish Pattern (USA); 1961	My Babu	Djebel
Dam Stylish Genie (USA) 1971	Stylish Pattern (USA); 1961	My Babu	Perfume
Dam Stylish Genie (USA) 1971	Stylish Pattern (USA); 1961	Sunset Gun	Hyperion
Dam Stylish Genie (USA) 1971	Stylish Pattern (USA); 1961	Sunset Gun	Ace of Spades (Family 14-c)

Records
Preceded by Hoist The King	Most expensive Thoroughbred colt yearling July 22, 1980 – 1981	Next: Ballydoyle
