= Thoroughbred valuation =

Determining the value of a horse

Thoroughbred valuation is the art of determining the value or potential value of a Thoroughbred horse, particularly of race horses.

Prices on Thoroughbreds vary greatly, depending on age, pedigree, conformation, and other market factors. In 2007, Keeneland Sales, a United States–based sales company, sold 9,124 horses at auction, with a total value of $814,401,000, which gives an average price of $89,259. As a whole for the United States in 2007, The Jockey Club auction statistics indicate that the average weanling sold for $44,407, the average yearling sold for $55,300, average sale price for two-year-olds was $61,843, broodmares averaged $70,150, and horses over two and broodmare prospects sold for an average of $53,243. For Europe, the July 2007 Tattersall's Sale sold 593 horses at auction, with a total for the sale of 10,951,300 guineas, for an average of 18,468 guineas. Doncaster Bloodstock Sales, another British sales firm, in 2007 sold 2,248 horses for a total value of 43,033,881 guineas, making an average of 15,110 guineas per horse.

Averages, however, can be deceiving. For example, at the 2007 Fall Yearling sale at Keeneland, 3,799 young horses sold for a total of $385,018,600, for an average of $101,347 per horse. However, that average sales price reflected a variation that included at least 19 horses that sold for only $1,000 each and 34 that sold for over $1,000,000 apiece.

The value of a Thoroughbred may be influenced by the purse money it wins. In 2007, Thoroughbred racehorses earned a total of $1,217,854,602 in all placings, an average earnings per starter of $16,924. In addition, the track record of a race horse may influence its future value as a breeding animal. Stud fees for stallions that enter breeding can range from $2,500 to $300,000 per mare in the United States, and from £2000 pounds to £75,000 or more in Britain.

Between 1974 and 1988, yearlings sired by Northern Dancer led the Keeneland July Selected Yearling Sale by average price 12 times. In the 1983 Keeneland Sales horse auction, one of Northern Dancer's colts, eventually named Snaafi Dancer, became the first yearling to sell for $10 million at auction. In 1984 12 yearlings by Northern Dancer sold for a sale-record average price of $3,446.666. In the 1980s, Northern Dancer's stud fee reached $1 million, an amount four to five times other stallions and a record that still stands in 2009.

The highest price paid at auction for a Thoroughbred was set in 2006 at $16,000,000 for a two-year-old colt named The Green Monkey, who was a descendant of Northern Dancer. Record prices at auction often grab headlines, though they do not necessarily reflect the animal's future success; in the case of The Green Monkey, injuries limited him to only three career starts before being retired to stud in 2008, and he never won a race.

== Most expensive Thoroughbred yearlings in history sold at auction ==
For a number of years, in the 1970s and 1980s, horses sired by Northern Dancer (1961–1990) held the top ten price records, with 174 Northern Dancer offspring selling for a total $160 million at the Keeneland Sales over 22 years. The National Thoroughbred Racing Association calls him "one of the most influential sires in Thoroughbred history." At the time of his 1990 death, his descendants had won more than 1,000 stakes races. As of 2020, twenty-seven of the thirty-three horses on this list were from the Northern Dancer sire line.

The most recent common ancestor in the sire line of all thirty-three horses on this list is Phalaris, all via Pharos except two—Meydan City and King's Consul—via Sickle.

Thoroughbreds yearlings which sold for more than $7.5 million (inflation adjusted), according to The Blood-Horse
Horse	Foaled	Sire	Dam	Breeder	Year sold	Nominal price	Real price (in 2025 US$)	Buyer
Seattle Dancer	1984	Nijinsky	My Charmer	W. L. Jones, W. S. Farish III, W. S. Kilroy	1985	$13.1 million	$39.2 million	Niarchos, J. Magnier, Sangster, O'Brien, Schwartz
Meydan City	2005	Kingmambo	Crown of Crimson	Jayeff B Stable	2006	$11.7 million	$18.7 million	Sheikh Mohammed
Snaafi Dancer	1982	Northern Dancer	My Bupers	Donald T. Johnson	1983	$10.2 million	$33 million	Aston Upthorpe Stud
Jalil	2004	Storm Cat	Tranquility Lake	Pamela & Martin Wygod	2005	$9.7 million	$16 million	Godolphin Racing
Plavius	2005	Danzig	Sharp Minister	Monticule Farms	2006	$9.2 million	$14.7 million	Godolphin Racing
Al Naamah	2012	Galileo	Alluring Park	Lodge Park Stud	2013	$8.4 million	$11.7 million	Al Shaqab
Imperial Falcon	1983	Northern Dancer	Ballade	E. P. Taylor	1984	$8.25 million	$25.6 million	Robert Sangster
Act of Diplomacy	2005	Storm Cat	Awesome Humor	Taylor Made Farm	2006	$8.2 million	$13.1 million	John Ferguson
Mr. Sekiguchi	2003	Storm Cat	Welcome Surprise	William S. Farish III, William S. Kilroy	2004	$8 million	$13.6 million	Fusao Sekiguchi
Take Control	2007	A.P. Indy	Azeri	Allen E. Paulson Living Trust	2008	$7.7 million	$11.5 million	(reserve not attained, buy back)
Ajdal	1984	Northern Dancer	Native Partner	Ralph C. Wilson, Jr.	1985	$7.5 million	$22.5 million	(reserve not attained, buy back)
Jareer	1983	Northern Dancer	Fabuleux Jane	Ralph C. Wilson, Jr.	1984	$7.1 million	$22 million	Sheikh Mohammed
Laa Etaab	1984	Nijinsky	Crimson Saint	Tom Gentry	1985	$7 million	$21 million	Gainsborough Stud
Tasmanian Tiger	1999	Storm Cat	Hum Along	Lane's End Farm	2000	$6.8 million	$12.7 million	Demi O'Byrne
Amjaad	1983	Seattle Slew	Desiree	Spendthrift Farm	1984	$6.5 million	$20.1 million	Sheikh Mohammed
Van Nistelrooy	2000	Storm Cat	Halory	Stonerside Stable	2001	$6.4 million	$11.6 million	Demi O'Byrne
Objectivity	2004	Storm Cat	Secret Status	Lane's End Farm	2005	$6.3 million	$10.4 million	John Ferguson
Alajwad	2000	Storm Cat	La Affirmed	Eaton Sales	2001	$5.5 million	$10 million	John Ferguson
Obligato	1983	Northern Dancer	Truly Bound	Windfields Farm	1984	$5.4 million	$16.7 million	BBA (Ireland)
Abshurr	1997	Nureyev	Go Solo	Camas Park Stud	1998	$5.4 million	$10.7 million	Godolphin Racing
Nysaean	1999	Sadler's Wells	Irish Arms	Haras d'Etreham	2000	$5.4 million	$10.2 million	Peter Doyle
King's Consul	1999	Kingmambo	Battle Creek Girl	Lane's End Farm	2000	$5.3 million	$9.9 million	John Ferguson
Diaghilev	1999	Sadler's Wells	Darara	Watership Down Stud	2000	$5.2 million	$9.8 million	Demi O'Byrne
Wassl Touch	1983	Northern Dancer	Queen Sucree	North Ridge Farm	1984	$5.1 million	$15.8 million	Sheikh Mohammed
Elnawaagi	1983	Roberto	Gurkhas Band	Keswick Stables	1984	$4.0 million	$12.4 million	Sheikh Mohammed
Warrshan	1986	Northern Dancer	Secret Asset	Hermitage Farm	1987	$3.7 million	$10.5 million	Sheikh Mohammed
Northern State	1985	Northern Dancer	South Ocean	Windfields Farm	1986	$3.6 million	$10.6 million	Sheikh Mohammed
Ballydoyle	1980	Northern Dancer	South Ocean	E. P. Taylor	1981	$3.5 million	$12.4 million	Robert Sangster
Royal Academy	1987	Nijinsky	Crimson Saint	Tom Gentry	1988	$3.5 million	$9.5 million	Vincent O'Brien
Shareef Dancer	1980	Northern Dancer	Sweet Alliance	E. P. Taylor	1981	$3.3 million	$11.7 million	Sheikh Mohammed
Dancing Groom	1985	Nijinsky	Blush With Pride	Darrell Brown	1986	$3.2 million	$9.4 million	BBA (Ireland)
Immortal Dancer	1982	Spectacular Bid	Farouche	Newstead Farm Trust	1983	$3.0 million	$9.7 million	Aston Upthorpe Stud
Fulmar	1980	Northern Dancer	Bernie Bird	E. P. Taylor	1981	$2.95 million	$10.4 million	BBA (England)

Thoroughbreds yearling fillies which sold for more than $7.5 million (inflation adjusted), according to The Blood-Horse
Horse	Foaled	Sire	Dam	Breeder	Year sold	Nominal price	Real price (in 2025 US$)	Buyer
Altruiste	1999	Diesis	Allegretta	Haras d'Etreham	2000	$8.2 million	$15.3 million	Suprina
America's Joy	2018	American Pharoah	Leslie's Lady	Clarkland Farm	2019	$8.2 million	$10.3 million	Whisper Hill Farm
Alchaasibiyeh	1983	Seattle Slew	Fine Prospect	Spendthrift Farm	1984	$3.75 million	$11.6 million	Sheikh Mohammed
