= The Green Monkey =

American-bred Thoroughbred racehorse

- Sire: Forestry
- Grandsire: Storm Cat
- Dam: Magical Masquerade
- Damsire: Unbridled
- Sex: Stallion
- Foaled: 2004
- Country: United States
- Colour: Bay
- Breeder: Padua Stables
- Owner: Sue Magnier, Derrick Smith & Michael Tabor
- Trainer: Todd A. Pletcher
- Record: 3: 0–0–1
- Earnings: $10,440

The Green Monkey (February 4, 2004 – May 2018) was an American Thoroughbred racehorse. A descendant of both Northern Dancer and Secretariat, The Green Monkey was sold in 2006 as a two-year-old colt for the highest price ever paid at auction for a Thoroughbred—$16,000,000.

== Background ==
The Green Monkey, a bay colt with a white blaze and two white socks, was foaled on February 4, 2004. He was sired by Gr.I winner Forestry, and was out of the Unbridled mare Magical Masquerade.

At the January 2006 Fasig-Tipton Calder sale of selected two-year-olds, The Green Monkey was sold for a world-record auction price of $16 million (equal to about $25 million today). He joins nine other descendants of Northern Dancer who clinch the entire list of the ten most expensive colts sold at auction (current to 2014).

The colt's new owners gave him the name because of their connections with The Green Monkey golf course in Barbados, named after the island's green monkeys. The colt was also foaled in the Chinese year of the green/wooden monkey.

== Racing career ==
On September 15, 2007, The Green Monkey made his racing debut in a six-furlong maiden race at Belmont Park in Elmont, New York. Made the 2–5 betting favorite, the colt finished third behind winner Roi Maudit and runner-up Sixthirteen.

The Green Monkey made the second start of his career at Belmont Park on October 13 in a seven-furlong race for nonwinners. In a field of seven, he finished a well-beaten fourth to winner Giant Deputy in a time of 1:21.20.

The Green Monkey was officially retired February 12, 2008 after failing to break his maiden in his three career starts.

== Stud record and death ==
A portion of his ownership was acquired by the same pinhook sellers, Randy Hartley and Dean De Renzo, who originally acquired and sold him at auction in the 2006 Fasig-Tipton Calder sale. Hartley and De Renzo bought back into the horse with partner John Magnier (Coolmore Stud). He entered stud at their Hartley/De Renzo Thoroughbreds in Ocala beginning in 2009. His initial stud fee was set at $5,000.

The first reported foal by The Green Monkey was a filly born January 13, 2010. The newborn, bred by Jacqueline Fleck, is the third foal out of multiple winner I’m Angela (by Kayrawan). The filly, later named Your Lovely, was a winner.

The Green Monkey was not a success as a stallion. His best progeny include 2015 Panama Triple Crown winner Monkey Business, and North American blacktype winners Kinz Funky Munky and Green Doctor.

The Green Monkey was euthanized in May 2018 at Hartley/DeRenzo Thoroughbreds due to laminitis. “He was doing excellent (sic), and then probably a year and a half ago, he foundered,” said farm co-owner Randy Hartley. “We just struggled with him ever since, trying to do everything we could to get him right. It just got to the point where it wasn't the right thing to do.”

“Nobody will have his stall or anything, it's a special place,” said Hartley. “There will never be another horse like him for us. I thank the Lord for him.”

The Green Monkey was laid to rest on the farm.

== Pedigree ==
Pedigree of The Green Monkey, bay colt, foaled 2004
Sire Forestry (USA) 1996	Storm Cat (USA); 1987	Storm Bird	Northern Dancer
Sire Forestry (USA) 1996	Storm Cat (USA); 1987	Storm Bird	South Ocean
Sire Forestry (USA) 1996	Storm Cat (USA); 1987	Terlingua	Secretariat
Sire Forestry (USA) 1996	Storm Cat (USA); 1987	Terlingua	Crimson Saint
Sire Forestry (USA) 1996	Shared Interest (USA); 1988	Pleasant Colony	His Majesty
Sire Forestry (USA) 1996	Shared Interest (USA); 1988	Pleasant Colony	Sun Colony
Sire Forestry (USA) 1996	Shared Interest (USA); 1988	Surgery	Dr. Fager
Sire Forestry (USA) 1996	Shared Interest (USA); 1988	Surgery	Bold Sequence
Dam Magical Masquerade (USA) 1998	Unbridled (USA); 1983	Fappiano	Mr. Prospector
Dam Magical Masquerade (USA) 1998	Unbridled (USA); 1983	Fappiano	Killaloe
Dam Magical Masquerade (USA) 1998	Unbridled (USA); 1983	Gana Facil	Le Fabuleux
Dam Magical Masquerade (USA) 1998	Unbridled (USA); 1983	Gana Facil	Charedi
Dam Magical Masquerade (USA) 1998	Nannerl (USA); 1987	Valid Appeal	In Reality
Dam Magical Masquerade (USA) 1998	Nannerl (USA); 1987	Valid Appeal	Desert Trial
Dam Magical Masquerade (USA) 1998	Nannerl (USA); 1987	Allouette	Proud Birdie
Dam Magical Masquerade (USA) 1998	Nannerl (USA); 1987	Allouette	Madame Defage
