= Freedom's Flight =

American-bred Thoroughbred racehorse

- Sire: Pulpit
- Grandsire: A.P. Indy
- Dam: Heathers Flight
- Damsire: Seattle Dancer
- Sex: Stallion
- Foaled: February 16, 2005
- Country: United States
- Color: Chestnut
- Breeder: Herman Heinlein
- Owner: Herman Heinlein
- Record: 4: ?–?–?

Freedom's Flight is an American stallion with bloodlines tracing back to Seattle Slew and Secretariat. Freedom broke his leg at the beginning of his fourth start, when leaving the gate at Gulfstream Park. He was then sold to an illegal slaughterhouse for the sum of $50. Rescued by Richard "Kudo" Couto of the South Florida Society for the Prevention of Cruelty to Animals (SPCA), Freedom was nursed back to health. An effort was led by the South Florida SPCA to have Freedom cast in the 2010 movie Secretariat.
