= Shareef Dancer =

American-bred Thoroughbred racehorse

- Sire: Northern Dancer
- Grandsire: Nearctic
- Dam: Sweet Alliance
- Damsire: Sir Ivor
- Sex: Stallion
- Foaled: 1980
- Country: United States
- Color: Bay
- Owner: Maktoum bin Rashid Al Maktoum
- Trainer: Michael Stoute
- Record: 5: 3–1–0
- Earnings: $246,463

Major wins
- Irish Derby Stakes (1983); King Edward VII Stakes (1983)

Awards
- U.K. Champion Middle Distance Horse (1983); Timeform rating: 135
- Last updated on December 9, 2006

Shareef Dancer (1980–1999) was an American-bred, British-trained Thoroughbred racehorse.

== Background ==
Shareef Dancer was sired by Northern Dancer out of the mare Sweet Alliance by Sir Ivor. He was bought by Maktoum bin Rashid Al Maktoum for $3.3 million at Keeneland Sales in 1981, the second-highest selling yearling that year, behind only Ballydoyle. Shareef Dancer was trained by Michael Stoute at Newmarket, Suffolk.

== Racing career ==
The colt started five times, finishing his racing career 3-1-0 with earnings of £144,331. He won the Group I Irish Derby Stakes at the Curragh and the Group II King Edward VII Stakes.

== Stud record ==
In 1983 Shareef Dancer sold for US$40m (£24m), a record price for a stallion prospect. His offspring included Possessive Dancer, Rock Hopper (Hardwicke Stakes), Glory of Dancer (Dante Stakes) Spartan Shareef (September Stakes) Mudahim (Cleeve Hurdle, Racing Post Chase) and Shaima (Long Island Handicap). He was also the damsire of Dubai Millennium. His final stud fee in 1999 was £3,500.

== Pedigree ==
Pedigree of Shareef Dancer, Dark Bay/Brown stallion colt, 1980
Sire Northern Dancer	Nearctic	Nearco	Pharos
Sire Northern Dancer	Nearctic	Nearco	Nogara
Sire Northern Dancer	Nearctic	Lady Angela	Hyperion
Sire Northern Dancer	Nearctic	Lady Angela	Sister Sarah
Sire Northern Dancer	Natalma	Native Dancer	Polynesian
Sire Northern Dancer	Natalma	Native Dancer	Geisha
Sire Northern Dancer	Natalma	Almahmoud	Mahmoud
Sire Northern Dancer	Natalma	Almahmoud	Arbitrator
Dam Sweet Alliance	Sir Ivor	Sir Gaylord	Turn-To
Dam Sweet Alliance	Sir Ivor	Sir Gaylord	Somethingroyal
Dam Sweet Alliance	Sir Ivor	Attica	Mr. Trouble
Dam Sweet Alliance	Sir Ivor	Attica	Athenia
Dam Sweet Alliance	Mrs. Peterkin	Tom Fool	Menow
Dam Sweet Alliance	Mrs. Peterkin	Tom Fool	Gaga
Dam Sweet Alliance	Mrs. Peterkin	Legendra	Challenger
Dam Sweet Alliance	Mrs. Peterkin	Legendra	Lady Legend (family: 4-r)
