= Lyphard =

American-bred, French-trained Thoroughbred racehorse (1969–2005)

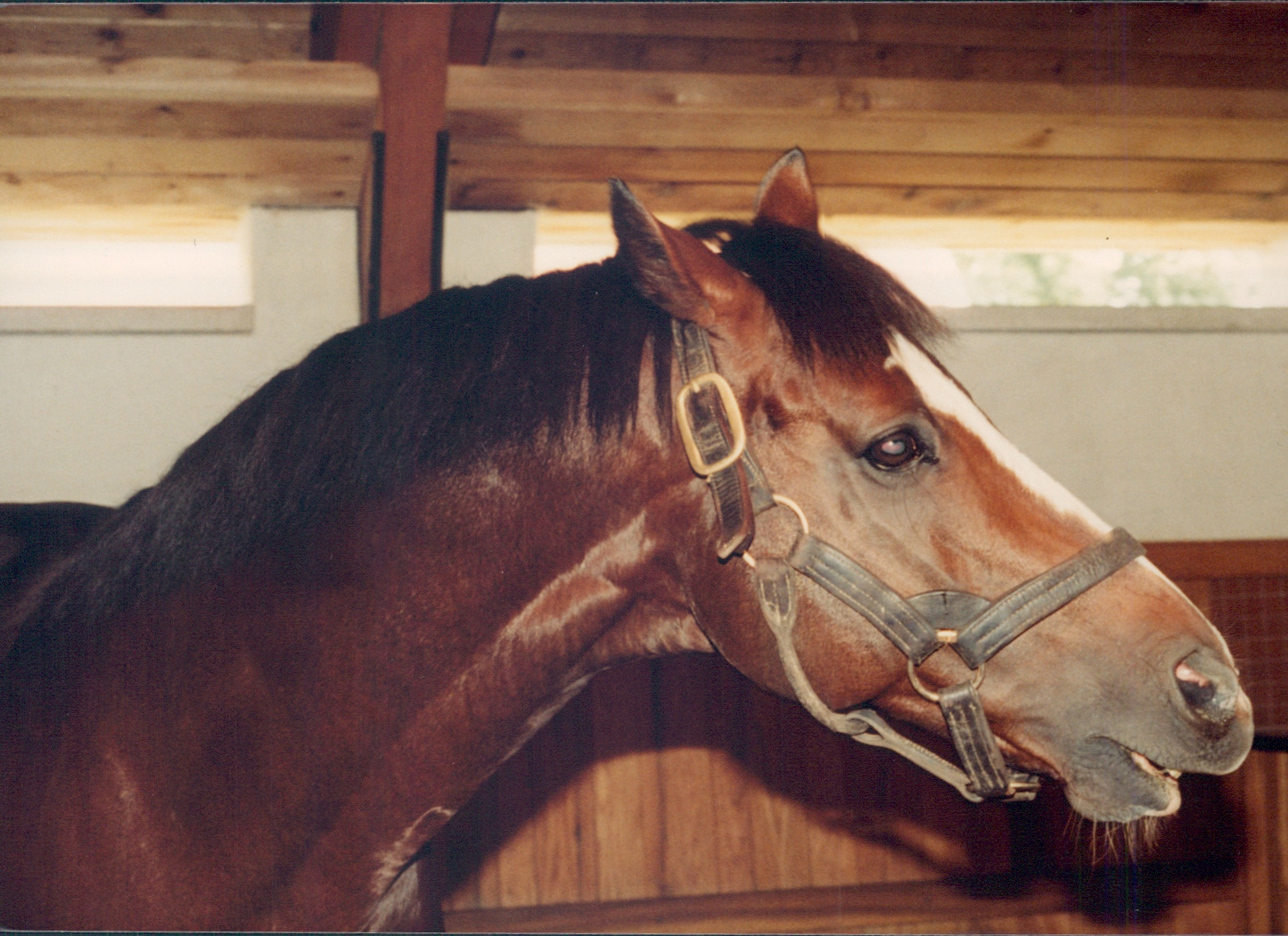
- Lyphard at Gainesway Farm in 1981
- Sire: Northern Dancer
- Grandsire: Nearctic
- Dam: Goofed
- Damsire: Court Martial
- Sex: Stallion
- Foaled: 10 May 1969
- Country: United States
- Colour: Bay
- Breeder: J. O. Burgwin
- Owner: Germaine Wertheimer
- Trainer: Alec Head
- Record: 12: 6–1–0
- Earnings: $202,332

Major wins
- Prix Herod (1971); Prix Daru (1972); Prix Jacques Le Marois (1972); Prix Lagrange (1972); Prix de la Forêt (1972)

Awards
- Champion 1st-season Sire in France & England (1976); Leading sire in France (1978 & 1979); Leading broodmare sire in France (1985); Leading sire in North America (1986); Timeform rating: 132
- Last updated on 28 September 2023

Lyphard (10 May 1969 – 10 June 2005) was an American-bred, French-trained Thoroughbred racehorse and an important sire.

== Background ==
American bred in Pennsylvania, Lyphard was a son of Northern Dancer out of the mare Goofed. He was auctioned as a weanling at November's Keeneland Sales to Tim Rogers, a horseman from Ireland, who then put him up for sale at Newmarket in England. There, renowned French trainer and breeder Alec Head purchased him on behalf of Madame Germaine Wertheimer, widow of the prominent French horseman and owner of the famous House of Chanel, Pierre Wertheimer. Germaine Wertheimer gave Lyphard his name in honor of the Ukrainian-born French ballet dancer and choreographer Serge Lifar.

== Racing career ==
On the track, Lyphard competed in France, Ireland and England, winning six of his twelve starts, including the Group One Prix Jacques Le Marois and Prix de la Forêt.

== Stud record ==
Retired after the end of the 1972 racing season, Lyphard was sent to stand at stud at the Haras d'Etreham near Bayeux in Normandy. There, his offspring included the filly Durtal (foaled 1974), who won the Cheveley Park Stakes, plus the colt Pharly (1974), who won several important races in France, including the Group One Prix de la Forêt, Prix Lupin and Prix du Moulin de Longchamp.

Madame Wertheimer died in 1974. In 1978, Lyphard was sent to stand at Gainesway Farm in Lexington, Kentucky, where he became famous as the sire of a number of important horses. In all, he produced 115 graded stakes race winners, including:

- Dancing Maid (foaled 1975), won Poule d'Essai des Pouliches, Prix Vermeille
- Three Troikas (1976) – won the 1979 Prix de l'Arc de Triomphe
- Lichine (1979) – sold for record-setting $1.7 million at Keeneland Sales in July 1980
- Dancing Brave (1983) – won the 1986 2000 Guineas, King George VI and Queen Elizabeth Stakes, Coral Eclipse Stakes and Prix de l'Arc de Triomphe.
- Top-rated European horse (International Classification) (1986) Top-rated European horse (Timeform) (1986) Dancing Brave was syndicated with an estimated value of £14m.
- Manila (1983) – won the 1986 Breeders' Cup Turf, was voted U.S. Champion Male Turf Horse, and was ranked the best long-distance turf horse in American racing history by Steve Davidowitz of Daily Racing Form
- Rainbows For Life (1988) – Multiple stakes winner, three-time Sovereign Award winner, holds course record for 1 1/8 miles (1.8 km) on turf at Hawthorne Race Course set in 1991, champion sire in Czech Republic in 1999, 2004, 2005 and 2006, champion sire in Slovak Republic in 1999
- Jolypha (1989) – Champion 3-Year-Old Filly in France, who won the 1992 Prix de Diane and Prix Vermeille and was a strong third in that year's Breeders' Cup Classic behind Eclipse Award Champion Pleasant Tap and the race winner, the future U.S. Hall of Fame colt A.P. Indy

Lyphard was the damsire of Hatoof, winner of the 1992 1,000 Guineas and the 1994 U.S. Champion Female Turf Horse. Lyphard was also the grandsire of 1993 Epsom Derby winner Commander in Chief. Among his other descendants are Deep Impact, Japan's Horse of the Year in 2005 & 2006, and the No.1 ranked horse in the world in 2006, Invasor.

At maturity, he reached 15.2 hands (62 inches, 157 cm) high.

== Retirement and death ==
In 1996, Lyphard was pensioned from stallion duty at age 27 and lived another nine years. He was one of the oldest Thoroughbred horses in the world by the time he was humanely euthanised on 10 June 2005 at the age of 36, as a result of the infirmities of very old age.

== Pedigree ==
Pedigree of Lyphard
Sire Northern Dancer b. 1961	Nearctic b. 1954	Nearco b. 1935	Pharos
Sire Northern Dancer b. 1961	Nearctic b. 1954	Nearco b. 1935	Nogara
Sire Northern Dancer b. 1961	Nearctic b. 1954	Lady Angela b. 1944	Hyperion
Sire Northern Dancer b. 1961	Nearctic b. 1954	Lady Angela b. 1944	Sister Sarah
Sire Northern Dancer b. 1961	Natalma b. 1957	Native Dancer b. 1950	Polynesian
Sire Northern Dancer b. 1961	Natalma b. 1957	Native Dancer b. 1950	Geisha
Sire Northern Dancer b. 1961	Natalma b. 1957	Almahmoud b. 1947	Mahmoud
Sire Northern Dancer b. 1961	Natalma b. 1957	Almahmoud b. 1947	Arbitrator
Dam Goofed b. 1960	Court Martial b. 1942	Fair Trial b. 1932	Fairway
Dam Goofed b. 1960	Court Martial b. 1942	Fair Trial b. 1932	Lady Juror
Dam Goofed b. 1960	Court Martial b. 1942	Instantaneous b. 1931	Hurry On
Dam Goofed b. 1960	Court Martial b. 1942	Instantaneous b. 1931	Picture
Dam Goofed b. 1960	Barra b. 1950	Formor b. 1934	Ksar
Dam Goofed b. 1960	Barra b. 1950	Formor b. 1934	Formose
Dam Goofed b. 1960	Barra b. 1950	La Favorite b. 1934	Biribi
Dam Goofed b. 1960	Barra b. 1950	La Favorite b. 1934	La Pompadour, family 17-b
