= Ballydoyle (horse) =

Canadian-bred Thoroughbred racehorse

- Sire: Northern Dancer
- Grandsire: Nearctic
- Dam: South Ocean
- Damsire: New Providence
- Sex: Stallion
- Foaled: 23 March 1980
- Country: Canada
- Colour: Bay
- Breeder: E. P. Taylor
- Owner: Robert Sangster
- Trainer: Vincent O'Brien
- Record: 3: 1–1–0

Awards
- Timeform rating 101

Ballydoyle (23 March 1980 – 2000) was a Thoroughbred racehorse who sold for a record-setting $3.5 million ($12.1 million inflation adjusted) as a Yearling in 1981. He showed average ability on the racecourse, winning one race in Ireland as a two-year-old.

== Background ==
Ballydoyle was a bay horse bred in Ontario by E P Taylor the owner of Windfields Farm. He was one of many important winners sired by Northern Dancer, that won the Kentucky Derby in 1964 before becoming one of the most successful breeding stallions in Thoroughbred history. His dam, South Ocean, had previously produced Northernette (also sired by Northern Dancer), the champion filly of her generation in Canada at two and three years of age. Four years later she produced Storm Bird, the top-rated European two-year-old of 1980.

The yearling was sent to the Keeneland Sales in July 1981 where he was sold for a then world-record price of $3.5 million by the bloodstock agency BBA (Ireland) on behalf of the British businessman Robert Sangster. The colt was sent to Europe where he was trained by Vincent O'Brien: he was named after O'Brien's training base at Ballydoyle, County Tipperary.

== Racing career ==
After finishing unplaced on his racecourse debut he contested a one-mile maiden race at Leopardstown Racecourse in October. He went clear of his rivals a furlong from the finish but was caught in the final strides and beaten a neck by the Edward O'Grady-trained Putney Bridge. In November he started at odds of 2/5 for a six-furlong maiden at Naas Racecourse. He led from the start and won by three lengths from Glenhurst and eleven others.

== Stud record ==
Ballydoyle was retired from racing and became a breeding stallion in California. He sired several minor winners but none of any importance. He died in 2000.

== Pedigree ==
Pedigree of Ballydoyle (CAN), bay stallion, 1980
Sire Northern Dancer (CAN) 1961	Nearctic (CAN); 1954	Nearco	Pharos
Sire Northern Dancer (CAN) 1961	Nearctic (CAN); 1954	Nearco	Nogara
Sire Northern Dancer (CAN) 1961	Nearctic (CAN); 1954	Lady Angela	Hyperion
Sire Northern Dancer (CAN) 1961	Nearctic (CAN); 1954	Lady Angela	Sister Sarah
Sire Northern Dancer (CAN) 1961	Natalma (USA); 1957	Native Dancer	Polynesian
Sire Northern Dancer (CAN) 1961	Natalma (USA); 1957	Native Dancer	Geisha
Sire Northern Dancer (CAN) 1961	Natalma (USA); 1957	Almahmoud	Mahmoud
Sire Northern Dancer (CAN) 1961	Natalma (USA); 1957	Almahmoud	Arbitrator
Dam South Ocean (CAN) 1967	New Providence (CAN); 1956	Bull Page	Bull Lea
Dam South Ocean (CAN) 1967	New Providence (CAN); 1956	Bull Page	Our Page
Dam South Ocean (CAN) 1967	New Providence (CAN); 1956	Fair Colleen	Preciptic
Dam South Ocean (CAN) 1967	New Providence (CAN); 1956	Fair Colleen	Fairvale
Dam South Ocean (CAN) 1967	Shining Sun (CAN); 1962	Chop Chop	Flares
Dam South Ocean (CAN) 1967	Shining Sun (CAN); 1962	Chop Chop	Sceptical
Dam South Ocean (CAN) 1967	Shining Sun (CAN); 1962	Solar Display	Sun Again
Dam South Ocean (CAN) 1967	Shining Sun (CAN); 1962	Solar Display	Dark Display (Family 4-j)

Records
Preceded by Lichine	Most expensive Thoroughbred colt yearling 1981 – 1982	Next: Empire Glory
