= Jolypha =

American-bred Thoroughbred racehorse

- Sire: Lyphard
- Grandsire: Northern Dancer
- Dam: Navajo Princess
- Damsire: Drone
- Sex: Mare
- Foaled: 20 April 1989
- Country: France
- Colour: Bay
- Breeder: Juddmonte Farms
- Owner: Khalid Abdullah
- Trainer: André Fabre; Robert J. Frankel
- Record: 10: 4-2-1
- Earnings: £509,462

Major wins
- Prix de Diane (1992); Prix Vermeille (1992)

Jolypha (20 April 1989 – 26 March 2005) was a French Thoroughbred racehorse and broodmare. A full-sister to the European champion Dancing Brave, she proved herself one of the best three-year-old fillies in the world in 1992, winning the Prix de Diane and Prix Vermeille on turf in Europe before running third on dirt against male opposition in the Breeders' Cup Classic. She was permanently transferred to the United States in the following year but won only one minor race in four attempts. She was then retired to become a broodmare in Kentucky, where her record as a producer of winners was moderate. She died in 2005 at the age of sixteen.

== Background ==
Jolypha was a bay mare with a white star bred in Kentucky by Juddmonte Farms, the breeding arm of the Saudi Prince Khalid Abdullah's racing organisation. She was sired by Lyphard, an American-bred stallion who raced in France, winning the Prix Jacques Le Marois and Prix de la Forêt in 1972. Lyphard became a very successful breeding stallion in both Europe and North America, siring Three Troikas, Dancing Brave, Dancing Maid and Manila. Jolypha's dam, Navajo Princess, won sixteen races including the Molly Pitcher Handicap. Navajo Princess was a descendant of the mare Stolen Kiss, who was the ancestor of notable racehorses including the Epsom Derby winner Henbit and the Kentucky Derby winner Lucky Debonair. Navajo Princess had achieved renown as a broodmare by producing Jolypha's full brother Dancing Brave. the filly was sent to race in France where she was trained by André Fabre.

== Racing career ==
=== 1992: three-year-old season ===
Jolypha did not race as a two-year-old, making her debut in the Prix Dorina over 1600 metres at Saint-Cloud Racecourse on 25 April 1992 and winning by a length from La Sarcelle. A month later she was moved up in class to contest the Group One Prix Saint Alary over 2000 metres at Longchamp Racecourse in which she was ridden for the first time by Pat Eddery, who partnered her in all her remaining races in 1992. She turned into the straight in eighth place, before making progress and finished second, a short head behind her stablemate Rosefinch and a head in front of the Prix du Calvados winner Verveine.

On 14 June, Jolypha was one of twelve fillies to contest the 143rd running of the Prix de Diane over 2100 metres at Chantilly Racecourse. Rosefinch and Verveine were again in opposition along with Urban Sea, Garendare (winner of the Prix Cléopâtre), Oumaldaaya (Lupe Stakes), Sheba Dancer (Prix Vanteaux) and Guislaine (Prix d'Aumale). Jolypha took the lead from Oumaldaaya 400 metres from the finish and won by a length and a short head from Sheba Dancer and Verveine.

After a three-month break, Jolypha returned in the Prix Vermeille at Longchamp on 13 September and started the 8/5 favourite. Verveine and Urban Sea were among her opponents, whilst the other contenders included Market Booster (Pretty Polly Stakes), Linnga (Prix Minerve) and Cunning (Galtres Stakes). Jolypha entered the straight in sixth place and briefly struggled to obtain a clear run before producing a strong finish to overtake Cunning in the last strides to win by a head. Urban Sea took third ahead of Verveine and Market Booster. On 4 October, Jolypha contested France's most prestigious race, the Prix de l'Arc de Triomphe. She was restrained towards the rear of the field before making some progress in the straight but never looked likely to win and finished eighth of the eighteen runners behind Subotica. Four weeks later, the filly was sent to the United States to contest the ninth running of the Breeders' Cup Classic, run that year at Gulfstream Park in Florida. She was the only three-year-old filly in the race and started a 16/1 outsider in a fourteen-runner field. After racing in seventh place for much of the way she made steady progress in the straight and finished third behind A.P. Indy and Pleasant Tap. Her third-place finish remains the best by a three-year-old filly in the race, and was the best by any female horse until Zenyatta finished second in 2010.

=== 1993: four-year-old season ===
In 1993, Jolypha was relocated to the United States where she was trained by Robert J. Frankel. She won on her seasonal debut, taking an allowance race over eight and a half furlongs on turf at Hollywood Park Racetrack in May and then looked unlucky in running when finishing second to Flawlessly in the Grade I Beverly D. Stakes over the same track a month later. She finished sixth of the seven runners behind Flawlessly in the Ramona Handicap at Del Mar racetrack in August and was then matched against male opposition in the Goodwood Handicap on dirt at Santa Anita Park in October, finishing fourth behind Lottery Winner.

== Breeding record ==
Jolypha was retired from racing to become a broodmare for Juddmonte Farms. She produced eleven foals, four of whom won minor races, between 1995 and 2005.

- Eaton Square, a bay colt, foaled in 1995, sired by Nureyev. Won two races.
- Cosh, brown filly, 1996, by A.P. Indy. Unraced.
- Seek the Light, bay colt (later gelded), 1997, by Seeking The Gold. Failed to win in thirteen races.
- Jolly Prospect, bay colt, 1998, by Mr. Prospector
- Lifelong, bay filly, 1999, by Mr. Prospector
- Jigsaw Piece, brown filly, 2000, by Deputy Minister
- Arum Lily, bay filly, 2001, by Woodman. Won both her races.
- Minimize, bay colt, 2002, by Chester House. Fifth in only race.
- Apartment, brown filly, 2003, by Aptitude
- Plaza, bay filly, 2004, by Chester House. Won one race.
- Mythical Hero, bay colt (later gelded), 2005, by Empire Maker. Failed to win in two races, won three times from forty-one starts in North America.

Jolypha died on 26 March 2005 after suffering a ruptured intestine during the birth of her last foal. The farm's manager Garrett O'Rourke said "She was really a beautiful mare, a real looker, but experienced hard luck with her foals.

== Pedigree ==
Pedigree of Jolypha, bay mare, 1989
Sire Lyphard (USA) 1969	Northern Dancer (CAN); 1961	Nearctic	Nearco
Sire Lyphard (USA) 1969	Northern Dancer (CAN); 1961	Nearctic	Lady Angela
Sire Lyphard (USA) 1969	Northern Dancer (CAN); 1961	Natalma	Native Dancer
Sire Lyphard (USA) 1969	Northern Dancer (CAN); 1961	Natalma	Almahmoud
Sire Lyphard (USA) 1969	Goofed (USA); 1960	Court Martial	Fair Trial
Sire Lyphard (USA) 1969	Goofed (USA); 1960	Court Martial	Instantaneous
Sire Lyphard (USA) 1969	Goofed (USA); 1960	Barra	Formor
Sire Lyphard (USA) 1969	Goofed (USA); 1960	Barra	La Favorite
Dam Navajo Princess (USA) 1974	Drone (USA); 1966	Sir Gaylord	Turn-To
Dam Navajo Princess (USA) 1974	Drone (USA); 1966	Sir Gaylord	Somethingroyal
Dam Navajo Princess (USA) 1974	Drone (USA); 1966	Cap and Bells	Tom Fool
Dam Navajo Princess (USA) 1974	Drone (USA); 1966	Cap and Bells	Ghanzi
Dam Navajo Princess (USA) 1974	Olmec (USA); 1966	Pago Pago	Matrice
Dam Navajo Princess (USA) 1974	Olmec (USA); 1966	Pago Pago	Pompilia
Dam Navajo Princess (USA) 1974	Olmec (USA); 1966	Chocolate Beau	Beau Max
Dam Navajo Princess (USA) 1974	Olmec (USA); 1966	Chocolate Beau	Otra (Family 3-d)
