= My Charmer =

American-bred Thoroughbred racehorse

- Sire: Poker
- Grandsire: Round Table
- Dam: Fair Charmer
- Damsire: Jet Action
- Sex: Mare
- Foaled: 1969
- Country: United States
- Colour: Bay
- Breeder: Ben S. Castleman
- Owner: Ben S. Castleman
- Trainer: Larry Robideaux
- Record: 32: 6–4–2
- Earnings: US$34,133

Major wins
- Fair Grounds Oaks (1972)

Honours
- My Charmer Handicap at Calder Race Course

My Charmer (March 25, 1969 – December 4, 1993) was an American Thoroughbred racehorse best known as an outstanding broodmare.

== Background ==
My Charmer was a bay mare bred by Ben Castleman in Kentucky. She was sired by Bowling Green Handicap winner Poker, a son of U.S. Racing Hall of Fame inductee Round Table. Her dam was Fair Charmer, a daughter of Jet Action, a multiple stakes race winner for Maine Chance Farm.

== Racing career ==
Trained by Larry Robideaux, My Charmer won six of her thirty-two starts, with her most notable win coming in the Grade II Fair Grounds Oaks in 1972. However, My Charmer is most remembered as a broodmare.

== Breeding record ==
My Charmer produced eleven foals. Her first was for owner Ben Castleman in 1974 and was her most successful. By Bold Reasoning, Seattle Slew became the 1977 U.S. Triple Crown champion, won four Eclipse Awards, was inducted into the U.S. Racing Hall of Fame, and was the Leading sire in North America in 1984 and the Leading broodmare sire in North America in 1995 and 1996.

My Charmer's mating to Northern Dancer produced Lomond in 1980, the 1983 winner of the British Classic, the 2,000 Guineas.

From her mating to Northern Dancer's son, English Triple Crown winner, Nijinsky, in 1984 My Charmer produced Seattle Dancer, who was sold as a yearling at the 1985 Keeneland July Yearling Sale for US$13.1 million (equal to about $38.3 million today).

My Charmer died at age twenty-four in 1993 and is buried at Gerald J. Ford's Diamond A Farm near Versailles, Kentucky.
