= Snaafi Dancer =

American-bred Thoroughbred racehorse

- Sire: Northern Dancer
- Grandsire: Nearctic
- Dam: My Bupers
- Damsire: Bupers
- Sex: Stallion
- Foaled: 25 February 1982
- Country: United States
- Colour: Bay
- Breeder: Donald T. Johnson (Crescent Farm)
- Owner: Aston Upthorpe Stud
- Trainer: John L. Dunlop
- Record: unraced

Snaafi Dancer (foaled February 25, 1982) was a Thoroughbred racehorse who was the first yearling to sell for more than US$10 million ($32.2 million in current dollars).

== Breeding ==
Bred by Donald T. Johnson under the name of his Crescent Farm, he was out of the mare My Bupers and sired by Northern Dancer whom the National Thoroughbred Racing Association calls "one of the most influential sires in Thoroughbred history." Snaafi Dancer joins nine other descendants of Northern Dancer who clinch the entire list of the ten most expensive colts sold at auction (current to 2014).

His dam, My Bupers, had previously produced several winners including the American Champion Sprint Horse My Juliet and the Champagne Stakes winner Lyphard's Special.

== Sale ==
Sent to the 1983 Keeneland Select Sale, bidding opened on the yearling at $1 million, passed the previous record forty-five seconds later with a bid price of $4.5 million, and finally closed at a new record price of $10.2 million to Sheikh Mohammed's Aston Upthorpe Stud. Looking for a Northern Dancer horse that could be a foundation stallion for his breeding operations – as had happened with chief rival Coolmore Stud – Sheikh Mohammed not only paid a new highest price ever for a yearling, but the highest price for any thoroughbred ever sold at auction at that time.

== Career ==
Snaafi Dancer never raced. It was reported that he was so slow in training that it would have been embarrassing to run him in public. He was retired to stud duty where he was discovered to have fertility problems. From two years of breeding, he sired only four foals, three of which raced with very limited success. Snaafi Dancer was last reported as being at a farm in Florida.

== Pedigree ==
Pedigree of Snaafi Dancer (USA), bay stallion, 1982
Sire Northern Dancer (CAN) 1961	Nearctic (CAN); 1954	Nearco	Pharos
Sire Northern Dancer (CAN) 1961	Nearctic (CAN); 1954	Nearco	Nogara
Sire Northern Dancer (CAN) 1961	Nearctic (CAN); 1954	Lady Angela	Hyperion
Sire Northern Dancer (CAN) 1961	Nearctic (CAN); 1954	Lady Angela	Sister Sarah
Sire Northern Dancer (CAN) 1961	Natalma (USA); 1957	Native Dancer	Polynesian
Sire Northern Dancer (CAN) 1961	Natalma (USA); 1957	Native Dancer	Geisha
Sire Northern Dancer (CAN) 1961	Natalma (USA); 1957	Almahmoud	Mahmoud
Sire Northern Dancer (CAN) 1961	Natalma (USA); 1957	Almahmoud	Arbitrator
Dam My Bupers (USA) 1967	Bupers (USA); 1961	Double Jay	Balladier
Dam My Bupers (USA) 1967	Bupers (USA); 1961	Double Jay	Broomshot
Dam My Bupers (USA) 1967	Bupers (USA); 1961	Busanda	War Admiral
Dam My Bupers (USA) 1967	Bupers (USA); 1961	Busanda	Businesslike
Dam My Bupers (USA) 1967	Princess Revoked (USA); 1959	Revoked	Blue Larkspur
Dam My Bupers (USA) 1967	Princess Revoked (USA); 1959	Revoked	Gala Belle
Dam My Bupers (USA) 1967	Princess Revoked (USA); 1959	Miss Muffet	Challedon
Dam My Bupers (USA) 1967	Princess Revoked (USA); 1959	Miss Muffet	Bona Via (Family 6-a)

Records
Preceded by Empire Glory	Most expensive Thoroughbred colt yearling July 19, 1983 – July 23, 1985	Next: Seattle Dancer
