= Jalil (horse) =

American-bred Thoroughbred racehorse

- Sire: Storm Cat
- Grandsire: Storm Bird
- Dam: Tranquility Lake
- Damsire: Rahy
- Sex: Stallion
- Foaled: 2004
- Country: United States
- Colour: Dark Bay
- Breeder: Martin & Pamela Wygod
- Owner: Godolphin Stables
- Trainer: Saeed bin Suroor
- Record: 16: 4-2-1
- Earnings: $345,788

Major wins
- Al Maktoum Challenge, Round 3 (2008)

Jalil, (foaled February 15, 2004), is an American Thoroughbred racehorse. Jalil was purchased in 2005 as a yearling for US$9.7 million (equal to about $16 million today).

== Background ==
Jalil was foaled on February 15, 2004, at Mill Ridge Farm in Lexington, Kentucky. His sire is two-time Sire of the Year Storm Cat, grandson of Northern Dancer, whom the National Thoroughbred Racing Association calls "one of the most influential sires in Thoroughbred history". Jalil joins nine other descendants of Northern Dancer who clinch the entire list of the ten most expensive colts sold at auction (current to 2014).

Jalil's dam is the multiple Grade 1 (Gamely Stakes, Clement L. Hirsch Stakes)-winning mare Tranquility Lake, sired by Rahy. This makes him a full-brother to the multiple Grade 1 winning racehorse After Market.

Consigned by Mill Ridge Farm on behalf of his breeders, Martin & Pamela Wygod, Jalil was purchased in 2005 as a yearling for $9.7 million by Sheikh Mohammed, representing the Godolphin Racing Operation at the September Yearling Sale. Afterwards, he was sent to Europe and placed in the care of trainer Saeed bin Suroor.

== Racing career ==
=== 2006: two-year-old season ===
Jalil made his highly anticipated racing debut as a two-year-old in October, finishing sixth in a maiden race at Newmarket Racecourse in Suffolk, England.

=== 2007: three-year-old season ===
After nearly seven months of freshening, Jalil returned to the races in May, finished a strong second in a maiden race at Newbury Racecourse in Berkshire, England. He finally broke his maiden in his third start, a maiden race at Ripon Racecourse in North Yorkshire, England. He then finished second in the Leads The Way Handicap at Lingfield Park in Lingfield, Surrey in October. Afterwards, he was rested for the remainder of the year in anticipation of his four-year-old campaign.

=== 2008: four-year-old season ===
Jalil's first start on the dirt was a winning effort in his first start as a four-year-old in the Meydan Marina Handicap in February at Nad Al Sheba Racecourse in Dubai. He followed up this triumph with back-to-back authoritative scores in the Zawaj Handicap and the Group 2 Maktoum Challenge Stakes, both at Nad Al Sheba. His final race at Nad Al Sheba was in the $6,000,000 GI Dubai World Cup, where he finished eighth behind, among others, 2007 Horse of the Year Curlin.

Jalil made his North American debut on August 30, 2008, at Suffolk Downs in East Boston, Massachusetts. Running in the $50,000 Waquoit Stakes, he finished third at 1-5 odds. It is believed that the race was an attempt to get in a prep race over the Suffolk strip in preparation for the $500,000 Massachusetts Handicap, also at Suffolk Downs, scheduled for September 20, 2008. However, he wouldn't race again that year.

=== Remainder of racing career ===
Back in Dubai, Jalil would race seven more times throughout 2011, but would never win again. His best results were two fifth-place finishes in Condition races.

== Stud career ==
Jalil was exported to China in 2011 to stand at stud to "support the emergence of the Chinese thoroughbred industry." In 2013 he passed into private local ownership.
