= Lomond (horse) =

American-bred Thoroughbred racehorse and sire (1980–2003)

- Sire: Northern Dancer
- Grandsire: Nearctic
- Dam: My Charmer
- Damsire: Poker
- Sex: Stallion
- Foaled: 3 February 1980
- Country: United States
- Colour: Bay
- Breeder: Warner L. Jones, William S. Farish III and William S. Kilroy
- Owner: Robert Sangster
- Trainer: Vincent O'Brien
- Record: 7: 3-2-0
- Earnings: $166,049

Major wins
- Gladness Stakes (1983); 2000 Guineas Stakes (1983)
- Last updated on 5 July 2024

Lomond (3 February 1980 – 16 October 2003) was an American-bred, Irish-trained Thoroughbred racehorse and sire. He is best known for winning the 1983 Classic 2000 Guineas Stakes.

== Background ==
Lomond was a bay horse bred in Kentucky by the partnership of Warner L. Jones, William S. Farish III and William S. Kilroy. He was sold as a foal in a private transaction for US$1.5 million to British racing's leading owner, Robert Sangster. Sangster had built a highly successful stable from Lomond's sire Northern Dancer, the most successful sire of the 20th century whom the National Thoroughbred Racing Association calls "one of the most influential sires in Thoroughbred history".

Lomond's dam was My Charmer, a granddaughter of U.S. Racing Hall of Fame inductee Round Table. My Charmer was an outstanding broodmare who produced Lomond's half-brother Seattle Slew, the 1977 U.S. Triple Crown champion, and Seattle Dancer.

== Racing career ==
Lomond made only seven lifetime starts, winning the 1983 Gladness Stakes at the Curragh Racecourse in Ireland and the Classic 2000 Guineas Stakes at Newmarket.

== Stud record ==
As a sire in Ireland, Lomond notably produced:

- Dark Lomond (1985) - winner of the 1988 Irish St. Leger
- Varadavour (1989) - won Carleton F. Burke Handicap
- Marling - (1989) - won Cheveley Park Stakes, Irish 1000 Guineas, Coronation Stakes, Sussex Stakes
- N B Forrest (1992) - a three-time winner of the Battlefield Stakes at Monmouth Park Racetrack.
- Valanour (1992) - wins include two Group Ones, the Grand Prix de Paris and Prix Ganay.

== Pedigree ==
Pedigree of Lomond (USA), bay stallion, 1980
Sire Northern Dancer (CAN) 1961	Nearctic (CAN); 1954	Nearco	Pharos
Sire Northern Dancer (CAN) 1961	Nearctic (CAN); 1954	Nearco	Nogara
Sire Northern Dancer (CAN) 1961	Nearctic (CAN); 1954	Lady Angela	Hyperion
Sire Northern Dancer (CAN) 1961	Nearctic (CAN); 1954	Lady Angela	Sister Sarah
Sire Northern Dancer (CAN) 1961	Natalma (USA); 1957	Native Dancer	Polynesian
Sire Northern Dancer (CAN) 1961	Natalma (USA); 1957	Native Dancer	Geisha
Sire Northern Dancer (CAN) 1961	Natalma (USA); 1957	Almahmoud	Mahmoud
Sire Northern Dancer (CAN) 1961	Natalma (USA); 1957	Almahmoud	Arbitrator
Dam My Charmer (USA) 1969	Poker (USA); 1963	Round Table	Princequillo
Dam My Charmer (USA) 1969	Poker (USA); 1963	Round Table	Knight's Daughter
Dam My Charmer (USA) 1969	Poker (USA); 1963	Glamour	Nasrullah
Dam My Charmer (USA) 1969	Poker (USA); 1963	Glamour	Striking
Dam My Charmer (USA) 1969	Fair Charmer (USA); 1959	Jet Action	Jet Pilot
Dam My Charmer (USA) 1969	Fair Charmer (USA); 1959	Jet Action	Busher
Dam My Charmer (USA) 1969	Fair Charmer (USA); 1959	Myrtle Charm	Alsab
Dam My Charmer (USA) 1969	Fair Charmer (USA); 1959	Myrtle Charm	Crepe Myrtle (Family 13-c)
