= Forestry (horse) =

American-bred Thoroughbred racehorse (1996–2023)

- Sire: Storm Cat
- Grandsire: Storm Bird
- Dam: Shared Interest
- Damsire: Pleasant Colony
- Sex: Stallion
- Foaled: May 9, 1996
- Died: December 27, 2023 (aged 27)
- Country: United States
- Colour: Bay
- Breeder: Robert S. Evans
- Owner: Aaron & Marie Jones
- Trainer: Bob Baffert
- Record: 11: 7–1–2
- Earnings: $531,225

Major wins
- King's Bishop Stakes (1999); Dwyer Stakes (1999); San Pedro Stakes (1999)
- Last updated on August 25, 2007

Forestry (May 9, 1996 – December 27, 2023) was an American Thoroughbred racehorse. He was sired by Storm Cat out of the mare Shared Interest, by Pleasant Colony.

Of his 11 starts, Forestry was in the money 10 times.

Ridden by Chris Antley, he won the King's Bishop Stakes, setting a stakes record of 1:21 flat to beat the old record that had stood for 28 years and defeating graded stakes race winners Yes Its True and Vicar.

Forestry's win in the Dwyer Stakes at Belmont Park equaled the record time set by Holy Bull.

== Retirement ==
Upon his retirement in 2000, Forestry went to stud at Taylor Made Stallions in Nicholasville, Kentucky at a starting fee of $50,000. This rose over time to his highest stud fee of $125,000 in 2007. Among his progeny are Grade I winners Discreet Cat, Diplomat Lady, and Forest Danger, and graded stakes winners Smokey Glacken, Old Forester, and Woodlander. He also sired the 2011 Preakness Stakes winner, Shackleford.

At the Fasig-Tipton Florida auction in February 2006, Coolmore Stud paid a world-record auction price of $16 million for a Florida-bred two-year-old colt in training by Forestry out of Magical Masquerade by Unbridled. The colt was named The Green Monkey and was retired in 2008 after failing to break his maiden in his three career starts.

In 2014, after shuttling for several years to the southern hemisphere for their breeding season, Forestry was sold to Haras São José da Serra, a stud farm in Brazil. His last U.S. crop, where he covered 40 mares, were 2-year-olds in 2017.

Forestry died in Paraná, Brazil on December 27, 2023, at the age of 27.
