= Storm Cat =

American-bred Thoroughbred racehorse (1983–2013)

- Sire: Storm Bird
- Grandsire: Northern Dancer
- Dam: Terlingua
- Damsire: Secretariat
- Sex: Stallion
- Foaled: February 27, 1983
- Died: 24 April 2013 (aged 30)
- Country: USA
- Color: Dark bay
- Breeder: W. T. Young Storage Inc.
- Owner: William T. Young
- Trainer: Jonathan E. Sheppard
- Record: 8: 4–3–0
- Earnings: $570,610

Major wins
- Young America Stakes (1985)

Awards
- Leading sire in North America (1999, 2000); Leading broodmare sire in North America (2012, 2013, 2014)

Storm Cat (February 27, 1983 – April 24, 2013) was an American Thoroughbred racehorse and stallion whose breeding fee during the peak of his stud career was $500,000, the highest in North America at the time. He was the leading sire in North America in 1999 and 2000, and the leading juvenile (two-year-old) sire a record seven times. He sired 108 graded stakes winners and eight champions, including Giant's Causeway, who also became a leading sire. Although best known as a sire, Storm Cat was one of the best two-year-old racehorses of his generation, winning the Grade I Young America Stakes and finishing second in the Breeders' Cup Juvenile.

== Background ==
Storm Cat was a dark bay horse with a white star and stripe on his forehead and white socks on his left feet. He was sired by Storm Bird, a son of Northern Dancer. His dam was Terlingua, an outstanding sprinter who was sired by Secretariat. William T. Young of Overbrook Farm purchased Terlingua in partnership with Bill Lockridge, who arranged the mating with Storm Bird. Lockridge then sold his share of Terlingua to Young, who thus became Storm Cat's breeder of record.

Storm Cat was foaled at Derry Meeting Farm in Pennsylvania. As a yearling in July 1984, Young intended to offer Storm Cat at the Keeneland Sales. However, Storm Cat tested positive for equine viral arteritis (EVA), and had to be withdrawn. "It was funny", said Young in a later interview. "Storm Cat might have tested positive for EVA, but he never had it. Anyway, Keeneland wanted me to bring him back in the September sale, but I just decided to keep him and race him." He was trained by Jonathan Sheppard, who was best known as a steeplechase trainer.

Storm Cat stood 16 hands (64 inches, 163 cm) high at maturity. He was a high-spirited, well-built horse with a powerful hip, but suffered from offset knees. Peppermints were his favorite treat.

Storm Cat was the focus of the well-received 2002 nonfiction book "Stud: Adventures in Breeding" by author Kevin Conley.

== Racing career ==
Storm Cat made his racing debut on August 11, 1985, at Saratoga racetrack, finishing second. He then won his next two starts, a maiden special weight race at Saratoga on August 21 and an allowance race at the Meadowlands on September 9. He then finished second in the World Appeal Stakes on September 28 before winning the Grade I Young America Stakes on October 10, both races held at the Meadowlands.

Storm Cat entered the 1985 Breeders' Cup Juvenile as the favorite and led by as much as three lengths down the stretch. In the last strides however, he was run down by Tasso and finished second by a nose. "If he had won that race," said Young, "he would have been a champion, and I think I would have been able to finally sell him."

Instead, Storm Cat underwent surgery over the winter for bone chips in his knees, then suffered a tendon injury. He returned to the racetrack in October 1986, winning an allowance race at the Meadowlands and finishing fourth in the Annapolis Stakes. He was kept in training at age four but was never fit enough to race. He retired with a record of four wins from eight starts.

== Stud career ==
Storm Cat retired to stud at Overbrook Farm in Lexington, Kentucky in 1988 with modest expectations. His initial stud fee was $30,000, dropping to $20,000 in 1991. Even at this price, demand was low so Young would sometimes enter into foal-sharing agreements with the owners of quality mares – Young would pay the stud fee in exchange for part ownership of the resulting foal. In some cases, Young even gave seasons away for free to keep Storm Cat's stud career alive.

Storm Cat's first crop of 39 foals started racing in 1991 and were only moderately successful, with average earnings of just $16,850. Even so, two members of that crop eventually became Grade I winners. When his second crop started racing in 1992, he started to establish a reputation as the sire of fast, precocious two-year-olds. He was the leading juvenile sire in North America in 1992, a title he would earn a record seven times (1992, 1993, 1995, 1998, 1999, 2002, and 2004). The previous record holder was Bold Ruler with six such titles.

In 1994, Young received the Eclipse Award for Outstanding Breeder, in no small part due to the success of Storm Cat's son Tabasco Cat, who won the Preakness Stakes and Belmont Stakes.

In 1995, Storm Cat's stud fee increased to $100,000, which was considered a bargain after yearlings from that crop sold for an average of $500,000. The crop foaled in 1996 included Aljabr, a multiple Group One winner in Europe on the turf, and Cat Thief, a Grade I winner in America on the dirt whose wins included the 1999 Breeders' Cup Classic. These wins propelled Storm Cat to the top of the North American sire list in 1999.

Storm Cat's next crop included 'iron horse' Giant's Causeway, who won five straight Group One races in Europe and then finished second in the 2000 Breeders' Cup Classic. Storm Cat repeated as the leading sire in North America, and also finished second in the standings for Great Britain and Ireland.

The crop foaled in 1998 was the first to average more than $1 million at auction and included Black Minnaloushe, who won the Irish 2,000 Guineas and St. James's Palace Stakes. Storm Cat's stud fee increased to $200,000 in 1999, then to $300,000 in 2001. From 2002 to 2007, his fee was $500,000, the highest in North America at the time. His yearlings continued to be in high demand, reaching a peak in 2005 when 28 of his offspring were sold for an average price of $1,763,750. At the September 2004 Keeneland yearling sales, a Storm Cat colt since named Mr. Sekiguchi sold for $8 million, and in the 2005 sale, another of his colts, Jalil, sold for $9.7 million. The price was the highest ever paid for a yearling sold at the Keeneland September sale and is third-highest overall. All told, 462 of his yearlings were sold at auction for a total of about $319 million, including 91 yearlings that brought $1 million or more.

In 2008, Storm Cat remained in high demand with a fee of $300,000 but was retired from service because of declining fertility. Of 30 mares covered that year, only three were reported in foal.

In 2009, Storm Cat's services were offered to Quarter Horse breeders using artificial insemination, which is not allowed with Thoroughbreds. He sired one graded stakes winner this way, named Stray Cat. In 2015, it was announced that two clones of Storm Cat had been produced, though one subsequently died in a paddock accident. The clone is not considered a Thoroughbred by the rules established by The Jockey Club and the plan is to use him to breed polo ponies.

At the time of his death in April 2013, he had sired 35 grade/group one winners, eight champions, 108 winners of group or graded stakes races, and 180 stakes winners worldwide, who have earnings in excess of $128 million.

"For years Storm Cat has been very aware of who he is," said stallion manager Wes Lanter. "I've been fortunate to work around a couple of really great horses. I think the top ones kind of have that attitude in them that says, 'I am the best.' And I think part of that attitude is imparted on their progeny, and that, as much as good conformation, ability, tenacity and desire, is key to the success of a horse."

Group/Grade 1 winners by Storm Cat
Foaled	Name	Sex	Major Wins
1989	Harlan	c	Vosburgh
1989	November Snow	f	Test, Alabama Stakes
1990	Desert Stormer	f	Breeders' Cup Sprint
1990	Missed the Storm	f	Test
1990	Mistle Cat	c	Premio Vittorio Di Capua
1991	Sardula	f	Hollywood Starlet, Kentucky Oaks
1991	Tabasco Cat	c	Preakness, Belmont
1993	Hennessy	c	Hopeful
1993	Silken Cat	f	Mazarine Stakes
1994	Aldiza	f	Go For Wand Handicap
1994	Sharp Cat	f	Del Mar Debutante, Santa Anita Oaks, Acorn, Beldame, Ruffian, etc.
1995	Catinca	f	Ruffian
1996	Tactical Cat	c	Hollywood Futurity
1996	Aljabr	c	Prix de Salamandre, Sussex, Lockinge
1996	Cat Thief	c	Breeders Futurity, Breeders' Cup Classic
1996	Forestry	c	King's Bishop
1997	Giant's Causeway	c	St. James Palace, Sussex, Eclipse, Juddmonte International, Irish Champion
1997	High Yield	c	Hopeful, Blue Grass
1997	Finders Fee	f	Matron, Acorn
1998	Raging Fever	f	Matron, Frizette, Ogden Phipps
1998	Black Minnaloushe	c	Irish 2000 Guineas, St. James Palace
1999	Sophisticat	f	Coronation
2000	Dessert	f	Del Mar Oaks
2000	Hold That Tiger	c	Grand Criterium
2000	Storm Flag Flying	f	Matron, Frizette, Breeders' Cup Juvenile Fillies, Personal Ensign
2000	Nebraska Tornado	f	Prix de Diane
2001	One Cool Cat	c	National Stakes
2001	Good Reward	c	Hollywood Derby, Manhattan
2001	Denebola	f	Prix Marcel Boussac
2002	Sweet Catomine	f	Del Mar Debutante, Breeders' Cup Juvenile Fillies, Santa Anita Oaks
2002	Consolidator	c	Breeders' Futurity
2003	Bluegrass Cat	c	Haskell
2003	After Market	c	Charles Whittingham, Eddie Read
2004	Mr Sidney	c	Maker's Mark Mile
2005	Life Is Sweet	f	Santa Margarita, Breeders' Cup Ladies Classic

Champions sired by Storm Cat include:

- Silken Cat (1995 Canadian Champion 2yo filly)
- Aljabr (1998 Cartier Award Champion 2yo colt)
- Giant's Causeway (2000 Cartier Award Horse of the Year
- Hold That Tiger (2002 Cartier Award Champion 2yo colt)
- Storm Flag Flying (2002 American Champion 2yo filly)
- Denebola (2003 Champion 2yo filly in France)
- One Cool Cat (2003 Cartier Award Champion 2yo colt)
- Sweet Catomine (2004 American Champion 2yo filly)

=== Sire of sires and broodmares ===
Storm Cat is also a noted sire of other successful stallions. By far his most successful son at stud was Giant's Causeway, who was a three-time leading sire in North America. Like Storm Cat, Giant's Causeway produced Grade/Group One winners on both turf and dirt, and left behind several promising sons at stud, including dual French classic winner Shamardal.

Storm Cat also left behind numerous other sons at stud, including Harlan, Hennessy, Forest Wildcat, Forestry, Stormy Atlantic, Tale of the Cat, and Bernstein. These sons have also produced further generations of good sires such as his grandson Harlan's Holiday and great-grandson Scat Daddy, the sire of 2018 Triple Crown winner Justify. Bluegrass Cat and Freud are successful regional sires in California and New York. Tiger Ridge became a successful sire when exported to South Africa.

His daughters have also made him a noteworthy broodmare sire. He was the leading broodmare sire in North America from 2012 to 2014 and has been in the top 10 every year between 2005 and 2015. Progeny produced by daughters of Storm Cat include:

- Speightstown, 2004 Breeders' Cup Sprint winner and Champion Sprinter
- Folklore, 2005 Breeders' Cup Juvenile Fillies winner and Champion 2-Year Old Filly
- Bodemeister
- Close Hatches, 2014 Champion Older Female Horse
- Shared Belief, 2013 Champion 2yo male horse
- Honor Code, 2015 Champion Older Male Horse
- Kizuna (JPN), winner of the 2013 Tōkyō Yūshun
- Real Steel (JPN), winner of the 2016 Dubai Turf; sired 2025 Saudi Cup and Breeders' Cup Classic winner Forever Young
- Loves Only You (JPN), full sister of Real Steel and winner of the 2021 Breeders' Cup Filly & Mare Turf
- Lord Kanaloa (JPN), JRA Hall of Fame nominee and sire of Almond Eye and Panthalassa

Closest ancestor of two triple crown winners

Storm Cat is the great-grandsire of American Pharoah, winner of the 2015 U.S. Triple Crown and the great-great-grandsire of Justify, winner of the 2018 U.S. Triple Crown. No other horse appears within five generations of both champions' bloodlines.

== Death ==
Young died in 2004 and the Overbrook stock was dispersed in 2009. However, Storm Cat remained at the farm until his death at the age of 30 on April 24, 2013. He was euthanized due to the infirmities of old age. He may also have been suffering from cancer at the time, but it was felt the testing would have been too taxing for a horse of his age.

== Pedigree ==
Pedigree of Storm Cat (USA), bay stallion, 1983
Sire Storm Bird (CAN) 1978	Northern Dancer (CAN); 1961	Nearctic	Nearco
Sire Storm Bird (CAN) 1978	Northern Dancer (CAN); 1961	Nearctic	Lady Angela
Sire Storm Bird (CAN) 1978	Northern Dancer (CAN); 1961	Natalma	Native Dancer
Sire Storm Bird (CAN) 1978	Northern Dancer (CAN); 1961	Natalma	Almahmoud
Sire Storm Bird (CAN) 1978	South Ocean (CAN); 1967	New Providence	Bull Page
Sire Storm Bird (CAN) 1978	South Ocean (CAN); 1967	New Providence	Fair Colleen
Sire Storm Bird (CAN) 1978	South Ocean (CAN); 1967	Shining Sun	Chop Chop
Sire Storm Bird (CAN) 1978	South Ocean (CAN); 1967	Shining Sun	Solar Display
Dam Terlingua (USA) 1976	Secretariat (USA); 1970	Bold Ruler	Nasrullah
Dam Terlingua (USA) 1976	Secretariat (USA); 1970	Bold Ruler	Miss Disco
Dam Terlingua (USA) 1976	Secretariat (USA); 1970	Somethingroyal	Princequillo
Dam Terlingua (USA) 1976	Secretariat (USA); 1970	Somethingroyal	Imperatrice
Dam Terlingua (USA) 1976	Crimson Saint (USA); 1969	Crimson Satan	Spy Song
Dam Terlingua (USA) 1976	Crimson Saint (USA); 1969	Crimson Satan	Papila
Dam Terlingua (USA) 1976	Crimson Saint (USA); 1969	Bolero Rose	Bolero
Dam Terlingua (USA) 1976	Crimson Saint (USA); 1969	Bolero Rose	First Rose (Family 8-c)
