= Royal Whip Stakes =

Flat horse race in Ireland

- Class: Group 3
- Location: Curragh Racecourse; County Kildare, Ireland
- Inaugurated: 1821
- Race type: Flat / Thoroughbred
- Sponsor: Fitzdares
- Website: www.curragh.ie

Race information
- Distance: 1m 2f (2,012 metres)
- Surface: Turf
- Track: Right-handed
- Qualification: Three-years-old and up
- Weight: 8 st 13 lb (3yo); 9 st 6 lb (4yo+); Allowances; 3 lb for fillies and mares Penalties; 5 lb for G1 / G2 winners 3 lb for G3 winners * * since 1 January
- Purse: €51,700 (2022); 1st: €32,450

Royal Whip Stakes
2026
A Boy Named Susie	Charles Fort	Omni Man

Previous years
2025
Zahrann	Tangapour	Galen
2024
Continuous	Trustyourinstinct	Caught U Looking
2023
Layfayette	Unless	Helvic Dream
2022
Luxembourg	Insinuendo	Realism
2021
Earlswood	Reve De Vol	Finans Bay

2020-2011
2020
Armory	Numerian	Sinawann
2019
Buckhurst	Leo De Fury	Guaranteed
2018
Beautiful Morning	Deauville	Broadway
2017
Shamreen	Massif Central	Central Square
2016
Success Days	Fascinating Rock	Moonlight Magic
2015
Found	Answered	Highly Toxic
2014
Hall Of Mirrors	Kingsbarns	Parish Hall
2013
Maputo	Caponata	Fortify
2012
Famous Name	Born To Sea	Warwick Avenue
2011
Banimpire	Dunboyne Express	Mutahadee

2010-2001
2010
Fame And Glory	Dixie Music	Grand Admiral
2009
Casual Conquest	Curtain Call	Red Rock Canyon
2008
King Of Rome	Alarazi	Zulu Chief
2007
Eagle Mountain	Alexander Tango	Decado
2006
Mustameet	Chelsea Rose	Soar With Eagles
2005
Tropical Lady	Cairdeas	Latino Magic
2004
Solskjaer	Tropical Lady	Medicinal
2003
High Chaparral	Imperial Dancer	In Time's Eye
2002
Chancellor	Sights On Gold	Jammaal
2001
Bach	Jammaal	Exaltation

2000-1991
2000
Takali	Molomo	Jammaal
1999
Zomaradah	Strategic	Polaire
1998
Make No Mistake	Sunshine Street	Quws
1997
King Alex	Rayouni	Oscar Schindler
1996
Pilsudski	I'm Supposin	Predappio
1995
Shemaran	Russian Snows	Al Mohaajir
1994
Dancing Sunset	Blue Judge	Cajarian
1993
Rayseka	Royal Ballerina	Arbusha
1992
Jahafil	Mining Tycoon	In A Tiff
1991
George Augustus	Santella Bell	Nordic Soprano

1990-1988
1990
Splash Of Colour	Ile De Nisky	Smaoineamh
1989
Beyond The Lake	Tyrone Bridge	Elementary
1988
Heavenly Manna	Eurobird	Lord Bud

The Royal Whip Stakes is a Group 3 flat horse race in Ireland open to thoroughbreds aged three years or older. It is run over a distance of 1 mile and 2 furlongs (2,012 metres) at the Curragh in August.

== History ==
The event was established in 1821, and it was originally a long-distance race for horses aged four or older. It was named after its trophy, a gold-handled whip presented to the Irish Turf Club by King George IV. It was initially one of a series of races known as the Royal Plates.

The trophy was replaced by a new whip provided by King William IV in 1830. The event was opened to three-year-olds in 1832. It was limited to Irish-bred horses for a period after the 1860s.

The Royal Whip Stakes was cut to 2 1/2 miles in 1925, and to 2 miles in 1936. Its original prize fund of 100 guineas remained unchanged until 1954. From this point it was contested over 1 1/2 miles.

The race was given Group 3 status in the early 1970s. It was shortened to 1 1/4 miles in 1995, and promoted to Group 2 level in 1998. It was relegated back to Group 3 in 2013.

With its 206th edition in 2026, the Royal Whip Stakes is Ireland's oldest continuously run horse race.

== Records ==
Most successful horse (3 wins):

- Roller – 1822, 1824, 1825
- Skylark – 1830, 1831, 1832

Leading jockey since 1950 (7 wins):

- Michael Kinane – Kamakura (1985), Beyond the Lake (1989), Rayseka (1993), King Alex (1997), Make No Mistake (1998), Bach (2001), High Chaparral (2003)

Leading trainer since 1950 (13 wins):

- Vincent O'Brien – Ross Sea (1959), Bally Joy (1965), Reindeer (1970), Tantoul (1971), Manitoulin (1972), Cavo Doro (1973), Alleged (1977, 1978), Last Light (1981), Lords (1982), Empire Glory (1984), Baba Karam (1987), Splash of Colour (1990)

== Winners since 1977 ==
Year	Winner	Age	Jockey	Trainer	Time
1977	Alleged	3	Peadar Matthews	Vincent O'Brien	2:43.20
1978	Alleged	4	Lester Piggott	Vincent O'Brien	2:36.40
1979	The Bart	3	Christy Roche	Ted Curtin
1980	My Hollow	5	Declan Gillespie	Jim Bolger
1981	Last Light	3	Pat Eddery	Vincent O'Brien
1982	Lords	3	Pat Eddery	Vincent O'Brien
1983	Condell	4	Declan Gillespie	Jim Bolger
1984	Empire Glory	3	Pat Eddery	Vincent O'Brien
1985	Kamakura	3	Michael Kinane	Dermot Weld
1986	Dubian	4	Pat Eddery	Alec Stewart
1987	Baba Karam	3	Declan Gillespie	Vincent O'Brien	2:34.30
1988	Heavenly Manna	3	Christy Roche	Paddy Mullins	2:46.80
1989	Beyond the Lake	3	Michael Kinane	Dermot Weld	2:35.50
1990	Splash of Colour	3	John Reid	Vincent O'Brien	2:32.20
1991	George Augustus	3	Johnny Murtagh	John Oxx	2:54.80
1992	Jahafil	4	Willie Carson	Dick Hern	2:36.20
1993	Rayseka	3	Michael Kinane	John Oxx	2:35.90
1994	Dancing Sunset (Note: Blue Judge finished first in 1994, but he was relegated to second place following a stewards' inquiry)	3	Christy Roche	Aidan O'Brien	2:34.00
1995	Shemaran	3	Johnny Murtagh	John Oxx	2:02.90
1996	Pilsudski	4	Walter Swinburn	Michael Stoute	2:03.00
1997	King Alex	4	Michael Kinane	Roger Charlton	2:04.80
1998	Make No Mistake	3	Michael Kinane	Dermot Weld	2:01.80
1999	Zomaradah	4	John Reid	Luca Cumani	2:04.00
2000	Takali	3	Johnny Murtagh	John Oxx	2:13.70
2001	Bach	4	Michael Kinane	Aidan O'Brien	2:12.20
2002	Chancellor	4	Michael Hills	Barry Hills	2:11.10
2003	High Chaparral	4	Michael Kinane	Aidan O'Brien	2:04.80
2004	Solskjaer	4	Jamie Spencer	Aidan O'Brien	2:02.90
2005	Tropical Lady	5	Kevin Manning	Jim Bolger	2:07.60
2006	Mustameet	5	Declan McDonogh	Kevin Prendergast	2:07.30
2007	Eagle Mountain	3	Kieren Fallon	Aidan O'Brien	2:15.59
2008	King of Rome (Note: The 2008 running took place at Leopardstown)	3	Johnny Murtagh	Aidan O'Brien	2:12.84
2009	Casual Conquest	4	Pat Smullen	Dermot Weld	2:15.74
2010	Fame and Glory	4	Johnny Murtagh	Aidan O'Brien	2:06.62
2011	Banimpire	3	Kevin Manning	Jim Bolger	2:10.43
2012	Famous Name	7	Pat Smullen	Dermot Weld	2:19.39
2013	Maputo	3	Joe Fanning	Mark Johnston	2:08.13
2014	Hall of Mirrors	4	Seamie Heffernan	Aidan O'Brien	2:11.46
2015	Found	3	Seamie Heffernan	Aidan O'Brien	2:09.88
2016	Success Days	4	Shane Foley	Ken Condon	2:13.27
2017	Shamreen	4	Pat Smullen	Dermot Weld	2:11.44
2018	Beautiful Morning	5	Colm O'Donoghue	Jessica Harrington	2:09.63
2019	Buckhurst	3	Donnacha O'Brien	Joseph O'Brien	2:13.99
2020	Armory	3	Seamie Heffernan	Aidan O'Brien	2:10.84
2021	Earlswood	3	Shane B Kelly	Johnny Murtagh	2:09.26
2022	Luxembourg	3	Ryan Moore	Aidan O'Brien	2:10.84
2023	Layfayette	6	Colin Keane	Noel Meade	2:07.41
2024	Continuous	4	Ryan Moore	Aidan O'Brien	2:04.09
2025	Zahrann	3	Ben Coen	Johnny Murtagh	2:06.84
2026	A Boy Named Susie	3	Oisin Murphy	Donnacha O'Brien	2:05.23

== Earlier winners ==
- 1821: Langar
- 1822: Roller
- 1823: Langar
- 1824: Roller
- 1825: Roller
- 1826: Miss Foote
- 1827: Balderdash
- 1828: Paddy Whack
- 1829: Napoleon
- 1830: Skylark
- 1831: Skylark
- 1832: Skylark
- 1833: Napoleon
- 1834: Thump
- 1835: Rust
- 1836: Exchange
- 1837: Harkaway
- 1838: Cregane
- 1839: Retriever
- 1840: St Lawrence
- 1841: Great Wonder
- 1842: Bangor
- 1843: Fairy Queen
- 1844: King Dan
- 1845: The Switcher
- 1846: Burgundy
- 1847: Rat Trap
- 1848: Dough
- 1849: The Baroness
- 1850: Marchioness d'Eu
- 1851: Kick Up the Dust
- 1852: Chaseaway
- 1853: Chaseaway
- 1854: Doctor O'Toole
- 1855: The Chicken
- 1856: The Chicken
- 1857: The Tattler
- 1858: Agitation
- 1859: Hibernia
- 1860: Shamrock
- 1861: The Lawyer
- 1862: Castle Hackett
- 1863: Tourist
- 1864: Woodman
- 1865: Lord Conyngham
- 1866: Dunsany
- 1867: Columbus
- 1868: Aneroid
- 1869: The Scout
- 1870: Finesse
- 1871: Trieste
- 1872: Speculation
- 1873: Bedouin
- 1874: Christmas
- 1875: Ingomar
- 1876: Fair Alice
- 1877: Piersfield
- 1878: Matilda
- 1879: Sisyphus
- 1880: Miriam
- 1881: Miriam
- 1882: Buckshot
- 1883: Peace
- 1884: Xema
- 1885: Sylvan Queen
- 1886: Sylvan Queen
- 1887: Campanula
- 1888: Little John
- 1889: Little John
- 1890: Golden Crescent
- 1891: Chatterbox
- 1892: Red Prince
- 1893: Golden Ring
- 1894: Starlight
- 1895: The Jew
- 1896: Aline
- 1897: Gustaloga
- 1898: The Falloch
- 1899: Lillian Noel
- 1900: The Falloch
- 1901: Glenmalur
- 1902: Driftwood
- 1903: Sylvan Park
- 1904: Sylvan Park
- 1905: Claret Lass
- 1906: Claret Lass
- 1907: Mrs Lyons
- 1908: Bouncing Bess
- 1909: Octocide
- 1910: Lorello
- 1911: Castle Jewel
- 1912: Master of Light
- 1913: Laoghaire
- 1914: Bachelor's Fiasco
- 1915: Garrus
- 1916: Scarlet Rambler
- 1917: Noham
- 1918: King Frusquin
- 1919: Earn's Glen
- 1920: Red Flag
- 1921: Coup d'Essai
- 1922: Carthage
- 1923: Mullagher-a-Boo
- 1924: Blue Fish
- 1925: Jillsome
- 1926: Philanderer
- 1927: Lomond's Lake
- 1928: Tan Girl
- 1929: Swift Agnes
- 1930: Nice Token
- 1931: Sahabelle
- 1932: Cloverdale
- 1933: Song of the Hills
- 1934: Theorosa
- 1935: Sol Erin
- 1936: Harvest Star
- 1937: Kildonan's Hope
- 1938: Corofin
- 1939: Dennison
- 1940: Antrim
- 1941: Etoile de Lyons
- 1942: Anniversary
- 1943: Blue Speck
- 1944: Rhodes
- 1945: Golden Spur
- 1946: Spring Offensive
- 1947: Lorimer
- 1948: Signal Service
- 1949: Eastern Gem
- 1950: L'Horizon
- 1951: Storm Beacon
- 1952: Beau Sire
- 1953: Sunny Streak
- 1954: Hidalgo
- 1955: Zarathustra
- 1956: Jongleur
- 1957: Solartickle
- 1958: Irish Penny
- 1959: Ross Sea
- 1960: Avril Sprite
- 1961: Azurine
- 1962: Gay Challenger
- 1963: Nos Royalistes
- 1964: Cassim
- 1965: Bally Joy
- 1966: Wedding Present
- 1967: Vendor
- 1968: Stitch
- 1969: Candy Cane
- 1970: Reindeer
- 1971: Tantoul
- 1972: Manitoulin
- 1973: Cavo Doro
- 1974: Klairvimy
- 1975: Consol
- 1976: Yankee Gold

== See also ==
- Horse racing in Ireland
- List of Irish flat horse races
