= Seattle Dancer =

American-bred Thoroughbred racehorse

- Sire: Nijinsky
- Grandsire: Northern Dancer
- Dam: My Charmer
- Damsire: Poker
- Sex: Stallion
- Foaled: 1984
- Country: United States
- Colour: Bay
- Breeder: Warner L. Jones, William S. Farish III, William S. Kilroy
- Owner: Stavros Niarchos, Susan Magnier, Robert Sangster, Vincent O'Brien, Daniel Schwartz
- Trainer: Vincent O'Brien
- Record: 5: 2–1–1
- Earnings: £111,303

Major wins
- Gallinule Stakes (1987); Derrinstown Stud Derby Trial (1987)

Seattle Dancer (April 22, 1984 – June 2, 2007) was an Irish Thoroughbred racehorse who in 1985 became the world's most expensive yearling ever sold at public auction.

== Background ==
Seattle Dancer was bred in Kentucky by Warner L. Jones, William S. Farish III, and William S. Kilroy. The partnership owned his important dam, My Charmer. My Charmer was the dam of 1977 U.S. Triple Crown winner, Seattle Slew. Seattle Dancer's sire was the 1971 British Triple Crown winner and Champion sire, Nijinsky, who was a son of Northern Dancer, whom the National Thoroughbred Racing Association calls "one of the most influential sires in Thoroughbred history". As of 2014, Seattle Dancer joins nine other descendants of Northern Dancer who clinch the entire list of the ten most expensive colts sold at auction.

In July 1985, Seattle Dancer was sent to the Keenland selected yearling sale where intense bidding on behalf of major breeders such as Allen Paulson and Sheikh Mohammed drove his selling price to a world record US$13.1 million (equal to about $39.2 million today). Seattle Dancer's new owners were Stavros Niarchos (Greece), Susan Magnier and her father, Vincent O'Brien (Ireland), Robert Sangster (England), and a California businessman, Daniel Schwartz.

== Racing career ==
The colt was sent to Ballydoyle in Ireland, but a virus swept through the stables that kept a weakened Seattle Dancer out of racing as a two-year-old. Conditioned by Vincent O'Brien, and raced in the colors of Stavros Niarchos, in his April 1987 debut Seattle Dancer finished third in a race at the Curragh Racecourse in Ireland. He then won the Group 3 Gallinule Stakes at the Curragh and the Group 2 Derrinstown Stud Derby Trial at Leopardstown Racecourse. In his next start, at Longchamp Racecourse in Paris, France, he finished sixth in the Group 1 Prix du Jockey Club. At the same racecourse, in what would prove to be his final race, Seattle Dancer ran second in the Group 1 Grand Prix de Paris.

== Stud record ==
Seattle Dancer entered stud in 1988. He first stood at Coolmore's Ashford Stud in Kentucky then at their facility in Ireland. In 1997, he was sent to stand at East Stud in Japan and for his last five years, served stallion duty in Germany. During his career, Seattle Dancer sired 37 stakes race winners including:

- Seattle Rhyme - won the 1991 Racing Post Trophy
- Pike Place Dancer - winner of the 1996 Kentucky Oaks
- Que Belle - Champion filly in Germany, won 1997 Classics Preis der Diana (German Oaks) and the Henkel-Rennen
- Caffe Latte - won California's 2000 Santa Barbara and Ramona Handicaps

Seattle Dancer suffered a heart attack and died at age twenty-three on June 2, 2007, at Gestüt Auenquelle in Rödinghausen, North Rhine-Westphalia.

Pedigree of Seattle Dancer
Sire Nijinsky	Northern Dancer	Nearctic	Nearco
Sire Nijinsky	Northern Dancer	Nearctic	Lady Angela
Sire Nijinsky	Northern Dancer	Natalma	Native Dancer
Sire Nijinsky	Northern Dancer	Natalma	Almahmoud
Sire Nijinsky	Flaming Page	Bull Page	Bull Lea
Sire Nijinsky	Flaming Page	Bull Page	Our Page
Sire Nijinsky	Flaming Page	Flaring Top	Menow
Sire Nijinsky	Flaming Page	Flaring Top	Flaming Top
Dam My Charmer	Poker	Round Table	Princequillo
Dam My Charmer	Poker	Round Table	Knight's Daughter
Dam My Charmer	Poker	Glamour	Nasrullah
Dam My Charmer	Poker	Glamour	Striking
Dam My Charmer	Fair Charmer	Jet Action	Jet Pilot
Dam My Charmer	Fair Charmer	Jet Action	Busher
Dam My Charmer	Fair Charmer	Myrtle Charm	Alsab
Dam My Charmer	Fair Charmer	Myrtle Charm	Crepe Myrtle

== See also ==
- Thoroughbred valuation

Records
Preceded by Snaafi Dancer	Most expensive Thoroughbred colt yearling July 23, 1985 – present	Incumbent
