= Robert Sangster =

British racehorse owner and breeder

- Born: Robert Edmund Sangster; 23 May 1936; Liverpool, England
- Died: 7 April 2004 (aged 67); London, England
- Education: Repton School
- Occupations: Businessman; Racehorse owner/breeder
- Years active: 1975–2004
- Spouse(s): Christine Street (m.1960-1978; divorced; 4 children); Susan Peacock (m. 1976-1978; annulled) (m. 1978-1985; divorced); Susan Lilley (m. 1985-2000; divorced; 2 children)
- Parent(s): Vernon Sangster; Margaret Smith

Robert Edmund Sangster (23 May 1936 – 7 April 2004) was a British businessman, thoroughbred racehorse owner and breeder. Sangster's horses won 27 European Classics and more than 100 Group One races, including two Epsom Derbys, four Irish Derbys, two French Derbys, three Prix de l'Arc de Triomphes, as well as the Breeders' Cup Mile and the Melbourne Cup. He was the British flat racing Champion Owner five times.

From the mid-1970s, in partnership with John Magnier and Vincent O'Brien, Sangster transformed the sport of thoroughbred horseracing. Their dramatic buying of American-bred yearlings at the Keeneland Sales in Kentucky led to tremendous success and established the Coolmore Stud in Ireland as one of the principal powers in the bloodstock world.

== Early years and business career ==
Sangster was the son of Vernon Sangster, who founded the Vernons Pools business in 1926, and his wife Peggy (Margaret) Smith. He was born in Liverpool and educated at Repton School, where he played cricket and boxed. He did National service with the Cheshire Regiment, winning a brigade heavyweight boxing championship in Berlin.

After National Service, Sangster joined the Vernons organisation, becoming managing director and then serving as chairman from 1980 to 1988. In that year, aware of plans for the creation of the National Lottery, he sold the Vernons Pools business to Ladbrokes for £90 million. Ladbrokes subsequently valued their acquisition at £1.

== Thoroughbred racing and breeding ==
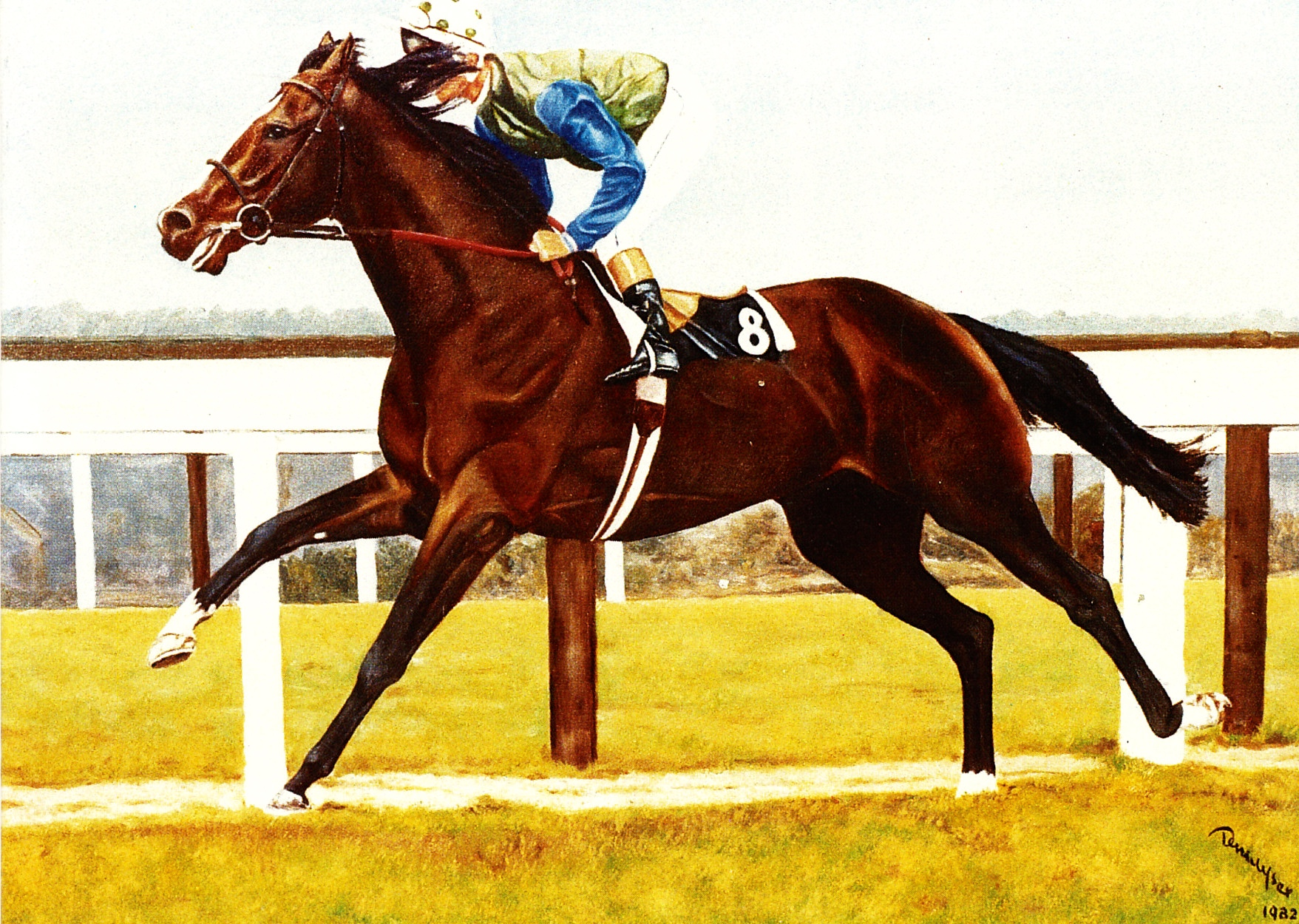
Assert, oil on canvas Painting by Bob Demuyser (1920-2003)

=== Beginnings ===
Sangster was introduced to thoroughbred racing through a friend, Nick Robinson, who recommended a bet on Chalk Stream, a horse owned by his grandfather, Sir Foster Robinson, in the 1960 Lincoln Handicap. Chalk Stream finished unplaced, but Sangster bought the horse as a wedding present for his fiancée and sent him to be trained by Eric Cousins. The horse won the Liverpool Autumn Cup that year and the Jubilee Handicap at Kempton Park the following May, hooking Sangster on racing. He started buying successful fillies with the aim of breeding his own horses and had his first win in a major flat race with Brief Star in the 1969 Ayr Gold Cup.

=== The Brethren ===
In October 1971 at Haydock Park, where he was sponsoring the Vernons Sprint Cup, Sangster was introduced to John Magnier, a stud farmer from County Cork who was then aged 23. Sangster entered into partnership with Magnier and the legendary Irish trainer Vincent O'Brien, investing in the Coolmore Stud in County Tipperary. The trio became known as "the Brethren". Their idea was to use Sangster's money to buy up the best yearlings at the Keeneland Sales in Kentucky, cornering the line of horses bred from the stallion Northern Dancer. Trained by O'Brien at his Ballydoyle stables these horses would go on to success on the track and command enormous fees standing at stud.

In 1975 they paid just under $1.8 million for a number of young horses, including The Minstrel, a colt by Northern Dancer out of Fleur, who went on to win The Derby in 1977. With the success of The Minstrel, Sangster and his partners established themselves as among the world's leading racehorse owners, going on to extraordinary success. Between 1977-84 Sangster was Britain's leading owner five times. There was a second Derby win in 1982 with Golden Fleece; three Prix de l'Arc de Triomphes, with Alleged, twice, in 1977 and 1978, and with Detroit in 1980; a Melbourne Cup victory with Beldale Ball, again in 1980; and a win in the Breeders' Cup Mile with Royal Heroine in 1984.

Initially, these horses were sold to stand at stud for syndicates at vast profits. The Minstrel, which had cost $200,000, was sold to America for $9 million; Alleged, bought for $175,000 as a two-year-old, went to Kentucky a year later for $16 million. These profits funded further purchases, but by the mid-1980s, beginning with Be My Guest, Coolmore began to have its own champion sires in residence. Two of Sangster's horses, Caerleon and Sadler's Wells, the latter bred at Sangster's Swettenham Stud, went on to be among the most successful stallions in the world. Sadler's Wells's legacy to Coolmore included Galileo and Montjeu, outstanding sires in their own right.

=== Yearling sales ===
Sangster continued to invest in yearlings in partnership with associates that included Danny Schwartz, who had made a fortune as a builder in California, and, from 1979, Stavros Niarchos, the Greek shipping tycoon and sometime rival of Sangster at the sales. In the mid-1980s competition, largely with buyers from the Middle East, pushed prices to extremely high levels. The average price at Keeneland's July Select Sale rose from $53,000 in 1975 to more than $600,000 in 1984. In the same period the average at Newmarket's Houghton Sales climbed from 7,600 guineas to 92,500 guineas. In 1983 Sheikh Mohammed al Maktoum paid $10.2 million at the Kentucky Sales for a yearling called Snaafi Dancer and two years later Sangster and his associates paid a record $13.1 million for Seattle Dancer. In response to these escalating prices, Sheikh Mohammed arranged two meetings in Dubai, the first with just Sangster and John Magnier, and a second including Vincent O'Brien and others. Although the details of these meetings were not revealed, what followed was a slump in bloodstock values at the sales of 1985 and 1986.

=== Breeding empire ===
Sangster's thoroughbred racing and breeding empire included interests in England, Australia, Venezuela, the United States, Ireland, France and New Zealand. In the early 1970s he partnered with Magnier in developing the now common practice of shuttling stallions between the northern and southern hemispheres, helping to internationalise racing in Australia. He had bought Swettenham, a 200-acre stud farm in Cheshire, when he was 28 and in 1985 he paid £6 million for the famous Manton House stables near Marlborough in Wiltshire, which became the centre of his racing operations in Britain. He first installed Michael Dickinson as the trainer but replaced him with Barry Hills, then Peter Chapple-Hyam and, latterly, John Gosden.

Sangster largely withdrew from buying at the yearling sales, instead selling horses bred at his own studs. He won his final English Classic with Las Meninas in the 1000 Guineas at Newmarket in 1994, but saw horses he had bred win major races for other owners, including Dr Devious, who won the Derby in 1992, Balanchine, which won the Oaks and the Irish Derby in 1994, and Carnegie, which won the Arc in the same year. In 1993 Sangster sold his interest in Coolmore, although he retained breeding rights to a number of stallions, notably Sadler's Wells and Danehill. His later breeding operations were focused mainly on Australia.

== Personal life ==
Sangster enjoyed a lively social life, entertaining lavishly in his box at the Royal Ascot. Barry Hills, who trained more than 30 Group-race winners for Sangster, said, "We celebrated when we won, and usually celebrated when we lost". The racing correspondent Julian Wilson said of Sangster: "His pleasures were boxing, champagne, golf, racing, and beautiful women, in no particular order, and often more than one at the same time."

Sangster was married and divorced three times. In May 1960 he married Christine Street, leaving her in 1976 (divorcing in 1978) for socialite Susan Peacock, the ex-wife of Australian Liberal Party politician Andrew Peacock. That marriage did not last, with Sangster having well-publicised affairs with Jerry Hall and Susan Lilley. Sangster married Lilley in 1985, divorcing in 2000. By his first wife he had three sons, Guy, Ben, and Adam, and a daughter, Kate. With Susan Lilley he had two sons, Sam and Max.

Sangster went into tax exile from the United Kingdom in 1975 and moved to the Isle of Man. Towards the end of his life he spent much of his time in Barbados and Australia.

== Death ==
Sangster died of pancreatic cancer in London, on 7 April 2004, aged 67.

== British Classic Race wins ==
- 1,000 Guineas: (1): Las Meninas (1994)
- 2,000 Guineas: (3): Lomond (1983), El Gran Senor (1984), Rodrigo de Triano (1992)
- Derby: (2): The Minstrel (1977), Golden Fleece (1982)
