= Keeneland Sales =

American throughbred auction house

Keeneland Sales is an American Thoroughbred auction house in Lexington, Kentucky founded in 1935 as a nonprofit racing/auction entity on 147 acres (0.59 km^{2}) of farmland west of Lexington, which had been owned by Jack O. Keene. A division of Keeneland Association, Inc., it holds three annual horse auctions that attract buyers from around the globe:

- January - Horses of All Ages

This sale, as its name implies, features horses of all ages, including breeding stock, horses of racing age and short yearlings. Breeding "seasons"—the rights to breed one mare to a specified stallion in a given year—are also sold at this auction.

- September - Yearling

This sale, the world's largest sale of yearlings, has been conducted at various times in the fall since 1944, and was permanently moved to September in 1960. Keeneland accepts all horses nominated to sale, making it the largest market for Thoroughbred yearlings in the world. Format changes instituted in 2010 introduced a three tier format for the sale that will differentiate animals by pedigree and conformation. "Select" sessions conducted at the beginning of the sale will be formalized, recognizing a practice present for some time. Following the Select sessions an extended 'Book 2' (offering a choicer grade of prospects) period of selling will precede the open yearling sessions that make up the latter half of the sale. In recent years, the September sale has produced multiple Kentucky Derby winners, an Epsom Derby winner, an American Horse of the Year, and a Triple Crown winner. The 2019 Sale saw a record single sale of $8.2 million for a filly offspring of Triple Crown winner American Pharoah.

- November - Breeding Stock

This sale primarily features broodmares and weanlings, with some stallions, horses in training and yearlings also offered. Stallion "shares"—ownership interests in specific stallions—and seasons are also sold at this auction. Over the years, this has become the world's largest sale of Thoroughbreds.

The July Selected Yearling Sale was discontinued in 2003 and the April Two-Year-Olds in Training Sale was discontinued in 2015. From 1943 to 2002, Keeneland conducted the July Selected Yearling sale. Numerous champions, including 11 Kentucky Derby winners, were sold here. The yearlings sold were selected by pedigree, and had to pass a physical conformation test before being allowed into the sales ring. When announcing changes to the format of the September Sale in March 2010, Keeneland president and CEO Nick Nicholson said consignor preference made a return of the July sale unlikely.

== See also ==
- Fasig-Tipton
- Thoroughbred valuation
