= 1977 in sports =

1977 in sports describes the year's events in world sport.

== Alpine skiing ==
- Alpine Skiing World Cup
  - Men's overall season champion: Ingemar Stenmark, Sweden
  - Women's overall season champion: Lise-Marie Morerod, Switzerland

== American football ==
- January 9 − Super Bowl XI: the Oakland Raiders (AFC) won 32−14 over the Minnesota Vikings (NFC)
  - Location: Rose Bowl
  - Attendance: 103,438
  - MVP: Fred Biletnikoff, WR (Oakland)
- October 9 - Eddie Brown sets NFL record for punt returns in a game (11).
- November 20 – Playing despite a 101 °F (38 °C) fever as a result of the flu, Chicago Bears running back Walter Payton sets a new single-game NFL rushing record, gaining 275 yards in a 10–7 victory over the Minnesota Vikings.
- December 11 – Tampa Bay Buccaneers in their second NFL season win their first ever game over the New Orleans Saints. The win ends their NFL record 26-game losing streak encompassing the entire 1976 season and the first 12 games in 1977.
- Sugar Bowl (1976 season):
  - The Pittsburgh Panthers won 27–3 over the Georgia Bulldogs to win the college football national championship

== Association football ==
- Liverpool dominate English and European football, winning both the European Cup and the Football League Championship, but they miss out on a "treble" by losing in the FA Cup final.
- January 18 – death of Luciano Re Cecconi (28), Lazio and Italy, who was shot during a hoax robbery
- October 1 - Pelé played the final game of his storied career at Giants Stadium in East Rutherford, New Jersey. He played the first half for his current club, the New York Cosmos, and the second half for his old Brazilian club Santos.

== Australian rules football ==
- Victorian Football League
  - May 7: Hawthorn kick 25.41 (191) against St. Kilda. That score breaks by seven the record for the most behinds by a team in a match, and by six the most scoring shots. Neither record has been equalled.
  - North Melbourne wins the 81st VFL Premiership (North Melbourne 9.22 (76) drew Collingwood Football Club 10.16 (76), replay North Melbourne 21.25 (151) d Collingwood 19.10 (124))
  - Brownlow Medal awarded to Graham Teasdale (South Melbourne)

== Baseball ==
- January 19 – Ernie Banks is elected to the Baseball Hall of Fame in his first year of eligibility. He won back-to-back MVP awards, but is best remembered for his famous line, "Let's play two".
- Sparky Lyle breaks Ron Perranoski's major league record for left-handers of 179 career saves.
- The Major League Baseball expansion Seattle Mariners and Toronto Blue Jays make their debuts (both are American League teams). It would be the last expansion in MLB until 1993.
- World Series – The New York Yankees defeat the Los Angeles Dodgers. This is the Series in which Reggie Jackson becomes known as "Mr. October."

== Basketball ==
- NCAA Men's Division I Basketball Championship –
  - Marquette wins 67–59 over North Carolina
- NBA Finals –Portland Trail Blazers won 4 games to 2 over the Philadelphia 76ers

== Boxing ==
- After 13 years and 82 contests, including 14 title defences, World Middleweight Champion Carlos Monzón retired undefeated.

== Canadian football ==
- Grey Cup – Montreal Alouettes won 41–6 over the Edmonton Eskimos
- Vanier Cup – Western Ontario Mustangs win 48–15 over the Acadia Axemen

== Cricket ==
- 12–17 March, Melbourne - Centenary Test played between Australia and England to commemorate 100th anniversary of first Test match. Australia won by 45 runs, exactly the same margin as in the first Test match in 1877.
- World Series Cricket begins playing games in competition to official International Cricket Council sanctioned matches.

== Cycling ==
- Giro d'Italia won by Michel Pollentier of Belgium
- Tour de France - Bernard Thévenet of France
- UCI Road World Championships – Men's road race – Francesco Moser of Italy

== Dogsled racing ==
- Iditarod Trail Sled Dog Race Champion –
  - Rick Swenson won with lead dogs: Andy & O.B. (Old Buddy)

== Figure skating ==
- World Figure Skating Championships –
  - Men's champion: Vladimir Kovalev, Soviet Union
  - Ladies' champion: Linda Fratianne, United States
  - Pair skating champions: Irina Rodnina & Alexander Zaitsev, Soviet Union
  - Ice dancing champions: Irina Moiseyeva & Andrei Minenkov, Soviet Union

== Golf ==
Men's professional

- Masters Tournament - Tom Watson
- U.S. Open - Hubert Green
- British Open - Tom Watson
- PGA Championship - Lanny Wadkins
- PGA Tour money leader - Tom Watson - $310,653
- Ryder Cup - United States won 12½ -7½ over Britain & Ireland in team golf. This was the last Ryder Cup to feature a side exclusively from the British Isles; the U.S. opponents in the next Ryder Cup, held in 1979 at White Sulphur Springs, West Virginia, would be drawn from all of Europe. The U.S.-Europe format has continued ever since.

Men's amateur

- British Amateur - Peter McEvoy
- U.S. Amateur - John Fought

Women's professional

- LPGA Championship - Chako Higuchi
- U.S. Women's Open - Hollis Stacy
- LPGA Tour money leader - Judy Rankin - $122,890

== Harness racing ==
- United States Pacing Triple Crown races –
  1. Cane Pace - Jade Prince
  2. Little Brown Jug - Governor Skipper
  3. Messenger Stakes - Governor Skipper
- United States Trotting Triple Crown races –
  1. Hambletonian - Green Speed
  2. Yonkers Trot - Green Speed
  3. Kentucky Futurity - Texas
- Australian Inter Dominion Harness Racing Championship –
  - Pacers: Stanley Rio

== Horse racing ==
- Red Rum wins the Grand National a third time

Steeplechases

- Cheltenham Gold Cup – Davy Lad
- Grand National – Red Rum

Flat races

- Australia – Melbourne Cup won by Gold and Black
- Canada – Queen's Plate won by Sound Reason
- France – Prix de l'Arc de Triomphe won by Alleged
- Ireland – Irish Derby Stakes won by The Minstrel
- English Triple Crown Races:
  1. 2,000 Guineas Stakes – Nebbiolo
  2. The Derby – The Minstrel
  3. St. Leger Stakes – Dunfermline
- United States Triple Crown Races:
  1. Kentucky Derby – Seattle Slew
  2. Preakness Stakes – Seattle Slew
  3. Belmont Stakes – Seattle Slew

== Ice hockey ==
- Art Ross Trophy as the NHL's leading scorer during the regular season: Guy Lafleur, Montreal Canadiens
- Hart Memorial Trophy for the NHL's Most Valuable Player: Guy Lafleur - Montreal Canadiens
- Stanley Cup – Montreal Canadiens defeat the Boston Bruins 4 games to 0.
- World Hockey Championship
  - Men's champion: Czechoslovakia defeated Sweden
  - Junior Men's champion: Soviet Union defeated Canada
- Avco World Trophy - Quebec Nordiques won 4 games to 3 over the Winnipeg Jets

== Radiosport ==
- Eighth amateur radio direction finding European Championship held in Skopje, Yugoslavia.
- First IARU Radiosport Championship held in July.

== Rugby league ==
- 1977 Amco Cup
- 1977 European Rugby League Championship
- 1977 New Zealand rugby league season
- 1976–77 Northern Rugby Football League season / 1977–78 Northern Rugby Football League season
- 1977 NSWRFL season - St George and Parramatta draw 9–9 in the Grand Final. St George takes the title by winning the replay 22–0.
- 1977 Pacific Cup
- 1977 Rugby League World Cup

== Rugby union ==
- 83rd Five Nations Championship series is won by France who complete the Grand Slam and do so by using the same 15 players in all four matches, the first time that an unchanged team has won the Grand Slam

== Snooker ==
- World Snooker Championship – John Spencer beats Cliff Thorburn 25-12
- World rankings – Ray Reardon remains world number one for 1977/78.

== Swimming ==
- July 3 – USA's Joseph Bottom sets a world record in the 50m freestyle at a swimming meet in Etobicoke, Ontario (Canada), clocking 23.74.

== Tennis ==
- Grand Slam in tennis men's results:
  1. Australian Open - January: Roscoe Tanner - December: Vitas Gerulaitis
  2. French Open - Guillermo Vilas
  3. Wimbledon championships - Björn Borg
  4. U.S. Open - Guillermo Vilas
- Grand Slam in tennis women's results:
  1. Australian Open – January: Evonne Goolagong - December: Kerry Reid
  2. French Open - Mima Jaušovec
  3. Wimbledon championships - Virginia Wade
  4. U.S. Open - Chris Evert
- Davis Cup – Australia won 3–1 over Italy in world tennis.

== Volleyball ==
- Men and Women's European Volleyball Championship held in Finland: both men's and women's tournaments won by USSR

== Yacht racing ==
- The New York Yacht Club retains the America's Cup as media mogul Ted Turner skippers Courageous to victory over challenger Australia, of the Sun City Yacht Club, 4 races to 0

== General sporting events ==
- Ninth Summer Universiade held in Sofia, Bulgaria

== Awards ==
- Associated Press Male Athlete of the Year – Steve Cauthen, Horse racing
- Associated Press Female Athlete of the Year – Chris Evert, Tennis
- ABC's Wide World of Sports Athlete of the Year: Steve Cauthen, Horse Racing
