= Travers Stakes top three finishers =

This is a listing of the horses that finished in either first, second, or third place and the number of starters in the Travers Stakes, an American Grade 1 race for three-year-olds at 1-1/4 miles on dirt held at Saratoga Race Course in Saratoga Springs, New York.

(List shows 1972–present; DH stands for dead heat, i.e., a tie)

Year	Winner	Second	Third	Starters
2026	Leading Change	Napoleon Solo	Golden Tempo	10
2025	Sovereignty	Bracket Buster	Magnitude	5
2024	Fierceness	Thorpedo Anna	Sierra Leone	8
2023	Arcangelo	Disarm	Tapit Trice	7
2022	Epicenter	Cyberknife	Zandon	8
2021	Essential Quality	Midnight Bourbon	Miles D	7
2020	Tiz the Law	Caracaro	Max Player	7
2019	Code of Honor	Tacitus	Mucho Gusto	12
2018	Catholic Boy	Mendelssohn	Bravazo	10
2017	West Coast	Gunnevera	Irap	12
2016	Arrogate	American Freedom	Gun Runner	13
2015	Keen Ice	American Pharoah	Frosted	10
2014	V.E. Day	Wicked Strong	Tonalist	10
2013	Will Take Charge	Moreno	Orb	9
2012	Alpha (DH); Golden Ticket (DH)		Fast Falcon	11
2011	Stay Thirsty	Rattlesnake Bridge	J W Blue	10
2010	Afleet Express	Fly Down	First Dude	11
2009	Summer Bird	Hold Me Back	Quality Road	7
2008	Colonel John	Mambo in Seattle	Pyro	12
2007	Street Sense	Grasshopper	Helsinki	7
2006	Bernardini	Bluegrass Cat	Dr. Pleasure	6
2005	Flower Alley	Bellamy Road	Roman Ruler	7
2004	Birdstone	The Cliff's Edge	Eddington	7
2003	Ten Most Wanted	Peace Rules	Strong Hope	6
2002	Medaglia d'Oro	Repent	Nothing Flat	9
2001	Point Given	E Dubai	Dollar Bill	9
2000	Unshaded	Albert the Great	Commendable	9
1999	Lemon Drop Kid	Vision and Verse	Menifee	8
1998	Coronado's Quest	Victory Gallop	Raffie's Majesty	7
1997	Deputy Commander	Behrens	Awesome Again	8
1996	Will's Way	Louis Quatorze	Skip Away	7
1995	Thunder Gulch	Pyramid Peak	Malthus	7
1994	Holy Bull	Concern	Tabasco Cat	5
1993	Sea Hero	Kissin Kris	Miner's Mark	11
1992	Thunder Rumble	Devil His Due	Dance Floor	10
1991	Corporate Report	Hansel	Fly So Free	6
1990	Rhythm	Shot Gun Scott	Sir Richard Lewis	13
1989	Easy Goer	Clevor Trevor	Shy Tom	6
1988	Forty Niner	Seeking the Gold	Brian's Time	8
1987	Java Gold	Cryptoclearance	Polish Navy	9
1986	Wise Times	Danzig Connection	Personal Flag	7
1985	Chief's Crown	Turkoman	Skip Trial	7
1984	Carr de Naskra	Pine Circle	Morning Bob	9
1983	Play Fellow	Slew o' Gold	Hyperborean	7
1982	Runaway Groom	Aloma's Ruler	Conquistador Cielo	5
1981	Willow Hour	Pleasant Colony	Lord Avie	10
1980	Temperence Hill	First Albert	Amber Pass	9
1979	General Assembly	Smarten	Private Account	7
1978	Alydar	Affirmed	Nasty and Bold	4
1977	Jatski	Run Dusty Run	Silver Series	14
1976	Honest Pleasure	Romeo	Dance Spell	8
1975	Wajima	Media	Prince Thou Art	5
1974	Holding Pattern	Little Current	Chris Evert	11
1973	Annihilate 'Em	Stop The Music	See the Jaguar	8
1972	Key To The Mint	Tentam	True Knight	7
