= 1977 Belmont Stakes =

American horse race

109th Belmont Stakes
- Belmont Stakes
- Grade I stakes race
- Location: Belmont Park; Elmont, New York, U.S.
- Date: June 11, 1977
- Winning horse: Seattle Slew
- Winning time: 2:29.6
- Jockey: Jean Cruguet
- Trainer: William H. Turner, Jr.
- Owner: Karen L. Taylor
- Conditions: Muddy
- Surface: Dirt
- Attendance: 70,229

The 1977 Belmont Stakes was the 109th running of the Belmont Stakes at Belmont Park in Elmont, New York held on June 11, 1977. With a field of eight horses, Seattle Slew won by four lengths in front of a crowd of 70,229 spectators. In conjunction with previously winning the Kentucky Derby and Preakness Stakes, Seattle Slew became the tenth horse to win the Triple Crown of Thoroughbred Racing, and the first to do so unbeaten. The race went off at 5:47 pm ET and was televised on CBS nationwide.

== Results ==
Finish	Post Position	Program Number	Horse	Jockey	Trainer	Owner	Final Odds (to 1)	Stakes
1	5	5	Seattle Slew	Jean Cruguet	William H. "Billy" Turner, Jr.	Karen L. Taylor	0.40	$109,080
2	1	2	Run Dusty Run	Sandy Hawley	Smiley Adams	Golden Chance Farm	5.10	$39,096
3	6	7	Sanhedrin	Jorge Velásquez	Lou Rondinello	Darby Dan Farm	6.50	$21,816
4	7	8	Mr. Red Wing	Jacinto Vásquez	LeRoy Jolley	John L. Greer	69.90	$10,908
5	2	3	Iron Constitution	Angel Cordero Jr.	Thomas F. Root Jr.	Harry T. Mangurian Jr.	7.40	−
6	8	9	Spirit Level	Antonio Graell	Stephen A. DiMauro	Meadow Stable	15.90	−
7	4	4	Sir Sir	Ruben Hernandez	Leo Azpurua Jr.	La Luna Stable	94.90	−
8	3	1A	Make Amends	Ron Turcotte	John P. Campo	Elmendorf Farm	57.20	−
scratched		1	Hey Hey J. P.	–	Fast Pierina Stable	John P. Campo	−	−
scratched		6	Leading Scorer	–	Elaine Brodsky	–	−	−

Times: 1/4 mile: :24.6, 1/2 mile: :48.4, 3/4mile: 1:14, 1 mile: 1:38.8, 1 1/4mile: 2:03.8, Final: 2:29.6

Note: times were kept to the fifth of a second.

=== Payout schedule ===
Program	Horse	Win	Place	Show
5	Seattle Slew	$2.80	$2.60	$2.20
2	Run Dusty Run	–	$3.20	$2.40
7	Sanhedrin	–	–	$2.60

== See also ==
- 1977 Kentucky Derby
- 1977 Preakness Stakes
