= 1977 Kentucky Derby =

Horse race

103rd Kentucky Derby
- Kentucky Derby
- Grade I stakes race
- Location: Churchill Downs
- Date: May 7, 1977
- Winning horse: Seattle Slew
- Jockey: Jean Cruguet
- Trainer: William H. Turner Jr.
- Owner: Karen L. Taylor
- Conditions: Fast
- Surface: Dirt
- Attendance: 124,038

The 1977 Kentucky Derby was the 103rd running of the Kentucky Derby. The race took place on May 7, 1977, with 124,038 people in attendance.

== Full results ==
Finished	Post	Horse	Jockey	Trainer	Owner	Time / behind
1st	3	Seattle Slew	Jean Cruguet	William H. Turner Jr.	Karen L. Taylor	2:02
2nd	1A	Run Dusty Run	Darrel McHargue	Smiley Adams	Golden Chance Farm	2
3rd	2	Sanhedrin	Jorge Velásquez	Lou Rondinello	Darby Dan Farm	3 1/4
4th	4	Get the Axe	Bill Shoemaker	William R. O'Neill	Bwamazon Farm	nose
5th	9	Steve's Friend	Ruben Hernandez	John W. Fulton	Kinsman Stable	nose
6th	14	Papelote	Miguel A. Rivera	Oswaldo Canet	Marvin L. Warner	2 1/4
7th	10	Giboulee	Jeffrey Fell	Jacques Dumas	Jean-Louis Levesque	head
8th	8	For the Moment	Ángel Cordero Jr.	LeRoy Jolley	Gerald Robins	3/4
9th	6	Affiliate	Laffit Pincay Jr.	Laz Barrera	Harbor View Farm	1 3/4
10th	5	Flag Officer	Lesli Ahrens	George J. Getz	Nasty Stable	1/2
11th	1	Bob's Dusty	Julio C. Espinoza	Smiley Adams	Robert N. Lehmann	neck
12th	12	Sir Sir	Jesus Rodriquez	Leo Azpurua Jr.	La Luna Stable	2
13th	11	Nostalgia	Larry Snyder	Delmer W. Carroll Sr.	William S. Farish III	3
14th	7	Western Wind	Ron Turcotte	James E. Picou	Joseph M. Roebling	10
15th	13	Best Person	Garth Patterson	Mike Tinker	W. Cal Partee	

== See also ==
- 1977 Preakness Stakes
- 1977 Belmont Stakes
