= Western Wind =

Western Wind may refer to:

== Music ==
- Westron Wynde, an early 16th-century song
- "Western Wind" (song), by Carly Rae Jepsen, 2022
- Western Wind, a 1995 album by Warren H Williams

== Literature ==
- Western Wind, a 1949 play by Charlotte Francis
- Western Wind, a historical romance novel series by Janelle Taylor
- Western Wind, a 1993 children's novel by Paula Fox
- The Western Wind, a 2018 novel by Samantha Harvey

== Other uses ==
- Western Wind, a Thoroughbred racehorse that ran in the 1977 Kentucky Derby

== See also ==
- West wind, a wind that originates in the west, and its representations in mythology and literature
