= Smiley Adams =

Thoroughbred racehorse trainer

Personal information
- Born: October 4, 1935 Versailles, Kentucky, United States
- Died: June 19, 2003 (aged 67) Lexington, Kentucky, United States
- Resting place: Blue Grass Memorial Gardens, Nicholasville, Kentucky

Horse racing career
- Sport: Horse racing
- Career wins: 750±

Major racing wins
- Black Gold Stakes (1974); Duncan F. Kenner Stakes (1974); Regret Stakes (1974, 1976); Louisiana Derby Trial Stakes (1975); Louisiana Derby (1975); Lexington Stakes (1975); Blue Grass Stakes (1975); Arch Ward Stakes (1976); Arlington-Washington Futurity Stakes (1976); Breeders' Futurity Stakes (1976); Kentucky Jockey Club Stakes (1976); Louisiana Handicap (1976); New Orleans Handicap (1976); Oaklawn Handicap (1976); Louisiana Derby Trial Stakes (1977); Spiral Stakes (1977 (2), 1978 (2), 1979, 1980 (2)); Hialeah Challenge Cup Invitational Stakes (1978); Seminole Handicap (1978); Arlington Classic (1980); Donn Handicap (1980); Illinois Derby (1980); Secretariat Stakes (1980); Tremont Stakes (1980); Arlington Handicap (1981); Dixie Stakes (1981); Phoenix Handicap (1982); U.S. Triple Crown series: Preakness Stakes (1975)

Racing awards
- Keeneland Leading Trainer (1975 (spring), 1977 (fall), 1978 (spring & fall)

Significant horses
- Bob's Dusty, Lot O' Gold, Master Derby, Run Dusty Run, Spruce Needles

William Ernest "Smiley" Adams (October 4, 1935 – June 19, 2003) was an American trainer of Thoroughbred racehorses who trained Master Derby to win the 1975 Preakness Stakes, the second leg of the U.S. Triple Crown series. In what was the 100th running of the Preakness, Darrel McHargue aboard Master Derby defeated Kentucky Derby winner Foolish Pleasure by a full-length.

Always known as "Smiley", William Adams left school at age 14 to work as a stableboy at a racetrack. Three years later, the then 17-year-old lied about his age to join the United States Marine Corps and would serve overseas in the Korean War. After being discharged from the military, Adams returned to horse racing.

In addition to his success with Master Derby, Adams also notably trained Run Dusty Run who finished second in the 1977 Kentucky Derby, third in the 1977 Preakness Stakes and second in the 1977 Belmont Stakes, all to Triple Crown winner Seattle Slew. Among his many stakes wins, Smiley Adams won seven consecutive runnings of the Spiral Stakes at Latonia Race Course in Kentucky.

Smiley Adams was retired from training and living in Nicholasville, Kentucky at the time of his death in 2003.
