= Iron Constitution =

American-bred Thoroughbred racehorse

- Sire: Iron Ruler
- Grandsire: Never Bend
- Dam: Water Cress
- Damsire: Hail To Reason
- Sex: Stallion
- Foaled: 1974
- Country: United States
- Color: Gray
- Breeder: Thomas M. Evans
- Owner: Mockingbird Farm (Harry T. Mangurian Jr.)
- Trainer: Thomas F. Root Jr.
- Record: 30: 4-3-5
- Earnings: US$171,444

Major wins
- Withers Stakes (1977)

Iron Constitution (1974–1989) was an American Thoroughbred racehorse owned by Harry T. Mangurian Jr.'s Mockingbird Farm of Ocala, Florida. Iron Constitution won the 1977 Withers Stakes and placed second three weeks later in the $200,000 grade 1 1977 Preakness Stakes to undefeated Seattle Slew who would go on to win that year's U.S. Triple Crown.

== Background ==
Iron Constitution was bred by Thomas Mellon Evans, a prominent Pennsylvania financier and a Thoroughbred racehorse owner and breeder who won the 1981 Kentucky Derby and 1981 Preakness Stakes. He was sired by Iron Ruler, a son of Never Bend, and out of the mare Water Cress, a daughter of Hail to Reason.

== Racing career ==
Iron Constitution had a very short racing career that only lasted from late in his two-year-old season until the middle of his four-year-old season. After breaking his maiden at Aqueduct Racetrack in his third attempt, he followed that up with a second-place finish in allowance company. In only his fifth lifetime start, his connections decided to take a big step up class and race him in a graded stakes race. That race was the one-turn Withers Stakes at one mile which he won in 1:37.00 under jockey Jorge Velásquez at Aqueduct Racetrack.

Three weeks later his trainer, Thomas F. Root Jr. decided to take a shot at the second jewel of the Triple Crown. The 1977 Preakness Stakes was run at a mile and three sixteenths on dirt at Pimlico Race Course in Baltimore, Maryland. In that race Iron Constitution was listed a 31-1 longshot in a field of ten stakes-winning colts. The prohibitive odds-on favorite was the undefeated Kentucky Derby winner Seattle Slew. Iron Constitution broke from near the outside and broke poorly in ninth in front of only Run Dusty Run. The fractions that day were blistering on the lead, with Jean Cruguet trying to slow Slew down under a "pull", finishing the first quarter mile in :223/5 and the half in :453/5. Just prior to Pimlico's famous "Clubhouse Turn" Iron Constitution's jockey Jorge Velásquez angled him in and slid between horses to reach the rail. He moved from ninth up tho seventh as he saved ground on both turns on the inside. Down the back stretch he moved up well into third behind only runner-up Seattle Slew and the front running leader Cormorant. Velasquez then took him outside at the top of the lane, and he willingly picked up the pace finishing the mile in 1:344/5. Cruguet applied a slight hand ride to Slew, who went on to win by two lengths. Iron Constitution finished second, two lengths in front of Run Dusty Run, who finished third, and took the 20% runner-up's share of the purse, equalling $30,000.

After his strong Preakness-placing performance in the Preakness Stakes, he went on to place in three other races that year, including the Grade 1 Jersey Derby. It was the last Jersey Derby ever held at Garden State Park Racetrack before a fire destroyed the property. He also placed second in the Woodlawn Stakes on the turf at Pimlico Race Course. He also showed in third place in two mile, and one sixteenth races on the dirt in the Monmouth Invitational Handicap (which is now called the Haskell Invitational Stakes at Monmouth Park Racetrack and the Dwyer Stakes at Belmont Park). At age four, he placed second in his last stakes race, the Cinema Handicap.

Iron Constitution was euthanized due to a fractured leg in June 1989 at Graywood, Livonia Center, New York, where he spent his stud career.
