= 1977 Preakness Stakes =

102nd running of the Preakness Stakes

102nd Preakness Stakes
- The Preakness Stakes
- Location: Pimlico Race Course, Baltimore, Maryland, United States
- Date: May 21, 1977
- Winning horse: Seattle Slew
- Jockey: Jean Cruguet
- Conditions: Fast
- Surface: Dirt

The 1977 Preakness Stakes was the 102nd running of the $200,000 Grade 1 Preakness Stakes thoroughbred horse race. The race took place on May 21, 1977, and was televised in the United States on ABC. Seattle Slew, who was jockeyed by Jean Cruguet, won the race by one and one half lengths over runner-up Iron Constitution. Approximate post time was 5:41 p.m. Eastern Time. The race was run on a fast track in a final time of 1:54-2/5. The Maryland Jockey Club reported total attendance of 77,346, this is recorded as second highest on the list of American thoroughbred racing top attended events for North America in 1977.

== Payout ==
The 102nd Preakness Stakes Payout Schedule

| Program Number | Horse Name | Win | Place | Show |
|---|---|---|---|---|
| 8 | Seattle Slew | US$2.80 | $2.80 | $2.20 |
| 7 | Iron Constitution | - | $12.20 | $5.00 |
| 9 | Run Dusty Run | - | - | $2.80 |

$2 Exacta: (8–7) paid $42.20

== The full chart ==
| Finish Position | Margin (lengths) | Post Position | Horse name | Jockey | Trainer | Owner | Post Time Odds | Purse Earnings |
|---|---|---|---|---|---|---|---|---|
| 1st | 0 | 8 | Seattle Slew | Jean Cruguet | Billy Turner | Karen L. Taylor | 0.40-1 favorite | $138,600 |
| 2nd | 11/2 | 7 | Iron Constitution | Jorge Velásquez | Thomas F. Root Sr. | Harry T. Mangurian Jr. | 30.90-1 | $30,000 |
| 3rd | 31/2 | 9 | Run Dusty Run | Darrel McHargue | Smiley Adams | Golden Chance Farm | 7.20-1 | $15,000 |
| 4th | 43/4 | 1 | Cormorant | Danny R. Wright | James P. Simpson | Charles T. Berry Jr. | 4.80-1 | $7,500 |
| 5th | 51/2 | 6 | J. O. Tobin | Bill Shoemaker | John H. Adams | El Peco Ranch | 6.50-1 | |
| 6th | 131/2 | 3 | Sir Sir | Roberto Pineda | Leo Azpurua Sr. | La Luna Stable | 86.30-1 | |
| 7th | 231/2 | 5 | Hey Hey J. P. | Ángel Cordero Jr. | John P. Campo | Fast Piarina Stable | 78.10-1 | |
| 8th | 233/4 | 2 | Counter Punch | Gregg McCarron | Glenn L. Ballenger | John E. Hughes | 75.40-1 | |
| 9th | 263/4 | 4 | Regal Sir | Chris McCarron | Carl F. Chapman | John B. W. Carmichael | 69.60-1 | |

- Winning Breeder: Ben S. Castleman; (KY)
- Winning Time: 1:54 2/5
- Track Condition: Fast
- Total Attendance: 77,346

== See also ==
- 1977 Kentucky Derby
- 1977 Belmont Stakes
