= Icelandic Women's Volleyball League =

Women's volleyball competition

Mizunodeild kvenna
- Current season, competition or edition: 2020–21 Mizunodeild kvenna
- Sport: Volleyball
- Founded: 1973
- First season: 1974
- Administrator: BLÍ
- No. of teams: 6 (2020–21)
- Country: Iceland
- Continent: Europe
- Most recent champion: Afturelding (4th title)
- Most titles: Þróttur Neskaupstað(8 titles)
- Level on pyramid: 1 Level
- Relegation to: 2nd League
- Domestic cups: Icelandic Cup; Icelandic Super Cup
- International cup: CEV Women's Champions League Qualifications

The Icelandic Women's Volleyball League is an annual competition for women's volleyball clubs in Iceland. It has been held since the 1973/74 season, till date it is ruled and managed by the Icelandic Volleyball Federation.

== History ==
6 teams participated in the 2020/21 championship in the top division: Afturelding ( Mosfellsbair ), HK Kópavogur ( Kopavogur ), KA Akureyri ( Akureyri ), Þróttur Neskaupstað ( Neskøypstadur ), Álftanes, Þróttur Reykjavík ( Reykjavik ). The title was won by Afturelding, who won the final series beating HK Kópavogur 2-1 (1: 3, 3: 1, 3: 0). The 3rd place was taken by KA Akureyri.

=== List of Champions ===
Years	Champions	Runners-up	Third place
1974	Umf. Biskupstungna		
1975	Vikingur Reykjavik		
1976	Vikingur Reykjavik		
1977	ÍMA		
1978	Völsungur Húsavík		
1979	Völsungur Húsavík		
1980	Vikingur Reykjavik		
1981	Vikingur Reykjavik		
1982	Íþróttafélag stúdenta (ÍS)		
1983	þróttur Reykjavík		
1984	Völsungur Húsavík		
1985	Íþróttafélag stúdenta (ÍS)		
1986	Íþróttafélag stúdenta (ÍS)		
1987	Vikingur Reykjavik		
1988	Breiðablik UBK		
1989	Vikingur Reykjavik		
1990	Íþróttafélag stúdenta (ÍS)		
1991	Vikingur Reykjavik		
1992	Íþróttafélag stúdenta (ÍS)		
1993	Vikingur Reykjavik		
1994	Íþróttafélag stúdenta (ÍS)		
1995	HK Kópavogur		
1996	Þróttur Neskaupstað		
1997	Íþróttafélag stúdenta (ÍS)		
1998	Vikingur Reykjavik		
1999	Íþróttafélag stúdenta (ÍS)		
2000	Þróttur Neskaupstað		
2001	Þróttur Neskaupstað		
2002	Þróttur Neskaupstað		
2003	Þróttur Neskaupstað		
2004	þróttur Reykjavík		
2005	þróttur Reykjavík		
2006	þróttur Reykjavík		
2007	þróttur Reykjavík		
2008	Þróttur Neskaupstað		
2009	HK Kópavogur	Þróttur Neskaupstað	þróttur Reykjavík
2010	HK Kópavogur		
2011	Þróttur Neskaupstað	HK Kópavogur	
2012	Afturelding Mosfellsbær	Þróttur Neskaupstað	
2013	Þróttur Neskaupstað		
2014	Afturelding Mosfellsbær		
2015	HK Kópavogur		
2016	Afturelding Mosfellsbær	HK Kópavogur	Þróttur Neskaupstað
2017	HK Kópavogur	Afturelding Mosfellsbær	
2018	Þróttur Neskaupstað	Afturelding Mosfellsbær	Ungmennafélagið Stjarnan
2019	Knattspyrnufélag Akureyrar	HK Kópavogur	
2020	Not Finished		
