= Arlington-Washington Futurity Stakes =

Annual horse race in the United States

Arlington-Washington Futurity
- Class: Listed
- Location: Arlington Park; Arlington Heights, Illinois, United States
- Inaugurated: 1927
- Race type: Thoroughbred – Flat racing
- Website: www.arlingtonpark.com

Race information
- Distance: One Mile
- Track: Turf, left-handed
- Qualification: Two-year-olds
- Purse: US$100,000

The Arlington-Washington Futurity is a Listed horse race for Thoroughbred two-year-olds. It is scheduled to run at a distance of one mile on the turf at Arlington Park, Arlington Heights, Illinois every fall and as at 2020 offers a purse of $100,000.

It was run as the American National Futurity in 1927 and 1928 and as the Arlington Futurity Stakes from 1932 through 1961. In 1962, the Arlington Futurity and Washington Park Futurity Stakes were merged to create the Arlington-Washington Futurity.

Raced at Washington Park Race Track from 1943 to 1945, and as a result of the 1985 fire, at Hawthorne Race Course in 1985. It was not run from 1929 through 1931 as well as 1970, 1988, 1995, 1998 and 1999.

Former Race Names:

- Arlington-Washington Futurity: 1962–2003, and 2007 to present
- Arlington-Washington Breeders' Cup Futurity: 2004–2006
  - American National Futurity: 1927–1928
  - Arlington Futurity: 1932–1961
  - Washington Park Futurity Stakes: 1937–1961

Distances:

- 1 Mile: 1984, 1986–2013, 2020 to present
- 7 Furlongs: 1962–1969, 1979–1983, 2014–2019
- 6 ½ Furlongs: 1974–1978, 1985
- 6 Furlong: 1927–1961, 1971–1973

== Winners since 1962 ==
Year	Winner	Jockey	Trainer	Owner	Distance	Time
2019	Flap Jack	Sophie Doyle	Jack Sisterson	Calumet Farm	7 Furlongs	1:24.35
2018	Big Drink of Water	Jose Valdivia Jr.	Larry Rivelli	Patricia's Hope LLC	7 Furlongs	1:25.20
2017	Barry Lee	Horacio Karamanos	Horacio DePaz	Sagamore Farm LLC & Stanley M. Hough	7 Furlongs	1:25.27
2016	Wellabled	E. T. Baird	Larry Rivelli	C. Wilson	7 Furlongs	1:24.70
2015	Shogood	Christopher A. Emigh	Scott Becker	William Stiritz	7 Furlongs	1:24.19
2014	Recount	Emmanuel Esquivel	James DiVito	Doubledown Stables, Inc.	7 Furlongs	1:24.25
2013	Solitary Ranger	Diego Sanchez	Anne P. Smith	S. Moulton	8 Furlongs	1:38.17
2012	Pataky Kid	Garrett Gomez	Thomas F. Proctor	Swifty Farms Inc.	8 Furlongs	1:37.58
2011	Shared Property	Leandro Goncalves	Tom Amoss	J. Namy	8 Furlongs	1:37.93
2010	Major Gain	Junior Alvarado	Wayne Catalano	Mary & Gary West	8 Furlongs	1:36.36
2009	Dixie Band	David Flores	Wayne Catalano	D. & E. Yates	8 Furlongs	1:39.45
2008	Terrain †	Jamie Theriot	Albert Stall Jr.	Adele Dilschneider	8 Furlongs	1:35.68
2007	Wicked Style	Robby Albarado	George R. Arnold II	Ashbrook Farm	8 Furlongs	1:36.52
2006	Officer Rocket (DH)	Mark Guidry	Robert Holthus	Frank Fletcher Racing Operations	8 Furlongs	1:36.71
2006	Got the Last Laugh (DH)	René Douglas	William Mott	Zayat Stables LLC	8 Furlongs	1:36.71
2005	Sorcerer's Stone	Mark Guidry	Patrick B. Byrne	R. Sheppard	8 Furlongs	1:35.16
2004	Three Hour Nap	Eusebio Razo Jr.	Hugh Robertson	Homewrecker Racing LCC & H. Robertson	8 Furlongs	1:38.56
2003	Cactus Ridge	Eddie Martin Jr.	W. Bret Calhoun	Dream Walkin Farms Inc.	8 Furlongs	1:35.44
2002	Most Feared	Mark Guidry	Ronny Werner	T. Durant	8 Furlongs	1:37.52
2001	Publication	Randall Meier	Terry Knight	Triple Crown Bloodstock	8 Furlongs	1:38.78
2000	Trailthefox	Shane Sellers	Patrick Biancone	J. Liebau et al.	8 Furlongs	1:37.25
1999	No Race					
1998	No Race					
1997	Cowboy Dan	Dean Kutz	Danny Hutt	D. Hutt	8 Furlongs	1:37.68
1996	Night in Reno	Mark Guidry	Larry Kelly	Blue Goose Stable	8 Furlongs	1:36.67
1995	No Race					
1994	Evansville Slew	Perry Compton	Donnie K. Von Hemel	R. L. Sanford	8 Furlongs	1:37.84
1993	Polar Expedition	Curt Bourque	Hugh Robertson	J. Cody	8 Furlongs	1:39.28
1992	Gilded Time	Chris McCarron	Darrell Vienna	D. Milch & D. & M. Silverman	8 Furlongs	1:37.84
1991	Caller I. D.	Jerry Bailey	Stanley M. Hough	Triumviri Stable	8 Furlongs	1:36.01
1990	Hansel	Pat Day	Frank Brothers	Lazy Lane Farm	8 Furlongs	1:36.40
1989	Secret Hello	Aaron Gryder	Frank Brothers	Lazy Lane Farm	8 Furlongs	1:35 4/5
1987	Tejano	Jacinto Vasquez	D. Wayne Lukas	Beal & French Jr.	8 Furlongs	1:36 1/5
1986	Bet Twice	Craig Perret	Warren A. Croll Jr.	Blanche P. Levy	8 Furlongs	1:37 1/5
1985	Meadowlake	Juvenal Diaz	J. B. Sonnier	Saron Stable	6 ½ Furlongs	1:16 4/5
1984	Spend A Buck	C. Hussey	Cam Gambolati	Hunter Farm	8 Furlongs	1:38
1983	All Fired Up	R. Evans	Timothy J. Muckler	Muckler Stable	7 Furlongs	1:27
1982	Total Departure	Earlie Fires	J. Bert Sonnier	Lyons & Templeman	7 Furlongs	1:23 3/5
1981	Let's Don't FIght	John Lively	Anthony L. Basile	Bwamazon Farm	7 Furlongs	1:29 1/5
1980	Well Decorated	Laffit Pincay Jr.	Eugene Jacobs	Herbert A. Allen Sr.	7 Furlongs	1:23 4/5
1979	Execution's Reason	Eddie Delahoussaye	J. Bert Sonnier	H. B. Noonan	7 Furlongs	1:22 2/5
1978	Jose Binn	Ángel Cordero Jr.	J. Martin	M. Binn	6 ½ Furlongs	1:17 2/5
1977	Sauce Boat	Steve Cauthen	Thomas Joseph Kelly	J. M. Smith	6 ½ Furlongs	1:16 3/5
1976	Run Dusty Run	Darrel McHargue	Smiley Adams	Golden Chance Farm (Robert & Verna Lehmann)	6 ½ Furlongs	1:16 2/5
1975	Honest Pleasure	Darrel McHargue	LeRoy Jolley	Bertram R. Firestone	6 ½ Furlongs	1:18 2/5
1974	Greek Answer	Marco Castaneda	Frank H. Merrill Jr.	W. Preston Gilbride	6 ½ Furlongs	1:17 4/5
1973	Lover John	Bobby Ussery	Thomas H. Heard Jr.	Caesar P. Kimmel	6 ½ Furlongs	1:11 3/5
1972	Shecky Greene	Carlos H. Marquez Sr.	Louis M. Goldfine	Joseph Kellman	6 Furlongs	1:10 2/5
1971‡‡	Hold Your Pece	Carlos H. Marquez Sr.	Arnold N. Winick	Maribel G. Blum	6 Furlongs	1:11
1971‡‡	Governor Max	Craig Perret	Howard M. Tesher	Serendipity Farm	6 Furlongs	1:11 1/5
1970	No Race					
1969	Silent Screen	John L. Rotz	J. Bowes Bond	Elberon Farm	7 Furlongs	1:22 3/5
1968	Strong Strong	Danny Gargan	William J. Ressequet Jr.	Steiner III & W. Ressequet Jr.	7 Furlongs	1:22 4/5
1967‡	T. V. Commercial	Pete Anderson	Anthony L. Basile	Bwamazon Farm	7 Furlongs	1:23 4/5
1967‡	Vitriolic	Bill Shoemaker	Edward A. Neloy	Ogden Phipps	7 Furlongs	1:24
1966	Diplomat Way	Bill Shoemaker	John O. Meaux	Harvey Peltier Sr.	7 Furlongs	1:22 3/5
1965	Buckpasser	Braulio Baeza	William C. Winfrey	Ogden Phipps	7 Furlongs	1:23
1964	Sadair	Bill Shoemaker	Les Lear	North Forty Stable	7 Furlongs	1:23 2/5
1963	Golden Ruler	Herberto Hinojosa	Charles R. Werstler	Mary Fisher	7 Furlongs	1:24 4/5
1962	Candy Spots	Bill Shoemaker	Mesh Tenney	Rex Ellsworth	7 Furlongs	1:21 4/5

- † In 2008, Jose Adan and Advice finished first and second, respectively, but were disqualified and set back to second and third.
- In 2006, there was a dead heat between Officer Rocket and Got the Last Laugh.
- ‡‡ In 1971 the race was run in two divisions
- ‡ In 1967 the race was run in two divisions
