= Breeders' Futurity Stakes =

- Class: Grade I
- Location: Keeneland Race Course; Lexington, Kentucky, United States
- Inaugurated: 1910
- Race type: Thoroughbred – Flat racing
- Website: ww2.keeneland.com/racing/default.aspx

Race information
- Distance: 1 1/16 miles (8.5 furlongs)
- Surface: Dirt
- Track: left-handed
- Qualification: Two-year-olds
- Weight: Fillies, 118 lbs. Colts and Geldings, 121lbs
- Purse: $650,000 (since 2025)

The Breeders' Futurity Stakes is an American Grade I Thoroughbred horse race held annually in early October at Keeneland Race Course in Lexington, Kentucky. Currently offering a purse of $650,000, the race is open to two-year-old horses and is run at a distance of one and one-sixteenth miles on the dirt. From 1997 to 2008, the race was sponsored by Lane's End Farm. From 2009 to 2013 it was sponsored by Dixiana Farm. It is now sponsored by Claiborne Farm.

== Structure ==
The race is a Road to the Kentucky Derby Prep Season qualifying race. The winner receives 10 points toward qualifying for the Kentucky Derby. It is also currently part of the Breeders' Cup Challenge series. The winner automatically qualifies for the Breeders' Cup Juvenile.

== History ==
The Breeders' Futurity was first raced at the Lexington Race Course in 1910 and was renewed each year thereafter through 1930. In 1931 through 1935, the race was shifted to the Latonia Race Track in Covington, Kentucky. The Futurity was revived at Keeneland in the fall of 1938 and during World War II, from 1943 through 1945 was renewed as part of the Churchill Downs fall meetings.

The race was a Grade III event from 1973 to 1975, a Grade II from 1976 through 2003, and became a Grade 1 stakes in 2004. Over the years, it has been raced at various distances:

- Six furlongs (1938–1949)
- Seven furlongs (1950–1955)
- Seven furlongs, 184 feet (1956–1980)
- 1 1/16 miles (1981–present)

From 2006 to 2013, the race was run on a Polytrack artificial dirt surface. In 2014, the Polytrack was replaced by a new dirt surface.

== Records (since 1938) ==
Fastest Time: (at Current Distance 1 1/16 miles)

- 1:42.20 – Polar Expedition (1993)

Most wins by an owner

- 5 – Claiborne Farm (1956, 1963, 1968, 1983, 1987)

Most wins by a jockey

- 5 – Don Brumfield (1969, 1970, 1972, 1974, 1979)

Most wins by a trainer

- 6 – D. Wayne Lukas (1991, 1992, 1995, 1996, 1998, 2004)
- 6 – Todd A. Pletcher (2013, 2014, 2022, 2023, 2025, 2026)

== Winners of the Breeders' Futurity Stakes since 1938 ==
Year	Winner	Jockey	Trainer	Owner	Time
2026	American History	John R. Velazquez	Todd A. Pletcher	Winstar Farm, First Go Racing & CHC	1:44.88
2025	Ted Noffey	John R. Velazquez	Todd A. Pletcher	Spendthrift Farm	1:43.98
2024	East Avenue	Tyler Gaffalione	Brendan P. Walsh	Godolphin	1:43.17
2023	Locked	José Ortiz	Todd A. Pletcher	Eclipse Thoroughbred Partners and Walmac Farm	1:45.06
2022	Forte	Irad Ortiz Jr.	Todd A. Pletcher	Repole Stable & St. Elias Stable	1:44.74
2021	Rattle N Roll	Brian Hernandez Jr.	Kenneth McPeek	Lucky Seven Stable	1:43.78
2020	Essential Quality	Luis Saez	Brad H. Cox	Godolphin	1:44.37
2019	Maxfield	José Ortiz	Brendan Walsh	Godolphin	1:44.21
2018	Knicks Go	Albin Jimenez	Ben Colebrook	KRA Stud Farm	1:44.23
2017	Free Drop Billy	Robby Albarado	Dale L. Romans	Albaugh Family Stables	1:45.43
2016	Classic Empire	Julien Leparoux	Mark E. Casse	John C. Oxley	1:43.41
2015	Brody's Cause	Corey J. Lanerie	Dale L. Romans	Albaugh Family Stable	1:43.27
2014	Carpe Diem	John R. Velazquez	Todd A. Pletcher	WinStar Farm & Stonestreet Stables	1:43.38
2013	We Miss Artie	John R. Velazquez	Todd A. Pletcher	Ken and Sarah Ramsey	1:46.91
2012	Joha	Rajiv Maragh	Michael J. Maker	Bluegrass Equine Bloodstock	1:44.52
2011	Dullahan	Kent Desormeaux	Dale L. Romans	Donegal Racing (Jerry Crawford, partnership manager)	1:43.12
2010	J.B.'s Thunder	Shaun Bridgmohan	Albert Stall Jr.	Columbine Stable	1:44.12
2009	Noble's Promise	Willie Martinez	Kenneth G. McPeek	Chasing Dreams Racing	1:43.12
2008	Square Eddie	Rafael Bejarano	John R. Best	J. Paul Reddam	1:43.04
2007	Wicked Style	Robby Albarado	George R. Arnold II	Ashbrook Farm	1:45.21
2006	Great Hunter	Victor Espinoza	Doug O'Neill	J. Paul Reddam	1:44.09
2005	Dawn of War	John Jacinto	Dale L. Romans	Ken and Sarah Ramsey	1:48.77
2004	Consolidator	Rafael Bejarano	D. Wayne Lukas	R. & B. Lewis	1:43.67
2003	Eurosilver	Javier Castellano	Nicholas P. Zito	Buckram Oak Farm	1:43.42
2002	Sky Mesa	Edgar Prado	John T. Ward Jr.	John C. Oxley	1:46.78
2001	Siphonic	Chris McCarron	David Hofmans	Amerman Racing LLC	1:43.79
2000	Arabian Light	Shane Sellers	Bob Baffert	The Thoroughbred Corp.	1:43.00
1999	Captain Steve	Garrett K. Gomez	Bob Baffert	Michael E. Pegram	1:42.40
1998	Cat Thief	Pat Day	D. Wayne Lukas	Overbrook Farm	1:44.00
1997	Favorite Trick	Pat Day	Patrick B. Byrne	Joseph LaCombe Stable	1:43.20
1996	Boston Harbor	Jerry D. Bailey	D. Wayne Lukas	Overbrook Farm	1:45.20
1995	Honour and Glory	Pat Day	D. Wayne Lukas	Michael Tabor	1:43.20
1994	Tejano Run	Jerry D. Bailey	Kenneth McPeek	Roy K. Monroe	1:44.60
1993	Polar Expedition	Curt Bourque	Hugh H. Robertson	James B. Cody	1:42.20
1992	Mountain Cat	Pat Day	D. Wayne Lukas	Overbrook Farm	1:42.40
1991	Dance Floor	Charles Woods Jr.	D. Wayne Lukas	Oaktown Stable	1:44.20
1990	Sir Bordeaux	Wigberto Ramos	Ronnie G. Warren	Donald G. Hardamon & Ray Trisler	1:44.40
1989	Slavic	José A. Santos	Flint S. Schulhofer	William Haggin Perry	1:44.60
1988	Fast Play	Ángel Cordero Jr.	C. R. McGaughey III	Ogden Phipps	1:45.20
1987	Forty Niner	Eddie Maple	Woody Stephens	Claiborne Farm	1:43.80
1986	Orono	Sandy Hawley	Carl Nafzger	Bayview Stable	1:45.20
1985	Tasso	Laffit Pincay Jr.	Neil Drysdale	Gerald Robins & Tim Sams	1:46.00
1984	Crater Fire	Daryl Montoya	Dixie H. Griffitt	Samuel D. Hinkle IV & D. D. Crater	1:45.80
1983	Swale	Eddie Maple	Woody Stephens	Claiborne Farm	1:44.00
1982	Highland Park	John L. Lively	Anthony L. Basile	Bwamazon Farm	1:43.60
1981	D'Accord	Darrel McHargue	LeRoy Jolley	Bertram R. Firestone	1:44.80
1980	Fairway Phantom	John L. Lively	Carl Nafzger	William Floyd	1:28.80
1979	Gold Stage	Don Brumfield	William Curtis Jr.	Georgia E. Hofmann	1:26.80
1978	Strike Your Colors	Ed Delahoussaye	Del W. Carroll	William S. Farish III	1:26.20
1977	Gonquin	Frank Olivares	Jerry M. Fanning	James Scully	1:28.00
1976	Run Dusty Run	Darrel McHargue	Smiley Adams	Golden Chance Farm	1:27.40
1975	Harbor Springs	Eddie Maple	Woody Stephens	Louis Lee Haggin II	1:27.00
1974	Packer Captain	Don Brumfield	Douglas Dodson	Eagle Mountain Farm	1:25.80
1973	Provante	Mike Manganello	Dave Zakoor Jr.	Greg E. Sanders	1:27.20
1972	Annihilate 'Em	Don Brumfield	Douglas M. Davis Jr.	Patricia B. Blass	1:27.00
1971	Windjammer	Laffit Pincay Jr.	MacKenzie Miller	Cragwood Stables	1:27.20
1970	Man of the Moment	Don Brumfield	Jack Long	Circle M Farm	1:28.80
1969	Hard Work	Don Brumfield	Charles R. Werstler	Dixiana Stable	1:25.60
1968	Dike	Earlie Fires	Lucien Laurin	Claiborne Farm	1:26.80
1967	T.V. Commercial	Manuel Ycaza	Anthony L. Basile	Bwamazon Farm	1:26.80
1966	Gentleman James	Jimmy Nichols	Del W. Carroll	Michael Grace Phipps	1:28.00
1965	Tinsley	Jimmy Nichols	Julius E. Tinsley Jr.	Fred W. Hooper	1:28.40
1964	Umbrella Fella	John Nazareth	Loyd Gentry Jr.	Ford Stables	1:26.40
1963	Duel	William D. Lucas	LeRoy Jolley	Claiborne Farm	1:26.20
1962	Ornamento	Jimmy Lynch	James P. Conway	Darby Dan Farm	1:26.40
1961	Roman Line	William M. Cook	Vester R. Wright	T. Allie Grissom	1:26.60
1960	He's a Pistol	Larney Hansman	Joseph D. Puckett	J. Graham Brown	1:27.00
1959	Toby's Brother	John L. Rotz	Robert E. Wingfield	G. Van Deren & O.S. Deming	1:27.20
1958	Namon	Jimmy Combest	Vester R. Wright	T. Allie Grissom	1:26.80
1957	Fulcrum	John Delahoussaye	Jack C. Hodgins	Mary V. Fisher	1:26.40
1956	Round Table	Steve Brooks	Moody Jolley	Claiborne Farm	1:26.80
1955	Jovial Jove	Douglas Dodson	Strother Griffin	Bwamazon Farm	1:23.60
1954	Brother Tex	Pete D. Anderson	Woody Stephens	Woody Stephens	1:24.40
1953	Hasty Road	John H. Adams	Harry Trotsek	Hasty House Farm	1:23.20
1952	Straight Face	Bennie Green	John M. Gaver Sr.	Greentree Stable	1:23.80
1951	Alladier	Carroll Bierman	Anthony J. Pupino	Harborvale Stable, F.L. Leatherbury & E.A. Roberts	1:23.40
1950	Big Stretch	Ted Atkinson	John M. Gaver Sr.	Greentree Stable	1:23.60
1949	Oil Capitol	Kenneth Church	Harry Trotsek	Thomas Gray	1:12.20
1948	Olympia	Willie Garner	Ivan H. Parke	Fred W. Hooper	1:11.60
1947	Shy Guy	Steve Brooks	Jack C. Hodgins	Dixiana Stable	1:11.80
1946	Education	Steve Brooks	Ivan H. Parke	Fred W. Hooper	1:11.40
1945	Pellicle	Steve Brooks	E. Leigh Cotton	Hal Price Headley	1:12.80
1944	Air Sailor	Leon Haas	Lex Wilson	Theodore DeLong Buhl	1:12.20
1943	Durazna	Jesse Higley	John M. Goode	Brownell Combs	1:11.60
1942	Occupation	Leon Haas	Burley Parke	John Marsch	1:14.00
1941	Devil Diver	Conn McCreary	John M. Gaver Sr.	Greentree Stable	1:11.80
1940	Whirlaway	Johnny Longden	Ben A. Jones	Calumet Farm	1:11.20
1939	Roman Flag	Leon Haas	Max Hirsch	W. Arnold Hanger	1:10.60
1938	Johnstown	James Stout	George Tappen	Belair Stud	1:11.40

== Earlier winners ==
- 1937: No race
- 1936: No race
- 1935: No race
- 1934: No race
- 1933: Mata Hari
- 1932: Technique
- 1931: The Bull
- 1930: Mate
- 1929: Gallant Knight
- 1928: Current
- 1927: Wacker Drive
- 1926: Wood Lore
- 1925: Flight of Time
- 1924: Candy Kid
- 1923: Worthmore
- 1922: Donges
- 1921: Gentility
- 1920: Believe Idle Hour
- 1919: Blazes
- 1918: Colonel Livingston
- 1917: Escoba
- 1916: Harry Kelly
- 1915: Kinney
- 1914: Luke
- 1913: Imperator
- 1912: Helios
- 1911: The Manager
- 1910: Housemaid

== See also ==
- Road to the Kentucky Derby
