= Annihilate 'Em =

American-bred Thoroughbred racehorse

Annihilate 'em
- Sire: Hempen
- Grandsire: Indian Hemp
- Dam: Spots To Spare
- Damsire: Star Rover
- Sex: Colt
- Foaled: 1970
- Country: United States
- Colour: Chestnut
- Breeder: Douglas M. Davis, Jr.
- Owner: Patricia B. Blass
- Trainer: Douglas M. Davis, Jr.
- Record: 18-11-4-2
- Earnings: US$$237,111

Major wins
- Breeders' Futurity Stakes (1972); River Downs Juvenile Stakes; Travers Stakes (1973); Minuteman Handicap (1973); Sentinel Stakes (1973)

Annihilate 'em (April 11, 1970 – November 20, 1989) was a U.S. thoroughbred race horse who was best known for winning the 1973 Travers Stakes at Saratoga Race Course in Saratoga Springs, New York. Annihilate 'em was ridden to victory in the Travers by Ron Turcotte, who originally planned to ride Triple Crown winner Secretariat in the race. However, Secretariat missed the race due to poor health after losing the Whitney Stakes to Onion two weeks earlier while running with a low-grade fever. Annihilate 'Em and Secretariat met in their only race together in the Marlboro Cup Invitational Handicap in September 1973, where Secretariat finished first and Annihilate 'Em finished fifth.

Annihilate 'Em's other stakes victories included the 1972 Breeders' Futurity, the 1973 Minuteman Handicap and the 1973 Sentinel Stakes.

Retired to stud, Annihilate 'em stood his entire career at High Hope Farm in Versailles, Kentucky.

== Pedigree ==
Pedigree of Annihilate 'Em
Sire Hempen 1962	Indian Hemp 1949	Nasrullah	Nearco
Sire Hempen 1962	Indian Hemp 1949	Nasrullah	Mumtaz Begum
Sire Hempen 1962	Indian Hemp 1949	Sabzy	Stardust
Sire Hempen 1962	Indian Hemp 1949	Sabzy	Sarita
Sire Hempen 1962	Serry 1952	Spy Song	Balladier
Sire Hempen 1962	Serry 1952	Spy Song	Mata Hari
Sire Hempen 1962	Serry 1952	Santa Roseanna	Rosemont
Sire Hempen 1962	Serry 1952	Santa Roseanna	Sandury
Dam Spots to Spare 1962	Star Rover 1952	Flushing	Mahmoud
Dam Spots to Spare 1962	Star Rover 1952	Flushing	Callandar
Dam Spots to Spare 1962	Star Rover 1952	Miss Moonbeam	Pharamond
Dam Spots to Spare 1962	Star Rover 1952	Miss Moonbeam	Witches Night
Dam Spots to Spare 1962	Fast Cat 1954	Tiger	Bull Dog
Dam Spots to Spare 1962	Fast Cat 1954	Tiger	Starless Moment
Dam Spots to Spare 1962	Fast Cat 1954	Head Smart	Head Play
Dam Spots to Spare 1962	Fast Cat 1954	Head Smart	Six Sixty
