= Run Dusty Run =

American thoroughbred racehorse

- Breed: Thoroughbred
- Sire: Dust Commander
- Grandsire: Bold Commander
- Dam: Running Beauty
- Damsire: Double Jay
- Sex: Stallion
- Foaled: April 19, 1974
- Country: USA
- Breeder: Golden Chance Farm, Inc. (Robert E. Lehmann)
- Owner: Verna M. Lehmann
- Trainer: William E. "Smiley" Adams
- Record: 24:10-10-1
- Earnings: $608,538

Major wins
- Arch Ward Stakes (1976); Arlington-Washington Futurity Stakes (1976); Breeders' Futurity Stakes (1976); Kentucky Jockey Club Stakes (1976); Louisiana Derby Trial Stakes (1977); Hialeah Challenge Cup Invitational Stakes (1978); Seminole Handicap (1978)

Run Dusty Run (foaled April 19, 1974) is an American Thoroughbred racehorse, winner of the 1976 Arlington-Washington Futurity Stakes.

== Career ==
Run Dusty Run began his racing career on April 6, 1976, placing 4th at Keeneland.

As a two-year-old he picked up two wins in Arlington in September and October 1976 before winning the Grade 1 Arlington-Washington Futurity Stakes, the first major win of his career. On October 9, 1976, he won the Grade 2 Breeders' Futurity Stakes, then finished the year with a win in the Kentucky Jockey Club Stakes.

Run Dusty Run's three-year-old campaign was a tough one. He finished second six times. In Seattle Slew's 1977 U.S. Triple Crown year, Run Dusty Run finished second in the 1977 Kentucky Derby, third in the 1977 Preakness Stakes and second in the 1977 Belmont Stakes. In the 1977 Travers, Run Dusty Run crossed the finish line first, but was disqualified and placed second to Jatski.

1978 was Dusty's last racing year and he finished his career with wins at the Hialeah Challenge Cup Invitational Stakes and the Grade 2 Seminole Stakes.

== Pedigree ==
Pedigree of Run Dusty Run (USA),1974
Sire Dust Commander 1967	Bold Commander (USA); 1960	Bold Ruler	Nasrullah
Sire Dust Commander 1967	Bold Commander (USA); 1960	Bold Ruler	Miss Disco
Sire Dust Commander 1967	Bold Commander (USA); 1960	High Voltage	Ambiorix
Sire Dust Commander 1967	Bold Commander (USA); 1960	High Voltage	Dynamo
Sire Dust Commander 1967	Dust Storm (USA); 1956	Windy City	Wyndham
Sire Dust Commander 1967	Dust Storm (USA); 1956	Windy City	Staunton
Sire Dust Commander 1967	Dust Storm (USA); 1956	Challure	Challedon
Sire Dust Commander 1967	Dust Storm (USA); 1956	Challure	Captivation
Dam Running Beauty (USA) 1967	Double Jay (USA); 1944	Balladier	Black Toney
Dam Running Beauty (USA) 1967	Double Jay (USA); 1944	Balladier	Blue Warbler
Dam Running Beauty (USA) 1967	Double Jay (USA); 1944	Broomshot	Whisk Broom II
Dam Running Beauty (USA) 1967	Double Jay (USA); 1944	Broomshot	Centre Shot
Dam Running Beauty (USA) 1967	Mr. Dream (ARG); 1960	Tatan	The Yuvaraj
Dam Running Beauty (USA) 1967	Mr. Dream (ARG); 1960	Tatan	Valkyrie
Dam Running Beauty (USA) 1967	Mr. Dream (ARG); 1960	My Devotion	Gusty
Dam Running Beauty (USA) 1967	Mr. Dream (ARG); 1960	My Devotion	Maltima
