= Darrel McHargue =

American jockey

Personal information
- Born: September 26, 1954 (age 71) Oklahoma City, Oklahoma; United States
- Occupation: Jockey

Horse racing career
- Sport: Horse racing
- Career wins: 2,553 (North America)

Major racing wins
- Arkansas Derby (1974); Arlington-Washington Lassie Stakes (1974); Cotillion Handicap (1974); Hollywood Lassie Stakes (1974, 1978, 1981); Alcibiades Stakes (1975); Arlington-Washington Futurity Stakes (1975, 1976); Blue Grass Stakes (1975); Del Mar Debutante Stakes (1975, 1978); Lexington Stakes (1975, 1976); Apple Blossom Handicap (1976); Coolmore Lexington Stakes (1976); Del Mar Derby (1976, 1977); Breeders' Futurity Stakes (1976, 1981); Del Mar Handicap (1977); Ramona Handicap (1977, 1978); Las Flores Handicap (1977, 1978, 1979); Oak Leaf Stakes (1977, 1981); San Juan Capistrano Handicap (1977, 1980); Santa Margarita Invitational Handicap (1977); San Vicente Stakes (1977); Hopeful Stakes (1978); San Antonio Handicap (1978); San Marcos Stakes (1978, 1980); San Pasqual Handicap (1978); Santa Monica Handicap (1978); Santa Anita Handicap (1978); Saratoga Special Stakes (1978); Yerba Buena Handicap (1978); Longacres Mile Handicap (1979); San Carlos Handicap (1979); San Simeon Handicap (1979); San Fernando Stakes (1979); Hollywood Invitational Turf Handicap (1980); La Brea Stakes (1980); San Gabriel Handicap (1980); San Luis Rey Handicap (1980); San Marcos Stakes (1980); Tremont Stakes (1980); Baldwin Stakes (1981, 1986); Del Mar Oaks (1981); Santa Anita Derby (1981); El Camino Real Derby (1982); Santa Catalina Stakes (1982); Hollywood Derby (1984); King's Bishop Stakes (1985); Bay Shore Stakes (1986); Turf Paradise Derby (1988) American Classic Race wins: Preakness Stakes (1975) In Europe: Dee Stakes (1984); March Stakes (1984); Irish St. Leger (1984); Sun Chariot Stakes (1984); Jockey Club Cup (1984)

Racing awards
- United States Champion Jockey by earnings (1978); Eclipse Award for Outstanding Jockey (1978); George Woolf Memorial Jockey Award (1978)

Significant horses
- Ancient Title, Commanche Run, General Assembly, Honest Pleasure, John Henry, Master Derby, Run Dusty Run, Terlingua, Vigors,
- Updated on September 12, 2020

Darrel G. McHargue (born September 26, 1954, in Oklahoma City, Oklahoma) is a retired American Champion jockey in Thoroughbred horse racing. One of five children from a family not connected to horse racing, he was first introduced to riding as a teenage boy when he rode a neighbor's Quarter Horse. He was 17 years old when he made his professional debut in 1972 at Churchill Downs in Louisville, Kentucky. The following year he was the leading rider at Laurel Park Racecourse in Laurel, Maryland.

== Triple Crown races ==
Darrel McHargue competed in eight Kentucky Derbys between 1974 and 1986. His best finishes were a second with Run Dusty Run in 1977 and a third with actor Jack Klugman's colt Jaklin Klugman in 1980.

In 1975, the twenty-year-old McHargue earned the most important win of his career when he rode Master Derby to victory in the Preakness Stakes, the second leg of the U.S. Triple Crown series.

McHargue had two mounts in the Belmont Stakes, finishing third with Master Derby in 1975 and second with McKenzie Bridge in 1976.

== 1978 Championship ==
McHargue was the leading jockey at the 1977 Oak Tree Racing Association fall meet. The next year would be the best of his career. He rode six winners in one day at Santa Anita Park on March 5, 1978, and again on October 25, 1979. In 1978, he was the leading money-winning jockey in the United States with a record $6,188,353 and was voted the Eclipse Award as the United States' Outstanding Jockey. In addition, he was voted the 1978 George Woolf Memorial Jockey Award presented by Santa Anita Park to the jockey in North America who demonstrates high standards of personal and professional conduct, on and off the racetrack.

Beginning in 1980, McHargue rode the great John Henry in eleven of his starts, winning such races as the San Juan Capistrano Handicap, Hollywood Invitational Turf Handicap, San Gabriel Handicap, San Luis Rey Handicap, and San Marcos Stakes.

== European racing ==
A proven rider on turf, in 1983 McHargue moved to a base in Ireland, where he rode for various trainers including Luca Cumani and Dermot Weld and for owners such as the American husband and wife team of Bertram and Diana Firestone and Englishman Ivan Allan. In 1984, he was the stable jockey for Cumani and had ridden Allan's outstanding colt Commanche Run in most of his races . Commanche Run had, however, put up a vastly improved performance in the Gordon Stakes under Lester Piggott when McHargue was suspended . McHargue was scheduled to ride Commanche Run in the St. Leger Stakes. However, Piggott replaced McHargue shortly before the race at the instigation of Ivan Allan Commanche Run won the British Classic by a neck in a very close finish under a superb ride from Piggott. McHargue soon returned home to Pasadena, California.

McHargue retired from riding in early April 1988 and began a new career a few weeks later as a racing official. In 1994, he graduated from the Racing Officials Accreditation Program (ROAP). He worked at northern California tracks and in 2005 was appointed a race steward at Hollywood Park.

McHargue is married to Robin McHargue, daughter of the late trainer Robert Wingfield.
