= Jean Cruguet =

US Triple Crown of Thoroughbred Racing winning jockey

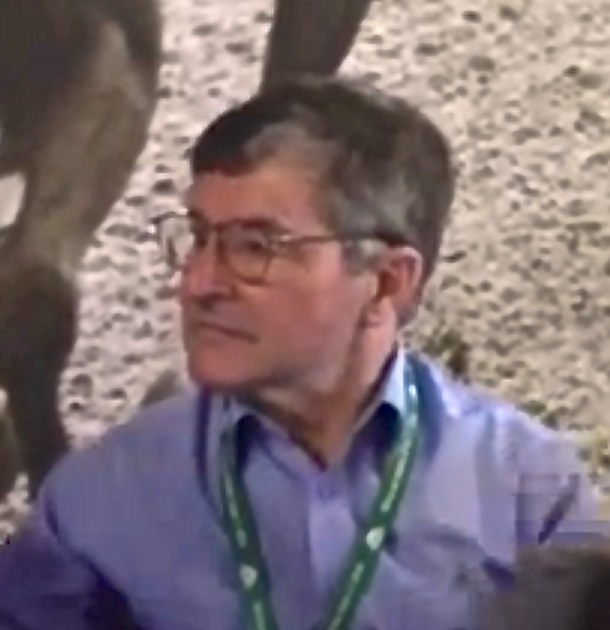
- Jean Cruguet at the 2014 Belmont Stakes

Personal information
- Born: March 8, 1939 (age 87) Agen, Lot-et-Garonne, France
- Occupation: Jockey

Horse racing career
- Sport: Horse racing
- Career wins: 2,407

Major racing wins
- United States Triple Crown (1977); Travers Stakes (1968); Lawrence Realization Stakes (1969, 1970, 1975, 1978); Metropolitan Handicap (1969); Toboggan Handicap (1969); Cowdin Stakes (1970); Laurel Futurity (1970); Lexington Handicap (1970, 1978, 1983); Manhattan Handicap (1974); Stuyvesant Handicap (1974); Alabama Stakes (1975, 1983); Hopeful Stakes (1975, 1976); Champagne Stakes (1976); Fashion Stakes (1976); Great American Stakes (1976); Mother Goose Stakes (1976, 1977); Flamingo Stakes (1977); Wood Memorial Stakes (1977, 1984); Astoria Stakes (1978); Belmont Futurity Stakes (1978); Black Helen Handicap (1978, 1989); Washington, D.C. International Stakes (1978, 1993); Jerome Handicap (1979); Ladies Handicap (1979); Saranac Handicap (1979); Withers Stakes (1979); Blue Grass Stakes (1983); Tremont Stakes (1983); Coaching Club American Oaks (1984); Dwyer Stakes (1984); Knickerbocker Handicap (1985, 1986, 1988, 1992); Matron Stakes (1986); Violet Handicap (1987) U.S. Triple Crown series: Kentucky Derby (1977); Preakness Stakes (1977); Belmont Stakes (1977) International race wins: Prix Vermeille (1972); Poule d'Essai des Pouliches (1972); Champion Stakes (1973); Canadian International Stakes (1978, 1989)

Significant horses
- Arts and Letters, Hoist The Flag, San San, Bold Reason, Seattle Slew, Mac Diarmida, Tappiano
- Updated on March 28, 2007

Jean Cruguet (born March 8, 1939, in Agen, Lot-et-Garonne, France) is a retired French-American thoroughbred horse racing jockey who won the United States Triple Crown of Thoroughbred Racing.

At age five, Cruguet was placed in an orphanage after his father abandoned the family and his mother was unable to cope. From age ten to sixteen, he lived at a secondary school run by Roman Catholic priests where he says he was physically abused. At age sixteen, a friend of his grandfather offered the diminutive Cruguet work at a Thoroughbred race track. His fledgling career as a jockey was interrupted by mandatory military service and he served in the French Army during the Algerian War.

After being discharged from the army, Cruguet returned to thoroughbred flat racing. He replaced army-bound jockey Yves Saint-Martin at the stable run by trainer François Mathet. Once Saint-Martin was discharged from the army, Cruguet had to find new rides but met with only limited success. After meeting his future wife Denyse, a trainer and one of the pioneering woman in French racing, in 1965, they decided to emigrate to the United States. In Florida, Cruguet was hired to ride for Horatio Luro at Hialeah Park Race Track and began to achieve success in the ensuing years. In 1969, he won a major Grade I race aboard Arts and Letters when he replaced Braulio Baeza due to another commitment, riding the future Hall of Fame colt to victory in the Metropolitan Handicap at Belmont Park.

In 2004, Jean Cruguet said Hoist The Flag was the best horse he ever rode. The 1970 U.S. Champion two-year-old colt, ridden by Cruguet in all his starts, went undefeated in his short career but in his three-year-old season was injured in March 1971 while preparing for the Wood Memorial Stakes. The career-ending injury denied the colt a chance to try for the Triple Crown.

Cruguet and his wife returned to race in Europe for the 1972 season, where he won Group One races such as the Prix Vermeille and Poule d'Essai des Pouliches in France, and the Champion Stakes in England. He rode the Champion San San in all her wins for trainer Angel Penna Sr. but missed being aboard the filly for her win in the Prix de l'Arc de Triomphe when he was sidelined by injury as a result of a racing accident. After finishing second in France's jockey standings for 1972, Cruguet and his wife returned to the United States.

In 1976, Cruguet rode the two-year-old colt Seattle Slew to victory in the Champagne Stakes. The following year, he and Seattle Slew won the Wood Memorial Stakes and the Flamingo Stakes en route to winning the Kentucky Derby, Preakness Stakes, and the Belmont Stakes, thereby capturing American racing's Triple Crown. In a move still written about today, with 20 yards to go to the finish line in the Belmont Stakes, Cruguet stood up in the stirrups, raised his right arm over his head, and jubilantly gave the crowd a victory salute by waving his whip in the air.

In 1978, Cruguet was the regular jockey aboard Mac Diarmida, whose wins included the two most important North American turf races with European competitors: the Canadian International Championship at Woodbine Racetrack in Toronto, Ontario, Canada and the Washington, D.C. International at Laurel Park Racecourse in Laurel, Maryland. Mac Diarmida was voted the 1978 Eclipse Award for American Champion Male Turf Horse.

Jean Cruguet retired from riding at age 41 in July 1980 to join his wife as a full-time trainer in their own small stable, but he returned to riding two years later. His last major Grade I Stakes victory came aboard Hodges Bay in the 1989 Canadian International Stakes at Woodbine Racetrack. Retired and now living near Versailles, Kentucky, Cruguet made guest appearances for many years in support of organizations such as Old Friends Equine, a retirement and rescue facility for pensioned Thoroughbreds in Midway, Kentucky. For a time, he almost completely disappeared from the public eye because he was the sole caregiver for his wife Denyse, who was bedridden after suffering a debilitating stroke in 2003. She died at their home in Kentucky in September 2010.

Cruguet planned a one-race comeback at the Keeneland Racecourse Spring Meet in April 2011 at age 72. Slated to ride a three-year-old filly trained by friend John Paul Pucek, he postponed his comeback attempt due to bad weather and concerns over the youth of the horse. He also planned to attempt a comeback during the 2011 Arlington Park meet as part of a special "Legends" race in support of the Permanently Disabled Jockeys Fund on August 12, but also had to withdraw from that event citing health concerns.

== Notes and references ==
- Lexington Herald-Leader article by Maryjean Wall on Jean Cruguet
