= Seattle Slew =

American-bred Thoroughbred racehorse

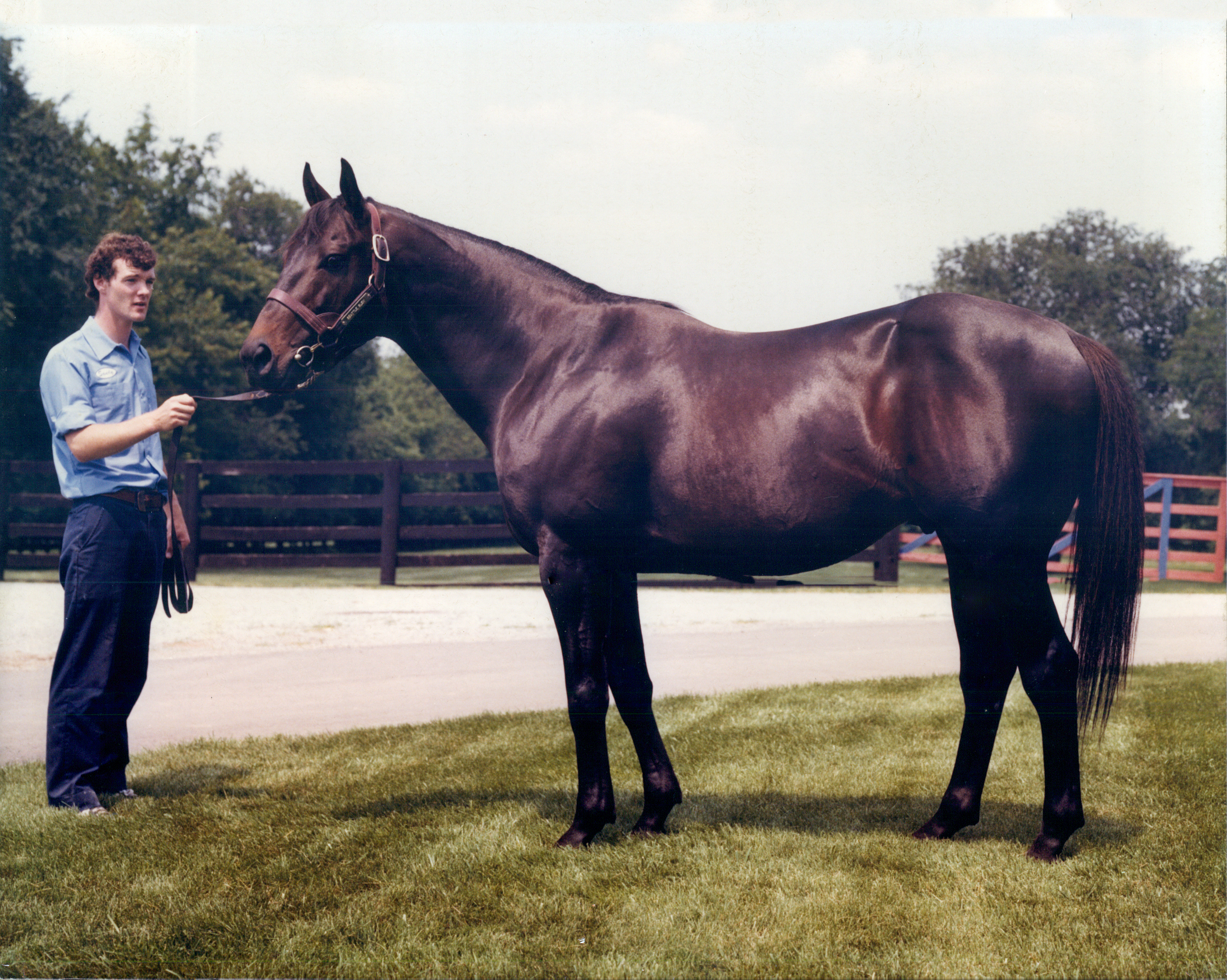
- Seattle Slew at Spendthrift Farm in 1981
- Sire: Bold Reasoning (US)
- Grandsire: Boldnesian (US)
- Dam: My Charmer (US)
- Damsire: Poker (US)
- Sex: Stallion
- Foaled: February 15, 1974; Lexington, Kentucky, U.S.
- Died: May 7, 2002 (aged 28); Lexington, Kentucky, U.S.
- Country: United States
- Color: Dark bay or brown
- Breeder: Ben S. Castleman
- Owner: Mickey and Karen L. Taylor, Tayhill Stable/Jim Hill, et al. Glenn Rasmussen
- Racing colors
- Trainer: William H. Turner Jr. Douglas R. Peterson
- Record: 17: 14–2–0
- Earnings: $1,208,726

Major wins
- Champagne Stakes (1976); Flamingo Stakes (1977); Wood Memorial Stakes (1977); Marlboro Cup (1978); Woodward Stakes(1978); Stuyvesant Handicap(1978) Triple Crown race wins: Kentucky Derby (1977); Preakness Stakes (1977); Belmont Stakes (1977)

Awards
- 10th U.S. Triple Crown Champion (1977); U.S. Champion 2-Yr-Old Colt (1976); U.S. Champion 3-Yr-Old Colt (1977); American Horse of the Year (1977); U.S. Champion Older Male Horse (1978); Leading sire in North America (1984); North American leading broodmare sire (1995, 1996) #9 - Top 100 U.S. Racehorses of the 20th Century; NTRA "Moment of the Year" (2002)

Honours
- United States Racing Hall of Fame inductee (1981)

Seattle Slew (February 15, 1974 – May 7, 2002) was a champion American Thoroughbred racehorse who became the tenth winner of the American Triple Crown (1977). He was the only horse to have won the Triple Crown while being undefeated in any previous race. In 2018, Justify became the second horse to accomplish this feat. Seattle Slew was the 1977 Horse of the Year and a champion at ages two, three, and four. In the Blood-Horse magazine List of the Top 100 U.S. Racehorses of the 20th Century Seattle Slew was ranked ninth.

Joe Hirsch of the Daily Racing Form wrote of Seattle Slew's three-year-old campaign: "Every time he ran he was an odds-on favorite, and the response to his presence on the racetrack, either for a morning workout or a major race, was electric. 'Slewmania' was a virulent and widespread condition."

Seattle Slew later became an outstanding sire and broodmare sire, leading the North American sire list in 1984 when his son Swale won the Kentucky Derby and Belmont Stakes. Another son, A.P. Indy, won the Belmont Stakes and continued the sire line through descendants such as Mineshaft, Tapit, and California Chrome. He is a maternal great-great-grandsire of 2026 Kentucky Derby winner Golden Tempo.

== Background ==
Seattle Slew was a dark bay horse with a small white patch of hair by his left rear hoof. He was bred by Ben S. Castleman, a Kentucky racing commissioner, and was foaled at White Horse Acres near Lexington, Kentucky. Seattle Slew was the first foal out of My Charmer, a stakes-winning daughter of the otherwise obscure sire Poker. My Charmer went on to produce the 2000 Guineas winner Lomond and Seattle Dancer, and several of her daughters became outstanding producers. My Charmer descends from champion and noted "blue hen" Myrtlewood. Castleman originally intended to breed My Charmer to Jacinto but that stallion's book was full so Seth Hancock of Claiborne Farm recommended the mare be bred instead to Bold Reasoning, a first-crop sire who had won the Jersey Derby and Withers Stakes in 1971. Bold Reasoning was a grandson of Bold Ruler, whose descendants, including Secretariat, dominated the Kentucky Derby in the 1970s.

Seattle Slew was not considered particularly attractive as a foal, leading some to say he looked like a mule. He was so awkward that his first nickname was Baby Huey. As he matured though, he developed a graceful front-running style with an acceleration that was compared to "a falcon in a dive". At maturity, he stood 16^{1}/_{2} hands (64.5 inches, 164 cm) high at the withers with strong hind legs and a powerful shoulder. However, his right forefoot was noticeably turned out.

Seattle Slew was purchased for just $17,500 (equivalent to $105,000 in 2025) at the 1975 Fasig-Tipton yearling auction. His new owners, later known as "the Slew Crew", were Karen and Mickey Taylor and Jim and Sally Hill. Horse owners since the early 1970s, Karen Taylor was a former flight attendant, and her husband, Mickey Taylor, was a lumberman. They lived in White Swan, Washington. Jim Hill, a veterinarian, picked out Seattle Slew at the sale, though the original budget was only $12,000. Karen Taylor, liking the look of the colt, urged her husband to go higher. They named the colt for the city of Seattle and the sloughs which loggers once used to transport heavy logs. Karen felt that the pronunciation of slough — a slow-moving channel of the Pacific Northwest — would be too hard for people to remember, so the spelling was changed to Slew. A later co-owner was Glenn Rasmussen, the accountant for the equine partnerships.

Seattle Slew's owners sent the colt to Billy Turner, a friend and former steeplechase rider who had trained horses seasonally in Maryland since the early 1960s. Based at Belmont Park in the mid-1970s, Turner accepted Seattle Slew and another Taylor-Hill purchase and sent them to Andor Farm in Monkton, where his wife at the time, Paula, taught yearlings to be ridden.

Seattle Slew was described as "intelligent, dominant and determined". "He was very easygoing," Turner said. "He liked people but he wasn't lovey dovey. He didn't like people petting him. He was the boss hoss. He would stand back and just look at you. He would let you do whatever you wanted him to do, but only if he wanted to do it."

== Racing career ==
=== 1976: two-year-old season ===
Seattle Slew's debut was delayed by his initial awkwardness, but he started to attract attention over the course of the summer at Saratoga with some fast workouts. Taylor later recalled that the colt had been timed in a brilliant time of 33 3/5 seconds for three-eighths of a mile, but the clocker instead recorded the time as 36 seconds because he felt people wouldn't believe the right figure. Slew was set to make his first start at the end of August but injured himself in his stall. He finally made his first start in a six-furlong maiden race on September 20, 1976, the fifth race at Belmont Park. The big, nearly black colt was bet down to the 5:2 favorite. He gave the public its first look at what was later called his "war dance" (his habit of tiptoeing on the track before his races) and won by five lengths. He followed up in seven-furlong allowance race on October 5, 1976, winning by 3 1/2 lengths.

On October 16, Taylor stepped the colt up in class to enter the Grade I Champagne Stakes, then the most important race for two-year-olds in the United States. His biggest rival was For the Moment, who had won four straight races including the Belmont Futurity and was a full-brother to champion Honest Pleasure. Nonetheless, Seattle Slew went off as the almost even-money favorite. Jockey Jean Cruguet sent him straight to the lead and opened up a lead down the backstretch. None of the other riders chose to challenge him, perhaps believing the colt would tire down the stretch. Instead Seattle Slew continued to draw away, eventually winning by 9 3/4 lengths in a time of 1:34 2/5 for one mile, then a stakes record.

Despite starting just three times, Seattle Slew was named Champion Two-Year-Old of 1976.

=== 1977: three-year-old season ===
Turner scheduled three races for Seattle Slew leading up to the Kentucky Derby, which was then considered to be a light campaign. Turner felt that the main threat to Seattle Slew was his health, because the horse ran so fast and hard every time. Hill later said that Turner used the prep races as workouts and did as little as possible in between. Turner scheduled only 19 breezes for Seattle Slew before and during his Triple Crown campaign, instead trying to get the colt to relax.

Seattle Slew's first start came as a three-year-old in an allowance race on March 9, 1977, at Hialeah Park Race Track. Going off at odds of 1:10, he dueled with White Rammer for the early lead while completing the first quarter-mile in a swift 22 1/5 seconds. He kept up the pace, completing the half-mile in 44 seconds and six furlongs in 1:08 flat (which would have been a new track record). Eased in the final sixteenth of a mile, he still set a seven-furlong track record of 1:20 3/5 in winning by nine lengths. Despite the ease of the win, Turner was concerned, fearing the colt was using too much energy early in his races to withstand the challenge of the longer races to come.

On March 26, Seattle Slew entered the Flamingo Stakes, where he went off at odds of 1:5. He set his own pace and opened a large lead moving into the final turn. He was eased down the stretch but still won by four lengths in a time of 1:47 2/5 for 1 1/8 miles – the third-fastest time in the stakes' 51-year history.

He then shipped north to Aqueduct Racetrack in New York, where he became the subject of intense media scrutiny. His owners considered entering him in the Gotham Stakes on April 9 but Turner was against it because heavy rains had rendered the main track unusable, meaning the colt had not been able to properly work out. Instead, Seattle Slew made his third start of the year on April 23 in the Wood Memorial Stakes. Going off as the 1:10 favorite, he went to the early lead, challenged by Fratello Ed. Cruguet got the colt to relax and they set sensible fractions, then coasted to a 3 1/4 length win. The time of 1:49 3/5 was considered unimpressive, but his connections were pleased by the horse's demeanor. "He doesn't have to run the way he has before," said Cruguet. "He was never really pressed."

==== Kentucky Derby ====
The "Slew Crew" then relocated to Churchill Downs where the Taylors set up a camper opposite the colt's stall in Barn 42, which traditionally houses the favorite for the Kentucky Derby. With Mickey Taylor's father acting as chief bodyguard for the colt, the connections dealt with a constant stream of visitors. Showing his growing maturity, Seattle Slew remained relaxed throughout the week leading up to the race. His training did not go entirely to expectations however when he posted an uncharacteristically slow workout the Sunday before the race. Turner planned to sharpen the colt with a five-furlong breeze on the Thursday before the race but the track came up muddy. Seattle Slew's final workout was a three-furlong breeze in 34 2/5 seconds the morning before the Derby was held.

The 1977 Kentucky Derby was held on May 7 before a crowd of 124,028. The track was rated as fast despite showers earlier in the day. Seattle Slew was the heavy favorite at odds of 1:2 but still faced a large field as many felt the colt would be vulnerable at the Derby's distance of 1 1/4 miles. The second choice was Run Dusty Run, who had been the second-ranked two-year-old and had run second in several major Derby prep races. For the Moment was also given a strong chance after winning the Blue Grass Stakes.

In reaction to the crowd noise, Seattle Slew washed out in the paddock and again during the post parade. Cruguet did little to warm up the colt, instead taking him away from the crowd to relax. He had drawn post position three, and had to wait in the starting gate for the rest of the field to load. Slew reacted slowly at the break then swerved nearly sideways and found himself trapped near the back of the field. He reacted by charging through the field, bumping several other horses who were in his way. After two furlongs, he had worked his way into second place just behind For the Moment. The two colts then dueled around the first turn before Cruguet got Seattle Slew to relax down the backstretch, under a tight restraint, allowing For the Moment to open up a lead of a length. For the Moment completed the first three-quarters of a mile in 1:10 3/5, then was joined again by Seattle Slew as they moved around the final turn. At the top of the stretch, Cruguet went to the whip and Seattle Slew pulled away by 4 lengths, then shut down in the final eighth of a mile to win by 1 3/4 lengths over Run Dusty Run.

The colt still had his detractors. The final time of 2:02 1/5 was considered slow, particularly as the final quarter mile was run in 26 1/5 seconds. Turner pointed to the interruptions in the colt's training. "Because of the circumstances, he was somewhat undertrained. You knew it, and I knew it," he said.

Seattle Slew was visibly upset after the race. "It was the only time I was scared of him," said his groom, John Polston. "He was so high-strung that night, he was evil, just evil. I couldn't believe how wound tight he was. It was like he hadn't even been in a race. I had to take him from the hotwalker and he ran over me a couple of times. I'd never seen him like that before."

==== Preakness Stakes ====
Two weeks later, in the 1 3/16-mile Preakness Stakes, Seattle Slew faced a new rival in multiple-stakes-winner Cormorant. Many handicappers believed a predicted speed duel with Cormorant would jeopardize the Derby winner's chances; Andrew Beyer picked Cormorant to win in his Washington Post column. Other highly rated contenders were J. O. Tobin, the English champion two-year-old colt of 1976, and Iron Constitution, who had won the Withers Stakes. For the first time, Turner chose to have the colt given butazolidin before the race, fearing that Seattle Slew might suffer a minor injury in his final workout.

Seattle Slew broke from post position 8 with Cormorant to his inside on a track with a definite bias for runners on the rail. As expected, the two battled for the early lead, sprinting nearly ten lengths clear of the rest of the field while setting fast fractions of 22 3/5 seconds for the first quarter-mile and 45 3/5 for the first half. Around the far turn, Seattle Slew started to open up a lead while completing the mile in 1:34 4/5. Cruguet then eased up on the colt down the stretch, allowing Iron Constitution to close to within 1 1/2 lengths. The final time of 1:54 2/5 was one of the fastest in the history of the race, especially notable as the track was considered to be somewhat dead.

==== Belmont Stakes ====
Seattle Slew trained well during the three weeks between the Preakness and Belmont Stakes, showing a new level of determination according to Turner. During one of his final workouts, Slew was pulled up early by his exercise rider. "He was afraid he could not hold him," said Turner. "I had warned the outriders, too. This horse might have gone around two or three times."

The 1977 Belmont Stakes was run on June 11 on a muddy track before a crowd of 70,229, with eight rivals facing Seattle Slew. Turner arrived late at the saddling enclosure, due in part to the number of cars parked on the backstretch, as well as his desire to limit the colt's exposure to the enthusiastic crowd. "Turner was fined," said Sally Hill later. "We paid the fine. They weren't going to start the race without him."

Going off at odds of 2:5, Seattle Slew went to the early lead. Though pressed at first by Spirit Level and then Run Dusty Run, he was able to relax, completing the opening mile in a leisurely 1:38 4/5. Spirit Level and Run Dusty Run closed down the gap around the far turn, and then Sanhedrin made a strong run to move into second place, raising concerns about Slew's ability to complete the distance. Seattle Slew responded to the challenge in the final quarter-mile when he opened up daylight between himself and the rest of the field. Down the stretch, Cruguet tapped him with the whip a few times to keep the colt's mind on the race and Seattle Slew won comfortably by four lengths over Run Dusty Run. He became the tenth American Triple Crown winner and (with his nine-for-nine record) was the first Triple Crown winner to finish the series undefeated.

Cruguet stood up in the stirrups and raised his right hand triumphantly some 20 yards before the finish line, leading some to criticize him for the "emotional flourish". Cruguet described his feelings as "happiness, just happiness" before hurrying off to ride in the next race. Turner was harder hit. "I ducked into a stall and broke down and cried," he said. "It was such a relief, because the pressure was off."

==== Aftermath ====
After the Triple Crown, Seattle Slew was sent to Hollywood Park Racetrack, which increased the purse for the Swaps Stakes to over $300,000 to lure him to run on July 3. In the Swaps, Seattle Slew was unable to get to the front as jockey Bill Shoemaker sent J.O. Tobin to the lead. J.O. Tobin set fast early fractions for a 1 1/4-mile race – 22 2/5 for the first quarter-mile, 45 2/5 for the half, 1:09 1/5 for six furlongs and 1:33 3/5 for the mile. Seattle Slew, boxed in for much of the race with Text to his side, eventually broke free but tired badly in the stretch. He finished fourth, 16 lengths behind J.O. Tobin, who won in a stakes record of 1:58 2/5, just two-fifths off the world record for the distance at that time.

The race was the cause of much controversy. Before shipping to California, Seattle Slew had been sedated repeatedly to be used in a Xerox advertising campaign for a new X-ray machine, then was sedated again during the flight. Turner believed this contributed to Seattle Slew's dull effort. Turner also said that he had disagreed with the decision to ship to California at all, feeling the colt needed more time to recover from the Triple Crown. The owners said that Turner had not raised objections prior to the race, and further that Turner's drinking problems were putting the horse at risk. At the end of the year, Turner was fired and replaced by Douglas Peterson.

Meanwhile, Seattle Slew was given time off to recover, then resumed training in August for a fall campaign. However, he was sidelined by a suspension to Hill, whose ownership share had been previously undisclosed. Despite the disappointing end to the season, Seattle Slew was the easy winner in the voting for champion three-year-old at the annual Eclipse Awards. The voting for American Horse of the Year honors was closer, with Seattle Slew prevailing over Forego by 105 1/2 votes to 84 1/2.

=== 1978 ===
In early 1978, Seattle Slew was stabled at Hialeah and was expected to make three or four starts in Florida, followed by a full campaign in New York's major stakes races. He was scheduled to make the first start of his four-year-old campaign on January 16, 1978, in the Tallahassee Handicap. However, he was scratched from the race on January 14 when he lost his appetite and was found to have a fever of 102. His condition then went quickly downhill, marked by weakness, dehydration and a sharp decrease in his white blood cell count. It was later revealed that his jugular vein had collapsed when a pre-race injection of butazolidin missed the vein.

While Seattle Slew slowly recovered, his owners contemplated retiring him to stud. Instead, they kept him in training for 1978 while syndicating him for a then-record $12 million. The Taylor and Hill families retained 50% of the shares while Brownwell Combs of Spendthrift Farm headed the syndication group.

Seattle Slew eventually returned to training and was shipped north to Aqueduct, which held "Seattle Slew day" on April 29. A crowd of 25,931 cheered while Seattle Slew was led around the paddock and then taken on track for a six-furlong workout, completed handily in 1:10 1/5. On May 14, Seattle Slew returned to racing in a seven-furlong allowance race. Over an extremely muddy track, he settled in second place behind Gallant Bob for the first quarter-mile, then started to open up on the field, eventually winning by 8 1/4 lengths. Despite the adverse track conditions and never being urged by Cruguet, his time was a "brisk" 1:22 4/5.

Seattle Slew was being pointed to the Metropolitan Handicap at the end of May but suffered another setback when a filling in his left hind leg was discovered. The problem was thought to be minor, but it was not until August that he made his next start. This was in a seven-furlong allowance race at Saratoga Race Course, which he won by six lengths in 1:21 3/5 over a sloppy track.

In preparation for his fall campaign, Seattle Slew was sent to the Meadowlands on September 5 for a night race, the Paterson Handicap at a distance of 1 1/8 miles. He went off as the 1:5 favorite despite being assigned 128 pounds. His main rival was Dr. Patches, who had an excellent record at the Meadowlands and was carrying only 114 pounds. Seattle Slew went straight to the lead and set fast early fractions. Turning for home though, Dr. Patches made his move and slowly drew past. Seattle Slew tried to fight back but lost by a neck in a major upset. Jean Cruguet lost the mount after the race, after expressing doubt if the horse had been sufficiently trained.

==== Marlboro Cup ====
The 1978 Marlboro Cup, run on September 16, was the first time that two Triple Crown winners raced each other. Affirmed had won the Triple Crown in a thrilling showdown with Alydar, and had won all but one of his starts that year, that loss coming by disqualification. Taylor was not concerned by Affirmed's reputation. "We've watched every one of his races this year and watched them carefully," he said. "He's an outstanding horse, but so is Slew. Affirmed had better be ready when the Marlboro Cup comes up, because he's going to see one big, black butt in front of him."

For the only time in his career, Seattle Slew was not the favorite, going off at 2:1 compared to Affirmed at 1:2. Affirmed and Seattle Slew were both known as front-runners but Seattle Slew's new jockey Angel Cordero Jr. felt that Affirmed had benefited from setting slow early fractions in his early races. He sent Seattle Slew to the lead and completed the first quarter in an easy 24 seconds, then picked up the pace down the backstretch to complete the half-mile in 47 seconds with Affirmed two lengths behind. Rounding the final turn into the stretch, Cordero allowed Slew to swing wide. Affirmed came up on the inside, but Seattle Slew responded to beat Affirmed by three lengths, with Nasty And Bold in third, five lengths further back. He completed the distance of 1 1/8 miles in a time of 1:45 4/5, just two-fifths of a second off the world record set by Secretariat in the 1973 Marlboro Cup.

"I knew when we were able to go to the lead that we could win it," Cordero said. "Slew is such a nice horse and I was able to relax him on the backstretch. There isn't a horse in the world that could have beaten him today."

==== Woodward Stakes ====
Two weeks later, Seattle Slew was entered in the Woodward Stakes, then held at Belmont Park over the American classic distance of 1 1/4 miles. Affirmed skipped the race, making Exceller the main contender in a field of five. Seattle Slew coasted through the first quarter in 24 4/5 seconds, then picked up the pace under slight pressure from Exceller, normally known for his closing kick. Turning for home, Cordero used the whip twice and Seattle Slew drew off to win by four lengths. His time of 2 minutes flat for 1 1/4 miles was a Belmont course record for a race started on the turn. (At that time, 10 furlong races at Belmont were normally started in a chute, allowing the horses to run straight for about half the race. However, the chute was under repair in 1978). The winnings from the race made Seattle Slew the 23rd horse in racing history to earn a million dollars.

==== Jockey Club Gold Cup ====
In October, Seattle Slew and Affirmed met again in the 1 1/2-mile Jockey Club Gold Cup at Belmont, which was televised nationally on the CBS network. Affirmed's trainer, Laz Barrera, did not want Seattle Slew to get an easy lead and dictate the pace as he had in the Marlboro Cup, so Barrera also entered a "rabbit" (Life's Hope) in an attempt to tire Slew. Seattle Slew ran in fractions of 22 3/5 for the first quarter, 45 1/5 for the half and 1:09 2/5 for three-quarters – extremely fast early times for a long race. Life's Hope dropped back, then Affirmed also faltered, having raced too close to the pace. Affirmed's problems were compounded when his saddle slipped.

Meanwhile, Bill Shoemaker on Exceller took advantage of the fast pace. Far back early, Exceller made a strong move on the far turn and saved ground by moving inside Seattle Slew as the tiring horse bore out turning for home. Exceller took the lead at the top of the stretch, and opened a half-length lead in midstretch. Seattle Slew fought back and lost by a nose in a photo finish. This stretch run is still remembered as among the all-time best, ranking with Sunday Silence and Easy Goer's Preakness in 1989 and the battles between Affirmed and Alydar. Despite the defeat, many analysts considered this to be Seattle Slew's greatest performance. Andrew Beyer (a Seattle Slew skeptic when the horse was a three-year-old) wrote for his lead, "Exceller was the winner of yesterday's Jockey Club Gold Cup, Seattle Slew was its hero."

==== Stuyvesant Handicap ====
Seattle Slew's last race was in the Stuyvesant Handicap on November 11 at Aqueduct Racetrack. He was assigned the high weight of 134 pounds (61 kg), conceding his rivals from 19 to 27 pounds. As the 1-10 favorite, he went to the early lead and was never challenged, winning by 3 1/4 lengths. He completed the 1 1/8-mile race in 1:47 2/5, just off the track and stakes record set by Riva Ridge in 1973. Watching the race were Turner and Cruguet, who both expressed regret that they'd had to part ways with the horse. "Even now," said Cruguet, "he should be undefeated".

Seattle Slew retired with 14 wins in 17 races and earnings of $1,208,726. He was named Champion Older Horse in 1978 but lost the Horse of the Year balloting to the horse he defeated in the Marlboro Cup, Affirmed.

== Statistics ==
Date	Age	Distance	Race	Grade	Track	Odds	Field	Finish	Winning Time	Margin	Jockey
Sep 20, 1976	2	6 furlongs	Maiden Special Weight		Belmont Park	*2.60	12	1	1:10 1/5	5 lengths	Jean Cruguet
Oct 5, 1976	2	7 furlongs	Allowance		Belmont Park	*0.40	8	1	1:22	3 1/2 lengths	Jean Cruguet
Oct 16, 1976	2	1 mile	Champagne Stakes	I	Belmont Park	*1.30	10	1	1:34 2/5	2 lengths	Jean Cruguet
Mar 9, 1977	3	7 furlongs	Allowance		Hialeah	*0.10	8	1	1:20 3/5	9 lengths	Jean Cruguet
Mar 26, 1977	3	1 1/8 miles	Flamingo Stakes	I	Hialeah	*0.20	13	1	1:47 2/5	4 lengths	Jean Cruguet
Apr 23, 1977	3	1 1/8 miles	Wood Memorial	I	Aqueduct	*0.10	7	1	1:49 3/5	3 3/4 lengths	Jean Cruguet
May 7, 1977	3	1 1/4 miles	Kentucky Derby	I	Churchill Downs	*0.50	15	1	2:02 1/5	1 3/4 lengths	Jean Cruguet
May 21, 1977	3	1 3/16 miles	Preakness Stakes	I	Pimlico	*0.40	9	1	1:54 2/5	1 1/2 lengths	Jean Cruguet
Jun 11, 1977	3	1 1/2 miles	Belmont Stakes	I	Belmont	*0.40	8	1	2:29 3/5	4 lengths	Jean Cruguet
Jul 3, 1977	3	1 1/4 miles	Swaps Stakes	I	Hollywood Park	*0.20	7	4	1:58 3/5	(16 lengths)	Jean Cruguet
May 14, 1978	4	7 furlongs	Allowance		Aqueduct	*0.10	6	1	1:22 4/5	8 1/4 lengths	Jean Cruguet
Aug 12, 1978	4	7 furlongs	Allowance		Saratoga	*0.10	5	1	1:21 3/5	6 lengths	Jean Cruguet
Sep 5, 1978	4	1 1/8 miles	Paterson Handicap	III	Meadowlands	*0.20	10	2	1:48	(neck)	Jean Cruguet
Sep 16, 1978	4	1 1/8 miles	Marlboro Cup Handicap	I	Belmont	2.10	6	1	1:45 4/5	3 lengths	Angel Cordero Jr.
Sep 30, 1978	4	1 1/4 miles	Woodward Stakes	I	Belmont	*0.30	5	1	2:00	4 lengths	Angel Cordero Jr.
Oct 14, 1978	4	1 1/2 miles	Jockey Club Gold Cup	I	Belmont	*0.60	6	2	2:27 1/5	(nose)	Angel Cordero Jr.
Nov 11, 1978	4	1 1/8 miles	Stuyvesant Handicap	III	Aqueduct	*0.10	5	1	1:47 2/5	3 1/4 lengths	Angel Cordero Jr.

An asterisk before the odds means that Seattle Slew was the post-time favorite.

Source: Daily Racing Form

== Stud career ==
Seattle Slew as an older horse

Seattle Slew stood at stud at Spendthrift Farm in Lexington for seven years, before moving to Three Chimneys Farm in Midway in 1985. He was the leading sire of 1984, when his son Swale (who died later that year) won the Kentucky Derby and Belmont Stakes. He is part of a unique three generation sequence of Belmont Stakes Winners: Seattle Slew (who won the race in 1977) sired A.P. Indy (1992) who in turn sired Rags to Riches. Rags to Riches was just the third filly to win the race, after Ruthless in 1867 and Tanya in 1905. The victory earned jockey John Velazquez and trainer Todd Pletcher their first wins in any Triple Crown race.

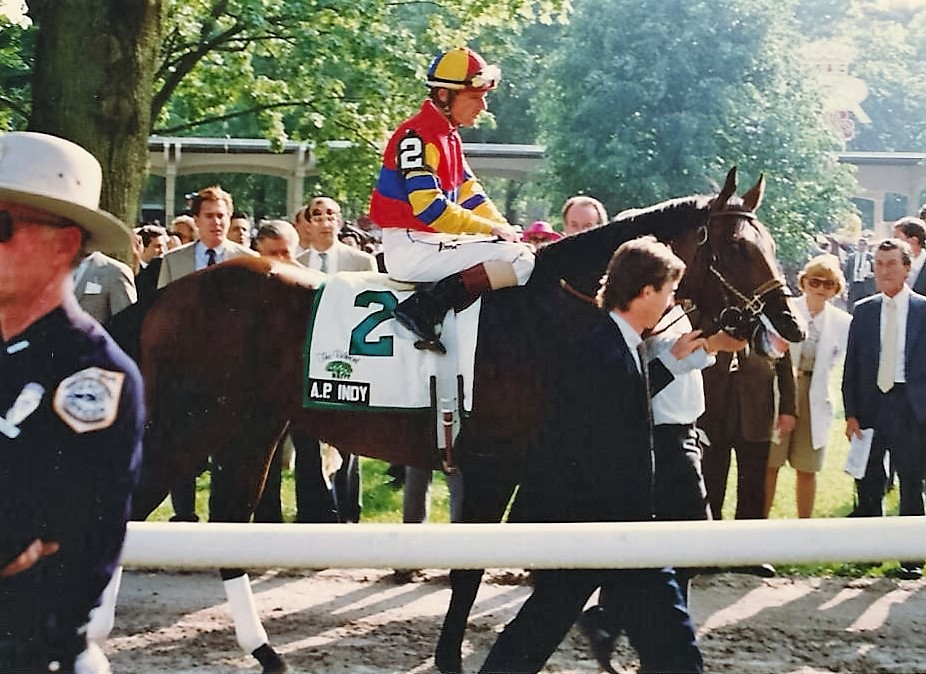
A.P. Indy, Seattle Slew's most successful son at stud

Seattle Slew sired 1,103 named foals, of which 537 (48.7%) were winners and 111 (10.1%) were stakes winners. Major winners by Seattle Slew include:

- A.P. Indy – Belmont Stakes, Breeders' Cup Classic, 1992 Horse of the Year (USA) and champion three-year-old, Hall of Fame inductee
- Adored – Santa Margarita, Delaware Handicap
- Capote – Breeders' Cup Juvenile
- Dantsu Seattle - Takarazuka Kinen
- Fleet Renee – Ashland, Mother Goose
- Flute – Kentucky Oaks
- Hail Atlantis – Santa Anita Oaks
- Lakeway – Santa Anita Oaks, Hollywood Oaks, Mother Goose
- Landaluce – Oak Leaf Stakes, Champion two-year-old filly
- Life at the Top – Mother Goose
- Magic of Life – Coronation Stakes
- Seattle Song – Prix de la Salamandre, Washington DC International
- Septieme Ciel – Prix de la Forêt
- Slew City Slew – Oaklawn Handicap, Gulfstream Park Handicap
- Slew o' Gold - multiple stakes winner including Jockey Club Gold Cup (twice), Woodward Stakes (twice), Marlboro Stakes, Wood Memorial. Champion three-year-old (1983) and champion older horse (1984). Hall of fame inductee
- Slewpy – Young American Stakes, Meadowlands Cup
- Surfside – multiple stakes winner including Frizette and Santa Anita Oaks. Champion three-year-old filly (2000)
- Swale – Kentucky Derby and Belmont Stakes
- Taiki Blizzard – Yasuda Kinen
- Vindication – Breeders' Cup Juvenile, Champion Two-Year-Old Colt of 2002

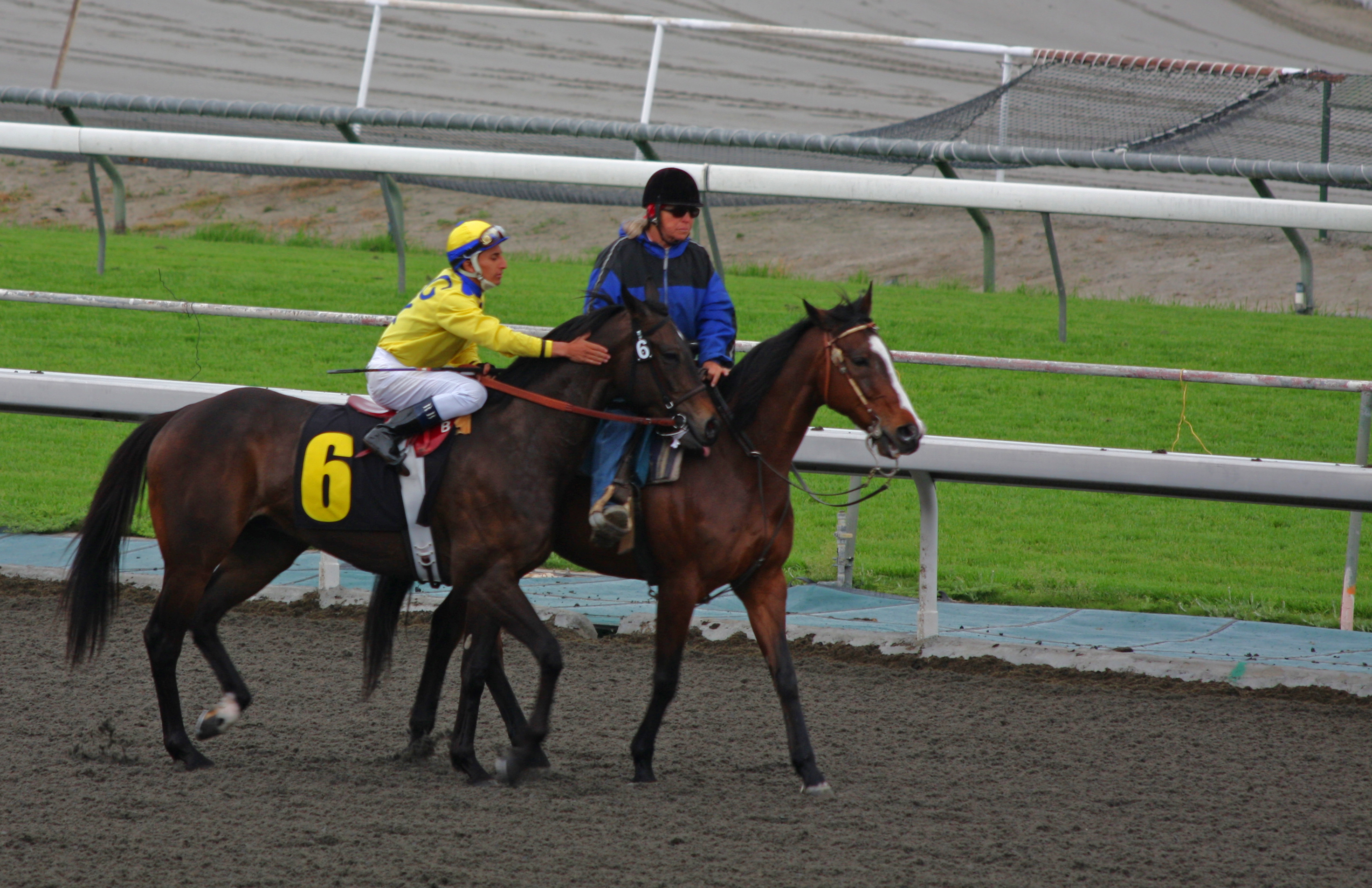
Philly Slew, pictured left, is Seattle Slew's grandchild

The primary conduit for the continuation of Seattle Slew's male line has been through A.P. Indy, who was the leading sire in North America of 2003 and 2006. A.P. Indy sired the 2003 Horse of the Year, Mineshaft, Preakness Stakes winner Bernardini and Belmont Stakes winner Rags to Riches. A.P. Indy's grandsons include Tapit. the leading North American sire in 2014, 2015 and 2016. Slew City Slew was also a good sire, whose sons include California champion Lava Man. In 2006, Lava Man became the first horse to win the Santa Anita Handicap, Hollywood Gold Cup and Pacific Classic Stakes in the same year.

In 2014, Seattle Slew's great-great-grandson, California Chrome, won the Kentucky Derby and the Preakness. California Chrome was the second Kentucky Derby winner in a row who was a sire-line descendant of Seattle Slew, following Orb in 2013. California Chrome's bid for the Triple Crown was defeated by another great-grandson of Seattle Slew, Tonalist, by Tapit. Tapit also sired the winners of the 2016 and 2017 Belmont Stakes, Creator and Tapwrit respectively.

Seattle Slew was also a notable broodmare sire, leading the North American list in both 1995 and 1996. His daughters produced (among others) Cigar, the leading North American money-earner of his day.

== Legacy ==
Seattle Slew underwent spinal fusion surgery at Rood and Riddle Equine Hospital for a neurological condition in 2000, followed by a second surgery in 2002. Upon recovery from the second surgery, he was moved to Hill 'n' Dale Farm to recover: his old stall at Three Chimney's was too close to the breeding shed, and he became agitated whenever mares arrived at the farm.

On May 7, 2002, 25 years to the day after he won the Kentucky Derby, Seattle Slew died in his sleep at age 28. He was buried whole at Hill 'n' Dale, the highest honor for a winning race horse, with his favorite blanket and a bag of peppermints. Three Chimneys Farm erected a statue of Seattle Slew near the stallion barn in his honor. Since fellow Triple Crown winner and rival Affirmed had died the year before, he had been the sole living Triple Crown winner. At the horse's death, there were no living Triple Crown winners for the first time since Sir Barton won the first Triple Crown in 1919. This phenomenon continued until American Pharoah's Triple Crown in 2015.

The Taylors remained close to Seattle Slew throughout his life and were with him at the time of his death. "He had the greatest heart," said Karen Taylor. "He was a fighter to the end." John Sikura of Hill 'n' Dale commented, "To be near greatness is what everyone in this business aspires to, and it happens so rarely. He was one in a million, and showed us there is that possibility in a game of impossibilities."

Seattle Slew was inducted into the National Museum of Racing and Hall of Fame in 1981. In the BloodHorse magazine's listing of the top 100 American thoroughbreds of the twentieth century, he was ranked ninth. A British publication, A Century of Champions, ranked him fourth among North American racehorses. In 2002, ESPN telecast a "SportsCentury" on Seattle Slew.

The book Seattle Slew, by Steve Cady and Barton Silverman, was released by Penguin Books in 1977. In 2000, the Eclipse Press released another book of the same title, written by Dan Mearns as part of the Thoroughbred Legends series.

In 2015, the state of Kentucky started issuing a license plate bearing Seattle Slew's image, based on a photograph by Tony Leonard. Proceeds benefit the Kentucky Equine Education Project Foundation (KEEP).

== Pedigree ==
Pedigree of Seattle Slew
Sire Bold Reasoning	Boldnesian	Bold Ruler	Nasrullah*
Sire Bold Reasoning	Boldnesian	Bold Ruler	Miss Disco
Sire Bold Reasoning	Boldnesian	Alanesian	Polynesian
Sire Bold Reasoning	Boldnesian	Alanesian	Alablue
Sire Bold Reasoning	Reason to Earn	Hail to Reason	Turn-To
Sire Bold Reasoning	Reason to Earn	Hail to Reason	Nothirdchance
Sire Bold Reasoning	Reason to Earn	Sailing House	Wait a Bit
Sire Bold Reasoning	Reason to Earn	Sailing House	Marching Home
Dam My Charmer	Poker	Round Table	Princequillo
Dam My Charmer	Poker	Round Table	Knight's Daughter
Dam My Charmer	Poker	Glamour	Nasrullah*
Dam My Charmer	Poker	Glamour	Striking
Dam My Charmer	Fair Charmer	Jet Action	Jet Pilot
Dam My Charmer	Fair Charmer	Jet Action	Busher
Dam My Charmer	Fair Charmer	Myrtle Charm	Alsab
Dam My Charmer	Fair Charmer	Myrtle Charm	Crepe Myrtle (Family 13-c)

- Seattle Slew was inbred 4s x 4d to the stallion Nasrullah, meaning that Nasrullah appears twice in the fourth generation of his pedigree, once on the sire side and once on the dam side.

== See also ==
- A.P. Indy
- Exceller
- Three Chimneys Farm
