= May 2009 in sports =

<<	May 2009					>>
Su	Mo	Tu	We	Th	Fr	Sa
					1	2
3	4	5	6	7	8	9
10	11	12	13	14	15	16
17	18	19	20	21	22	23
24	25	26	27	28	29	30
31
Sports

This list shows notable sports-related deaths, events, and notable outcomes that occurred in May of 2009.

== Deaths in May ==
- 1: Sunline
- 2: Jack Kemp
- 3: John Elsworthy
- 5: Benjamin Flores
- 7: Danny Ozark
- 8: Dom DiMaggio
- 9: Chuck Daly
- 13: Achille Compagnoni
- 14: Bob Rosburg
- 15: Wayman Tisdale
- 29: Karine Ruby

== Current sporting seasons ==
=== American football 2009 ===
- NFL
- NCAA Division I FBS

=== Australian rules football 2009 ===
- Australian Football League

=== Auto racing 2009 ===
- Formula One
- Sprint Cup
- IRL IndyCar Series
- Formula Two
- Nationwide Series
- Camping World Truck Series
- GP2
- WTTC
- V8 Supercar
- American Le Mans
- Le Mans Series
- Rolex Sports Car Series
- FIA GT Championship
- Formula Three
- World Series by Renault
- Deutsche Tourenwagen Masters
- Super GT

=== Baseball 2009 ===
- Major League Baseball
- Nippon Professional Baseball

=== Basketball 2009 ===
- American competitions:
  - NBA playoffs
- Greece – playoffs
- Italy – playoffs
- Philippines
  - Fiesta Conference – playoffs
- Spain – playoffs
- Turkey – playoffs

=== Football (soccer) 2009 ===
National teams competitions

- 2010 FIFA World Cup Qualifying

International clubs competitions

- Copa Libertadores (South America)
- AFC (Asia) Champions League
- CAF (Africa) Champions League

Domestic (national) competitions

- Argentina
- Brazil
- Japan
- Norway
- Russia
- Major League Soccer (USA&Canada)
- Women's Professional Soccer (USA)

=== Golf 2009 ===
- European Tour
- PGA Tour
- LPGA Tour
- Champions Tour

=== Ice hockey 2009 ===
- Stanley Cup Finals

=== Lacrosse 2009 ===
- Major League Lacrosse

=== Motorcycle racing 2009 ===
- Superbike World Championship
- Supersport racing

=== Rugby league 2009 ===
- Super League
- NRL

=== Rugby union 2009 ===
- Top 14

== Days of the month ==
=== May 31, 2009 (Sunday) ===
==== Auto racing ====
- Sprint Cup Series:
  - Autism Speaks 400 in Dover, Delaware:
    - (1) Jimmie Johnson (California) (Hendrick Motorsports) (2) Tony Stewart (Indiana) (Stewart Haas Racing) (3) Greg Biffle (Washington (state)) (Roush Fenway Racing)
      - Drivers standings (after 13 of 26 races leading into the Chase for the Sprint Cup): (1) Stewart 1853 points (2) Jeff Gordon (California) (Hendrick Motorsports) 1807 (3) Johnson 1789
- IndyCar Series:
  - ABC Supply Company A.J. Foyt 225 in West Allis, Wisconsin:
    - (1) Scott Dixon (New Zealand) (Chip Ganassi Racing) (2) Ryan Briscoe (Australia) (Team Penske) (3) Dario Franchitti (United Kingdom) (Chip Ganassi Racing)
      - Standings (after 5 of 17 races): (1) Dixon 161 points (2) Briscoe & Franchitti 157
- World Touring Car Championship:
  - Race of Spain in Valencia:
    - Race 1: (1) Yvan Muller (France) (SEAT León 2.0 TDI) (2) Tiago Monteiro (Portugal) (SEAT León 2.0 TDI) (3) Gabriele Tarquini (Italy) (SEAT León 2.0 TDI)
    - Race 2: (1) Augusto Farfus (Brazil) (BMW 320si) (2) Jörg Müller (Germany) (BMW 320si) (3) Tarquini
      - Standings (after 10 of 24 races): (1) Yvan Muller 57 points (2) Farfus 54 (3) Tarquini 46
- Deutsche Tourenwagen Masters:
  - Round 2 in Klettwitz, Germany:
    - (1) Gary Paffett (United Kingdom) (Mercedes-Benz C-Class) (2) Bruno Spengler (Canada) (Mercedes-Benz C-Class) (3) Mattias Ekström (Sweden) (Audi A4)
      - Standings (after 2 of 10 races): (1) Timo Scheider (Germany) (Audi A4) 12 points (2) Paffett & Tom Kristensen (Denmark) (Audi A4) 10
- V8 Supercars:
  - Falken Tasmania Challenge in Launceston, Tasmania
    - Round 8: (1) Jamie Whincup (Australia) (Ford Falcon) (2) Will Davison (Australia) (Holden Commodore) (3) Fabian Coulthard (New Zealand) (Ford Falcon)
      - Standings (after 8 of 26 races): (1) Whincup 1044 points (2) Davison 948 (3) Steven Johnson (Australia) (Ford Falcon) 753

==== Baseball ====
- Major League Baseball
  - Philadelphia Phillies pitcher Jamie Moyer wins his 250th game when the Phils beat the Washington Nationals 4–2.
- NCAA tournament
  - Florida State defeats Ohio State 37–6, setting a record for most runs scored in an NCAA postseason game, in the final of their regional tournament in Tallahassee, Florida.

==== Cycling ====
- Giro d'Italia:
  - Stage 21 (ITT): (1) Ignatas Konovalovas (Lithuania) (Cervélo TestTeam) 18' 42" (2) Bradley Wiggins (United Kingdom) (Garmin–Slipstream) + 1" (3) Edvald Boasson Hagen (Norway) (Team Columbia–High Road) + 7"
    - Final general classification: (gold) Denis Menchov (Russia) (Rabobank) 86h 03' 11" (silver) Danilo Di Luca (Italy) (LPR Brakes–Farnese Vini) + 41" (bronze) Franco Pellizotti (Italy) (Liquigas) + 1' 59"

==== Football (soccer) ====
- European domestic (national) competitions: (listed by countries' alphabetic order; league standings prior to match in parentheses; teams that win titles in **bold**; teams that qualify to the Champions League in italics)
  - (Belarus) Belarusian Cup Final:
    - Shakhtyor Soligorsk 1–2 (ET) **Naftan Novopolotsk**
      - Naftan win their first ever trophy, and qualify for Europa League.
  - (Bulgaria) Bulgarian A PFG, matchday 29 of 30:
    - (1) **Levski Sofia** 1–1 (11) Minyor Pernik
    - (5) Litex Lovech 1–0 (2) CSKA Sofia
      - Levski clinch the championship for the 26th time, and qualify for the Champions League. CSKA, Cherno More Varna and Cup winners Litex qualify for Europa League.
  - (Greece) Greek Super League playoffs, final matchday:
    - (2) AEK Athens 0–2 (1) Panathinaikos
      - Panathinaikos win the playoffs and qualify for the Champions League. AEK, PAOK and AEL qualify for Europa League.
  - (Italy) Italian Serie A, final matchday:
    - (4) Fiorentina 0–2 (2) Milan
    - (3) Juventus 2–0 (10) Lazio
      - Final standings: **Inter** 84 points, Juventus & Milan 74, Fiorentina & Genoa 68, Roma 63.
      - Milan's win secures them a berth in the Champions League group stage, together with champion Inter and runner-up Juventus. Fiorentina will enter the Champions League at the play-off round. Genoa, Roma and Cup winner Lazio qualify for Europa League. Torino, Reggina and Lecce are relegated to Serie B. Paolo Maldini makes his farewell after 25 seasons and 647 matches, all in Milan.
  - (Portugal) Portuguese Cup Final in Oeiras:
    - **Porto** 1–0 Paços de Ferreira
      - Lisandro López' goal in the 6th minute gives Porto the Cup for the 18th time, and completes a League and Cup double.
  - (Romania) Romanian Liga I, matchday 33 of 34:
    - (2) Dinamo București 0–2 (9) Brașov
    - (3) Timişoara 1–2 (1) **Unirea Urziceni**
      - Unirea clinch the championship for the first time and qualify for the Champions League group stage. Dinamo finish as runner up and will enter the Champions League at the 3rd qualifying round. Timişoara and CFR Cluj qualify for Europa League.
  - (Russia) Russian Cup Final in Khimki:
    - Rubin Kazan 0–1 **CSKA Moscow**
      - Evgeni Aldonin's goal in injury time gives CSKA the Russian Cup for the second successive year and 5th time in history, and denies reigning champion Kazan the double. Both teams already qualified for the Champions League group stage.
  - (Spain) Spanish La Liga, final matchday:
    - (18) Osasuna 2–1 (2) Real Madrid
    - (17) Gijón 2–1 (20) Recreativo
    - (16) Betis 1–1 (14) Valladolid
    - (11) Santander 1–1 (15) Getafe
      - Both Osasuna and Gijón come from behind to win, meaning that Betis' draw is not enough to keep them from relegation to next season's Segunda División, along with Numancia and Recreativo.
  - (Ukraine) Ukrainian Cup Final in Dnipropetrovsk:
    - **Vorskla Poltava** 1–0 Shakhtar Donetsk
      - Poltava win the Cup for the first time, and qualify for Europa League.

==== Golf ====
- PGA Tour:
  - Crowne Plaza Invitational at Colonial in Fort Worth, Texas
    - Winner: Steve Stricker (United States) 263 (−17) PO
      - Stricker birdies the second hole of the playoff to defeat Tim Clark (South Africa) and Steve Marino (United States) .
- European Tour:
  - European Open in Kent, England
    - Winner: Christian Cévaër (France) 281 (−7)

==== Ice hockey ====
- Stanley Cup Finals: (seeding in parentheses)
  - Game 2 in Detroit: (W2) Detroit Red Wings 3, (E4) Pittsburgh Penguins 1. **Red Wings lead series 2–0.**
    - Penguins centre Evgeni Malkin gets a game misconduct for instigating a fight with Henrik Zetterberg in the final minute of the game, but does not get suspended for Game 3.

==== Motorcycle racing ====
- Moto GP:
  - Italian motorcycle Grand Prix in Mugello, Italy
    - (1) Casey Stoner (Australia) (2) Jorge Lorenzo (Spain) (3) Valentino Rossi (Italy)
      - Riders' standings after 5 of 17 races: (1) Stoner 90 points (2) Lorenzo 86 (3) Rossi 81
- Superbike World Championship:
  - Miller Superbike World Championship round in Tooele, Utah, United States
    - Race 1: (1) Ben Spies (United States) (2) Carlos Checa (Spain) (3) Michel Fabrizio (Italy)
    - Race 2: (1) Spies (2) Fabrizio (3) Jonathan Rea (United Kingdom)
      - Riders' standings after 7 of 14 rounds: (1) Noriyuki Haga (Japan) 265 points (2) Spies 212 (3) Fabrizio 201

==== Rugby union ====
- Mid-year test series:
  - United States 10–27 Ireland in Santa Clara, California
- Sevens World Series:
  - Scotland Sevens in Edinburgh:
    - Final: South Africa 19–20 Fiji
      - Final series standings: (1) South Africa 132 points (2) Fiji 102 (3) England 98

==== Tennis ====
- French Open in Paris, day 8: (seeding in parentheses)
  - Men's singles, round of 16:
    - Robin Söderling (Sweden) [23] bt Rafael Nadal (Spain) [1] 6–2 6–7(2) 6–4 7–6(2)
      - Söderling stops Nadal's record winning streak at the French Open at 31 matches.
    - Andy Murray (United Kingdom) [3] bt Marin Čilić (Croatia) [13] 7–5 7–6(4) 6–1
    - Nikolay Davydenko (Russia) [10] bt Fernando Verdasco (Spain) [8] 6–2, 6–2, 6–4
    - Fernando González (Chile) [12] bt Victor Hănescu (Romania) [30] 6–2, 6–4, 6–2
  - Women's singles, round of 16:
    - Dinara Safina (Russia) [1] bt Aravane Rezaï (France) 6–1 6–0
    - Victoria Azarenka (Belarus) [9] bt Ana Ivanovic (Serbia) [8] 6–2 6–3
    - Dominika Cibulková (Slovakia) [20] bt Ágnes Szávay (Hungary) [29] 6–2, 6–4
    - Maria Sharapova (Russia) bt Li Na (China) [25] 6–4, 0–6, 6–4

=== May 30, 2009 (Saturday) ===
==== Auto racing ====
- Nationwide Series:
  - Heluva Good! 200 in Dover, Delaware
    - (1) Brad Keselowski (Michigan) (JR Motorsports) (2) Joey Logano (Connecticut) (Joe Gibbs Racing) (3) Clint Bowyer (Kansas) (Richard Childress Racing)
- V8 Supercars:
  - Falken Tasmania Challenge in Launceston, Tasmania
    - Round 7: (1) Garth Tander (Australia) (2) Russell Ingall (Australia) (3) Steven Johnson (Australia)
      - Standings (after 7 of 26 races): (1) Jamie Whincup (Australia) 894 points (2) Will Davison 810 (3) Johnson 702

==== Baseball ====
- NCAA tournament
  - In the longest NCAA baseball game played in terms of innings played, Texas defeats Boston College 3–2 in 25 innings at Austin, Texas. In spite of being the host team for this regional tournament, the Longhorns were the designated visiting team for the contest.

==== Basketball ====
- NBA playoffs: (Seeding in parentheses)
  - Eastern Conference Finals:
    - Game 6 in Orlando: (3) Orlando Magic 103, (1) Cleveland Cavaliers 90. **Magic win series 4–2.**
      - Dwight Howard scores 40 points to lead the Magic to their first NBA Finals in 14 years. The Final series will begin in Los Angeles on June 4.

==== Cricket ====
- ICC World Twenty20 in England:
  - Warm-up matches:
    - Ireland 119 (19.2/20 ov); West Indies 120/5 (17.5/20 ov) in Sir Paul Getty's Ground, Wormsley. West Indies win by 5 wickets.

==== Cycling ====
- Giro d'Italia:
  - Stage 20: (1) Philippe Gilbert (Belgium) (Silence–Lotto) 4h 30' 07" (2) Thomas Voeckler (France) (Bbox Bouygues Telecom) + 2" (3) Stefano Garzelli (Italy) (Acqua & Sapone–Caffè Mokambo) + 7"
    - General classification: (1) Denis Menchov (Russia) (Rabobank) 85h 44' 05" (2) Danilo Di Luca (Italy) (LPR Brakes–Farnese Vini) + 20" (3) Franco Pellizotti (Italy) (Liquigas) + 1' 43"

==== Football (soccer) ====
- European domestic (national) competitions: (listed by countries' alphabetic order; league standings prior to match in parentheses; teams that win titles in **bold**; teams that qualify to the Champions League in italics)
  - (Czech Republic) Czech Gambrinus liga, final matchday:
    - (1) **Slavia Prague** 2–2 (3) Slovan Liberec
    - (4) Mladá Boleslav 0–3 (2) Sparta Prague
    - (5) Sigma Olomouc 3–0 (11) Bohemians (Střížkov) Praha
      - Final standings: **Slavia Prague** 62 points, Sparta Prague 56, Liberec 52, Olomouc 48, Jablonec & Mladá Boleslav 46.
      - Sparta clinch second place and qualify for the Champions League. Liberec and Olomouc clinch berths in Europa League, along with Cup winner Teplice.
  - (England) FA Cup Final in London:
    - **Chelsea** 2–1 Everton
      - Everton's Louis Saha scores the fastest goal in FA Cup history after 25 seconds, but Chelsea reply with goals by Didier Drogba and Frank Lampard to win the Cup for the fifth time. Chelsea had already qualified for the Champions League, and Everton were already assured of a berth in the Europa League.
  - (France) French Ligue 1, final matchday:
    - (17) Caen 0–1 (1) **Bordeaux**
    - (2) Marseille 4–0 (6) Rennes
    - (4) Toulouse 0–0 (3) Lyon
    - (5) Paris Saint-Germain 0–0 (12) AS Monaco
    - (7) Lille 3–2 (14) Nancy
      - Final standings: **Bordeaux** 80 points, Marseilles 77, Lyon 73, Toulouse 64 (goal difference +18), Lille 64 (GD +12), PSG 64 (+11), Rennes 61.
      - A goal by Yoan Gouffran in the 49th minute gives Bordeaux the championship for the sixth time, and condemns his former club Caen to relegation, along with Nantes and Le Havre. Toulouse and Lille clinch berths in Europa League, along with Cup winners Guingamp.
  - (Germany) German Cup Final in Berlin:
    - Bayer Leverkusen 0–1 **Werder Bremen**
      - Mesut Özil's goal in the 58th minute gives Werder Bremen the Cup for the sixth time, and a berth in the Europa League.
  - (Poland) Polish Ekstraklasa, final matchday:
    - (1) **Wisła Kraków** 2–0 (6) Śląsk Wrocław
    - (2) Lech Poznań 2–2 (13) Cracovia
    - (3) Legia Warsaw 4–1 (9) Ruch Chorzów
    - (15) Górnik Zabrze 0–1 (4) Polonia Warsaw
    - (8) Jagiellonia Białystok 0–2 (5) GKS Bełchatów
      - Final standings: **Wisła Kraków** 64 points, Legia Warsaw 61, Lech Poznań 59, Polonia Warsaw & GKS Bełchatów 54.
      - Wisła win the championship for the second straight year and 12th time in their history, and qualify for the Champions League. Cup winner Lech Poznań, Legia and Polonia qualify for the Europa League.
  - (Scotland) Scottish Cup Final in Glasgow:
    - **Rangers** 1–0 Falkirk
      - Nacho Novo's goal in the 46th minute gives Rangers the Cup for the 33rd time, and completes a League and Cup double.
  - (Slovenia) Slovenian Cup Final in Maribor:
    - **Interblock Ljubljana** 2–1 Koper
      - Interblock win the Cup for the second straight year, and qualify for the Europa League.
  - (Spain) Spanish La Liga, final matchday:
    - (4) Atlético Madrid 3–0 (10) Almería
    - (5) Valencia 2–0 (13) Athletic Bilbao
    - (9) Mallorca 2–3 (6) Villarreal
    - (7) Deportivo 1–1 (1) **Barcelona**
      - Standings: **Barcelona** 87 points, Real Madrid 78, Sevilla & Atlético Madrid 67, Villarreal 65, Valencia 62, Deportivo 58.
      - Atlético clinch a berth in the Champions League play-off round. Villarreal and Valencia qualify for the Europa League, together with Cup finalist Bilbao.
  - (Turkey) Turkish Süper Lig, final matchday:
    - (14) Denizlispor 1–2 (1) **Beşiktaş**
    - (5) Galatasaray 2–1 (2) Sivasspor
    - (3) Trabzonspor 1–2 (4) Fenerbahçe
      - Final standings: **Beşiktaş** 71 points, Sivasspor 66, Trabzonspor 65, Fenerbahçe & Galatasaray 61.
      - Beşiktaş win the championship for the 20th time, completes a League and Cup double, and qualify for the Champions League group stage. Sivasspor finish as runner-up and qualify for the Champions League for the first time in their history. Trabzonspor, Fenerbahçe & Galatasaray qualify for the Europa League.

==== Ice hockey ====
- Stanley Cup Finals: (seeding in parentheses)
  - Game 1 in Detroit: (W2) Detroit Red Wings 3, (E4) Pittsburgh Penguins 1. **Red Wings lead series 1–0.**

==== Rugby union ====
- Mid-year test series:
  - Canada 23–32 Wales in Toronto
  - England 26–33 Barbarians in London
- Lions tour of South Africa:
  - Royal XV 25–37 British & Irish Lions in Rustenburg
- Super 14 Final in Pretoria:
  - **Bulls** (South Africa) 61–17 (New Zealand) Chiefs
- Pacific Cup Final in Apia
  - Upolu Samoa 7–19 **Fiji Warriors**
    - The Warriors become the first Fijian team to win the competition.
- 2009–10 Heineken Cup qualification playoff in Calvisano, Italy:
  - Calvisano (Italy) 17–42 (Wales) **Newport Gwent Dragons**
    - The Dragons run in six tries to claim the 24th and final spot in next season's top European club competition.
- Sevens World Series:
  - Scotland Sevens in Edinburgh:
    - South Africa advance to the quarterfinals of the Cup competition and secure at least 8th place, thereby assuring them of the season title.

==== Tennis ====
- French Open in Paris, day 7: (seeding in parentheses)
  - Men's singles, third round:
    - Roger Federer (Switzerland) [2] bt Paul-Henri Mathieu (France) [32] 4–6, 6–1, 6–4, 6–4
    - Philipp Kohlschreiber (Germany) [29] bt Novak Djokovic (Serbia) [4] 6–4, 6–4, 6–4
    - Juan Martín del Potro (Argentina) [5] bt Igor Andreev (Russia) [25] 6–4, 7–5, 6–4
    - Andy Roddick (United States) [6] v.bt Marc Gicquel (France) 6–1, 6–4, 6–4
    - Jo-Wilfried Tsonga (France) [9] bt Christophe Rochus (Belgium) 6–2, 6–2, 6–2
  - Women's singles, third round:
    - Serena Williams (United States) [2] bt María José Martínez Sánchez (Spain) 4–6, 6–3, 6–4
    - Samantha Stosur (Australia) [30] bt Elena Dementieva (Russia) [4] 6–3, 4–6, 6–1
    - Jelena Janković (Serbia) [5] bt Jarmila Groth (Australia) 6–1, 6–1
    - Svetlana Kuznetsova (Russia) [7] bt Melinda Czink (Hungary) 6–1, 6–3
    - Victoria Azarenka (Belarus) [9] bt Carla Suárez Navarro (Spain) [22] 5–7, 7–5, 6–2
    - Sorana Cîrstea (Romania) bt Caroline Wozniacki (Denmark) [10] 7–6 (7/3), 7–5

=== May 29, 2009 (Friday) ===
==== Baseball ====
- Major League Baseball
  - The Colorado Rockies fire manager Clint Hurdle, who led the team to the 2007 World Series, and name Jim Tracy interim manager.

==== Basketball ====
- NBA playoffs (seeding in parentheses):
  - Western Conference Finals:
    - Game 6 in Denver: (1) Los Angeles Lakers 119, (2) Denver Nuggets 92. **Lakers win series 4–2.**
      - Kobe Bryant scores 35 points to lead the Lakers to the Finals for the second straight year and a record 30th time.

==== Cricket ====
- ICC World Twenty20 in England:
  - Warm-up match:
    - Scotland 141/7 (20/20 ov); Bangladesh 142/4 (18.4/20 ov) in Sir Paul Getty's Ground, Wormsley. Bangladesh win by 6 wickets.

==== Cycling ====
- Giro d'Italia:
  - Stage 19: (1) Carlos Sastre (Spain) (Cervélo TestTeam) 4h 33' 23" (2) Franco Pellizotti (Italy) (Liquigas) + 21" (3) Danilo Di Luca (Italy) (LPR Brakes–Farnese Vini) + 30"
    - General classification: (1) Denis Menchov (Russia) (Rabobank) 81h 13' 55" (2) Di Luca + 18" (3) Pellizotti + 1' 39"

==== Football (soccer) ====
- The four football associations within the United Kingdom reach an agreement that would enable the participation of UK men's and women's teams at the 2012 Summer Olympics. Under this agreement, the football associations of Scotland, Wales, and Northern Ireland will not object to The Football Association of England organising both teams using only English players. (BBC)

==== Horse racing ====
- Jess Jackson, owner of Preakness winner Rachel Alexandra, announces that the star filly will not run in the final leg of the U.S. Triple Crown, the Belmont Stakes. (Daily Racing Form via ESPN)

==== Tennis ====
- French Open in Paris, day 6: (seeding in parentheses)
  - Men's singles, second round:
    - Novak Djokovic (Serbia) [4] bt Sergiy Stakhovsky (Ukraine) 6–3, 6–4, 6–1
  - Men's singles, third round:
    - Rafael Nadal (Spain) [1] bt Lleyton Hewitt (Australia) 6–1, 6–3, 6–1
    - Andy Murray (United Kingdom) [3] bt Janko Tipsarević (Serbia) 7–6 (7/3), 6–3 – retired
    - Victor Hănescu (Romania) [30] bt Gilles Simon (France) [7] 6–4, 6–4, 6–2
    - Fernando Verdasco (Spain) [8] bt Nicolás Almagro (Spain) [31] 6–2, 7–6 (7/4), 7–6 (10/8)
    - Nikolay Davydenko (Russia) [10] bt Stanislas Wawrinka (Switzerland) [17] 6–3, 4–6, 6–3, 6–2
  - Women's singles, third round:
    - Dinara Safina (Russia) [1] bt Anastasia Pavlyuchenkova (Russia) [27] 6–2, 6–0
    - Ágnes Szávay (Hungary) [29] bt Venus Williams (United States) [3] 6–0, 6–4
    - Ana Ivanovic (Serbia) [8] bt Iveta Benešová (Czech Republic) [32] 6–0, 6–2
    - Victoria Azarenka (Belarus) [9] v. Carla Suárez Navarro (Spain) [22] 5–7 7–5 (suspended)
    - Maria Sharapova (Russia) bt Yaroslava Shvedova (Kazakhstan) 1–6, 6–3, 6–4

=== May 28, 2009 (Thursday) ===
==== Basketball ====
- NBA playoffs (seeding in parentheses):
  - Eastern Conference Finals:
    - Game 5 in Cleveland: (1) Cleveland Cavaliers 112, (3) Orlando Magic 102. **Magic lead series 3–2.**
      - LeBron James has 37 points, 14 rebounds and 12 assists, and Mo Williams adds 24 points to keep the Cavs alive in the series. James' figures are the highest in the playoffs since Oscar Robertson in 1963.
- (Greece) A1 Ethniki Playoff Final:
  - Game 3: Olympiacos Piraeus 74–70 Panathinaikos. **Panathinaikos lead best-of-5 series 2–1.**

==== Cricket ====
- ICC World Twenty20 in England:
  - Warm-up matches:
    - Ireland 139/9 (20/20 ov); PCA Masters XI 140/4 (19.2/20 ov) in Sir Paul Getty's Ground, Wormsley. PCA Masters XI win by 6 wickets.
    - West Indies 143/6 (20/20 ov); Scotland 129/9 (20/20 ov) in Sir Paul Getty's Ground, Wormsley. West Indies win by 14 runs.
    - Bangladesh 206/6 (20/20 ov); Netherlands 142 (17/20 ov) in Canterbury. Bangladesh win by 64 runs.

==== Cycling ====
- Giro d'Italia:
  - Stage 18: (1) Michele Scarponi (Italy) (Diquigiovanni–Androni) 4h 07' 41" (2) Félix Cárdenas (Colombia) (Barloworld) + 0" (3) Danny Pate (United States) (Garmin–Slipstream) + 0"
    - General classification: (1) Denis Menchov (Russia) (Rabobank) 76h 40' 02" (2) Danilo Di Luca (Italy) (LPR Brakes–Farnese Vini) + 26" (3) Franco Pellizotti (Italy) (Liquigas) + 2' 00"

==== Football (soccer) ====
- Copa Libertadores Quarterfinals, first leg:
  - Palmeiras (Brazil) 1–1 (Uruguay) Nacional
  - Defensor Sporting (Uruguay) 0–1 (Argentina) Estudiantes
- European domestic (national) competitions: (teams that win titles in **bold**)
  - (Croatia) Croatian Cup Final, second leg: (first leg result in parentheses)
    - Hajduk Split 3–0 (0–3) **Dinamo Zagreb**. Aggregate score 3–3, Dinamo win 4–3 in penalty shootout.
      - Dinamo Zagreb win the Croatian Cup for the 10th time in their history and complete a League and Cup double for the 3rd successive year.

==== Shooting ====
- ISSF World Cup in Milan, Italy: (Qualification scores in parentheses)
  - Men's 50 metre pistol: (gold) Shi Xinglong (China) 661.6 (571) (silver) Rashid Yunusmetov (Kazakhstan) 659.6 (563) (bronze) Serhiy Kudriya (Ukraine) 652.4 (558)
  - Men's 50 metre rifle prone: (gold) Warren Potent (Australia) 702.4 (598) (silver) Vebjørn Berg (Norway) 701.7 (596) (bronze) Marco De Nicolo (Italy) 699.3 (597)

==== Tennis ====
- French Open in Paris, day 5: (seeding in parentheses)
  - Men's singles, second round:
    - Roger Federer (Switzerland) [2] bt José Acasuso (Argentina) 7–6 (10/8), 5–7, 7–6 (7/2), 6–2
    - Novak Djokovic (Serbia) [4] vs. Sergiy Stakhovsky (Ukraine) 6–3, 6–4 (suspended)
    - Juan Martín del Potro (Argentina) [5] bt Viktor Troicki (Serbia) 6–3, 7–5, 6–0
    - Andy Roddick (United States) [6] bt Ivo Minář (Czech Republic) 6–2, 6–2, 7–6 (7/2)
    - Jo-Wilfried Tsonga (France) [9] bt Juan Mónaco (Argentina) 7–5, 2–6, 6–1, 7–6 (10/8)
    - Nikolay Davydenko (Russia) [10] bt Diego Junqueira (Argentina) 4–6, 6–3, 6–0, 6–2
  - Women's singles, second round:
    - Serena Williams (United States) [2] bt Virginia Ruano Pascual (Spain) 6–2, 6–0
    - Venus Williams (United States) [3] bt Lucie Šafářová (Czech Republic) 6–7 (5/7), 6–2, 7–5
    - Elena Dementieva (Russia) [4] bt Jelena Dokić (Australia) 2–6, 4–3 (retired)
    - Jelena Janković (Serbia) [5] bt Magdaléna Rybáriková (Slovakia) 6–1, 6–2
    - Svetlana Kuznetsova (Russia) [7] bt Galina Voskoboeva (Kazakhstan) 6–0, 6–2
    - Caroline Wozniacki (Denmark) [10] bt Jill Craybas (United States) 6–1, 6–4

=== May 27, 2009 (Wednesday) ===
==== Basketball ====
- NBA playoffs (seeding in parentheses):
  - Western Conference Finals:
    - Game 5 in Los Angeles: (1) Los Angeles Lakers 103, (2) Denver Nuggets 94. **Lakers lead series 3–2.**
- College basketball news:
  - The Commercial Appeal of Memphis, Tennessee reports that the NCAA has accused the University of Memphis men's basketball program of major violations during the 2007–08 season, the most serious of which involves allegations that current Chicago Bulls star Derrick Rose, who starred on that season's losing NCAA finalists, cheated on the SAT exam that qualified him to attend Memphis. (ESPN)

==== Cricket ====
- ICC World Twenty20 in England:
  - Warm-up match:
    - Ireland 152/5 (20/20 ov); New Zealand 153/3 (17/20 ov) in Derby. New Zealand win by 7 wickets.

==== Cycling ====
- Giro d'Italia:
  - Stage 17: (1) Franco Pellizotti (Italy) (Liquigas) 2h 21' 06" (2) Stefano Garzelli (Italy) (Acqua & Sapone–Caffè Mokambo) + 42" (3) Danilo Di Luca (Italy) (LPR Brakes–Farnese Vini) + 43"
    - General classification: (1) Denis Menchov (Russia) (Rabobank) 72h 28' 24" (2) Di Luca + 26" (3) Pellizotti + 2' 00"

==== Football (soccer) ====
- UEFA Champions League Final in Rome:
  - **Barcelona** (Spain) 2–0 (England) Manchester United
    - Goals by Samuel Eto'o and Lionel Messi give Barça their third European Cup in history, and complete a treble of trophies this season with the Spanish League and Cup. United fails to become the first team to retain the Cup since Milan in 1990.
- Copa Libertadores Quarterfinals, first leg:
  - Cruzeiro (Brazil) 2–1 (Brazil) São Paulo
  - Caracas (Venezuela) 1–1 (Brazil) Grêmio
- AFC Champions League Round of 16, West Asia:
  - Persepolis (Iran) 0–1 (Uzbekistan) Bunyodkor
    - Brazilian star Rivaldo scores from the penalty spot to put Bunyodkor into the semifinals.
  - Al-Ettifaq (Saudi Arabia) 1–2 (Uzbekistan) Pakhtakor Tashkent
    - Alexander Geynrikh scores the winning goal for Pakhtakor in injury time.
  - Al-Ittihad (Saudi Arabia) 2–1 (Saudi Arabia) Al-Shabab
    - Hicham Aboucherouane scores Al-Ittihad's winning goal in the 90th minute.
- European domestic (national) competitions: (teams that win titles in **bold**)
  - Czech Republic Cup Final in Prague:
    - Slovácko 0–1 **Teplice**
      - Teplice win the Cup for the second time, and qualify for Europa League.

==== Ice hockey ====
- Stanley Cup playoffs (seeding in parentheses):
  - Western Conference Finals:
    - Game 5 in Detroit: (2) Detroit Red Wings 2, (4) Chicago Blackhawks 1 (OT). **Red Wings win series 4–1.**
      - The Red Wings will meet the Pittsburgh Penguins in a rematch of last year Finals.

==== Shooting ====
- ISSF World Cup in Milan, Italy: (Qualification scores in parentheses)
  - Men's 25 metre rapid fire pistol: (gold) Taras Magmet (Ukraine) 784.6 (584) (silver) Zhang Jian (China) 781.1 (588) (bronze) Christian Reitz (Germany) 780.0 (582)

==== Tennis ====
- French Open in Paris, day 4: (seeding in parentheses)
  - Men's singles, second round:
    - Rafael Nadal (Spain) [1] bt Teymuraz Gabashvili (Russia) 6–1, 6–4, 6–2
    - Andy Murray (United Kingdom) [3] bt Potito Starace (Italy) 6–3, 2–6, 7–5, 6–4
    - Gilles Simon (France) [7] bt Robert Kendrick (United States) 7–5, 6–0, 6–1
    - Fernando Verdasco (Spain) [8] bt Philipp Petzschner (Germany) 6–1, 6–2, 6–3
    - Nikolay Davydenko (Russia) [10] v. Diego Junqueira (Argentina) 4–6, 6–3, 6–0, 2–2 (suspended)
  - Women's singles, second round:
    - Dinara Safina (Russia) [1] bt Vitalia Diatchenko (Russia) 6–1, 6–1
    - Lucie Šafářová (Czech Republic) v. Venus Williams (United States) [3] 7–6 (5) (suspended)
    - Ana Ivanovic (Serbia) [8] bt Tamarine Tanasugarn (Thailand) 6–1, 6–2
    - Victoria Azarenka (Belarus) [9] v.bt Kristina Barrois (Germany) 7–6 (1), 7–5
    - Maria Sharapova (Russia) bt Nadia Petrova (Russia) [11] 6–2, 1–6, 8–6

=== May 26, 2009 (Tuesday) ===
==== Basketball ====
- NBA playoffs (seeding in parentheses):
  - Eastern Conference Finals:
    - Game 4 in Orlando: (3) Orlando Magic 116, (1) Cleveland Cavaliers 114 (OT). **Magic lead series 3–1.**

==== Cricket ====
- West Indies in England:
  - 3rd ODI in Birmingham:
    - England 328/7 (50 ov); West Indies 270 (49.4 ov). **England win by 58 runs and win 3-match series 2–0**.
- ICC World Twenty20 in England:
  - Warm-up match:
    - Bangladesh 146/6 (20/20 ov); New Zealand 147/6 (20/20 ov) in Sir Paul Getty's Ground, Wormsley. New Zealand win by 4 wickets.

==== Football (soccer) ====
- AFC Champions League Round of 16, West Asia:
  - Al-Hilal (Saudi Arabia) 0–0 (ET) (Qatar) **Umm-Salal**. Umm-Salal win 4–3 in penalty shootout.
- European domestic (national) competitions: (listed by countries' alphabetic order; teams that win titles in **bold**)
  - (Bulgaria) Bulgarian Cup Final in Sofia
    - Pirin Blagoevgrad 0–3 **Litex Lovech**
      - Litex Lovech win the Cup for the second straight year and fourth time in their history, and qualify for Europa League.
  - (Hungary) Hungarian Cup Final, second leg: (first leg result in parentheses)
    - **Budapest Honvéd** 0–0 (1–0) Győri ETO. Honvéd win 1–0 on aggregate.
      - Honvéd win the Cup for the 7th time, and qualify for Europa League.
  - Israel State Cup Final in Ramat Gan:
    - **Beitar Jerusalem** 2–1 Maccabi Haifa
      - Cristian Álvarez and Aviram Baruchyan score in the first half to give Beitar the Cup for the second straight year and the 7th time in their history. However, Beitar is ineligible to participate in the Europa League.

==== Ice hockey ====
- Stanley Cup playoffs (seeding in parentheses):
  - Eastern Conference Finals:
    - Game 4 in Raleigh: (4) Pittsburgh Penguins 4, (6) Carolina Hurricanes 1. **Penguins win series 4–0.**

==== Shooting ====
- ISSF World Cup in Milan, Italy: (Qualification scores in parentheses)
  - Women's 50 metre rifle three positions: (gold) Sonja Pfeilschifter (Germany) 686.9 (585) (silver) Lidija Mihajlović (Serbia) 685.3 (587) (bronze) Wan Xiangyan (China) 684.1 (585)
  - Women's 25 metre pistol: (gold) Munkhbayar Dorjsuren (Germany) 789.9 (589) (silver) Yuan Jing (China) 789.4 (584) (bronze) Lalita Yauhleuskaya (Australia) 785.2 (580)

==== Tennis ====
- French Open in Paris, day 3: (seeding in parentheses)
  - Men's singles, first round:
    - Novak Djokovic (Serbia) [4] bt Nicolás Lapentti (Ecuador) 6–3, 3–1 (Lapentti retires)
    - Juan Martín del Potro (Argentina) [5] bt Michaël Llodra (France) 6–3, 6–3, 6–1
    - Jo-Wilfried Tsonga (France) [9] bt Julien Benneteau (France) 6–4, 3–6, 6–3, 6–4
  - Women's singles, first round:
    - Serena Williams (United States) [2] bt Klára Zakopalová (Czech Republic) 6–3, 6–7(5), 6–4
    - Elena Dementieva (Russia) [4] bt Chanelle Scheepers (South Africa) 6–4, 6–3
    - Jelena Janković (Serbia) [5] bt Petra Cetkovská (Czech Republic) 6–2, 6–3
    - Svetlana Kuznetsova (Russia) [7] bt Claire Feuerstein (France) 6–1, 6–4
    - Caroline Wozniacki (Denmark) [10] bt Vera Dushevina (Russia) 4–6, 7–5, 6–1

=== May 25, 2009 (Monday) ===
==== Auto racing ====
- Sprint Cup Series:
  - Coca-Cola 600 in Concord, North Carolina: (1) David Reutimann (Florida) (Michael Waltrip Racing) (2) Ryan Newman (Indiana) (Stewart Haas Racing) (3) Robby Gordon (California) (Robby Gordon Motorsports)
    - Drivers standings (after 12 of 26 races leading into the Chase for the Sprint Cup): (1) Jeff Gordon (California) (Hendrick Motorsports) 1722 points (2) Tony Stewart (Indiana) (Stewart Haas Racing) 1678 (3) Kurt Busch (Nevada) (Penske Racing) 1598
      - After being postponed from May 24 due to rain, the race was called after 227 of the scheduled 400 laps due to persistent rain, giving Reutimann his first NSCS win.

==== Basketball ====
- NBA playoffs (seeding in parentheses):
  - Western Conference Finals:
    - Game 4 in Denver: (2) Denver Nuggets 120, (1) Los Angeles Lakers 101. **Series tied 2–2.**
      - Seven Nuggets players score in double figures, led by Chauncey Billups and J. R. Smith with 24, and three have at least 13 rebounds, the most in a playoff game for 15 years, to compensate for an off night by Carmelo Anthony, who suffers from a stomach virus and sprained ankle and receives an IV at half-time.Kobe Bryant scores 34 for the Lakers.
- (Russia) Russian Super League Playoff Final:
  - Game 4: Khimky Moscow Region 45–78 CSKA Moscow. **CSKA win best-of-5 series 3–1.**
- (Greece) A1 Ethniki Playoff Final:
  - Game 2: Panathinaikos 91–64 Olympiacos Piraeus. **Panathinaikos lead best-of-5 series 2–0.**

==== Cycling ====
- Giro d'Italia:
  - Stage 16: (1) Carlos Sastre (Spain) (Cervélo TestTeam) 7h 11' 54" (2) Denis Menchov (Russia) (Rabobank) + 25" (3) Danilo Di Luca (Italy) (LPR Brakes–Farnese Vini) + 26"
    - General classification: (1) Menchov 70h 06' 30" (2) Di Luca + 39" (3) Sastre + 2' 19"

==== Darts ====
- Professional Darts Corporation:
  - Premier League Final in Wembley, London: (best-of-25 legs; seeding in parentheses)
    - James Wade (England) [2] beat Mervyn King (England) [4] 13–8
      - Wade becomes only the second player to win the tournament, after King had earlier dethroned four-time reigning champion Phil Taylor in the semi-finals.

==== Football (soccer) ====
- European domestic (national) competitions:
  - (England) Football League Championship play-off final in Wembley, London:
    - Burnley 1–0 Sheffield United
      - Burnley win promotion to the Premier League for the first time in 33 years, and join Wolves and Birmingham who won automatic promotion.

==== Lacrosse ====
- NCAA Men's Championship Final Four in Foxborough, Massachusetts: (Seeding in parentheses)
  - Final:
    - (2) Syracuse 10, (5) Cornell 9 (OT)

==== Shooting ====
- ISSF World Cup in Milan, Italy: (Qualification scores in parentheses)
  - Men's 50 metre rifle three positions: (gold) He Zhaohui (China) 1284.8 (1181) (silver) Niccolò Campriani (Italy) 1269.6 (1173) (bronze) Anders Johanson (Sweden) 1268.5 (1172)

==== Tennis ====
- French Open in Paris, day 2: (seeding in parentheses)
  - Men's singles, first round:
    - Rafael Nadal (Spain) [1] bt Marcos Daniel (Brazil) 7–5, 6–4, 6–3
    - Roger Federer (Switzerland) [2] bt Alberto Martín (Spain) 6–4, 6–3, 6–2
    - Andy Roddick (United States) [6] bt Romain Jouan (France) 6–2, 6–4, 6–2
    - Nikolay Davydenko (Russia) [10] bt Stefan Koubek (Austria) 6–2, 6–1, 6–4
  - Women's singles, first round:
    - Dinara Safina (Russia) [1] bt Anne Keothavong (United Kingdom) 6–0, 6–0
    - Venus Williams (United States) [3] bt Bethanie Mattek-Sands (United States) 6–1, 4–6, 6–2
    - Maria Sharapova (Russia) bt Anastasiya Yakimova (Belarus) 3–6, 6–1, 6–2
    - Vera Dushevina (Russia) v. Caroline Wozniacki (Denmark) [10] 6–4, 5–7 (match postponed due to bad light)

=== May 24, 2009 (Sunday) ===
==== Auto racing ====
- Formula One:
  - Monaco Grand Prix in Monte Carlo, Monaco: (1) Jenson Button (United Kingdom) (Brawn–Mercedes) (2) Rubens Barrichello (Brazil) (Brawn-Mercedes) (3) Kimi Räikkönen (Finland) (Ferrari)
    - Drivers standings (after 6 of 17 races): (1) Button 51 points (2) Barrichello 35 (3) Sebastian Vettel (Germany) (Red Bull–Renault) 23
- Sprint Cup Series:
  - Coca-Cola 600 in Concord, North Carolina: Postponed to May 25, due to rain.
- IndyCar Series:
  - Indianapolis 500 in Speedway, Indiana: (1) Hélio Castroneves (Brazil) (Penske Racing) (2) Dan Wheldon (United Kingdom) (Panther Racing) (3) Danica Patrick (United States) (Andretti Green Racing)
    - Drivers standings (after 4 of 17 races): (1) Dario Franchitti (United Kingdom) (Chip Ganassi Racing) 122 points (2) Castroneves 117 (3) Ryan Briscoe (Australia) (Penske Racing) 114
- World Rally Championship:
  - Rally d'Italia Sardegna: (1) Jari-Matti Latvala (Finland) (Ford Focus RS WRC 08) 4:00:55.7 (2) Mikko Hirvonen (Finland) (Ford Focus RS WRC 08) 4:01:25.1 (3) Petter Solberg (Norway) (Citroën Xsara WRC) 4:02:53.3
    - Drivers' Standings (after 6 of 12 rallies): (1) Sébastien Loeb (France) 55 points (2) Hirvonen 38 (3) Dani Sordo (Spain) 31

==== Basketball ====
- NBA playoffs (seeding in parentheses)
  - Eastern Conference Finals:
    - Game 3 in Orlando: (3) Orlando Magic 99, (1) Cleveland Cavaliers 89. **Magic lead series 2–1.**
- (Russia) Russian Super League Playoff Final:
  - Game 3: Khimky Moscow Region 67–66 CSKA Moscow. **CSKA lead best-of-5 series 2–1.**

==== Cricket ====
- West Indies in England:
  - 2nd ODI in Bristol:
    - West Indies 160 (38.3 ov); England 161/4 (36.0 ov). **England win by 6 wickets, lead 3-match series 1–0**.
- Indian Premier League final in Johannesburg:
  - Deccan Chargers 143/6 (20 ov); Royal Challengers Bangalore 137/9 (20 ov). **Deccan Chargers win by 6 runs.**

==== Cycling ====
- Giro d'Italia:
  - Stage 15: (1) Leonardo Bertagnolli (Italy) (Diquigiovanni–Androni) 4h 18' 34" (2) Serge Pauwels (Belgium) (Cervélo TestTeam) + 54" (3) Marco Pinotti (Italy) (Team Columbia–High Road) + 54"
    - General classification: (1) Denis Menchov (Russia) (Rabobank) 62h 54' 23" (2) Danilo Di Luca (Italy) (LPR Brakes–Farnese Vini) + 34" (3) Levi Leipheimer (United States) (Astana) + 40"
- UCI ProTour:
  - Volta a Catalunya:
    - Stage 7: (1) Greg Henderson (New Zealand) (Team Columbia–High Road) 2h 26' 51" (2) Lloyd Mondory (France) (Ag2r–La Mondiale) + 0" (3) Fabio Sabatini (Italy) (Liquigas) + 0"
      - Final General classification: (1) Alejandro Valverde (Spain) (Caisse d'Epargne) 24h 12' 10" (2) Dan Martin (Republic of Ireland) (Garmin–Slipstream) + 15" (3) Haimar Zubeldia (Spain) (Astana) + 22"

==== Football (soccer) ====
- European domestic (national) competitions: (listed by countries' alphabetic order; league standings prior to match in parentheses; teams that win titles in **bold**; teams that qualify to the Champions League in italics)
  - Austrian Cup Final in Mattersburg:
    - Trenkwalder Admira 1–3 (ET) **Austria Vienna**
      - Austria Vienna win the Cup for the 27th time, and qualify for Europa League.
  - (Belgium) Belgian First Division Championship Playoff, second leg: (first leg result in parentheses)
    - **Standard Liège** 1–0 (1–1) Anderlecht. Standard win 2–1 on aggregate.
      - Standard win the championship for the 2nd straight year and 10th in their history, and qualify for the Champions League group stage. Anderlecht will enter the Champions League at the 3rd qualifying round.
  - (Denmark) Danish Superliga, matchday 32 of 33:
    - **F.C. Copenhagen** win the championship, and qualify for the Champions League.
  - (England) English Premier League, final matchday:
    - (7) Fulham 0–2 (5) Everton
    - (2) Liverpool 3–1 (8) Tottenham
      - Final standings: **Manchester United** 90 points, Liverpool 86, Chelsea 83, Arsenal 72, Everton 63, Aston Villa 62, Fulham 53, Tottenham & West Ham 51.
      - Fulham clinch the last berth in the Europa League.
      - Middlesbrough, Newcastle and West Bromwich are relegated to the Football League Championship.
  - (Italy) Italian Serie A, matchday 33 of 34:
    - (9) Cagliari 2–1 (1) **Inter**
    - (2) Milan 2–3 (6) Roma
    - (14) Siena 0–3 (3) Juventus
    - (20) Lecce 1–1 (4) Fiorentina
    - (17) Torino 2–3 (5) Genoa
      - Standings: **Inter** 81 points, Juventus & Milan 71, Fiorentina 68, Genoa 65, Roma 60.
      - Juventus secure a berth in the Champions League group stage. Milan and Fiorentina also qualify for the Champions League. If Fiorentina beat Milan on May 31 they will clinch a spot in the group stage, otherwise Milan will go to the group stage. Genoa and Roma clinch berths in Europa League.
      - Lecce and Reggina are relegated to Serie B. The 3rd relegation berth will be determined next Sunday between Torino and Bologna.
  - (Romania) Romanian Liga I, matchday 32 of 34:
    - (2) Unirea Urziceni 1–0 (1) Dinamo București
      - Unirea goes to the top with 66 points, one ahead of Dinamo.
  - (Scotland) Scottish Premier League, final matchday:
    - (4) Dundee United 0–3 (1) **Rangers**
    - (2) Celtic 0–0 (3) Hearts
    - (5) Aberdeen 2–1 (6) Hibernian
      - Final standings: **Rangers** 86 points, Celtic 82, Hearts 59, Aberdeen 53 (goal difference +1), Dundee United 53 (−3), Hibernian 47.
      - Rangers win the championship for the 52nd time and qualify for the Champions League group stage. Celtic have to be content with second place and a berth in the Champions League third qualifying round. Aberdeen edge Dundee United by goal difference and qualify for the Europa League, together with Hearts and Falkirk, the Scottish Cup finalist.
  - (Switzerland) Swiss Super League, matchday 35 of 36:
    - **FC Zürich** win the championship, and qualify for the Champions League.
  - (Turkey) Turkish Süper Lig, matchday 33 of 34:
    - (1) Beşiktaş 2–1 (4) Galatasaray
    - (2) Sivasspor 3–2 (12) Gençlerbirliği
    - (10) Eskişehirspor 2–5 (3) Trabzonspor
      - Standings: Beşiktaş 68 points, Sivasspor 66, Trabzonspor 65.

==== Golf ====
- Senior majors:
  - Senior PGA Championship in Beachwood, Ohio:
    - Winner: Michael Allen (USA) 274 (−6)
      - Allen, who defeats Larry Mize (USA) by two shots, becomes only the fourth golfer ever, and the first since Jack Nicklaus in 1990, to win a major on his Champions Tour debut.
- PGA Tour:
  - HP Byron Nelson Championship in Irving, Texas:
    - Winner: Rory Sabbatini (RSA) 261 (−19)
- European Tour:
  - BMW PGA Championship in Wentworth, England:
    - Winner: Paul Casey (ENG) 271 (−17)
      - Casey birdies the last two holes to finish one shot ahead of Ross Fisher (ENG), and moves to a career-high #3 world ranking.
- LPGA Tour:
  - LPGA Corning Classic in Corning, New York:
    - Winner: Yani Tseng (TWN) 267 (−21)
      - Tseng finishes one shot ahead of Kang Soo-yun (KOR) and Paula Creamer (USA) and becomes the youngest LPGA golfer with US$2 million in career earnings.

==== Ice hockey ====
- Stanley Cup playoffs: (Seeding in parentheses, All times ET)
  - Western Conference Finals:
    - Game 4 in Chicago: (2) Detroit Red Wings 6, (4) Chicago Blackhawks 1. **Red Wings lead series 3–1**.

==== Rugby union ====
- Sevens World Series:
  - London Sevens in London
    - Final: New Zealand 26–31 (AET) England
      - Standings after 7 of 8 events: (1) South Africa 116 points (2) England 96 (3) Fiji 82
        - South Africa will clinch the season crown unless they place outside the top 9 teams in the season-ending Edinburgh Sevens next weekend and England win the tournament.

==== Shooting ====
- ISSF World Cup in Milan, Italy: (Qualification scores in parentheses)
  - Women's 10 metre air pistol: (gold) Guo Wenjun (China) 489.9 (392) (silver) Hu Jun (China) 488.6 (388) (bronze) Mirosława Sagun-Lewandowska (Poland) 486.0 (385)
  - Men's 10 metre air pistol: (gold) Lukas Grunder (Switzerland) 691.1 (588 **EJWR**) (silver) Serhiy Kudriya (Ukraine) 682.2 (583) (bronze) Denis Kulakov (Russia) 680.6 (582)

==== Tennis ====
- French Open in Paris, day 1: (seeding in parentheses)
  - Men's singles, first round:
    - Andy Murray (United Kingdom) (3) bt Juan Ignacio Chela (Argentina) 6–2, 6–2, 6–1
    - Gilles Simon (France) (7) bt Wayne Odesnik (United States) 3–6, 7–5, 6–2, 4–6, 6–3
    - Fernando Verdasco (Spain) (8) bt Florent Serra (France) 6–2, 6–1, 6–4
  - Women's singles, first round:
    - Ana Ivanovic (Serbia) (8) bt Sara Errani (Italy) 7–6 (7/3), 6–3
    - Victoria Azarenka (Belarus) (9) bt Roberta Vinci (Italy) 6–4, 6–2

=== May 23, 2009 (Saturday) ===
==== Auto racing ====
- Nationwide Series:
  - CarQuest Auto Parts 300 in Concord, North Carolina:
    - (1) Mike Bliss (Oregon) (Phoenix Racing) (2) Brendan Gaughan (Nevada) (Rusty Wallace, Inc.) (3) Kyle Busch (Nevada) (Joe Gibbs Racing)

==== Basketball ====
- NBA playoffs (seeding in parentheses):
  - Western Conference Finals:
    - Game 3 in Denver: (1) Los Angeles Lakers 103, (2) Denver Nuggets 97. **Lakers lead series 2–1.**
- 2014 FIBA World Championship:
  - The hosting rights were awarded to Spain after the FIBA Central Board voted in Chicago. Other countries in the running were Italy and China.

==== Cycling ====
- Giro d'Italia:
  - Stage 14: (1) Simon Gerrans (Australia) (Cervélo TestTeam) 4h 16' 48" (2) Rubens Bertogliati (Switzerland) (Diquigiovanni–Androni) + 12" (3) Francesco Gavazzi (Italy) (Lampre–NGC) + 18"
    - General classification: (1) Denis Menchov (Russia) (Rabobank) 58h 33' 53" (2) Danilo Di Luca (Italy) (LPR Brakes–Farnese Vini) + 34" (3) Levi Leipheimer (United States) (Astana) + 43"
- UCI ProTour:
  - Volta a Catalunya:
    - Stage 6: (1) Thor Hushovd (Norway) (Cervélo TestTeam) 3h 26' 43" (2) Fabio Sabatini (Italy) (Liquigas) + 0" (3) Greg Henderson (New Zealand) (Team Columbia–High Road) + 0"
      - General classification: (1) Alejandro Valverde (Spain) (Caisse d'Epargne) 21h 45' 19" (2) Dan Martin (Republic of Ireland) (Garmin–Slipstream) + 15" (3) Haimar Zubeldia (Spain) (Astana) + 22"

==== Football (soccer) ====
- European domestic (national) competitions: (listed by countries' alphabetic order; league standings prior to match in parentheses; teams that win titles in **bold**; teams that qualify to the Champions League in italics)
  - (Belgium) Belgian Cup Final in Brussels:
    - Mechelen 0–2 **Genk**
      - Genk win the Cup for the third time, and qualify for Europa League.
  - (France) French Ligue 1, matchday 37 of 38:
    - (1) Bordeaux 1–0 (11) AS Monaco
    - (13) Nancy 1–2 (2) Marseille
    - (3) Lyon 3–1 (16) Caen
    - (14) Valenciennes 2–1 (4) Paris Saint-Germain
      - Bordeaux lead by 3 points over Marseille with one match remaining, and will win the title unless they lose and Marseille win. Both teams qualify to the Champions League group stage, while Lyon secure 3rd place and will enter the Champions League at the play off stage.
  - (Germany) German Bundesliga, final matchday:
    - (1) **Wolfsburg** 5–1 (10) Werder Bremen
    - (2) Bayern Munich 2–1 (3) Stuttgart
    - (18) Karlsruhe 4–0 (4) Hertha Berlin
    - (15) Mönchengladbach 1–1 (5) Dortmund
    - (13) Frankfurt 2–3 (6) Hamburg
      - Final standings: **Wolfsburg** 69 points, Bayern 67, Stuttgart 64, Hertha 63, Hamburg 61, Dortmund 59.
      - Wolfsburg win their first-ever Bundesliga crown. Bayern claims second place and also qualify to the Champions League group stage. Hertha's demolition by relegated Karlsruhe sends Stuttgart to the Champions League play-off round while Hertha go into the Europa League. Hamburg pips Dortmund for the final Europa League berth with a 90th minute winning goal by Piotr Trochowski.
  - (Israel) Israeli Premier League, matchday 32 of 33:
    - Maccabi Netanya 0–2 **Maccabi Haifa**
      - Haifa secure their 11th championship, and qualify to the Champions League.
  - (Spain) Spanish La Liga, matchday 37 of 38:
    - (1) **Barcelona** 0–1 (18) Osasuna
    - (3) Sevilla 1–0 (7) Deportivo La Coruña
    - (11) Athletic Bilbao 1–4 (4) Atlético Madrid
    - (6) Villarreal 3–1 (5) Valencia
      - Diego Perotti's goal in the 90th minute secures 3rd place for Sevilla and a berth in the Champions League group stage, alongside Barcelona and Real Madrid. Atlético Madrid has 2 points lead over Villarreal in the battle for 4th place and a spot in the Champions League play off stage.

==== Ice hockey ====
- Stanley Cup playoffs (seeding in parentheses):
  - Eastern Conference Finals:
    - Game 3 in Raleigh: (4) Pittsburgh Penguins 6, (6) Carolina Hurricanes 2. **Penguins lead series 3–0.**

==== Lacrosse ====
- NCAA Men's Championship Final Four in Foxborough, Massachusetts (seeding in parentheses):
  - Semifinals:
    - (2) Syracuse 17, (3) Duke 7
    - (5) Cornell 15, (1) Virginia 6

==== Mixed martial arts ====
- UFC 98 in Las Vegas:
  - Light Heavyweight Championship bout:
    - (Brazil) Lyoto Machida def. (United States) Rashad Evans via KO (punch) at 3:57 of round 2 to become the new Light Heavyweight Champion.

==== Rugby union ====
- Heineken Cup Final in Edinburgh:
  - Leicester Tigers (England) 16–19 **Leinster**
- Super 14 semifinal in Pretoria:
  - Bulls (South Africa) 36–23 (New Zealand) Crusaders
- Mid-year test series:
  - Canada 6–25 Ireland in Vancouver
- 2011 Rugby World Cup – Europe qualification:
  - Israel 3–19 Lithuania
    - Lithuania will play against Netherlands in the next round on June 6.

==== Shooting ====
- ISSF World Cup in Milan, Italy: (Qualification scores in parentheses)
  - Men's 10 metre air rifle: (gold) Zhu Qinan (China) 699.1 (596) (silver) Artur Ayvazyan (Ukraine) 698.8 (596) (bronze) Henri Häkkinen (Finland) 697.6 (595)
  - Women's 10 metre air rifle: (gold) Sonja Pfeilschifter (Germany) 502.0 (399) (silver) Petra Zublasing (Italy) 501.5 (398) (bronze) Xie Jieqiong (China) 501.4 (398)

==== Tennis ====
- ATP Tour:
  - Hypo Group Tennis International in Pörtschach, Austria
    - Final: (Spain) **Guillermo García López** def. (France) Julien Benneteau, 3–6, 7–6(1), 6–3
- Garcia-Lopez wins his first ATP Tour title.
  - ARAG World Team Cup in Düsseldorf, Germany
    - Final: Serbia def. Germany 2–1
- WTA Tour:
  - Internationaux de Strasbourg in Strasbourg, France
    - Final: (France) **Aravane Rezaï** def. (Czech Republic) Lucie Hradecká, 7–6(2), 6–1
- Rezaï wins her first WTA Tour title.
  - Warsaw Open in Warsaw, Poland
    - Final: (Romania) **Alexandra Dulgheru** def. (Ukraine) Alona Bondarenko, 7–6(3), 3–6, 6–0
- Dulgheru also wins her first WTA Tour title.

=== May 22, 2009 (Friday) ===
==== Baseball ====
- Jake Peavy of the San Diego Padres refuses to be traded to the Chicago White Sox.

==== Basketball ====
- NBA playoffs (seeding in parentheses):
  - Eastern Conference Finals:
    - Game 2 in Cleveland: (1) Cleveland Cavaliers 96, (3) Orlando Magic 95. **Series tied 1–1.**
      - LeBron James scores a game-winning three-pointer at the buzzer to finish the game with 35 points, after the Magic rally from 23 points down in the second quarter to take a 2-point lead on a Hedo Türkoğlu jumper with 1 second left. The result makes this the first playoff series in NBA history in which the first two games are both decided by one point.

==== Cycling ====
- Giro d'Italia:
  - Stage 13: (1) Mark Cavendish (United Kingdom) (Team Columbia–High Road) 3h 48' 36" (2) Alessandro Petacchi (Italy) (LPR Brakes–Farnese Vini) + 0" (3) Allan Davis (Australia) (Quick-Step) + 0"
    - General classification: (1) Denis Menchov (Russia) (Rabobank) 54h 16' 01" (2) Danilo Di Luca (Italy) (LPR Brakes–Farnese Vini) + 34" (3) Levi Leipheimer (United States) (Astana) + 40"
- UCI ProTour:
  - Volta a Catalunya:
    - Stage 5: (1) Nikolay Trusov (Russia) (Team Katusha) 4h 28' 58" (2) Thor Hushovd (Norway) (Cervélo TestTeam) + 0" (3) Fabio Sabatini (Italy) (Liquigas) + 0"
      - General classification: (1) Alejandro Valverde (Spain) (Caisse d'Epargne) 18h 18' 36" (2) Dan Martin (Republic of Ireland) (Garmin–Slipstream) + 15" (3) Haimar Zubeldia (Spain) (Astana) + 22"

==== Football (soccer) ====
- UEFA Women's Cup Finals, second leg: (first leg result in parentheses)
  - Duisburg (Germany) 1–1 (6–0) (Russia) Zvezda Perm. Duisburg win 7–1 on aggregate.
    - Duisburg win the title for the first time.

==== Ice hockey ====
- Stanley Cup playoffs (seeding in parentheses):
  - Western Conference Finals:
    - Game 3 in Chicago: (4) Chicago Blackhawks 4, (2) Detroit Red Wings 3 (OT). **Red Wings lead series 2–1.**

==== Rugby union ====
- European Challenge Cup Final in London:
  - **Northampton Saints** (England) 15–3 (France) Bourgoin
    - The Saints earn a place in next season's Heineken Cup.
- Super 14 semifinal in Hamilton, New Zealand:
  - Chiefs (New Zealand) 14–10 (New Zealand) Hurricanes

=== May 21, 2009 (Thursday) ===
==== Basketball ====
- NBA playoffs (seeding in parentheses):
  - Western Conference Finals:
    - Game 2 in Los Angeles: (2) Denver Nuggets 106, (1) Los Angeles Lakers 103. **Series tied 1–1.**
      - The Nuggets beat the Lakers in the playoffs for the first time since 1985, breaking a streak of 11 successive losses. Carmelo Anthony scores 34 points for his fifth straight 30-points game, the first ever Nuggets player to do so.
- (Israel) Israeli Super League Final Four in Tel Aviv: (league standings in parentheses)
  - Final: (1) (1) Maccabi Tel Aviv 85–72 (2) (3) Maccabi Haifa Heat
    - Maccabi Tel Aviv win the championship for the 48th time, and the 38th in the last 40 years.
  - 3rd place playoff: (2) Hapoel Jerusalem 96–101 (3) (5) Hapoel Gilboa/Galil
- (Russia) Russian Super League Playoff Final:
  - Game 2: CSKA Moscow 76–64 Khimky Moscow Region. **CSKA lead best-of-5 series 2–0.**
- (Greece) A1 Ethniki Playoff Final:
  - Game 1: Olympiacos Piraeus 67–69 Panathinaikos. **Panathinaikos lead best-of-5 series 1–0.**

==== Cricket ====
- West Indies in England:
  - 1st ODI in Leeds:
    - Match abandoned without a ball bowled

==== Cycling ====
- Giro d'Italia:
  - Stage 12 (ITT): (1) Denis Menchov (Russia) (Rabobank) 1h 34' 29" (2) Levi Leipheimer (United States) (Astana) + 20" (3) Stefano Garzelli (Italy) (Acqua & Sapone–Caffè Mokambo) + 1' 03"
    - General classification: (1) Menchov 50h 27' 17" (2) Danilo Di Luca (Italy) (LPR Brakes–Farnese Vini) + 34" (3) Leipheimer + 40"
- UCI ProTour:
  - Volta a Catalunya:
    - Stage 4: (1) Julián Sánchez Pimienta (Spain) (Contentpolis–Ampo) 4h 46' 29" (2) Dan Martin (Republic of Ireland) (Garmin–Slipstream) + 6" (3) Alejandro Valverde (Spain) (Caisse d'Epargne) + 8"
      - General classification: (1) Valverde 13h 49' 48" (2) Martin + 15" (3) Haimar Zubeldia (Spain) (Astana) + 22"

==== Football (soccer) ====
- Copa Libertadores Round of 16, second leg: (first leg score in parentheses)
  - Boca Juniors (Argentina) 0–1 (2–2) (Uruguay) Defensor Sporting. Defensor Sporting win 3–2 on aggregate.
- Arab Champions League Final, second leg: (first leg score in parentheses)
  - Espérance Sportive de Tunis (Tunisia) 1–1 (1–0) (Morocco) Wydad Casablanca. Espérance Sportive de Tunis win 2–1 on aggregate.
    - Espérance Sportive win the trophy for the second time.
- Domestic (national) competitions: (listed by countries' alphabetic order; teams that win titles in **bold**)
  - (Belgium) Belgian First Division Championship Playoff, first leg:
    - Anderlecht 1–1 Standard Liège
  - (Denmark) Danish Cup Final in Copenhagen:
    - Aalborg 0–1 **Copenhagen**
      - Copenhagen win the Cup for the fourth time, and qualify for Europa League.
  - (Serbia) Serbian Cup Final in Belgrade:
    - **Partizan** 3–0 Sevojno
      - Partizan win the league and cup double for the second straight year.

==== Ice hockey ====
- Stanley Cup playoffs (seeding in parentheses):
  - Eastern Conference Finals:
    - Game 2 in Pittsburgh: (4) Pittsburgh Penguins 7, (6) Carolina Hurricanes 4. **Penguins lead series 2–0.**

=== May 20, 2009 (Wednesday) ===
==== Basketball ====
- NBA playoffs (seeding in parentheses):
  - Eastern Conference Finals:
    - Game 1 in Cleveland: (3) Orlando Magic 107, (1) Cleveland Cavaliers 106. **Magic lead series 1–0.**
      - Dwight Howard scores 30 points and Rashard Lewis adds 22, including the game-winning basket with 14.7 seconds left, as the Magic rally from a 15-point halftime deficit to hand the Cavaliers their first loss of the postseason, despite 49 points from LeBron James.
- Asia Champions Cup in Jakarta, Indonesia:
  - Final: (gold) **Mahram** 78–68 (silver) (Jordan) Zain
    - Mahram win the Cup for the first time, and extend Iran's winning streak to 3 years.
  - Bronze medal game: (bronze) **Al-Riyadi** (Lebanon) 94–81 (Qatar) Al-Arabi
  - 5th place playoff: **Smart Gilas** (Philippines) 112–107 (OT) (Indonesia) Satria Muda
  - 7th place playoff: **Sangmu** (South Korea) 72–61 (India) Young Cagers
- (Russia) Russian Super League Playoff Final:
  - Game 1: CSKA Moscow 80–74 Khimky Moscow Region. **CSKA lead best-of-5 series 1–0**.

==== Cycling ====
- Giro d'Italia:
  - Stage 11: (1) Mark Cavendish (United Kingdom) (Team Columbia–High Road) 4h 51' 17" (2) Tyler Farrar (United States) (Garmin–Slipstream) + 0" (3) Alessandro Petacchi (Italy) (LPR Brakes–Farnese Vini) + 0"
    - General classification: (1) Danilo Di Luca (Italy) (LPR Brakes–Farnese Vini) 48h 51' 28" (2) Denis Menchov (Russia) (Rabobank) + 1' 20" (3) Michael Rogers (Australia) (Team Columbia–High Road) + 1' 33
- UCI ProTour:
  - Volta a Catalunya:
    - Stage 3: (1) Alejandro Valverde (Spain) (Caisse d'Epargne) 4h 46' 53" (2) David de la Fuente (Spain) (Fuji–Servetto) + 0" (3) Dan Martin (Republic of Ireland) (Garmin–Slipstream) + 0"
      - General classification: (1) Valverde 9h 03' 05" (2) Haimar Zubeldia (Spain) (Astana) + 14" (3) Samuel Sánchez (Spain) (Euskaltel–Euskadi) + 15"

==== Football (soccer) ====
- UEFA Cup Final in Istanbul:
  - Werder Bremen (Germany) 1–2 (ET) **Shakhtar Donetsk**
    - Jádson scores in the 7th minute of extra time to give Shakhtar the last UEFA Cup, which will be replaced by Europa League next season. This is the first European trophy won by a team representing Ukraine.
- AFC Champions League group stage, matchday 6: (teams in **bold** advance to the round of 16)
  - Group A:
    - **Al-Hilal** (Saudi Arabia) 2–0 (Uzbekistan) **Pakhtakor Tashkent**
    - Al-Ahli (United Arab Emirates) 3–5 (Iran) Saba Battery
      - Final standings: Al-Hilal 14 points, Pakhtakor 13, Saba Battery 5, Al-Ahli 1.
  - Group B:
    - **Persepolis** (Iran) 1–0 (Saudi Arabia) **Al-Shabab**
      - Final standings: Persepolis & Al-Shabab 7 points, Al-Gharafa 3.
  - Group E:
    - Beijing Guoan (China) 1–1 (Japan) **Nagoya Grampus**
    - Ulsan Hyundai Horang-i (South Korea) 0–1 (Australia) **Newcastle United Jets**
      - Final standings: Nagoya 12 points, Newcastle 10, Ulsan 6, Beijing 5.
  - Group F:
    - **Gamba Osaka** (Japan) 1–2 (South Korea) **Seoul**
    - Sriwijaya (Indonesia) 4–2 (China) Shandong Luneng
      - Final standing: Osaka 15 points, Seoul 10, Shandong 7, Sriwujaya 3.
- European domestic (national) competitions: (listed by countries' alphabetic order; teams that win titles in **bold**)
  - (Hungary) Hungarian Cup Final, first leg:
    - Győri ETO 0–1 Budapest Honvéd
  - (Slovakia) Slovak Cup Final in Senec:
    - **Košice** 3–1 Artmedia Petržalka
      - Košice win the Cup for the 4th time in their history, and qualify for Europa League.
  - (Switzerland) Swiss Cup Final in Berne:
    - Young Boys 2–3 **Sion**
      - Sion rallies from 2 goals down to win the Cup for the 11th time, and qualify for Europa League.

==== Shooting ====
- ISSF World Cup in Munich, Germany: (Qualification scores in parentheses)
  - Women's 10 metre air pistol: (gold) Olena Kostevych (Ukraine) 489.4 (390) (silver) Tong Xin (China) 488.6 (385) (bronze) Lee Ho-lim (South Korea) 487.3 (388)
  - Men's 50 metre rifle three positions: (gold) He Zhaohui (China) 1283.5 (1182) (silver) Mario Knögler (Austria) 1276.7 (1178) (bronze) Matthew Emmons (United States) 1275.8 (1176)
  - Men's skeet: (gold) Jan Sychra (Czech Republic) 149 (125 **EWR**) (silver) Georgios Achilleos (Cyprus) 148+2 (123) (bronze) Valerio Luchini (Italy) 148+1 (123)
    - In the qualification round, Sychra equalled the world record with a perfect 125.

=== May 19, 2009 (Tuesday) ===
==== Basketball ====
- NBA draft Lottery in Secaucus, New Jersey:
  - (1) Los Angeles Clippers (2) Memphis Grizzlies (3) Oklahoma City Thunder
- NBA playoffs: (seeding in parentheses)
  - Western Conference Finals:
    - Game 1 in Los Angeles: (1) Los Angeles Lakers 105, (2) Denver Nuggets 103. **Lakers lead series 1–0.**
- Asia Champions Cup in Jakarta, Indonesia:
  - Semifinals:
    - **Mahram** (Iran) 109–80 (Lebanon) Al-Riyadi
    - **Zain** (Jordan) 113–57 (Qatar) Al-Arabi
  - Classification 5–8:
    - Sangmu (South Korea) 78–98 (Philippines) **Smart Gilas**
    - Young Cagers (India) 61–83 (Indonesia) **Satria Muda**
  - 9th place playoff:
    - Al-Qadsia (Kuwait) – (United Arab Emirates) AlWasl
- (Israel) Israeli Super League Final Four in Tel Aviv: (league standings in parentheses)
  - Semifinals:
    - (2) Hapoel Jerusalem 93–98 (OT) (3) **Maccabi Haifa Heat**
      - Maccabi Haifa advance to their first ever playoff final.
    - (1) **Maccabi Tel Aviv** 72–70 (5) Hapoel Gilboa/Galil

==== Cycling ====
- Giro d'Italia:
  - Stage 10: (1) Danilo Di Luca (Italy) (LPR Brakes–Farnese Vini) 6h 30' 43" (2) Franco Pellizotti (Italy) (Liquigas) + 10" (3) Denis Menchov (Russia) (Rabobank) + 10"
    - General classification: (1) Di Luca 44h 00' 11" (2) Menchov + 1' 20" (3) Michael Rogers (Australia) (Team Columbia–High Road) + 1' 33"
- UCI ProTour:
  - Volta a Catalunya:
    - Stage 2: (1) Matti Breschel (Denmark) (Team Saxo Bank) 4h 11' 34" (2) Jérôme Pineau (France) (Quick-Step) + 0" (3) Xavier Florencio (Spain) (Cervélo TestTeam) + 0"
      - General classification: (1) Alejandro Valverde (Spain) (Caisse d'Epargne) 4h 16' 22" (2) Pineau + 0" (3) Florencio + 1"

==== Football (soccer) ====
- AFC Champions League group stage, matchday 6: (teams in **bold** advance to the round of 16)
  - Group C:
    - **Al-Ittihad** (Saudi Arabia) 7–0 (Qatar) **Umm-Salal**
    - Al-Jazira (United Arab Emirates) 2–2 (Iran) Esteghlal
      - Final standings: Al-Ittihad 12 points, Umm-Salal 8, Al-Jazira 5, Esteghlal 4.
  - Group D:
    - Sepahan (Iran) 3–0 (Saudi Arabia) **Al-Ettifaq**
    - **Bunyodkor** (Uzbekistan) 0–0 (United Arab Emirates) Al-Shabab Al-Arabi
      - Final standings: Al-Ettifaq 12 points, Bunyodkor 8, Sepahan & Al-Shabab 7.
  - Group G:
    - **Suwon Bluewings** (South Korea) 3–1 Singapore Armed Forces
    - Shanghai Shenhua (China) 1–1 (Japan) **Kashima Antlers**
      - Final standings: Kashima 13 points, Suwon 12, Shanghai 8, Singapore AF 1.
  - Group H:
    - **Kawasaki Frontale** (Japan) 0–2 (South Korea) **Pohang Steelers**
    - Central Coast Mariners (Australia) 0–1 (China) Tianjin Teda
      - Final standings: Pohang 12 points, Kawasaki 10, Tianjin 8, Central Coast 2.
- (Poland) Polish Cup Final in Chorzów:
  - Ruch Chorzów 0–1 **Lech Poznań**
    - Poznań win the Cup for the fifth time, and qualify for Europa League.

==== Ice hockey ====
- Stanley Cup playoffs (seeding in parentheses; all times ET):
  - Western Conference Finals:
    - Game 2 in Detroit: (2) Detroit Red Wings 3, (4) Chicago Blackhawks 2 (OT). **Red Wings lead series 2–0**.

==== Shooting ====
- ISSF World Cup in Munich, Germany: (Qualification scores in parentheses)
  - Women's 50 metre rifle three positions: (gold) Yin Wen (China) 687.5 (590) (silver) Sonja Pfeilschifter (Germany) 685.7 (584) (bronze) Tejaswini Sawant (India) 685.0 (588)
  - Men's 10 metre air pistol: (gold) Jin Jong-oh (South Korea) 689.4 (586) (silver) Lee Dae-myung (South Korea) 686.7 (586) (bronze) Yury Dauhapolau (Belarus) 686.6 (584)
  - Women's skeet: (gold) Wei Ning (China) 98 (74 **EWR**) (silver) Svetlana Demina (Russia) 97 (73) (bronze) Kim Rhode (United States) 93 (73)
    - In the qualification round, Wei equalled the world record, hitting 74 of 75 targets.

=== May 18, 2009 (Monday) ===
==== Cricket ====
- West Indies in England:
  - 2nd Test in Chester-le-Street, day 5:
    - England 569/6d; West Indies 310 & 176 (f/o). **England win by an innings and 83 runs, and win 2-match series 2–0**.

==== Cycling ====
- UCI ProTour:
  - Volta a Catalunya:
    - Stage 1 (ITT): (1) Thor Hushovd (Norway) (Cervélo TestTeam) 4' 47" (2) Alejandro Valverde (Spain) (Caisse d'Epargne) + 1" (3) Greg Henderson (New Zealand) (Team Columbia–High Road) + 2"

==== Football (soccer) ====
- European Under-17 Championship in Germany:
  - Final in Magdeburg:
    - Netherlands 1–2 (ET) **Germany**
- European domestic (national) competitions: (listed by countries' alphabetic order; league standings prior to match in parentheses; teams that win titles in **bold**; teams that qualify to the Champions League in italics)
- (Czech Republic) Czech Gambrinus liga, matchday 28 of 30:
  - (16) Viktoria Žižkov 1–3 (1) **Slavia Prague**
    - Slavia secure the championship for the second straight year, with 8 points lead over Sparta Prague.
- (Israel) Israeli Premier League, matchday 31 of 33:
  - (1) Maccabi Haifa 1–0 (2) Hapoel Tel Aviv
    - Yaniv Katan's goal in the 61st minute gives Maccabi Haifa 5 points lead over Hapoel Tel Aviv, with 2 matches remaining. Haifa can secure the title with a win over Maccabi Netanya next weekend.

==== Ice hockey ====
- Stanley Cup playoffs (seeding in parentheses):
  - Eastern Conference Finals:
    - Game 1 in Pittsburgh: (4) Pittsburgh Penguins 3, (6) Carolina Hurricanes 2. **Penguins lead series 1–0**.

==== Shooting ====
- ISSF World Cup in Munich, Germany: (Qualification scores in parentheses)
  - Men's 50 metre rifle prone: (gold) Guy Starik (Israel) 703.3 (598) (silver) Matthew Emmons (United States) 702.0 (597) (bronze) Michael McPhail (United States) 701.0 (598)
  - Men's 25 metre rapid fire pistol: (gold) Christian Reitz (Germany) 785.3 (584) (silver) Martin Strnad (Czech Republic) 780.2 (586) (bronze) Keith Sanderson (United States) 780.0 (585)

=== May 17, 2009 (Sunday) ===
==== Auto racing ====
- World Touring Car Championship:
  - Pau Grand Prix in Pau, France
    - Race 1: (1) Robert Huff (United Kingdom) (Chevrolet Cruze) (2) Augusto Farfus (Brazil) (BMW 320si) (3) Jörg Müller (Germany) (BMW 320si)
    - Race 2: (1) Alain Menu (Switzerland) (Chevrolet Cruze) (2) Farfus (3) Huff
      - Standings (after 8 of 24 races): (1) Yvan Muller (France) (SEAT León 2.0 TDI) 45 points (2) Farfus 39 (3) Gabriele Tarquini (Italy) (SEAT León 2.0 TDI) 34
- FIA GT Championship:
  - Adria 2 Hours in Adria, Italy
    - (1) Michael Bartels (Germany) & Andrea Bertolini (Italy) (Maserati MC12 GT1) (2) Mike Hezemans (Netherlands) & Anthony Kumpen (Belgium) (Chevrolet Corvette C6.R) (3) Miguel Ramos (Portugal) & Alex Müller (Germany) (Maserati MC12 GT1)
      - Standings (after 2 of 8 races): (1) Bartels & Bertolini 18 points (2) Hezemans & Kumpen 13 (3) Guillaume Moreau (France) & Xavier Maassen (Netherlands) (Chevrolet Corvette C6.R) 11
- Deutsche Tourenwagen Masters:
  - Round 1 in Hockenheim, Germany
    - (1) Tom Kristensen (Denmark) (Audi A4) (2) Timo Scheider (Germany) (Audi A4) (3) Oliver Jarvis (Germany) (Audi A4)
      - Standings (after 1 of 10 races): (1) Kristensen 10 points (2) Scheider 8 (3) Jarvis 6

==== Badminton ====
- Sudirman Cup in Guangzhou, China:
  - Final: **China** 3–0 South Korea
    - China win the Cup for the third successive time and the seventh time in last 8 tournaments, without losing a match throughout the tournament.

==== Basketball ====
- NBA playoffs (seeding in parentheses):
  - Eastern Conference Semifinals:
    - Game 7 in Boston: (3) Orlando Magic 101, (2) Boston Celtics 82. **Magic win series 4–3.**
  - Western Conference Semifinals:
    - Game 7 in Los Angeles: (1) Los Angeles Lakers 89, (5) Houston Rockets 70. **Lakers win series 4–3.**
- Asia Champions Cup in Jakarta, Indonesia:
  - Quarterfinals:
    - Young Cagers (India) 73–97 (Iran) **Mahram**
    - Sangmu (South Korea) 70–89 (Jordan) **Zain**
    - **Al-Arabi** (Qatar) 76–71 (Philippines) Smart Gilas
    - **Al-Riyadi** (Lebanon) 86–69 (Indonesia) Satria Muda
- (France) French Cup Final:
  - **Le Mans** 79–65 Nancy

==== Cricket ====
- West Indies in England:
  - 2nd Test in Chester-le-Street, day 4:
    - England 569/6d; West Indies 310 (Ramnaresh Sarwan 100) & 115/3 (f/o). West Indies trail by 144 runs with 7 wickets remaining.

==== Cycling ====
- Giro d'Italia:
  - Stage 9: (1) Mark Cavendish (United Kingdom) (Team Columbia–High Road) 4h 16' 13" (2) Allan Davis (Australia) (Quick-Step) + 0" (3) Tyler Farrar (United States) (Garmin–Slipstream) + 0"
    - General classification: (1) Danilo Di Luca (Italy) (LPR Brakes–Farnese Vini) 37h 29' 48" (2) Thomas Lövkvist (Sweden) (Team Columbia–High Road) + 13" (3) Michael Rogers (Australia) (Team Columbia–High Road) + 44"

==== Football (soccer) ====
- European domestic (national) competitions: (listed by countries' alphabetic order; league standings prior to match in parentheses; teams that win titles in **bold**; teams that qualify to the Champions League in italics)
  - (Austria) Austrian Bundesliga, matchday 34 of 36:
    - **Red Bull Salzburg** clinch the championship and qualify for the Champions League, as a result of 2nd place Rapid Vienna's 3–0 loss to Ried.
  - (Croatia) Croatian Prva HNL, matchday 31 of 33:
    - **Dinamo Zagreb** clinch the championship and qualify for the Champions League, with 2–0 win over Slaven Belupo.
  - (France) French Ligue 1, matchday 36 of 38:
    - (2) Marseille 1–3 (3) Lyon
      - Standings: Bordeaux 74 points, Marseille 71, Lyon 67.
  - (Italy) Italian Serie A, matchday 32 of 34:
    - (1) **Inter** 3–0 (14) Siena
    - (3) Juventus 2–2 (11) Atalanta
    - (4) Fiorentina 1–0 (12) Sampdoria
    - (5) Genoa 2–2 (16) Chievo
      - Standings: **Inter** 81 points, Milan 71, Juventus 68, Fiorentina 67, Genoa 62. Juventus clinch a berth in the Champions League.
  - (Netherlands) Dutch Cup Final in Rotterdam:
    - **Heerenveen** 2–2 (ET) Twente. Heerenveen win 5–4 in penalty shootout.
      - Heerenveen win the first ever trophy in their history, and qualify for Europa League.
  - (Romania) Romanian Liga I, matchday 31 of 34:
    - (1) Dinamu București 3–1 (3) Timişoara
    - (12) Oţelul Galaţi 0–2 (2) Unirea Urziceni
      - Standings: Dinamo 65 points, Urziceni 63, Timişoara 58.
  - (Scotland) Scottish Premier League, matchday 37 of 38:
    - (6) Hibernian 0–0 (2) Celtic
      - Standings: Rangers 83 points, Celtic 81. Celtic must beat Hearts and hope Rangers don't beat Dundee United to win the title.
  - (Spain) Spanish La Liga, matchday 36 of 38:
    - (10) Mallorca 2–1 (1) **Barcelona**
      - Samuel Eto'o scores his 29th goal of the season for Barcelona, but misses a penalty in injury time that could level the score.
    - (6) Atlético Madrid 1–0 (4) Valencia
      - Standings: **Barcelona** 86 points, Real Madrid 78, Sevilla 64, Atlético Madrid 61, Valencia & Villarreal 59.
  - (Turkey) Turkish Süper Lig, matchday 32 of 34:
    - (13) Ankaragücü 1–3 (2) Beşiktaş
    - (3) Trabzonspor 1–0 (6) Bursaspor
      - Standings: Beşiktaş 65 points, Sivasspor 63, Trabzonspor 62.

==== Golf ====
- PGA Tour:
  - Valero Texas Open in San Antonio, Texas:
    - Winner: Zach Johnson (United States) 265 (−15) PO
      - Johnson defeats James Driscoll (United States) , who erased Johnson's 8-shot lead entering the final day with a 62, on the first playoff hole.
- European Tour:
  - Irish Open in Baltray, Ireland:
    - Winner: Shane Lowry (A) (Republic of Ireland) 271 (−17) PO
      - Lowry beat Robert Rock on the 3rd playoff hole to become the third amateur winner in the European Tour history.
- LPGA Tour:
  - Sybase Classic in Clifton, New Jersey:
    - Winner: Ji Young Oh (South Korea) 264 (−14)

==== Ice hockey ====
- Stanley Cup playoffs (seeding in parentheses):
  - Western Conference Finals:
    - Game 1 in Detroit: (2) Detroit Red Wings 5, (4) Chicago Blackhawks 2. **Red Wings lead series 1–0**.

==== Lacrosse ====
- NCAA Division I Men's Championship (seeding in parentheses; all times ET):
  - Quarterfinals in Annapolis, Maryland:
    - (1) Virginia 19, (8) Johns Hopkins 8
    - (3) Duke 12, (4) North Carolina 11

==== Motorcycle racing ====
- Moto GP:
  - French motorcycle Grand Prix in Le Mans, France
    - (1) Jorge Lorenzo (Spain) (Yamaha YZR-M1) (2) Marco Melandri (Italy) (Kawasaki ZX-RR) (3) Dani Pedrosa (Spain) (Honda RC212V)
      - Riders' standings after 4 of 17 races: (1) Lorenzo 66 points (2) Valentino Rossi (Italy) (Yamaha YZR-M1) & Casey Stoner (Ducati Desmosedici) 65
- Superbike World Championship:
  - Kyalami Superbike World Championship round in Midrand, South Africa
    - Race 1: (1) Noriyuki Haga (Japan) (Ducati 1098R) (2) Michel Fabrizio (Italy) (Ducati 1098R) (3) Ben Spies (United States) (Yamaha YZF-R1)
    - Race 2: (1) Haga (2) Fabrizio (3) Jonathan Rea (United Kingdom) (Honda CBR1000RR)
      - Riders' standings after 6 of 14 rounds: (1) Haga 250 points (2) Fabrizio 165 (3) Spies 162

==== Shooting ====
- ISSF World Cup in Munich, Germany: (Qualification scores in parentheses)
  - Men's 50 metre pistol: (gold) Vladimir Gontcharov (Russia) 666.5 (567) (silver) Damir Mikec (Serbia) 666.1 (574) (bronze) Rashid Yunusmetov (Kazakhstan) 664.9 (568)
  - Women's 25 metre pistol: (gold) Yuan Jing (China) 793.0 (588) (silver) Zhao Xu (China) 789.0 (582) (bronze) Munkhbayar Dorjsuren (Germany) 788.4 (589)
  - Men's double trap: (gold) Joshua Richmond (United States) 188 (145) (silver) Richard Faulds (United Kingdom) 187+2 (143) (bronze) Rashid al-Athba (Qatar) 187+0 (144)

==== Snooker ====
- World Series of Snooker in Killarney, Ireland
  - Final: **Shaun Murphy** (England) 5–1 (England) Jimmy White

==== Tennis ====
- ATP Tour and WTA Tour:
  - Madrid Masters in Madrid, Spain: (seeding in parentheses)
    - Men's final: **Roger Federer** (Switzerland) (2) def. Rafael Nadal (Spain) (1) 6–4, 6–4
      - Federer wins his first ATP title of the year and stops Nadal's winning streak on clay at 33 matches.
    - Women's final: **Dinara Safina** (Russia) (1) def. Caroline Wozniacki (Denmark) (9) 6–2, 6–4
      - Safina wins second tournament in successive weeks after her victory in Rome last week. Wozniacki reach her first career tier I final.

=== May 16, 2009 (Saturday) ===
==== Auto racing ====
- Sprint Cup Series:
  - NASCAR Sprint All-Star Race XXV in Concord, North Carolina
    - (1) Tony Stewart (Indiana) (Stewart Haas Racing) (2) Matt Kenseth (Wisconsin) (Roush Fenway Racing) (3) Kurt Busch (Nevada) (Penske Championship Racing)

==== Badminton ====
- Sudirman Cup in Guangzhou, China:
  - Semifinals:
    - **South Korea** 3–1 Indonesia
    - **China** 3–0 Malaysia
      - China advance to the final for the seventh consecutive time, and will meet Korea who is the last team that beat them in 2007 Final.

==== Basketball ====
- Asia Champions Cup in Jakarta, Indonesia: (teams in **bold** clinch quarterfinal berths, teams in ~~strike~~ are eliminated)
  - Group A:
    - ~~Al-Qadsia~~ (Kuwait) 93–98 (Philippines) **Smart Gilas**
      - Gilas clinch the group's second best record and the best preliminary round finish by a Filipino team since 1996. They'll face Al-Arabi in the quarterfinals.
    - **Sangmu** (South Korea) 56–90 (Iran) **Mahram**
      - Mahram clinch the top spot in the group to face idle Young Cagers of India.
  - Group B:
    - **Satria Muda** (Indonesia) 79–59 (India) **Young Cagers**
      - Satria Muda book the first Indonesian quarterfinal berth since the tournament expanded into three knockout rounds in 2004 to meet Lebanese club Al-Riyadi in the quarterfinals.
    - **Zain** (Jordan) 94–62 (Qatar) **Al-Arabi**
      - Zain clinch the top spot in the group to face Sangmu in the final eight.

==== Cricket ====
- West Indies in England:
  - 2nd Test in Chester-le-Street, day 3:
    - England 569/6d (Alastair Cook 160); West Indies 94/3. West Indies trail by 475 runs with 7 wickets remaining in the 1st innings.

==== Cycling ====
- Giro d'Italia:
  - Stage 8: (1) Kanstantin Sioutsou (Belarus) (Team Columbia–High Road) 5h 04' 34" (2) Edvald Boasson Hagen (Norway) (Team Columbia–High Road) + 21" (3) Danilo Di Luca (Italy) (LPR Brakes–Farnese Vini) + 21"
    - General classification: (1) Di Luca 33h 13' 35" (2) Thomas Lövkvist (Sweden) (Team Columbia–High Road) + 13" (3) Michael Rogers (Australia) (Team Columbia–High Road) + 44"

==== Field hockey ====
- Men's Asia Cup in Kuantan, Malaysia:
  - Final:
    - (gold) South Korea 1–0 (silver) Pakistan
      - Korea win the title for the third time and qualify to 2010 World Cup.
  - Bronze medal match:
    - (bronze) China 3–3 Malaysia. China win 7–6 in penalty shootout.

==== Football (soccer) ====
- UEFA Women's Cup Finals, first leg:
  - Zvezda Perm (Russia) 0–6 (Germany) Duisburg
- European domestic (national) competitions: (listed by countries alphabetic order; league standings prior to match in parentheses; teams that win titles in **bold**)
  - (Belgium) Belgian First Division, final matchday:
    - (8) Genk 0–2 (2) Anderlecht, in progress
    - (3) Gent 0–1 (1) Standard Liège, in progress
      - Anderlecht and Standard finish the season levelled at the top on 77 points. According to the league rules, they will meet in 2 legs playoff series to decide the title. The matches will be played on May 21 and 24. Both teams qualify to the Champions League, but only the champion will go directly to the group stage. Club Brugge and Gent finish 3rd and 4th respectively and qualify for Europa League.
  - (Cyprus) Cypriot Cup Final in Nicosia:
    - **APOP Kinyras Peyias** 2–0 AEL Limassol
      - APOP Kinyras Peyias win the first ever trophy in their history, and qualify for Europa League.
  - (England) English Premier League, matchday 37 of 38:
    - (1) **Manchester United** 0–0 (4) Arsenal
      - United secure the championship for the third straight year, and equal Liverpool's record of 18 championship titles. It's United's third title of the season, following FIFA Club World Cup and League Cup, and with Champions League Final still to come.
  - (France) French Ligue 1, matchday 36 of 38:
    - (2) Bordeaux 3–2 (15) Le Mans
      - Bordeaux take 3 points lead over Marseille, who would regain the lead on goals difference with a win against 3rd place Lyon on Sunday. Bordeaux's win also secures them a berth in the Champions League group stage, and ensures that Lyon's record run of consecutive French league titles end at seven.
  - (Germany) German Bundesliga, matchday 33 of 34:
    - (11) Hanover 0–5 (1) Wolfsburg
    - (7) Hoffenheim 2–2 (2) Bayern Munich
    - (3) Hertha Berlin 0–0 (8) Schalke 04
    - (4) Stuttgart 2–0 (17) Energie Cottbus
      - Standings with one match remaining: Wolfsburg 66 points (goals difference +35), Bayern 64 (+28), Stuttgart 64 (+21), Hertha 63 (+11). Wolfsburg can secure the championship with a draw at home against Werder Bremen, unless Bayern beat Stuttgart by at least 7 goals margin. Hertha is out of the title race, but a win in Karlsruhe will give them a berth in the Champions League at the expense of either Bayern or Stuttgart.
  - (Italy) Italian Serie A, matchday 32 of 34:
    - (8) Udinese 2–1 (2) Milan
      - Milan's loss means their crosstown rival **Inter** clinch the championship for the fourth straight year, and put the Nerazzurri levelled with the Rossoneri on 17 titles.
  - (Lithuania) Lithuanian Cup Final in Kaunas:
    - Tauras Tauragė 0–1 **Sūduva**
      - Sūduva win the first ever trophy in their history, and qualify for Europa League.
  - (Scotland) Scottish Premier League, matchday 37 of 38:
    - (2) Rangers 2–1 (5) Aberdeen
    - (3) Hearts 3–0 (4) Dundee United
      - Rangers take 3 points lead at the top over Celtic, that could regain the lead on goals difference if they beat Hibernian on Sunday. Hearts secure 3rd place and qualify for Europa League. Dundee United will also qualify unless they lose to Rangers on May 24 and Aberdeen beat Hibernian.
  - (Spain) Spanish La Liga, matchday 36 of 38:
    - (7) Villarreal 3–2 (2) Real Madrid
    - (17) Osasuna 0–0 (3) Sevilla
      - Real Madrid's loss means **Barcelona** clinch the championship, and capture the league and cup double, with the Champions League Final still to come on May 27. Sevilla go 5 points ahead of Valencia and Villarreal.
  - (Turkey) Turkish Süper Lig, matchday 32 of 34:
    - (18) Hacettepe 1–2 (2) Sivasspor
      - Sivasspor go to the top, one point ahead of Beşiktaş, who play against Ankaragücü on Sunday.
  - (Ukraine) Ukrainian League, matchday 28 of 30:
    - UEFA Cup Finalist Shakhtar Donetsk secure 2nd place and qualify for the Champions League.

==== Horse racing ====
- U.S. Triple Crown:
  - Preakness Stakes in Baltimore:
    - (1) Rachel Alexandra (2) Mine That Bird (3) Musket Man
      - The favored Rachel Alexandra is the first filly to win the Preakness since 1924. Calvin Borel, who rode Mine That Bird to victory in the Kentucky Derby, becomes the first jockey ever to win the first two legs of the same year's Triple Crown on two different horses. With this race, Affirmed will remain the last Triple Crown winner for at least another year.

==== Lacrosse ====
- NCAA Division I Men's Championship (seeding in parentheses):
  - Quarterfinals in Hempstead, New York:
    - (2) Syracuse 11, Maryland 6
    - (5) Cornell 6, (4) Princeton 4

==== Rugby union ====
- Guinness Premiership Final in London:
  - **Leicester Tigers** 10–9 London Irish

==== Shooting ====
- ISSF World Cup in Munich, Germany: (Qualification scores in parentheses)
  - Men's 10 metre air rifle: (gold) Sergy Rikhter (Israel) 701.7 (599) (silver) Péter Sidi (Hungary) 701.5 (597) (bronze) Zhu Qinan (China) 700.6 (597)
  - Women's 10 metre air rifle: (gold) Darya Shytko (Ukraine) 502.7 (399) (silver) Sonja Pfeilschifter (Germany) 502.3 (399) (bronze) Beate Gauss (Germany) 502.0 (399)

=== May 15, 2009 (Friday) ===
==== Badminton ====
- Sudirman Cup in Guangzhou, China:
  - 5th place playoff:
    - **Denmark** 3–2 England
  - 7th place playoff:
    - Hong Kong 1–3 **Japan**
      - Hong Kong is relegated to Group 2 in 2011 Sudirman Cup.
  - 9th place playoff:
    - **Thailand** 3–0 Russia
      - Thailand is promoted to Group 1 in 2011.

==== Basketball ====
- Asia Champions Cup in Jakarta, Indonesia: (teams in **bold** clinch quarterfinal berths, teams in ~~strike~~ are eliminated)
  - Group A:
    - **Smart Gilas** (Philippines) 91–86 (Lebanon) **Al-Riyadi**
    - **Mahram** (Iran) 120–80 (Kuwait) ~~Al-Qadsia~~
  - Group B:
    - **Al-Arabi** (Qatar) 77–84 (Indonesia) Satria Muda
    - **Young Cagers** (India) 82–76 (United Arab Emirates) Al-Wasl

==== Cricket ====
- West Indies in England:
  - 2nd Test in Chester-le-Street, day 2:
    - No play due to rain. Score remains England 302/2.

==== Cycling ====
- Giro d'Italia:
  - Stage 7: (1) Edvald Boasson Hagen (Norway) (Team Columbia–High Road) 5h 56' 53" (2) Robert Hunter (South Africa) (Barloworld) + 0" (3) Pavel Brutt (Russia) (Team Katusha) + 0"
    - General classification: (1) Danilo Di Luca (Italy) (LPR Brakes–Farnese Vini) 28h 08' 48" (2) Thomas Lövkvist (Sweden) (Team Columbia–High Road) + 5" (3) Michael Rogers (Australia) (Team Columbia–High Road) + 36"

==== Field hockey ====
- Men's Asia Cup in Kuantan, Malaysia:
  - 5th place playoff:
    - India 5–1 Japan

==== Football (soccer) ====
- European Under-17 Championship in Germany:
  - Semi-finals:
    - Switzerland 1–2 **Netherlands** in Grimma
    - **Germany** 2–0 Italy in Dessau-Rosslau

==== Lacrosse ====
- Champion's Cup Final in Calgary, Alberta
  - Calgary Roughnecks 12, New York Titans 10

==== Shooting ====
- ISSF World Cup in Munich, Germany: (Qualification scores in parentheses)
  - Men's trap: (gold) Massimo Fabbrizi (Italy) 148 (125 **EWR**) (silver) Gao Bo (China) 145+6 (123) (bronze) Anton Glasnović (Croatia) 145+5 (123)
    - In the qualification round, Fabbrizi equalled the world record with a perfect 125.

=== May 14, 2009 (Thursday) ===
==== Badminton ====
- Sudirman Cup in Guangzhou, China: (teams in **bold** advance to the semifinals)
  - Group 1A:
    - Denmark 2–3 **Malaysia**
  - Group 1B:
    - **Indonesia** 0–5 **China**
      - China win the group without dropping a match.

==== Basketball ====
- NBA playoffs (seeding in parentheses):
  - Eastern Conference Semifinals:
    - Game 6 in Orlando: (3) Orlando Magic 83, (2) Boston Celtics 75. **Series tied 3–3.**
  - Western Conference Semifinals:
    - Game 6 in Houston: (5) Houston Rockets 95, (1) Los Angeles Lakers 80. **Series tied 3–3.**
- Asia Champions Cup in Jakarta, Indonesia: (teams in **bold** clinch quarterfinal berths)
  - Group A:
    - Al-Qadsia (Kuwait) 66–69 (South Korea) Sangmu
    - Al-Riyadi (Lebanon) 61–87 (Iran) Mahram
  - Group B:
    - Satria Muda (Indonesia) 71–84 (Jordan) **Zain**
    - Al-Wasl (United Arab Emirates) 79–97 (Qatar) **Al-Arabi**
- (Israel) Israeli Super League Playoff:
  - Quarterfinals, game 5:
    - Hapoel Holon 80–87(OT) Hapoel Gilboa/Galil. **Gilboa/Galil win best-of-5 series 3–2.**
      - Gilboa/Galil becomes the first ever team in Israeli playoff history to win game 5 on the road, and will play against Maccabi Tel Aviv in the Final Four semifinal, while Hapoel Jerusalem and Maccabi Haifa meet in the other semifinal.

==== Cricket ====
- West Indies in England:
  - 2nd Test in Chester-le-Street, day 1:
    - England 302/2 (Alastair Cook 126*, Ravi Bopara 108)

==== Cycling ====
- Giro d'Italia:
  - Stage 6: (1) Michele Scarponi (Italy) (Diquigiovanni–Androni) 5h 49' 55" (2) Edvald Boasson Hagen (Norway) (Team Columbia–High Road) + 32" (3) Allan Davis (Australia) (Quick-Step) + 32"
    - General classification: (1) Danilo Di Luca (Italy) (LPR Brakes–Farnese Vini) 22h 11' 15" (2) Thomas Lövkvist (Sweden) (Team Columbia–High Road) + 5" (3) Michael Rogers (Australia) (Team Columbia–High Road) + 36"

==== Field hockey ====
- Men's Asia Cup in Kuantan, Malaysia:
  - Semifinals:
    - South Korea 5–1 China
    - Pakistan 4–2 Malaysia
  - 5th–7th classification:
    - India 11–1 Bangladesh

==== Football (soccer) ====
- Copa Libertadores Round of 16, first leg:
  - Defensor Sporting (Uruguay) 2–2 (Argentina) Boca Juniors
- Copa Libertadores Round of 16, second leg: (first leg score in parentheses)
  - Cruzeiro (Brazil) 1–0 (2–1) Universidad de Chile. **Cruzeiro win 3–1 on aggregate.**
  - Libertad (Paraguay) 0–0 (0–3) (Argentina) Estudiantes. **Estudiantes win 3–0 on aggregate.**

==== Ice hockey ====
- Stanley Cup playoffs: (seeding in parentheses)
  - Eastern Conference Semifinals:
    - Game 7 in Boston: (6) Carolina Hurricanes 3, (1) Boston Bruins 2 (OT). **Hurricanes win series 4–3.**
  - Western Conference Semifinals:
    - Game 7 in Detroit: (2) Detroit Red Wings 4, (8) Anaheim Ducks 3. **Red Wings win series 4–3.**

==== Shooting ====
- ISSF World Cup in Munich, Germany: (Qualification scores in parentheses)
  - Women's trap: (gold) Irina Laricheva (Russia) 92 (72) (silver) Lu Xingyu (China) 91 (72) (bronze) Susanne Kiermayer (Germany) 90 (72)

=== May 13, 2009 (Wednesday) ===
==== Badminton ====
- Sudirman Cup in Guangzhou, China: (teams in **bold** advance to the semifinals; teams in ~~strike~~ will play in relegation playoff)
  - Group 1A:
    - **South Korea** 3–2 ~~Hong Kong~~
      - Korea will play against the loser of China vs. Indonesia match in the semifinals on May 16.
  - Group 1B:
    - England 4–1 ~~Japan~~
      - Japan and Hong Kong will meet on May 15, with the losing team relegating to group 2 in 2011 Sudirman Cup.

==== Basketball ====
- NBA playoffs (seeding in parentheses):
  - Western Conference Semifinals:
    - Game 5 in Denver: (2) Denver Nuggets 124, (6) Dallas Mavericks 110. **Nuggets win series 4–1.**
- Asia Champions Cup in Jakarta, Indonesia:
  - Group A:
    - Mahram (Iran) 98–87 (Philippines) Smart Gilas
    - Sangmu (South Korea) 86–97 (Lebanon) Al-Riyadi
  - Group B:
    - Al-Arabi (Qatar) 88–63 (India) Young Cagers
    - Zain (Jordan) 84–65 (United Arab Emirates) Al-Wasl

==== Cycling ====
- Giro d'Italia:
  - Stage 5: (1) Denis Menchov (Russia) (Rabobank) 3h 15' 24" (2) Danilo Di Luca (Italy) (LPR Brakes–Farnese Vini) + 2" (3) Thomas Lövkvist (Sweden) (Team Columbia–High Road) + 5"
    - General classification: (1) Di Luca 16h 20' 44" (2) Lövkvist + 5" (3) Michael Rogers (Australia) (Team Columbia–High Road) + 36"

==== Football (soccer) ====
- Copa Libertadores Round of 16, second leg: (first leg score in parentheses)
  - **Grêmio** (Brazil) 2–0 (3–1) (Peru) Universidad San Martín. Grêmio win 5–1 on aggregate.
- European domestic (national) competitions: (listed in countries alphabetic order)
  - (Croatia) Croatian Cup Final, first leg:
    - Dinamo Zagreb 3–0 Hajduk Split
  - (England) English Premier League:
    - Wigan Athletic 1–2 Manchester United
      - United's win, thanks to Michael Carrick's goal in the 86th minute, put them on the brink of the championship, with 86 points, 6 ahead of Liverpool. Only 2 losses for United and 2 wins for Liverpool will deny them the title.
  - (France) French Ligue 1, matchday 35 of 38:
    - Nice 0–2 Marseille
    - Valenciennes 1–2 Bordeaux
      - Marseille and Bordeaux are levelled at the top on 71 points, with 3 matches remaining.
  - (Germany) German Bundesliga, matchday 32 of 34:
    - Schalke 04 1–2 Stuttgart
      - Stuttgart is 2 points from the top in 4th place.
  - (Italy) Italian Cup Final in Rome:
    - **Lazio** 1–1 (ET) Sampdoria. Lazio win 6–5 in penalty shootout.
      - Lazio win the Cup for the fifth time.
  - (Scotland) Scottish Premier League, matchday 36 of 38:
    - Hibernian 1–1 Rangers
      - Rangers and Celtic are levelled on 80 points at the top.
  - (Spain) Spanish Cup Final in Valencia:
    - Athletic Bilbao 1–4 **Barcelona**
      - Barça win the Cup for a record 25th time, after a break of 11 years, and captures the first leg of a potential treble.
  - (Turkey) Turkish Cup Final in İzmir:
    - Fenerbahçe 2–4 **Beşiktaş**
      - Beşiktaş win the Cup for the 8th time in history, and the 3rd time in 4 years.

==== Ice hockey ====
- Stanley Cup playoffs: (Seeding in parentheses)
  - Eastern Conference Semifinals:
    - Game 7 in Washington: (4) Pittsburgh Penguins 6, (2) Washington Capitals 2. **Penguins win series 4–3.**

=== May 12, 2009 (Tuesday) ===
==== Badminton ====
- Sudirman Cup in Guangzhou, China: (teams in **bold** advance to the semifinals)
  - Group 1A:
    - Denmark 1–4 **South Korea**
      - Denmark and Malaysia will battle for another semifinal berth.
  - Group 1B:
    - **China** 5–0 Japan
      - **Indonesia** also advance to the semifinals.

==== Basketball ====
- NBA playoffs (seeding in parentheses):
  - Eastern Conference Semifinals:
    - Game 5 in Boston: (2) Boston Celtics 92, (3) Orlando Magic 88. **Celtics lead series 3–2.**
  - Western Conference Semifinals:
    - Game 5 in Los Angeles: (1) Los Angeles Lakers 118, (5) Houston Rockets 78. **Lakers lead series 3–2.**
- Asia Champions Cup in Jakarta, Indonesia:
  - Group A:
    - Al-Riyadi (Lebanon) 87–78 (Kuwait) Al-Qadsia
    - Smart Gilas (Philippines) 90–76 (South Korea) Sangmu
  - Group B:
    - Al-Wasl (United Arab Emirates) 83–78 (Indonesia) Satria Muda
    - Young Cagers (India) 59–90 (Jordan) Zain

==== Cycling ====
- Giro d'Italia:
  - Stage 4: (1) Danilo Di Luca (Italy) (LPR Brakes–Farnese Vini) 4h 15' 04" (2) Stefano Garzelli (Italy) (Acqua & Sapone–Caffè Mokambo) + 0" (3) Franco Pellizotti (Italy) (Liquigas) + 0"
    - General Classification: (1) Thomas Lövkvist (Sweden) (Team Columbia–High Road) 13h 05' 28" (2) Di Luca + 2" (3) Michael Rogers (Australia) (Team Columbia–High Road) + 6"

==== Field hockey ====
- Men's Asia Cup in Kuantan, Malaysia: (teams in **bold** advance to the semifinals)
  - Pool A:
    - **South Korea** 9–0 Bangladesh
    - **Malaysia** 4–1 Japan
  - Pool B:
    - **China** 2–2 India
    - **Pakistan** also advance.

==== Football (soccer) ====
- CONCACAF Champions League Final, second leg: (first leg score in parentheses)
  - **Atlante** (Mexico) 0–0 (2–0) (Mexico) Cruz Azul. Atlante win 2–0 on aggregate.
- Copa Libertadores Round of 16, second leg: (first leg score in parentheses)
  - Sport Recife (Brazil) 1–0 (0–1) (Brazil) **Palmeiras**. 1–1 on aggregate, Palmeiras win 3–1 in penalty shootout.
  - **Caracas** (Venezuela) 4–0 (1–2) (Ecuador) Deportivo Cuenca. Caracas win 5–2 on aggregate.
- European domestic (national) competitions: (listed in countries alphabetic order)
  - (Estonia) Estonian Cup Final in Tallinn:
    - **Flora Tallinn** 0–0 (ET) Nomme Kalju. Flora win 4–3 in penalty shootout.
      - Flora win the Cup for the second successive year and fourth time in history.
  - (Germany) German Bundesliga, matchday 32 of 34:
    - Wolfsburg 3–0 Dortmund
    - Bayern München 3–0 Leverkusen
    - Köln 1–2 Hertha Berlin
      - With 2 matches remaining, Wolfsburg and Bayern are levelled at the top on 63 points, one ahead of Hertha.
  - (Scotland) Scottish Premier League, matchday 36 of 38:
    - Celtic 2–1 Dundee United
      - Celtic goes to the top with 80 points, one ahead of Rangers, who play against Hibernian on Wednesday.

==== Ice hockey ====
- Stanley Cup playoffs (seeding in parentheses):
  - Eastern Conference Semifinals:
    - Game 6 in Raleigh: (1) Boston Bruins 4, (6) Carolina Hurricanes 2. **Series tied 3–3.**
  - Western Conference Semifinals:
    - Game 6 in Anaheim: (8) Anaheim Ducks 2, (2) Detroit Red Wings 1. **Series tied 3–3.**

=== May 11, 2009 (Monday) ===
==== Badminton ====
- Sudirman Cup in Guangzhou, China:
  - Group 1A:
    - Malaysia 4–1 Hong Kong
  - Group 1B:
    - Indonesia 4–1 England

==== Basketball ====
- NBA playoffs (seeding in parentheses)
  - Eastern Conference Semifinals:
    - Game 4 in Atlanta: (1) Cleveland Cavaliers 84, (4) Atlanta Hawks 74. **Cavaliers win series 4–0.**
      - The Cavs advance to the conference final with their 8th consecutive win by double-digit margins, and become the second team in NBA history to sweep the first two series since the first round was expanded to best-of-7 games.
  - Western Conference Semifinals:
    - Game 4 in Dallas: (6) Dallas Mavericks 119, (2) Denver Nuggets 117. **Nuggets lead series 3–1.**
      - The Mavericks stay alive in the series thanks to 44 points from Dirk Nowitzki, including 19 in the fourth quarter. Carmelo Anthony scores playoff career-high 41 points for the Nuggets.

==== Cycling ====
- Giro d'Italia:
  - Stage 3: (1) Alessandro Petacchi (Italy) (LPR Brakes–Farnese Vini) 4h 45' 27" (2) Tyler Farrar (United States) (Garmin–Slipstream) + 0" (3) Francesco Gavazzi (Italy) (Lampre–NGC) + 0"
    - General classification: (1) Petacchi 8h 50' 06" (2) Farrar + 8" (3) Michael Rogers (Australia) (Team Columbia–High Road) + 18"

==== Field hockey ====
- Men's Asia Cup in Kuantan, Malaysia:
  - Pool A:
    - Japan 2–3 South Korea
    - Bangladesh 1–7 Malaysia

==== Football (soccer) ====
- Israel women's cup final:
  - Maccabi Holon 4–2 (AET) ASA Tel Aviv
    - Sivan Fahima scores a hat-trick and leads Holon to its seventh consecutive title, after ASA levelled the score in the 11th minute of injury time to send the match to extra time.

==== Ice hockey ====
- Stanley Cup playoffs (seeding in parentheses)
  - Eastern Conference Semifinals:
    - Game 6 in Pittsburgh: (2) Washington Capitals 5, (4) Pittsburgh Penguins 4 (OT). **Series tied 3–3.**
  - Western Conference Semifinals:
    - Game 6 in Chicago: (4) Chicago Blackhawks 7, (3) Vancouver Canucks 5. **Blackhawks win series 4–2.**

=== May 10, 2009 (Sunday) ===
==== Auto racing ====
- Formula One:
  - Spanish Grand Prix in Barcelona, Spain
    - (1) Jenson Button (United Kingdom) (Brawn–Mercedes) (2) Rubens Barrichello (Brazil) (Brawn-Mercedes) (3) Mark Webber (Australia) (Red Bull–Renault)
      - Drivers standings (after 5 of 17 races): (1) Button 41 points (2) Barrichello 27 (3) Sebastian Vettel (Germany) (Red Bull-Renault) 23

==== Badminton ====
- Sudirman Cup in Guangzhou, China:
  - Group 1A:
    - Malaysia 2–3 South Korea
    - Denmark 3–2 Hong Kong
  - Group 1B:
    - Indonesia 4–1 Japan
    - China 5–0 England

==== Basketball ====
- NBA playoffs: (Seeding in parentheses)
  - Eastern Conference Semifinals:
    - Game 4 in Orlando: (2) Boston Celtics 95, (3) Orlando Magic 94. **Series tied 2–2.**
      - Glen Davis converts an open jump shot at the buzzer to tie the series at 2 games apiece.
  - Western Conference Semifinals:
    - Game 4 in Houston: (5) Houston Rockets 99, (1) Los Angeles Lakers 87. **Series tied 2–2.**

==== Cycling ====
- Giro d'Italia
  - Stage 2: (1) Alessandro Petacchi (Italy) (LPR Brakes–Farnese Vini) 3h 43' 07" (2) Mark Cavendish (United Kingdom) (Team Columbia–High Road) + 0" (3) Ben Swift (United Kingdom) (Team Katusha) + 0"
    - General Classification: (1) Cavendish 4h 04' 43" (2) Mark Renshaw (Australia) (Team Columbia–High Road) + 14" (3) Michael Rogers (Australia) (Team Columbia–High Road) + 14"

==== Field hockey ====
- Men's Asia Cup in Kuantan, Malaysia: (team in **bold** advances to the semifinals)
  - Pool B:
    - India 2–3 **Pakistan**

==== Football (soccer) ====
- European domestic (national) competitions: (listed in countries alphabetic order; teams that win titles in **bold**)
  - (England) English Premier League, matchday 36 of 38:
    - Manchester United 2–0 Manchester City
      - United, with 3 matches remaining, lead by 3 points over Liverpool who have 2 matches left.
    - Arsenal 1–4 Chelsea
      - 3rd place Chelsea secure a berth in the Champions League group stage.
  - (Italy) Italian Serie A, matchday 35 of 38:
    - Chievo 2–2 Inter
    - Milan 1–1 Juventus
      - Inter lead by 7 points over Milan with 3 matches remaining.
  - (Netherlands) Dutch Eredivisie, final standings after 34 rounds: (1) **AZ Alkmaar** 80 points (qualify for Champions League group stage) (2) FC Twente 69 (qualify for Champions League 3rd qualifying round) (3) AFC Ajax 68 (qualify for Europa League) 4. PSV Eindhoven 65 (Europa League) 5. SC Heerenveen 60 (Europa League)
  - (Portugal) Primeira Liga, matchday 28 of 30:
    - **Porto** 1–0 Nacional
      - Porto secure the title for the fourth successive year and qualify for the Champions League group stage. Runner up Sporting qualify for the Champions League 3rd qualifying round.
  - (Spain) Spanish La Liga, matchday 35 of 38:
    - Barcelona 3–3 Villarreal
      - A goal by Joseba Llorente Etxarri in the 2nd minute of injury time spoils Barcelona's championship party. Barça lead by 8 points with 3 matches remaining, and need one more point to secure the title.
  - (Ukraine) Ukrainian Premier League, matchday 27 of 30:
    - **Dynamo Kyiv** secure the title with 3 matches remaining and qualify for the Champions League group stage.

==== Golf ====
- PGA Tour:
  - The Players Championship in Ponte Vedra Beach, Florida:
    - Winner: Henrik Stenson (Sweden) 276 (−12)
      - Stenson wins his second PGA Tour title and 13th professional tournament.
- European Tour:
  - Italian Open in Turin, Italy:
    - Winner: Daniel Vancsik (Argentina) 267 (−17)
      - Vanczik wins his second European Tour title and 9th professional tournament.
- LPGA Tour:
  - Michelob ULTRA Open at Kingsmill in Williamsburg, Virginia:
    - Winner: Cristie Kerr (United States) 268 (−16)
      - Kerr wins the tournament for the second time and her 12th LPGA Tour title.

==== Ice hockey ====
- Stanley Cup playoffs: (Seeding in parentheses)
  - Eastern Conference Semifinals:
    - Game 5 in Boston: (1) Boston Bruins 4, (6) Carolina Hurricanes 0. **Hurricanes lead series 3–2.**
  - Western Conference Semifinals:
    - Game 5 in Detroit: (2) Detroit Red Wings 4, (8) Anaheim Ducks 1. **Red Wings lead series 3–2.**
- World Championship in Berne, Switzerland:
  - Final:
    - (gold) Russia 2–1 (silver) Canada
  - Bronze medal game:
    - (bronze) Sweden 4–2 United States

==== Motorcycle racing ====
- Superbike World Championship:
  - Monza Superbike World Championship round in Monza, Italy
    - Race 1: (1) Michel Fabrizio (Italy) (Ducati 1098R) (2) Noriyuki Haga (Japan) (Ducati 1098R) (3) Ryuichi Kiyonari (Japan) (Honda CBR1000RR)
    - Race 2: (1) Ben Spies (United States) (Yamaha YZF-R1) (2) Fabrizio (3) Kiyonari
      - Riders' standings after 5 of 14 rounds: (1) Haga 200 points (2) Spies 146 (3) Fabrizio 125

==== Snooker ====
- World Series of Snooker Grand Final in Portimão, Portugal:
  - Final (best of 11 frames): John Higgins (Scotland) 2–6 (England) **Shaun Murphy**

==== Tennis ====
- ATP Tour:
  - Estoril Open in Estoril, Portugal:
    - Final: (Spain) **Albert Montañés** def. (United States) James Blake, 5–7, 7–6(6), 6–0
      - Montañés wins his second career title.
  - BMW Open in Munich, Germany:
    - Final: (Czech Republic) **Tomáš Berdych** def. (Russia) Mikhail Youzhny, 6–4, 4–6, 7–6(5)
      - Berdych wins his 5th career title.
  - Serbia Open in Belgrade, Serbia:
    - Final: (Serbia) **Novak Djokovic** def. (Poland) Łukasz Kubot, 6–3, 7–6(0)
      - Djokovic wins his second title of the year and 13th of his career.

=== May 9, 2009 (Saturday) ===
==== Auto racing ====
- Sprint Cup Series:
  - Southern 500 in Darlington, South Carolina
    - (1) Mark Martin (Arkansas) (Hendrick Motorsports) (2) Jimmie Johnson (California) (Hendrick Motorsports) (3) Tony Stewart (Indiana) (Stewart Haas Racing)
      - Drivers' standings after 11 races: (1) Jeff Gordon (California) 1601 points (2) Stewart −29 (3) Kurt Busch (Nevada) −55
  - Other news:
    - Driver/owner Jeremy Mayfield is suspended indefinitely under NASCAR's substance abuse policy after a positive drug test following last weekend's race at Richmond. (ESPN)
- IndyCar Series:
  - Indianapolis 500 qualifying in Speedway, Indiana
    - Hélio Castroneves (Brazil) claims pole position for the third time in his career. He will be joined on the front row by Ryan Briscoe (Australia) and Dario Franchitti (Scotland) .

==== Basketball ====
- NBA playoffs (seeding in parentheses):
  - Eastern Conference Semifinals:
    - Game 3 in Atlanta: (1) Cleveland Cavaliers 97, (4) Atlanta Hawks 82. **Cavaliers lead series 3–0.**
      - LeBron James scores 47 points and grabs 12 rebounds for his fifth double-double game of the playoffs and puts the Cavs within one win of the conference finals after their seventh straight win by a double-digit margin.
  - Western Conference Semifinals:
    - Game 3 in Dallas: (2) Denver Nuggets 106, (6) Dallas Mavericks 105. **Nuggets lead series 3–0.**
      - A three-pointer with a second left by Carmelo Anthony, who scores 31 points, give the Nuggets their first 3–0 series lead in franchise history. Chauncey Billups leads the Nuggets with 32 points, while Dirk Nowitzki scores 33 for Dallas.

==== Cycling ====
- Giro d'Italia:
  - Stage 1 (TTT): (1) Team Columbia–High Road 21' 50" (2) Garmin–Slipstream + 6" (3) Astana + 13"

==== Field hockey ====
- Men's Asia Cup in Kuantan, Malaysia:
  - Pool A:
    - South Korea 1–1 Malaysia
    - Japan 5–0 Bangladesh
  - Pool B:
    - Pakistan 1–1 China

==== Football (soccer) ====
- European domestic (national) competitions: (listed in countries alphabetic order)
  - (England) English Premier League, matchday 36 of 38:
    - Liverpool wins 3–0 over West Ham and goes ahead of Manchester United on goal difference. United can regain 3 points lead if they beat crosstown rival City on Sunday.
  - (France) French Cup Final in Saint Denis:
    - Rennes 1–2 **Guingamp**
      - Unfancied Ligue 2 team Guingamp rallies from a goal down with two strikes by Eduardo to beat Brittany rival Rennes and win its first ever trophy, in the first final since 1956 which features two teams from the same region.
  - (Scotland) Scottish Premier League, matchday 35 of 38:
    - Rangers' 1–0 win over Celtic gives them two points lead over their Old Firm rival, with 3 matches remaining.
  - (Spain) Spanish La Liga, matchday 35 of 38:
    - Valencia 3–0 Real Madrid
      - Barcelona can clinch the title on Sunday with a win over Villarreal.
- Arab Champions League Final, first leg:
  - Wydad Casablanca (Morocco) 0–1 (Tunisia) Espérance Sportive de Tunis

==== Ice hockey ====
- Stanley Cup playoffs (seeding in parentheses):
  - Eastern Conference Semifinals:
    - Game 5 in Washington: (4) Pittsburgh Penguins 4, (2) Washington Capitals 3 (OT). **Penguins lead series 3–2.**
      - The Penguins win third straight game after trailing 0–2 in the series.
  - Western Conference Semifinals:
    - Game 5 in Vancouver: (4) Chicago Blackhawks 4, (3) Vancouver Canucks 2. **Blackhawks lead series 3–2.**

==== Rugby union ====
- 2011 Rugby World Cup – Europe qualification:
  - Israel 26–19 Slovenia
    - Israel wins its first ever World Cup qualifying match, and will next play against Lithuania on May 23.

==== Shooting ====
- ISSF World Cup in Cairo, Egypt: (Qualification scores in parentheses)
  - Men's skeet: (gold) Mykola Milchev (Ukraine) 148 (125 **EWR**) (silver) Ennio Falco (Italy) 147 (123) (bronze) Marko Kemppainen (Finland) 146 (122)
    - In the qualification round, 2000 Olympic champion Milchev shot a perfect 125 to equal Vincent Hancock's and Tore Brovold's world record.

==== Tennis ====
- WTA Tour:
  - Internazionali BNL d'Italia in Rome, Italy:
    - Final: (Russia) **Dinara Safina** def. (Russia) Svetlana Kuznetsova, 6–3, 6–2
      - Safina avenges her loss to Kuznetsova in the final at Stuttgart last week for her 10th career title and the first since last September.
  - Estoril Open in Estoril, Portugal
    - Final: (Belgium) **Yanina Wickmayer** def. (Russia) Ekaterina Makarova, 7–5, 6–2
      - Wickmayer wins her first WTA Tour title.

=== May 8, 2009 (Friday) ===
==== Auto racing ====
- Nationwide Series:
  - Diamond Hill Plywood 200 in Darlington, South Carolina:
    - (1) Matt Kenseth (Wisconsin) (Roush Fenway Racing) (2) Jason Leffler (California) (Braun Racing) (3) Carl Edwards (Missouri) (Roush Fenway Racing)

==== Baseball ====
- Major League Baseball
  - The Arizona Diamondbacks make the first managerial change of the season, firing Bob Melvin and replacing him with A. J. Hinch.

==== Basketball ====
- NBA playoffs (seeding in parentheses)
  - Eastern Conference Semifinals:
    - Game 3 in Orlando: (3) Orlando Magic 117, (2) Boston Celtics 96. **Magic lead series 2–1.**
  - Western Conference Semifinals:
    - Game 3 in Houston: (1) Los Angeles Lakers 108, (5) Houston Rockets 94. **Lakers lead series 2–1.**

==== Cricket ====
- West Indies in England:
  - 1st Test in Lord's, London, day 3:
    - England 377 and 32/0; West Indies 152 and 256 (f/o). **England win by 10 wickets, lead 2-match series 1–0**.

==== Ice hockey ====
- Stanley Cup playoffs (seeding in parentheses):
  - Eastern Conference Semifinals:
    - Game 4 in Raleigh: (6) Carolina Hurricanes 4, (1) Boston Bruins 1. **Hurricanes lead series 3–1.**
    - Game 4 in Pittsburgh: (4) Pittsburgh Penguins 5, (2) Washington Capitals 3. **Series tied 2–2.**
- World Championship in Berne, Switzerland:
  - Semifinals:
    - **Russia** 3–2 United States
    - **Canada** 3–1 Sweden
      - Canada and Russia will meet in a repeat of last year's final on May 10.

==== Shooting ====
- ISSF World Cup in Cairo, Egypt: (Qualification scores in parentheses)
  - Women's skeet: (gold) Danka Barteková (Slovakia) 97+2 (72) (silver) Sutiya Jiewchaloemmit 97+1 (74 **EWR**) (bronze) Connie Smotek (United States) 95 (70)
    - In the qualification round, Thailand's Jiewchaloemmit equalled the world record, hitting 74 of 75 targets.

==== Water polo ====
- World League:
  - Preliminary round, Europe group C, matchday 5 of 6:
    - ~~Russia~~ – ~~Spain~~

=== May 7, 2009 (Thursday) ===
==== Baseball ====
- Major League Baseball news:
  - Los Angeles Dodgers slugger Manny Ramirez is suspended for 50 games for violation of MLB's drug policy. ESPN reports that Ramirez tested positive for artificial testosterone and human chorionic gonadotropin. (ESPN)

==== Basketball ====
- NBA playoffs (seeding in parentheses):
  - Eastern Conference Semifinals:
    - Game 2 in Cleveland: (1) Cleveland Cavaliers 105, (4) Atlanta Hawks 85. **Cavaliers lead series 2–0.**

==== Cricket ====
- West Indies in England:
  - 1st Test in Lord's, London, day 2:
    - England 377 (Ravi Bopara 143); West Indies 152 and 39/2 (f/o). West Indies trail by 186 runs with 8 wickets remaining.
- Australia vs Pakistan in UAE:
  - Twenty20 in Dubai:
    - Australia 108 (19.5 overs); Pakistan 109/3. **Pakistan win by 7 wickets**.

==== Football (soccer) ====
- UEFA Cup Semifinals, second leg: (first leg result in parentheses)
  - Shakhtar Donetsk (Ukraine) 2–1 (1–1) (Ukraine) Dynamo Kyiv. **Donetsk win 3–2 on aggregate.**
    - Shakhtar Donetsk reach the first European final in its history.
  - Hamburg (Germany) 2–3 (1–0) (Germany) Werder Bremen. **Aggregate score 3–3. Bremen win on away goals.**
    - Bremen, winner of the now-defunct UEFA Cup Winners' Cup in 1992, reach a European final for the second time.
- Copa Libertadores Round of 16, first leg:
  - Deportivo Cuenca (Ecuador) 2–1 (Venezuela) Caracas
  - Estudiantes (Argentina) 3–0 (Paraguay) Libertad
  - Universidad de Chile 1–2 (Brazil) Cruzeiro

==== Ice hockey ====
- Stanley Cup playoffs (seeding in parentheses):
  - Western Conference Semifinals:
    - Game 4 in Chicago: (4) Chicago Blackhawks 2, (3) Vancouver Canucks 1 (OT). **Series tied 2–2.**
    - Game 4 in Anaheim: (2) Detroit Red Wings 6, (8) Anaheim Ducks 3. **Series tied 2–2.**
- World Championship in Berne, Switzerland:
  - Quarterfinals:
    - **Canada** 4–2 Latvia
    - **Sweden** 3–1 Czech Republic
      - Canada and Sweden will meet in the semifinals on May 8.

==== Tennis ====
- News:
  - The father of Serbian-Australian player Jelena Dokić is arrested in Serbia for an alleged bomb threat against the Australian ambassador to Serbia, not long after his daughter told an Australian magazine that he had physically abused her during her early days on the tennis circuit. (The Times)

=== May 6, 2009 (Wednesday) ===
==== Basketball ====
- NBA playoffs: (Seeding in parentheses)
  - Eastern Conference Semifinals:
    - Game 2 in Boston: (2) Boston Celtics 112, (3) Orlando Magic 94. **Series tied 1–1.**
      - Rajon Rondo scores a triple-double (15 points, 18 assists, 11 rebounds) for the third time this postseason, the first NBA player since Jason Kidd in 2002 and the second Celtics player beside Larry Bird to do so. The Celtics also get a playoff career-high 31 points from Eddie House, while Dwight Howard and Rashard Lewis both score double-doubles for the Magic, who never led in the game.
  - Western Conference Semifinals:
    - Game 2 in Los Angeles: (1) Los Angeles Lakers 111, (5) Houston Rockets 98. **Series tied 1–1.**
      - Kobe Bryant scores 40 points for the Lakers, his seventh 40-point playoff game. The Lakers' Derek Fisher and Rockets' Ron Artest, who leads his team with 25 points, are both ejected and five technical fouls are called.

==== College sports ====
- News:
  - Six former University of Toledo athletes, three each from the school's football and basketball programs, are indicted in federal court in Detroit on charges related to an alleged point shaving scheme. (ESPN)

==== Cricket ====
- West Indies in England:
  - 1st Test in Lord's, London, day 1:
    - England 289/7 (Ravi Bopara 118*)

==== Football (soccer) ====
- UEFA Champions League Semifinals, second leg: (first leg result in parentheses)
  - Chelsea (England) 1–1 (0–0) (Spain) **Barcelona**. **Aggregate score 1–1. Barcelona win on away goals**.
    - Chelsea lead by Michael Essien's goal in the 9th minute, until 3 minutes into injury time, when Andrés Iniesta scores from 20 meters to lift Barça to the final against Manchester United.
- Copa Libertadores Round of 16, first leg:
  - Universidad San Martín (Peru) 1–3 (Brazil) Grêmio
- AFC Champions League group stage, matchday 5: (teams in **bold** advance to the round of 16, teams in ~~strike~~ are eliminated)
  - Group A:
    - ~~Saba Battery~~ (Iran) 0–1 (Saudi Arabia) **Al-Hilal**
    - **Pakhtakor Tashkent** (Uzbekistan) 2–0 (United Arab Emirates) ~~Al-Ahli~~
  - Group B:
    - **Al-Shabab** (Saudi Arabia) 1–0 (Qatar) ~~Al-Gharafa~~
    - **Persepolis** (Iran) also advance as a result of Al-Gharafa's loss.
  - Group E:
    - **Nagoya Grampus** (Japan) 4–1 (South Korea) Ulsan Hyundai Horang-i
    - Newcastle United Jets (Australia) 2–1 (China) ~~Beijing Guoan~~
  - Group F:
    - Shandong Luneng (China) 0–1 (Japan) **Gamba Osaka**

==== Ice hockey ====
- Stanley Cup playoffs: (Seeding in parentheses)
  - Eastern Conference Semifinals:
    - Game 3 in Pittsburgh: (4) Pittsburgh Penguins 3, (2) Washington Capitals 2 (OT). **Capitals lead series 2–1.**
    - Game 3 in Raleigh: (6) Carolina Hurricanes 3, (1) Boston Bruins 2 (OT). **Hurricanes lead series 2–1.**
- World Championship in Berne, Switzerland:
  - Quarterfinals:
    - **Russia** 4–3 Belarus
    - Finland 2–3 **United States**
      - Russia and USA will meet in the semi-finals on May 8.

==== Shooting ====
- ISSF World Cup in Cairo, Egypt: (Qualification scores in parentheses)
  - Men's double trap: (gold) Francesco D'Aniello (Italy) 185 (140) (silver) Rashid al-Athba (Qatar) 183 (139) (bronze) Roland Gerebics (Hungary) 182 (136)

=== May 5, 2009 (Tuesday) ===
==== Basketball ====
- NBA playoffs: (Seeding in parentheses)
  - Eastern Conference Semifinals:
    - Game 1 in Cleveland: (1) Cleveland Cavaliers 99, (4) Atlanta Hawks 72. **Cavaliers lead series 1–0.**
  - Western Conference Semifinals:
    - Game 2 in Denver: (2) Denver Nuggets 117, (6) Dallas Mavericks 105. **Nuggets lead series 2–0.**
- Other news:
  - Hall of Famer and former Detroit Pistons player Dave Bing will serve the remainder of former Detroit mayor Kwame Kilpatrick's term after winning a special election. (ESPN)

==== Football (soccer) ====
- UEFA Champions League Semifinals, second leg: (first leg result in parentheses)
  - Arsenal (England) 1–3 (0–1) (England) Manchester United. **Manchester United win 4–1 on aggregate**
    - Manchester United are the first defending champions to reach the final since Juventus in 1997. If they win the final, United will become the first champion to defend its title since A.C. Milan in 1990.
- Copa Libertadores Round of 16, first leg:
  - Palmeiras (Brazil) 1–0 (Brazil) Sport Recife
- AFC Champions League group stage, matchday 5: (teams in **bold** advance to the round of 16, teams in ~~strike~~ are eliminated)
  - Group C:
    - ~~Esteghlal~~ (Iran) 1–1 (Saudi Arabia) **Al-Ittihad**
    - **Umm-Salal** (Qatar) 2–2 (United Arab Emirates) ~~Al-Jazira~~
  - Group D:
    - Al-Shabab Al-Arabi (United Arab Emirates) 2–1 (Iran) ~~Sepahan~~
    - **Al-Ettifaq** (Saudi Arabia) 4–0 (Uzbekistan) Bunyodkor
  - Group F:
    - Seoul (South Korea) 5–1 (Indonesia) ~~Sriwijaya~~
  - Group G:
    - **Kashima Antlers** (Japan) 3–0 (South Korea) Suwon Bluewings
    - ~~Singapore Armed Forces~~ 1–1 (China) Shanghai Shenhua
  - Group H:
    - **Pohang Steelers** (South Korea) 3–2 (Australia) ~~Central Coast Mariners~~
    - ~~Tianjin Teda~~ (China) 3–1 (Japan) **Kawasaki Frontale**

==== Ice hockey ====
- Stanley Cup playoffs: (Seeding in parentheses)
  - Western Conference Semifinals:
    - Game 3 in Anaheim: (8) Anaheim Ducks 2, (2) Detroit Red Wings 1. **Ducks lead series 2–1.**
    - Game 3 in Chicago: (3) Vancouver Canucks 3, (4) Chicago Blackhawks 1. **Canucks lead series 2–1.**
- NHL news:
  - The Phoenix Coyotes file for Chapter 11 bankruptcy in federal court. Research In Motion CEO Jim Balsillie offers to buy the Coyotes for US$212.5 million and move the team to Hamilton, returning it to Canada 13 years after the franchise left Winnipeg. (ESPN)

==== Table Tennis ====
- World Championships in Yokohama, Japan: (seeding in parentheses)
  - Men singles final: Wang Hao (China) (1) bt Wang Liqin (China) (5) 4–0 (11–9, 13–11, 11–5, 11–9)
  - Women singles final: Zhang Yining (China) (1) bt Guo Yue (China) (2) 4–2 (10–12, 3–11, 11–2, 11–7, 11–7, 11–9)

==== Water polo ====
- World League:
  - Preliminary round, Europe group A, matchday 5:
    - ~~France~~ 9–12 Greece
      - France is eliminated.
  - Preliminary round, Europe group B:
    - ~~Romania~~ 9–11 **Montenegro**
      - Romania is eliminated. Italy receives the group's place in the Super Final, as Montenegro was automatically qualified as the host.
  - Preliminary round, Europe group C:
    - ~~Germany~~ 5–11 **Croatia**
      - Croatia clinches the group's qualifying place.

=== May 4, 2009 (Monday) ===
==== Basketball ====
- NBA playoffs: (Seeding in parentheses)
  - Eastern Conference Semifinals:
    - Game 1 in Boston: (3) Orlando Magic 95, (2) Boston Celtics 90. **Magic lead series 1–0.**
  - Western Conference Semifinals:
    - Game 1 in Los Angeles: (5) Houston Rockets 100, (1) Los Angeles Lakers 92. **Rockets lead series 1–0.**
- NBA awards:
  - NBA Most Valuable Player: LeBron James, Cleveland Cavaliers

==== Football (soccer) ====
- FA Women's Cup Final in Derby, England:
  - **Arsenal** 2–1 Sunderland
    - Arsenal win the FA Women's Cup for the fourth successive year and a record tenth time.
- (Wales) Welsh Cup Final in Llanelli:
  - Aberystwyth Town 0–2 **Bangor City**
    - Bangor wins the Cup for the second consecutive year and the sixth time in its history.

==== Ice hockey ====
- Stanley Cup playoffs: (Seeding in parentheses)
  - Eastern Conference Semifinals:
    - Game 2 in Washington: (2) Washington Capitals 4, (4) Pittsburgh Penguins 3. **Capitals lead series 2–0.**
      - The Capitals' Alex Ovechkin and the Penguins' Sidney Crosby both score hat tricks.
- World Championship in Berne and Kloten, Switzerland: (teams in **bold** advance to the quarterfinals, teams in ~~strike~~ are eliminated)
  - Group E:
    - **Sweden** 6–3 ~~France~~
      - Sweden secure 2nd place in the group, and will play against the Czech Republic in the quarterfinal.
    - **United States** 3–4 (OT) ~~Switzerland~~
      - The result gives Latvia a quarterfinal berth, while Switzerland is eliminated. The United States take third place in the group, with Latvia in fourth place.
      - Final standings: Russia 14 points, Sweden 10, USA 8, Latvia 7, Switzerland 6, France 0.
  - Group F:
    - ~~Slovakia~~ 3–2 (OT) ~~Norway~~
    - **Canada** 3–4 (SO) **Finland**
      - Canada earns the top spot in the group by forcing overtime, and will play against Latvia in the quarterfinal. Finland finish second and will meet USA.
      - Final standings: Canada 13 points, Finland 11, Czech Republic 9, Belarus 6, Slovakia 4, Norway 2.
  - Relegation Round: (teams in **bold** stay in top division, teams in ~~strike~~ are relegated to Division I)
    - ~~Hungary~~ 1–2 **Germany**
    - **Denmark** 5–2 ~~Austria~~
      - Final standings: Denmark 9 points, Austria 6, Germany 3, Hungary 0.
      - Denmark rallies from 2 goals down to win the game, and secure a place in the top Division next year as the group winner, along with the host Germany, while Austria and Hungary will play in Division I in 2010. Italy and Kazakhstan won promotion from Division I and will play in the top division next year.

==== Shooting ====
- ISSF World Cup in Cairo, Egypt: (Qualification scores in parentheses)
  - Men's trap: (gold) Ryan Hadden (United States) 139+3 (116) (silver) Jesús Serrano (Spain) 139+2 (118) (bronze) Khaled Almudhaf (Kuwait) 137 (118)

==== Snooker ====
- World Snooker Championship in Sheffield, England: (seeding in parentheses)
  - Final (best-of-35 frames): (5) **John Higgins** (Scotland) 18–9 (3) Shaun Murphy (England)
    - Higgins wins his third World Championship title.

==== Table tennis ====
- World Championships in Yokohama, Japan: (seeding in parentheses)
  - Men's doubles final: Chen Qi/Wang Hao (China) (1) bt Ma Long/Xu Xin (China) (2) 4–1 (6–11, 13–11, 13–11, 11–5, 11–9)
  - Women's doubles final: Guo Yue/Li Xiaoxia (China) (1) bt Ding Ning/Guo Yan (China) 4–1 (11–8, 12–10, 11–4, 3–11, 11–7)
  - China is guaranteed a clean sweep of all titles, as the men and women singles finals on May 5 will also be all-Chinese matches.

=== May 3, 2009 (Sunday) ===
==== Auto racing ====
- V8 Supercars:
  - Winton in Benalla, Victoria
    - Round 6: (1) Craig Lowndes (Australia) (2) Mark Winterbottom (Australia) (3) Garth Tander (Australia)
      - Standings (after 6 of 26 races): (1) Jamie Whincup (Australia) 804 points (2) Will Davison (Australia) 690 (3) Steven Johnson (Australia) 573
- A1 Grand Prix:
  - Grand Prix of Nations, Great Britain in Kent, United Kingdom
    - Sprint race: (1) (Republic of Ireland) Ireland (Adam Carroll) (2) India (Narain Karthikeyan) (3) Mexico (Salvador Durán)
    - Feature race: (1) Ireland (2) Netherlands (Robert Doornbos) (3) Switzerland (Neel Jani)
    - Final Standings: (1) Ireland 112 points (2) Switzerland 95 (3) Portugal 92
- World Touring Car Championship:
  - Race of Morocco in Marrakech, Morocco
    - Race 1: (1) Robert Huff (United Kingdom) (2) Gabriele Tarquini (Italy) (3) Jordi Gené (Spain)
    - Race 2: (1) Nicola Larini (Italy) (2) Yvan Muller (France) (3) Huff
      - Standings (after 6 of 24 races): (1) Muller 43 points (2) Tarquini 31 (3) Rickard Rydell (Sweden) 30
- FIA GT Championship:
  - RAC Tourist Trophy in Silverstone, United Kingdom
    - (1) Karl Wendlinger (Austria) & Ryan Sharp (United Kingdom) (2) Michael Bartels (Germany) & Andrea Bertolini (Italy) (3) Guillaume Moreau (France) & Xavier Maassen (Netherlands)

==== Basketball ====
- NBA playoffs: (Seeding in parentheses)
  - First round:
    - Game 7 in Atlanta: (4) Atlanta Hawks 91, (5) Miami Heat 78. **Hawks win series 4–3**.
      - The Hawks will play against the top-seeded Cleveland Cavaliers in the Conference Semifinals.
  - Western Conference Semifinals:
    - Game 1 in Denver: (2) Denver Nuggets 109, (6) Dallas Mavericks 95. **Nuggets lead series 1–0**.
- Euroleague Final Four in Berlin, Germany:
  - Final: **Panathinaikos** (Greece) 73–71 (Russia) CSKA Moscow
    - Panathinaikos survive CSKA rally after leading by 23 points, to win its fifth European title. Head coach Željko Obradović wins the trophy for a record 7th time.
  - 3rd place playoff: Olympiacos Piraeus (Greece) 79–95 (Spain) **Regal FC Barcelona**

==== Cricket ====
- Australia vs Pakistan in UAE:
  - 5th ODI in Abu Dhabi:
    - Australia 250/4 (50 ov, Shane Watson 116*); Pakistan 254/3 (47 ov, Kamran Akmal 116*). **Pakistan win by 7 wickets, Australia win 5-match series 3–2**.

==== Cycling ====
- UCI ProTour:
  - Tour de Romandie:
    - Stage 5: (1) Óscar Freire (Spain) (Rabobank) 3h 29' 49" (2) Tyler Farrar (United States) (Garmin–Slipstream) + 0" (3) Koldo Fernández (Spain) (Euskaltel–Euskadi) + 0"
    - Final General classification: (1) Roman Kreuziger (Czech Republic) (Liquigas) 14h 20' 14" (2) Vladimir Karpets (Russia) (Team Katusha) + 18" (3) Rein Taaramäe (Estonia) (Cofidis) + 25"

==== Football (soccer) ====
- OFC Champions League Final, second leg: (first leg result in parentheses)
  - **Auckland** 2–2 (7–2) (Solomon Islands) Koloale
    - Auckland win 9–4 on aggregate for its second title and 4th successive title for New Zealand teams.
- CAF Champions League second round, second leg: (first leg score in parentheses, winners advance to the group stage, losers go to CAF Confederation Cup)
  - **Al-Hilal** (Sudan) 2–0 (1–3) (Angola) Primeiro de Agosto
    - Al-Hilal win on away goals rule.
  - **Monomotapa United** (Zimbabwe) 2–0 (0–1) (Ivory Coast) ASEC Mimosas
- (Brazil) Brazilian football:
  - Rio de Janeiro Championship, second leg: (first leg result in parentheses)
    - **Flamengo** 2–2 (2–2) Botafogo. 4–4 on aggregate, Flamengo win 4–2 in penalty shootout.
  - São Paulo Championship, second leg: (first leg result in parentheses)
    - **Corinthians** 1–1 (3–1) Santos. Corinthians win 4–2 on aggregate.

==== Golf ====
- PGA Tour:
  - Quail Hollow Championship in Charlotte, North Carolina
    - Winner: Sean O'Hair (United States) 277 (−11)
- European Tour:
  - Open de España in Girona, Spain
    - Winner: Thomas Levet (France) 270 (−18)

==== Ice hockey ====
- Stanley Cup playoffs: (Seeding in parentheses)
  - Eastern Conference Semifinals:
    - Game 2 in Boston: (6) Carolina Hurricanes 3, (1) Boston Bruins 0. **Series tied 1–1.**
  - Western Conference Semifinals:
    - Game 2 in Detroit: (8) Anaheim Ducks 4, (2) Detroit Red Wings 3 (3OT). **Series tied 1–1**.
- World Championship in Berne and Kloten, Switzerland: (teams in **bold** advance to the quarterfinals, teams in ~~strike~~ are eliminated)
  - Group E:
    - Switzerland 1–4 **Sweden**
    - **Russia** 6–1 Latvia
  - Group F:
    - ~~Norway~~ 1–5 **Canada**
    - **Belarus** 0–3 **Czech Republic**
      - Czech Republic finish in 3rd place, Belarus in 4th. Canada will finish in 1st place unless they lose to Finland in regulation time, otherwise the Finns will top the group.
  - Relegation Round: (teams in **bold** stay in top division, teams in ~~strike~~ are relegated to Division I)
    - ~~Hungary~~ 1–5 Denmark
    - **Germany** 0–1 Austria
      - Germany will play in top Division in 2010 because they host the tournament. Austria and Denmark will battle for the last spot on May 4.

==== Motorcycle racing ====
- Moto GP:
  - Spanish motorcycle Grand Prix in Jerez de la Frontera, Spain
    - (1) Valentino Rossi (Italy) (2) Dani Pedrosa (Spain) (3) Casey Stoner (Australia)
      - Riders' standings after 3 of 17 races: (1) Rossi 65 points (2) Stoner 54 (3) Jorge Lorenzo (Spain) & Pedrosa 41

==== Rugby union ====
- Heineken Cup Semi-finals:
  - Cardiff Blues (Wales) 26–26 (aet) (England) **Leicester Tigers** in Cardiff—Leicester win 7–6 on goal kicks

==== Shooting ====
- ISSF World Cup in Cairo, Egypt: (Qualification scores in parentheses)
  - Women's trap: (gold) Daniela Del Din (San Marino) 89 (70) (silver) Jessica Rossi (Italy) 86 (70) (bronze) Rachael Lynn Heiden (United States) 81 (66)

==== Table Tennis ====
- World Championships in Yokohama, Japan: (seeding in parentheses)
  - Mixed doubles final: Li Ping/Cao Zhen (China) (20) bt Zhang Jike/Mu Zi (China) (27) 4–2 (11–6, 4–11, 11–7, 9–11, 13–11, 11–8)

==== Tennis ====
- ATP Tour:
  - Internazionali BNL d'Italia in Rome, Italy:
    - Final: (Spain) **Rafael Nadal** def. (Serbia) Novak Djokovic 7–6(2), 6–2
      - Nadal wins in Rome for the 4th time in 5 years, and his 3rd title in consecutive weeks. He also extends his winning streak on clay to 29 matches, and takes sole possession of 2nd place in career ATP Masters 1000 titles with 15 trophies, 2 less than Andre Agassi.
- WTA Tour:
  - Porsche Tennis Grand Prix in Stuttgart, Germany
    - Final: (Russia) **Svetlana Kuznetsova** def. (Russia) Dinara Safina, 6–4, 6–3
      - Kuznetsova wins her 10th career WTA Tour title and first since August 2007, ending a streak of 6 losses in finals.

=== May 2, 2009 (Saturday) ===
==== American football ====
- NFL news:
  - The roof of the Dallas Cowboys' practice facility in Irving, Texas collapses due to high winds. Twelve people are injured, including a scouting assistant who is paralyzed. (ESPN)

==== Auto racing ====
- Sprint Cup Series:
  - Crown Royal Presents the Russell Friedman 400 in Richmond, Virginia
    - (1) Kyle Busch (Nevada) (Joe Gibbs Racing) (2) Tony Stewart (Indiana) (Stewart Haas Racing) (3) Jeff Burton (Virginia) (Richard Childress Racing)
      - Drivers' standings after 10 races: (1) Jeff Gordon (California) 1441 points (2) Kurt Busch (Nevada) −10 (3) Stewart −39
- V8 Supercars:
  - Winton in Benalla, Victoria
    - Round 5: (1) Craig Lowndes (Australia) (2) Jamie Whincup (Australia) (3) Steven Richards (New Zealand)
      - Standings (after 5 of 26 races): (1) Whincup 738 points (2) Will Davison (Australia) 579 (3) Lee Holdsworth (Australia) 534

==== Basketball ====
- NBA playoffs first round: (Seeding in parentheses)
  - Game 7 in Boston: (2) Boston Celtics 109, (7) Chicago Bulls 99. **Celtics win series 4–3.**
    - The defending champion will next play against the Orlando Magic in the Conference semifinals, starting in Boston on May 4.

==== Boxing ====
- Ricky Hatton vs. Manny Pacquiao in Las Vegas: TV bouts:
  - (Philippines) Manny Pacquiao KOs (United Kingdom) Ricky Hatton in the 2nd round to win the IBO and The Ring light welterweight championships.
    - Hatton was knocked down thrice before the referee stopped the fight.
  - (Mexico) Humberto Soto TKOs (Canada) Benoit Gaudet in the 9th round to retain his WBC middleweight championship.
  - (United States) Daniel Jacobs def. (United States) Michael Walker via unanimous decision
  - (Russia) Matt Korobov TKOs (United States) Anthony Bartinelli
  - (Cuba) Erislandy Lara def. (United States) Chris Gray via unanimous decision
- News:
  - Floyd Mayweather Jr., who had retired undefeated in 2007 after defeating Hatton, announces he is coming out of retirement.

==== Cycling ====
- UCI ProTour:
  - Tour de Romandie:
    - Stage 4: (1) Roman Kreuziger (Czech Republic) (Liquigas) 4h 11' 44" (2) Rein Taaramäe (Estonia) (Cofidis) + 0" (3) Vladimir Karpets (Russia) (Team Katusha) + 7"
    - General classification: (1) Kreuziger 10h 50' 25" (2) Karpets + 18" (3) Taaramäe + 25"

==== Football (soccer) ====
- CAF Champions League second round, second leg: (first leg score in parentheses, winners advance to the group stage, losers go to CAF Confederation Cup)
  - Al Ahly (Egypt) 2–2 (1–1) (Nigeria) **Kano Pillars**
    - Kano Pillars win on away goals and knock out the defending champion.
  - Cotonsport (Cameroon) 1–1 (1–2) (Nigeria) **Heartland**
    - Last year's runner up is also eliminated by a Nigerian team.
  - **Étoile Sportive du Sahel** (Tunisia) 2–0 (0–0) (Libya) Al Ahly Tripoli
    - The 2007 champion is through to the last 8, a year after being ousted at this stage.
  - **ZESCO United** (Zambia) 2–1 (0–0) (Mali) Djoliba AC
    - ZESCO is the first ever Zambian team that reaches the group stage.
  - Ittihad Khemisset (Morocco) 0–0 (0–1) (Democratic Republic of the Congo) **TP Mazembe**
  - **Al-Merreikh** (Sudan) 1–1 (1–0) (Uganda) Kampala City Council
- (Greece) Greek Cup Final in Athens:
  - AEK Athens 4–4 (AET) **Olympiacos**. Olimpiacos win 15–14 in penalty shootout
    - 17 penalties for each team are required to decide the match. Olympiacos win the Cup for the 24th time and completes a league and cup double for the 4th time in 5 years.
- (Spain) El Clásico in Madrid:
  - Real Madrid 2–6 Barcelona
    - Barcelona score 6 goals in the Bernabéu for the first time in the rivalry's history, and extend their lead in La Liga to 7 points with 4 matches remaining.

==== Horse racing ====
- English Triple Crown
  - 2,000 Guineas Stakes in Newmarket: (1) Sea the Stars (2) Delegator (3) Gan Amhras
- U.S. Triple Crown
  - Kentucky Derby in Louisville, Kentucky: (1) Mine That Bird (2) Pioneerof the Nile (3) Musket Man
    - Mine That Bird is the biggest longshot to win the Derby since 1913.

==== Ice hockey ====
- Stanley Cup playoffs: (Seeding in parentheses)
  - Eastern Conference Semifinals:
    - Game 1 in Washington: (2) Washington Capitals 3, (4) Pittsburgh Penguins 2. **Capitals lead series 1–0**.
  - Western Conference Semifinals:
    - Game 2 in Vancouver: (4) Chicago Blackhawks 6, (3) Vancouver Canucks 3. **Series tied 1–1**.
- World Championship in Berne and Kloten, Switzerland: (teams in **bold** advance to the quarterfinals, teams in ~~strike~~ are eliminated)
  - Group E:
    - ~~France~~ 1–7 Latvia
    - **Russia** 4–1 United States
      - Russia secures first place in the group.
  - Group F:
    - Czech Republic 8–0 ~~Slovakia~~
    - **Finland** 1–2 (SO) Belarus

==== Rugby union ====
- Heineken Cup Semi-finals:
  - Munster 6–25 **Leinster** in Dublin
    - Leinster score three tries to Munster's none and eliminate the reigning champions, in a match watched by a crowd of 82,208, the largest ever to witness a club rugby match.

==== Tennis ====
- WTA Tour:
  - Grand Prix SAR La Princesse Lalla Meryem in Fes, Morocco:
    - Final: (Spain) **Anabel Medina Garrigues** def. (Russia) Ekaterina Makarova, 6–0, 6–1

=== May 1, 2009 (Friday) ===
==== Auto racing ====
- Nationwide Series:
  - Lipton Tea 250 in Richmond, Virginia
    - (1) Kyle Busch (Nevada) (Roush Fenway Racing) (2) Carl Edwards (Missouri) (Roush Fenway Racing) (3) Matt Kenseth (Wisconsin) (Roush Fenway Racing)

==== Basketball ====
- NBA playoffs first round (seeding in parentheses):
  - Game 6 in Miami: (5) Miami Heat 98, (4) Atlanta Hawks 72. **Series tied 3–3.**
    - Dwyane Wade leads the Heat to a blowout win with 41 points, and sends the series to a deciding game on May 3.
- Euroleague Final Four in Berlin, Germany:
  - Semifinals:
    - Regal FC Barcelona (Spain) 78–82 (Russia) **CSKA Moscow**
    - Olympiacos Piraeus (Greece) 82–84 (Greece) **Panathinaikos**
      - The last two champions, CSKA and Panathinaikos, will meet in a rematch of the final two years ago, won by Pana.

==== Cricket ====
- Australia vs Pakistan in UAE:
  - 4th ODI in Abu Dhabi:
    - Pakistan 197 (48.4 overs); Australia 200/2 (44.2 overs, Michael Clarke 100*). **Australia win by 8 wickets, and takes unassailable 3–1 lead in 5-match series**.

==== Cycling ====
- UCI ProTour:
  - Tour de Romandie:
    - Stage 3 (TTT): (1) Team Columbia–High Road 18' 37" (2) Caisse d'Epargne + 10" (3) Team Saxo Bank + 16"
    - General Classification after Stage 3: (1) František Raboň (Czech Republic) (Team Columbia–High Road) 6h 38' 17" (2) Lars Bak (Denmark) (Team Saxo Bank) + 1" (3) Tony Martin (Germany) (Team Columbia–High Road) + 8"

==== Ice hockey ====
- Stanley Cup playoffs: (Seeding in parentheses)
  - Eastern Conference Semifinals:
    - Game 1 in Boston: (1) Boston Bruins 4, (6) Carolina Hurricanes 1. **Bruins lead series 1–0**.
  - Western Conference Semifinals:
    - Game 1 in Detroit: (2) Detroit Red Wings 3, (8) Anaheim Ducks 2. **Red Wings lead series 1–0**.
      - Nicklas Lidström scores the game-winning goal for the Wings, his second goal of the game, with 49 seconds remaining.
- World Championship in Berne and Kloten, Switzerland: (Teams in **bold** advance to the quarterfinals)
  - Group E:
    - United States 6–2 France
      - This result secures **Russia'**s place in the quarterfinals.
  - Group F:
    - **Finland** 2–1 (OT) Slovakia
  - Relegation Round:
    - Germany 1–3 Denmark
    - Austria 6–0 Hungary
