= April 2009 in sports =

<<	April 2009					>>
Su	Mo	Tu	We	Th	Fr	Sa
			1	2	3	4
5	6	7	8	9	10	11
12	13	14	15	16	17	18
19	20	21	22	23	24	25
26	27	28	29	30
Sports

This list shows notable sports-related deaths, events, and notable outcomes that occurred in April of 2009.

== Deaths in April ==
- 9 : Nick Adenhart
- 13 : Mark Fidrych
- 13 : Harry Kalas
- 27 : Karl Mullen
- 27 : Greg Page

== Current sporting seasons ==
=== Australian rules football 2009 ===
- Australian Football League

=== Auto racing 2009 ===
- Formula One
- Sprint Cup
- IRL
- Nationwide Series
- Camping World Truck Series
- A1 Grand Prix
- WTTC
- V8 Supercar
- American Le Mans
- Le Mans Series
- Rolex Sports Car Series
- World Series by Renault
- Super GT

=== Baseball 2009 ===
- Major League Baseball
- Nippon Professional Baseball

=== Basketball 2008–09 ===
- American competitions:
  - NBA playoffs
- Pan-European competitions:
  - Euroleague
- Greece
- Iran
- Israel
- Italy
- Philippines
  - Fiesta Conference
- Spain
- Turkey

=== Football (soccer) ===
- 2008–09
  - 2010 FIFA World Cup qualification
  - UEFA (Europe) Champions League
  - UEFA Cup
  - Copa Libertadores (South America)
  - CONCACAF (North & Central America) Champions League
  - OFC (Oceania) Champions League
  - AFC (Asia) Champions League
  - CAF (Africa) Champions League
  - England
  - Germany
  - Iran
  - Italy
  - Spain
  - France
  - Argentina
- 2009
  - Major League Soccer
  - Japan
  - Women's Professional Soccer

=== Golf 2009 ===
- European Tour
- PGA Tour
- LPGA Tour

=== Ice hockey 2008–09 ===
- Stanley Cup playoffs

=== Motorcycle racing 2009 ===
- Superbike World Championship
- Supersport racing

=== Rugby league 2009 ===
- Super League
- NRL

=== Rugby union 2008–09 ===
- Heineken Cup
- English Premiership
- Celtic League
- Top 14
- Super 14
- Sevens World Series

== Days of the month ==
=== April 30, 2009 (Thursday) ===
==== Basketball ====
- NBA playoffs first round: (seeding in parentheses)
  - Game 6: (7) Chicago Bulls 128, (2) Boston Celtics 127 (3 OT). **Series tied 3–3.**
    - Derrick Rose's block of Rajon Rondo's fadeaway jumper with 7 seconds left in the third overtime gives the Bulls their third overtime win of the series to force a 7th game in Boston on May 2. Ray Allen scores a playoff career-high 51 points for the Celtics, who blow an 8-points lead with 3 minutes remaining in regulation time. John Salmons leads the Bulls with 35 points.
  - Game 6: (3) Orlando Magic 114, (6) Philadelphia 76ers 89. **Magic win series 4–2.**
    - The Magic, playing without the suspended Dwight Howard, hand the Sixers their worst playoff home defeat since 1970.
  - Game 6: (5) Houston Rockets 92, (4) Portland Trail Blazers 76. **Rockets win series 4–2.**
    - The Rockets win their first playoff series in 12 years, ending a streak of 7 series losses, while the Blazers lose their fifth straight playoff series. The Rockets will play against the Los Angeles Lakers in the Conference Semifinal.

==== Cycling ====
- UCI ProTour:
  - Tour de Romandie:
    - Stage 2: (1) Óscar Freire (Spain) (Rabobank) 4h 6' 56" (2) František Raboň (Czech Republic) (Team Columbia–High Road) s.t. (3) Assan Bazayev (Kazakhstan) (Astana) s.t.
    - General Classification: (1) Grégory Rast (Switzerland) (Astana) 6h 19' 13" (2) Ricardo Serrano (Spain) (Fuji–Servetto) + 5" (3) Lars Bak (Denmark) (Team Saxo Bank) + 12"

==== Football (soccer) ====
- UEFA Cup semifinals, first leg:
  - Dynamo Kyiv (Ukraine) 1–1 (Ukraine) Shakhtar Donetsk
  - Werder Bremen (Germany) 0–1 (Germany) Hamburg
- Copa Libertadores group stage: (Teams in **bold** advance to the last 16 stage; teams in ~~strike~~ are eliminated.)
  - Group 2:
    - ~~Guaraní~~ (Paraguay) 1–1 (Ecuador) **Deportivo Cuenca**
      - Thanks to Boca's win, Cuenca's draw is sufficient to send them through.
    - **Boca Juniors** (Argentina) 3–0 (Venezuela) ~~Deportivo Táchira~~
  - Group 3:
    - **Nacional** (Uruguay) 3–1 (Paraguay) ~~Nacional~~
    - ~~River Plate~~ (Argentina) 3–0 (Peru) **U. San Martín**

==== Ice hockey ====
- Stanley Cup playoffs: (seeding in parentheses)
  - Western Conference Semifinals:
    - Game 1: (3) Vancouver Canucks 5, (4) Chicago Blackhawks 3. **Canucks lead series 1–0.**
      - Sami Salo scores the game-winning goal for the Canucks with 1:13 left after the Blackhawks rally from 3 goals down to tie the score.
- World Championship in Berne and Kloten, Switzerland: (Teams in **bold** advance to the quarterfinals)
  - Group E:
    - Russia 6–5 (OT) Sweden
    - Switzerland 1–2 (SO) Latvia
  - Group F:
    - Belarus 3–2 (OT) Norway
    - **Canada** 5–1 Czech Republic

=== April 29, 2009 (Wednesday) ===
==== Basketball ====
- NBA playoffs first round: (seeding in parentheses)
  - Game 5: (4) Atlanta Hawks 106, (5) Miami Heat 91. **Hawks lead series 3–2.**
    - The Hawks make 12 consecutive field goal attempts in the second quarter to build a 23-point halftime lead, and cruise from there.
  - Game 5: (2) Denver Nuggets 107, (7) New Orleans Hornets 86. **Nuggets win series 4–1.**
    - Carmelo Anthony scores 34 points and leads the Nuggets to their first playoff series win in 15 years, and a matchup with the Dallas Mavericks in the second round.

==== Cycling ====
- UCI ProTour:
  - Tour de Romandie:
    - Stage 1: (1) Ricardo Serrano (Spain) (Fuji–Servetto) 2h 8' 35" (2) Lars Bak (Denmark) (Team Saxo Bank) s.t. (3) Grégory Rast (Switzerland) (Astana) s.t.
    - General classification: (1) Rast 2hr 12' 17" (2) Serrano + 5" (3) Bak + 12"

==== Football (soccer) ====
- UEFA Champions League Semifinals, first leg:
  - Manchester United (England) 1–0 (England) Arsenal
    - John O'Shea scores the winning goal in the 17th minute.
- Copa Libertadores group stage: (Teams in **bold** advance to the last 16 stage, teams in ~~strike~~ are eliminated)
  - Group 1:
    - ~~LDU Quito~~ (Ecuador) 2–3 (Brazil) **Sport Recife**
    - ~~Colo-Colo (Chile)~~ 0–1 (Brazil) **Palmeiras**
  - Group 6:
    - ~~Lanús~~ (Argentina) 1–1 (Venezuela) **Caracas**
    - ~~Everton~~ (Chile) 1–1 (Mexico) **Guadalajara**

==== Ice hockey ====
- World Championship in Berne and Kloten, Switzerland: (Teams in **bold** advance to the qualifying round)
  - Group C:
    - Austria 0–2 **Latvia**
    - **Sweden** 6–5 (OT) **United States**
      - Sweden rallies from 3 goals down with 10 minutes remaining in the 3rd period. USA still remain in first place with 7 points, followed by Sweden 6, Latvia 5, Austria 0.
  - Group D:
    - Denmark 4–5 (OT) **Norway**
    - **Finland** 4–3 **Czech Republic**
      - Standings: Finland 9 points, Czech Republic 6, Norway 2, Denmark 1.

==== Water polo ====
- World League:
  - Preliminary round, Europe group A, matchday 4 of 6:
    - France – Serbia

=== April 28, 2009 (Tuesday) ===
==== Basketball ====
- NBA playoffs first round: (seeding in parentheses)
  - Game 5: (2) Boston Celtics 106, (7) Chicago Bulls 104 (OT). **Celtics lead series 3–2.**
    - Paul Pierce scores with 10.5 seconds remaining in regulation to send the game to overtime, making it the first playoff series in history with three games going to overtime. Then he scores the game-winning basket with 3.4 seconds remaining in overtime. The Bulls' Brad Miller could have extended the game into a second overtime but miss from the free throw line.
  - Game 5: (3) Orlando Magic 91, (6) Philadelphia 76ers 78. **Magic lead series 3–2.**
    - Dwight Howard leads the Magic with 24 points and 24 rebounds, but he is later suspended from game 6 for hitting Samuel Dalembert with his elbow.
  - Game 5: (6) Dallas Mavericks 106, (3) San Antonio Spurs 93. **Mavericks win series 4–1.**
    - Dirk Nowitzki scores 31 points for his 30th 30-points playoff game and leads the Mavericks to the second round for the first time in 3 years, while the Spurs are eliminated in the first round for the first time since 2000.
  - Game 5: (4) Portland Trail Blazers 88, (5) Houston Rockets 77. **Rockets lead series 3–2.**
    - LaMarcus Aldridge and Brandon Roy score 25 points each and the Blazers make a 15–0 run in the fourth quarter to stay alive in the series.
- NBA awards:
  - NBA Sportsmanship Award: Chauncey Billups, Denver Nuggets

==== Cycling ====
- UCI ProTour:
  - Tour de Romandie:
    - Prologue (3.1 km): (1) František Raboň (Czech Republic) (Team Columbia–High Road) 3min 44.56sec, (2) Sandy Casar (France) (Française des Jeux) at 2sec, (3) Alejandro Valverde (Spain) (Caisse d'Epargne) 3sec

==== Football (soccer) ====
- UEFA Champions League Semifinals, first leg:
  - Barcelona (Spain) 0–0 (England) Chelsea
- Copa Libertadores group stage: (Teams in **bold** advance to the last 16 stage, teams in ~~strike~~ are eliminated)
  - Group 7:
    - ~~Aurora~~ (Bolivia) 1–2 **Universidad de Chile**
    - **Grêmio** (Brazil) 3–0 (Colombia) ~~Boyacá Chicó~~
  - Group 8:
    - ~~San Lorenzo~~ (Argentina) 2–0 (Peru) ~~Universitario~~
    - **Libertad** (Paraguay) 0–2 (Mexico) **San Luis**

==== Ice hockey ====
- Stanley Cup playoffs: (Seeding in parentheses)
  - Eastern Conference Quarterfinals:
    - Game 7, (2) Washington Capitals 2, (7) New York Rangers 1. **Capitals win series 4–3**.
      - Sergei Fedorov scores the game-winning goal with 4:39 left, making him the oldest player in history to score a game-winning goal in game 7. The Capitals will next play against the Pittsburgh Penguins.
    - Game 7, (6) Carolina Hurricanes 4, (3) New Jersey Devils 3. **Hurricanes win series 4–3**.
      - Jussi Jokinen and Eric Staal score for the Hurricanes in the last 1:20 to win the series and set up a second round series against the Boston Bruins.
- World Championship in Berne and Kloten, Switzerland: (Teams in **bold** advance to the qualifying round)
  - Group A:
    - Hungary 1–3 **Belarus**
    - **Canada** 7–3 **Slovakia**
      - Final standings: Canada 9 points, Belarus 5, Slovakia 4, Hungary 0.
  - Group B:
    - **Russia** 4–2 **Switzerland**
    - **France** 2–1 Germany
      - Final standings: Russia 9 points, Switzerland 5, France 3, Germany 1.

=== April 27, 2009 (Monday) ===
==== Basketball ====
- NBA playoffs first round: (seeding in parentheses)
  - Game 4: (4) Atlanta Hawks 81, (5) Miami Heat 71. **Series tied 2–2.**
    - The Hawks win their first playoff road game in 12 years.
  - Game 4: (2) Denver Nuggets 121, (7) New Orleans Hornets 63. **Nuggets lead series 3–1.**
    - The Nuggets tie the most lopsided win in playoff history, and are within one game of their first series win in 15 years.
  - Game 5: (1) Los Angeles Lakers 107, (8) Utah Jazz 96. **Lakers win series 4–1.**
    - Kobe Bryant gets another 30-point game, and Lamar Odom scores 26 points and grabs 15 rebounds as the Lakers close the series with their fourth double-digit win.

==== Cricket ====
- Australia vs Pakistan in UAE:
  - 3rd ODI in Abu Dhabi
    - Australia 198/7 (50 ov); Pakistan 171 (47.1 ov). **Australia win by 27 runs and lead 5-match series 2–1**.

==== Ice hockey ====
- Stanley Cup playoffs: (Seeding in parentheses)
  - Western Conference Quarterfinals:
    - Game 6, (4) Chicago Blackhawks 4, (5) Calgary Flames 1. **Blackhawks win series 4–2**.
      - The 'Hawks win their first playoff series in 13 years, and will next play the Vancouver Canucks.
    - Game 6, (8) Anaheim Ducks 4, (1) San Jose Sharks 1. **Ducks win series 4–2**.
      - The Sharks become the fourth Presidents' Trophy winner to be eliminated in the first round. The Ducks will next play against the defending champion Detroit Red Wings.
- World Championship in Berne and Kloten, Switzerland: (Teams in **bold** advance to the qualifying round)
  - Group C:
    - **United States** 6–1 Austria
    - Latvia 3–2 (SO) **Sweden**
  - Group D:
    - **Czech Republic** 5–2 Norway
    - **Finland** 5–1 Denmark

=== April 26, 2009 (Sunday) ===
==== Athletics ====
- London Marathon:
  - Men: (1) Sammy Wanjiru (Kenya) 2hrs 05 mins 10 sec (course record) (2) Tsegaye Kebede (Ethiopia) 2:05:20 (3) Jaouad Gharib (Morocco) 2:05:27
  - Women: (1) Irina Mikitenko (Germany) 2hrs 22mins 11sec (2) Mara Yamauchi (United Kingdom) 2:23:12 (3) Liliya Shobukhova (Russia) 2:24:24
- Hamburg Marathon:
  - Men: (1) Solomon Tside (Ethiopia) 2hrs 11mins 47 secs (2) Charles Ngolepus (Kenya) 2:13:25 (3) Jose Telles des Souza (Brazil) 2:14:46
  - Women: (1) Alessandra Aguilar (Spain) 2hrs 29mins 01 secs (2) Tigist Abdi Sheni (Ethiopia) 2:34:01 secs (3) Ulrike Maisch (Germany) 2:34:28

==== Auto racing ====
- Formula One:
  - Bahrain Grand Prix in Sakhir, Bahrain:
    - (1) Jenson Button (United Kingdom) (Brawn–Mercedes) (2) Sebastian Vettel (Germany) (Red Bull–Renault) (3) Jarno Trulli (Italy) (Toyota)
      - Drivers standings (after 4 of 17 races): (1) Button 31 points (2) Rubens Barrichello (Brazil) (Brawn-Mercedes) 19 (3) Vettel 18
- Sprint Cup Series:
  - Aaron's 499 in Talladega, Alabama:
    - (1) Brad Keselowski (Michigan) (Phoenix Racing) (2) Dale Earnhardt Jr. (North Carolina) (Hendrick Motorsports) (3) Ryan Newman (Indiana) (Stewart Haas Racing)
    - Keselowski collects his first career Cup win.
      - Drivers' standings after 9 races: (1) Kurt Busch (Nevada) 1299 points (2) Jeff Gordon (California) −5 (3) Jimmie Johnson (California) −64
- IndyCar Series:
  - RoadRunner Turbo Indy 300 in Kansas City, Kansas:
    - (1) Scott Dixon (New Zealand) (2) Hélio Castroneves (Brazil) (3) Tony Kanaan (Brazil)
      - Drivers standings (after 3 races): (1) Kanaan 100 points (2) Ryan Briscoe (Australia) 99 (3) Dario Franchitti (United Kingdom) 96
- World Rally Championship:
  - Rally Argentina:
    - (1) Sébastien Loeb (France) (2) Dani Sordo (Spain) (3) Henning Solberg (Norway)
      - Drivers standings (after 5 of 12 rallies): (1) Loeb 50 points (2) Sordo 31 (3) Mikko Hirvonen (Finland) 30

==== Basketball ====
- NBA playoffs first round (seeding in parentheses)
  - Game 4: (7) Chicago Bulls 121, (2) Boston Celtics 118 (2OT). **Series tied 2–2.**
    - The Bulls get their second win in overtime to tie the series.
  - Game 4: (1) Cleveland Cavaliers 99, (8) Detroit Pistons 78. **Cavaliers win series 4–0.**
    - The Cavaliers, led by 36 points by LeBron James, become the third team in history to sweep a 4-game series with double-digit wins in all games.
  - Game 4: (3) Orlando Magic 84, (6) Philadelphia 76ers 81. **Series tied 2–2.**
    - Hedo Türkoğlu scores a three-pointer with one second left to win the game for the Magic, who were led by Dwight Howard's 18 points and 18 rebounds.
  - Game 4: (5) Houston Rockets 89, (4) Portland Trail Blazers 88. **Rockets lead series 3–1.**
    - The Rockets, led by Yao Ming with 21 points and 12 rebounds, are within one game of their first series win in 11 years.
- FIBA EuroChallenge Final Four in Bologna, Italy:
  - Final: Cholet Basket (France) 75–77 (Italy) **Virtus Bologna**
  - 3rd place playoff: **BC Triumph** (Russia) 94–82 (Cyprus) Proteas EKA AEL

==== Cycling ====
- Monument Classics:
  - Liège–Bastogne–Liège:
    - (1) Andy Schleck (Luxembourg) (Team Saxo Bank) 6h 34' 32" (2) Joaquim Rodríguez (Spain) (Caisse d'Epargne) +1' 17" (3) Davide Rebellin (Italy) (Diquigiovanni–Androni) +1' 24"

==== Football (soccer) ====
- Rio de Janeiro Championship, first leg:
  - Botafogo 2–2 Flamengo
- São Paulo Championship, first leg:
  - Santos 1–3 Corinthians

==== Golf ====
- PGA Tour:
  - Zurich Classic of New Orleans in New Orleans, Louisiana
    - Winner: Jerry Kelly (United States) 274 (−14)
      - Kelly wins on tour for the first time since 2002, with Rory Sabbatini (South Africa) , Charlie Wi (South Korea) , and Charles Howell III (United States) one shot back.
- European Tour:
  - Ballantine's Championship in Jeju Island, South Korea
    - Winner: Thongchai Jaidee (Thailand) 284 (−4)
      - Thongchai wins in a three-way playoff over Gonzalo Fernández-Castaño (Spain) and Kang Sung-hoon (South Korea) .
- LPGA Tour:
  - Corona Championship in Morelia, Mexico
    - Winner: Lorena Ochoa (Mexico) 267 (−25)
      - The world's #1 player holds off Suzann Pettersen (Norway) for a one-shot win; no other golfer comes within seven shots.

==== Ice hockey ====
- Stanley Cup playoffs: (Seeding in parentheses)
  - Eastern Conference Quarterfinals:
    - Game 6, (2) Washington Capitals 5, (7) New York Rangers 3. **Series tied 3–3**.
    - Game 6, (6) Carolina Hurricanes 4, (3) New Jersey Devils 0. **Series tied 3–3**.
- World Championship in Berne and Kloten, Switzerland: (Teams in **bold** advance to the qualifying round)
  - Group A:
    - **Slovakia** 1–2 (SO) Belarus
    - **Canada** 9–0 Hungary
  - Group B:
    - **Switzerland** 3–2 (OT) Germany
    - **Russia** 7–2 France

==== Motorcycle racing ====
- Moto GP:
  - Japanese motorcycle Grand Prix in Motegi, Japan:
    - MotoGP: (1) Jorge Lorenzo (Spain) (Yamaha) 43:47.238 (2) Valentino Rossi (Italy) (Yamaha) +1.304 (3) Dani Pedrosa (Spain) (Honda) +3.763
      - Riders' standings after 2 of 17 races: (1) Lorenzo 41 points (2) Rossi 40 (3) Casey Stoner (Australia) (Ducati) 38
    - 250cc: (1) Álvaro Bautista (Spain) (Aprilia) 44:06.488 (2) Hiroshi Aoyama (Japan) (Honda) +5.889 (3) Mattia Pasini (Italy) (Aprilia) +21.832
      - Riders' standings: (1) Bautista 34 points (2) H. Aoyama 33 (3) Héctor Barberá (Spain) (Aprilia) 30
    - 125cc: (1) Andrea Iannone (Italy) (Aprilia) 42:23.716 (2) Julián Simón (Spain) (Aprilia) +1.346 (3) Pol Espargaró (Spain) (Derbi) +5.039
      - Riders' standings: (1) Iannone 37.5 points (2) Simón 30 (3) Espargaró 22.5
- Superbike World Championship:
  - Assen Superbike World Championship round in Assen, Netherlands:
    - Race 1: (1) Ben Spies (United States) (Yamaha YZF-R1) 36:31.338 (2) Noriyuki Haga (Japan) (Ducati 1098R) +0.154 (3) Leon Haslam (United Kingdom) (Honda CBR1000RR) +0.779
    - Race 2: (1) Haga 36:31.712 (2) Haslam +2.678 (3) Jakub Smrž (Czech Republic) (Ducati 1098R) +4.603
      - Riders' standings after 4 of 14 rounds: (1) Haga 180 points (2) Spies 120 (3) Haslam 94
    - Supersport: (1) Eugene Laverty (Republic of Ireland) (Honda CBR600RR) 35:45.160 (2) Cal Crutchlow (United Kingdom) (Yamaha YZF-R6) +0.107 (3) Joan Lascorz (Spain) (Kawasaki ZX-6R) +0.178
      - Riders standings: (1) Crutchlow 74 points (2) Laverty 68 (3) Kenan Sofuoğlu (Turkey) (Honda CBR600RR) 65

==== Tennis ====
- ATP Tour:
  - Torneo Godó in Barcelona, Spain:
    - Final: (Spain) **Rafael Nadal** def. (Spain) David Ferrer, 6–2, 7–5
      - Nadal wins his 4th title this year and 5th consecutive win at the event.
- Fed Cup:
  - World Group Semifinals, day 2:
    - **Italy** 4–1 Russia in Castellaneta, Italy
    - Czech Republic 2–3 **United States** in Brno, Czech Republic
      - Italy will host USA in the final on November 7–8.
  - World Group play-offs: (Winners advance to World Group in 2010, losers will play in World Group II)
    - Spain 0–4 **Serbia** in Lerida, Spain
    - **France** 3–2 Slovakia in Limoges, France
    - **Germany** 3–2 China in Frankfurt, Germany
    - Argentina 0–5 **Ukraine** in Mar del Plata, Argentina
      - Serbia and Ukraine both advance to the World Group for the first time, while Spain is relegated to World Group II for the first time.
  - World Group II play-offs: (Winners advance to World Group II in 2010, losers will play in zonal group I)
    - **Belgium** 3–2 Canada in Hasselt, Belgium
    - **Estonia** 3–2 Israel in Tallinn, Estonia
    - **Poland** 3–2 Japan in Gdynia, Poland
    - **Australia** 3–1 Switzerland in Mildura, Australia
      - Estonia and Poland both advance to World Group II for the first time.

=== April 25, 2009 (Saturday) ===
==== American football ====
- NFL draft in New York City
  - (1) Detroit Lions select Georgia quarterback Matthew Stafford
  - (2) St. Louis Rams select Baylor offensive tackle Jason Smith
  - (3) Kansas City Chiefs select LSU defensive end Tyson Jackson

==== Auto racing ====
- Nationwide Series:
  - Aaron's 312 in Talladega, Alabama
    - (1) David Ragan (Georgia (U.S. state)) (Roush Fenway Racing) (2) Ryan Newman (Indiana) (Kevin Harvick Incorporated) (3) Joey Logano (Connecticut) (Joe Gibbs Racing)

==== Basketball ====
- NBA playoffs first round (seeding in parentheses)
  - Game 3: (7) New Orleans Hornets 95, (2) Denver Nuggets 93. **Nuggets lead series 2–1.**
    - Chris Paul leads the Hornets with 32 points and 12 assists.
  - Game 4: (6) Dallas Mavericks 99, (3) San Antonio Spurs 90. **Mavericks lead series 3–1.**
    - The Mavericks, led by Josh Howard with 28 points, take a 3–1 lead in the series despite 43 points by Tony Parker for the Spurs.
  - Game 3: (5) Miami Heat 107, (4) Atlanta Hawks 78. **Heat lead series 2–1**.
    - Dwyane Wade leads the Heat to a blowout win with 29 points.
  - Game 4: (1) Los Angeles Lakers 108, (8) Utah Jazz 94. **Lakers lead series 3–1.**
    - Kobe Bryant scores 38 points for his 50th playoff 30-points game, and moves to 7th place in the all-time playoff scoring list. The series goes back to Los Angeles with the Lakers one win away from the second round.

==== Football (soccer) ====
- OFC Champions League Final, first leg:
  - Koloale (Solomon Islands) 2–7 (New Zealand) Auckland City
- French League Cup Final in Saint-Denis:
  - Bordeaux 4–0 Vannes

==== Ice hockey ====
- Stanley Cup playoffs (seeding in parentheses)
  - Eastern Conference Quarterfinals:
    - Game 6: (4) Pittsburgh Penguins 5, (5) Philadelphia Flyers 3. **Penguins win series 4–2.**
      - The Penguins rally from 3 goals down to clinch the series.
  - Western Conference Quarterfinals:
    - Game 5: (1) San Jose Sharks 3, (8) Anaheim Ducks 2 (OT). **Ducks lead series 3–2.**
      - Patrick Marleau scores 6:02 into overtime to keep the Sharks alive in the series.
    - Game 5: (4) Chicago Blackhawks 5, (5) Calgary Flames 1. **Blackhawks lead series 3–2**.
      - The 'Hawks are one win away from their first series win in 13 years.
- World Championship in Berne and Kloten, Switzerland:
  - Group C:
    - **United States** 4–2 Latvia
    - **Sweden** 7–1 Austria
  - Group D:
    - Norway 0–5 **Finland**
    - **Czech Republic** 5–0 Denmark

==== Tennis ====
- Fed Cup:
  - World Group Semifinals, day 1:
    - Italy 2–0 Russia in Castellaneta, Italy
    - Czech Republic 1–1 United States in Brno, Czech Republic
  - World Group play-offs:
    - Spain 0–2 Serbia in Lerida, Spain
    - France 1–1 Slovakia in Limoges, France
    - Germany 2–0 China in Frankfurt, Germany
    - Argentina 0–2 Ukraine in Mar del Plata, Argentina
  - World Group II play-offs:
    - Belgium 1–1 Canada in Hasselt, Belgium
    - Estonia 1–1 Israel in Tallinn, Estonia
    - Poland 1–1 Japan in Gdynia, Poland
    - Australia 2–0 Switzerland in Mildura, Australia

=== April 24, 2009 (Friday) ===
==== American football ====
- NFL draft news:
  - ESPN reports that the Detroit Lions will make Georgia quarterback Matthew Stafford the first overall pick after both agree on a six-year, US$72 million deal. (ESPN)

==== Basketball ====
- NBA playoffs first round (seeding in parentheses)
  - Game 3: (1) Cleveland Cavaliers 79, (8) Detroit Pistons 68. **Cavaliers lead series 3–0.**
    - The Cavs make an 18–2 run in the fourth quarter to get within one game of a series victory.
  - Game 3: (6) Philadelphia 76ers 96, (3) Orlando Magic 94. **76ers lead series 2–1.**
    - The Magic rally from 17 points deficit to level the score, but Thaddeus Young scores with 2 seconds remaining to give the win to the Sixers.
  - Game 3: (5) Houston Rockets 86, (4) Portland Trail Blazers 83. **Rockets lead series 2–1.**
- NBA awards:
  - J. Walter Kennedy Citizenship Award: Dikembe Mutombo, Houston Rockets
    - Mutombo, who announced his retirement following a knee injury suffered in Game 2 of the Blazers-Rockets series, becomes the first player ever to win the award twice.
- FIBA EuroChallenge Final Four in Bologna, Italy:
  - Semifinals:
    - Cholet Basket (France) 81–78 (Russia) BC Triumph
    - Virtus Bologna (Italy) 83–69 (Cyprus) Proteas EKA AEL

==== Cricket ====
- Australia vs Pakistan in UAE:
  - 2nd ODI in Dubai
    - Pakistan 207 (46.2 ov); Australia 208/4 (45.1 ov). **Australia win by 6 wickets and levels 5-match series 1–1**.

==== Ice hockey ====
- Stanley Cup playoffs: (Seeding in parentheses)
  - Eastern Conference Quarterfinals:
    - Game 5, (2) Washington Capitals 4, (7) New York Rangers 0. **Rangers lead series 3–2**.
      - The Caps get their second 4–0 shutout of the series.
- World Championship in Berne and Kloten, Switzerland:
  - Group A:
    - Belarus 1–6 **Canada**
    - **Slovakia** 4–3 Hungary
  - Group B:
    - Germany 0–5 **Russia**
    - **Switzerland** 1–0 France

=== April 23, 2009 (Thursday) ===
==== Basketball ====
- NBA playoffs first round (seeding in parentheses)
  - Game 3: (2) Boston Celtics 107, (7) Chicago Bulls 86. **Celtics lead series 2–1.**
    - Paul Pierce scores 24 points to lead the Celtics to an easy win in Chicago.
  - Game 3: (6) Dallas Mavericks 88, (3) San Antonio Spurs 67. **Mavericks lead series 2–1.**
    - The Spurs' 67 points are their lowest score in franchise playoff history.
  - Game 3: (8) Utah Jazz 88, (1) Los Angeles Lakers 86. **Lakers lead series 2–1.**
    - Deron Williams scores the winning basket for the Jazz with 2.2 seconds left.

==== Football (soccer) ====
- Copa Libertadores group stage: (Teams in **bold** advance to the last 16 stage, teams in ~~strike~~ are eliminated)
  - Group 2:
    - Deportivo Cuenca (Ecuador) 1–0 (Argentina) Boca Juniors
      - Boca Juniors miss a chance to secure their place in the last 16, but remain in pole position in the group with 12 points from 5 games, ahead of Deportivo Cuenca and Deportivo Táchira with 9.
  - Group 3:
    - ~~Nacional~~ (Paraguay) 4–2 (Argentina) ~~River Plate~~
      - River Plate's loss secures **Universidad San Martín** a berth in the last 16.

==== Ice hockey ====
- Stanley Cup playoffs (seeding in parentheses)
  - Eastern Conference Quarterfinals:
    - Game 5: (3) New Jersey Devils 1, (6) Carolina Hurricanes 0. **Devils lead series 3–2.**
      - Goaltender Martin Brodeur shakes off a first-period skate cut on his ankle and collects his 23rd playoff shutout, tying Patrick Roy's record.
    - Game 5: (5) Philadelphia Flyers 3, (4) Pittsburgh Penguins 0. **Penguins lead series 3–2.**
  - Western Conference Quarterfinals:
    - Game 4: (8) Anaheim Ducks 4, (1) San Jose Sharks 0. **Ducks lead series 3–1.**
      - Jonas Hiller makes his second shutout of the series.
    - Game 4: (2) Detroit Red Wings 6, (7) Columbus Blue Jackets 5. **Red Wings win series 4–0.**
      - Johan Franzen scores the game-winning goal with 47 seconds left to play to wrap up the series for the Red Wings, who become the first defending champion in seven years that advances to the second round.

==== Shooting ====
- ISSF World Cup in Beijing, China: (qualification scores in parentheses)
  - Men's 50 metre rifle three positions: (gold) Ole Magnus Bakken (Norway) 1276.7 (1179) (silver) Rajmond Debevec (Slovenia) 1275.9 (1180) (bronze) Stevan Pletikosić (Serbia) 1271.4 (1173)

=== April 22, 2009 (Wednesday) ===
==== Basketball ====
- NBA playoffs first round: (Seeding in parentheses)
  - Game 2, (3) Orlando Magic 96, (6) Philadelphia 76ers 87. **Series tied 1–1**.
  - Game 2, (5) Miami Heat 108, (4) Atlanta Hawks 93. **Series tied 1–1**.
    - Dwyane Wade's 33 points lead the Heat to their first playoff win since the 2006 NBA Finals.
  - Game 2, (2) Denver Nuggets 108, (7) New Orleans Hornets 93. **Nuggets lead series 2–0**.
    - Chauncey Billups scores 31 points to add to 36 he scored in game 1, and the Nuggets win two games in a playoff series for the first time in 15 years.
- NBA awards:
  - Rookie of the Year: Derrick Rose, Chicago Bulls
  - Sixth Man of the Year: Jason Terry, Dallas Mavericks

==== Cricket ====
- Australia vs Pakistan in UAE:
  - 1st ODI in Dubai:
    - Australia 168 (38.5 ov); Pakistan 171/6 (44.1 ov). **Pakistan win by 4 wickets, lead 5-match series 1–0**.

==== Cycling ====
- La Flèche Wallonne:
  - (1) Davide Rebellin (Italy) (Diquigiovanni–Androni) 4hr 42min 15sec (2) Andy Schleck (Luxembourg) (Team Saxo Bank) at 0:02 (3) Damiano Cunego (Italy) (Lampre–NGC) 0:02

==== Football (soccer) ====
- Copa Libertadores group stage: (Teams in **bold** advance to the last 16 stage, teams in ~~strike~~ are eliminated)
  - Group 1:
    - **Sport Recife** (Brazil) 2–1 (Chile) Colo-Colo
      - Sport Recife's win secures them a berth in the last 16 and eliminates defending champion LDU Quito.
  - Group 4:
    - **São Paulo** (Brazil) 2–1 (Colombia) ~~América de Cali~~
    - **Defensor Sporting** (Uruguay) 4–3 (Colombia) ~~Independiente Medellín~~
      - Álvaro Navarro's goal in the 4th minute of injury time gives Defensor the win they need to advance to the last 16.
  - Group 5:
    - ~~Universitario de Sucre~~ (Bolivia) 0–0 (Argentina) **Estudiantes**
    - **Cruzeiro** (Brazil) 2–0 (Ecuador) ~~Deportivo Quito~~
- CONCACAF Champions League Final, first leg:
  - Cruz Azul (Mexico) 0–2 (Mexico) Atlante
- AFC Champions League group stage, matchday 4: (Teams in **bold** advance to the last 16 stage, teams in ~~strike~~ are eliminated)
  - Group A:
    - **Pakhtakor Tashkent** (Uzbekistan) 2–1 (Iran) Saba Battery
    - ~~Al-Ahli~~ (United Arab Emirates) 1–3 (Saudi Arabia) Al-Hilal
      - Pakhtakor lead the group with 10 points, ahead of Al-Hilal with 8.
  - Group C:
    - Esteghlal (Iran) 1–1 (Qatar) Umm-Salal
    - Al-Ittihad (Saudi Arabia) 1–1 (United Arab Emirates) Al-Jazira
      - Al-Ittihad lead the group with 8 points, followed by Umm-Salal with 7.
  - Group E:
    - Newcastle United Jets (Australia) 0–1 (Japan) Nagoya Grampus
    - Beijing Guoan (China) 0–1 (South Korea) Ulsan Hyundai Horang-i
      - Nagoya lead the group with 8 points, followed by Ulsan with 6.
  - Group G:
    - Kashima Antlers (Japan) 5–0 ~~Singapore Armed Forces~~
    - Suwon Bluewings (South Korea) 2–1 (China) Shanghai Shenhua
      - Kashima and Suwon lead the group with 9 points.

==== Ice hockey ====
- Stanley Cup playoffs: (Seeding in parentheses)
  - Eastern Conference Quarterfinals:
    - Game 4, (1) Boston Bruins 4, (8) Montreal Canadiens 1. **Bruins win series 4–0**.
      - The Bruins win their first playoff series in 10 years.
    - Game 4, (7) New York Rangers 2, (2) Washington Capitals 1. **Rangers lead series 3–1**.
  - Western Conference Quarterfinals:
    - Game 4, (5) Calgary Flames 6, (4) Chicago Blackhawks 4. **Series tied 2–2**.

==== Shooting ====
- ISSF World Cup in Beijing, China: (qualification scores in parentheses)
  - Men's 25 metre rapid fire pistol: (gold) Keith Sanderson (United States) 780.5 (584) (silver) Vijay Kumar (India) 780.4 (581) (bronze) Teruyoshi Akiyama (Japan) 777.5 (579)

=== April 21, 2009 (Tuesday) ===
==== Basketball ====
- NBA playoffs first round: (Seeding in parentheses)
  - Game 2, (1) Cleveland Cavaliers 94, (8) Detroit Pistons 82. **Cavaliers lead series 2–0**.
    - The Cavs survive a late scare from the Pistons, who cut their deficit to 7 points near the end after trailing by 29.
  - Game 2, (4) Portland Trail Blazers 107, (5) Houston Rockets 103. **Series tied 1–1**.
    - Brandon Roy scores 42 to give the Blazers their first playoff win since 2003.
  - Game 2, (1) Los Angeles Lakers 119, (8) Utah Jazz 109. **Lakers lead series 2–0**.
    - Lakers' coach Phil Jackson set an NBA record with his 195th playoff win.
- NBA awards:
  - Defensive Player of the Year: Dwight Howard, Orlando Magic.
    - Twenty-three-year-old Howard is the youngest ever player to win the award.

==== Football (soccer) ====
- Copa Libertadores group stage: (Teams in **bold** advance to the last 16 stage, teams in ~~strike~~ are eliminated)
  - Group 1:
    - Palmeiras (Brazil) 2–0 (Ecuador) LDU Quito
      - Defending champion LDU Quito will be eliminated if Sport Recife win or draw against Colo-Colo on Wednesday.
  - Group 3:
    - U. San Martín (Peru) 1–1 (Uruguay) **Nacional**
      - The draw secures Nacional a berth in the last 16 and eliminates Nacional of Paraguay.
- AFC Champions League group stage, matchday 4: (Teams in **bold** advance to the last 16 stage, teams in ~~strike~~ are eliminated)
  - Group B:
    - Al-Shabab (Saudi Arabia) 5–0 (United Arab Emirates) ~~Sharjah~~
    - Al-Gharafa (Qatar) 5–1 (Iran) Persepolis
      - Al-Shabab lead the group with 10 points, ahead of Persepolis with 7 and Al-Gharafa with 6.
  - Group D:
    - Sepahan (Iran) 0–1 (Uzbekistan) Bunyodkor
    - Al-Shabab Al-Arabi (United Arab Emirates) 1–4 (Saudi Arabia) Al-Ettifaq
      - Al-Ettifaq lead the group with 9 points, followed by Bunyodkur with 7.
  - Group F:
    - ~~Sriwijaya~~ (Indonesia) 0–3 (Japan) **Gamba Osaka**
      - Osaka win its fourth straight match and advance to the last 16.
    - Seoul (South Korea) 1–1 (China) Shandong Luneng
      - Shandong is in second place with 7 points, ahead of Seoul with 4.
  - Group H:
    - **Kawasaki Frontale** (Japan) 2–1 (Australia) Central Coast Mariners
    - Tianjin Teda (China) 0–0 (South Korea) Pohang Steelers
      - Kawasaki lead the group with 10 points, ahead of Pohang with 6.

==== Ice hockey ====
- Stanley Cup playoffs: (Seeding in parentheses)
  - Eastern Conference Quarterfinals:
    - Game 4, (6) Carolina Hurricanes 4, (3) New Jersey Devils 3. **Series tied 2–2**.
      - Jussi Jokinen scores the winning goal for the Hurricanes with 0.2 second left – the latest goal in playoff history – after the Devils rally from 3 goals down to level the score.
    - Game 4, (4) Pittsburgh Penguins 3, (5) Philadelphia Flyers 1. **Penguins lead series 3–1**.
  - Western Conference Quarterfinals:
    - Game 3, (1) San Jose Sharks 4, (8) Anaheim Ducks 3. **Ducks lead series 2–1**.
    - Game 3, (2) Detroit Red Wings 4, (7) Columbus Blue Jackets 1. **Red Wings lead series 3–0**.
    - Game 4, (3) Vancouver Canucks 3, (6) St. Louis Blues 2 (OT). **Canucks win series 4–0**.
      - Alex Burrows's goal with 19 seconds left in the first overtime period gives the Canucks their first four-game sweep in franchise history.

==== Shooting ====
- ISSF World Cup in Beijing, China: (qualification scores in parentheses)
  - Women's 50 metre rifle three positions: (gold) Lioubov Galkina (Russia) 679.9 (578) (silver) Xiong Meili (China) 675.8 (577) (bronze) Wan Xianggyan (China) 670.7 (568)
  - Women's 10 metre air pistol: (gold) Hu Jun (China) 490.5 (390) (silver) Heena Sidhu (India) 486.8 (385) (bronze) Lenka Marušková (Czech Republic) 485.9 (385)

=== April 20, 2009 (Monday) ===
==== Athletics ====
- 113th Boston Marathon:
  - Men: (1) Deriba Merga (Ethiopia) 2:08:42 (2) Daniel Rono (Kenya) 2:09:32 (3) Ryan Hall (United States) 2:09:40
  - Women: (1) Salina Kosgei (Kenya) 2:32:16 (2) Dire Tune (Ethiopia) 2:32:17 (3) Kara Goucher (United States) 2:32:25

==== Basketball ====
- NBA playoffs first round (seeding in parentheses):
  - Game 2, (2) Boston Celtics 118, (7) Chicago Bulls 115. **Series tied 1–1**.
    - Ray Allen scores 30 points, including the winning three-pointer with 2 seconds left, to send the series to Chicago level at 1 game apiece. Ben Gordon scores 42 in a losing effort.
  - Game 2, (3) San Antonio Spurs 105, (6) Dallas Mavericks 84. **Series tied 1–1**.
    - 38 points from Tony Parker help the Spurs level the series.
- NBA awards:
  - Coach of the Year: Mike Brown, Cleveland Cavaliers

==== Ice hockey ====
- Stanley Cup playoffs: (Seeding in parentheses)
  - Eastern Conference Quarterfinals:
    - Game 3, (1) Boston Bruins 4, (8) Montreal Canadiens 2. **Bruins lead series 3–0**.
    - Game 3, (2) Washington Capitals 4, (7) New York Rangers 0. **Rangers lead series 2–1**.
      - Rookie goalie Semyon Varlamov made his first career shutout and the Caps' first playoff shutout in six years.
  - Western Conference Quarterfinals:
    - Game 3, (5) Calgary Flames 4, (4) Chicago Blackhawks 2. **Blackhawks lead series 2–1**.

==== Shooting ====
- ISSF World Cup in Beijing, China: (qualification scores in parentheses)
  - Men's 50 metre rifle prone: (gold) Warren Potent (Australia) 701.5 (597) (silver) Josselin Henry (France) 698.8 (595) (bronze) Michael McPhail (United States) 698.7 (594)
  - Men's 10 metre air pistol: (gold) Shi Xinglong (China) 683.0 (582) (silver) Mai Jiajie (China) 682.8 (582) (bronze) Yury Dauhapolau (Belarus) 682.5 (583)

=== April 19, 2009 (Sunday) ===
==== Auto racing ====
- Formula One:
  - Chinese Grand Prix in Shanghai, China:
    - (1) Sebastian Vettel (Germany) (Red Bull–Renault) 1:57:43.485 (2) Mark Webber (Australia) (Red Bull-Renault) +10.970 (3) Jenson Button (United Kingdom) (Brawn–Mercedes) +44.975
      - Drivers standings (after 3 of 17 races): (1) Button 21 points (2) Rubens Barrichello (Brazil) (Brawn-Mercedes) 15 (3) Vettel & Timo Glock (Germany) (Toyota) 10
      - Constructors standings: (1) Brawn-Mercedes 36 points (2) Red Bull-Renault 19.5 (3) Toyota 18.5
- IndyCar Series:
  - Long Beach Grand Prix in Long Beach, California
    - (1) Dario Franchitti (United Kingdom) (2) Will Power (Australia) (3) Tony Kanaan (Brazil)
      - Standings: (1) Franchitti 84 (2) Power 69 (3) Ryan Briscoe (Australia) 67
- V8 Supercars:
  - Hamilton 400 in Hamilton, New Zealand
    - Round 4: (1) Jamie Whincup (Australia) (2) James Courtney (Australia) (3) Steven Johnson (Australia)
      - Standings (after 4 of 26 races): (1) Jamie Whincup (Australia) 600 (2) Lee Holdsworth (Australia) 498 (3) Will Davison (Australia) 483

==== Basketball ====
- NBA playoffs first round: (Seeding in parentheses, All times ET)
  - Game 1, (1) Los Angeles Lakers 113, (8) Utah Jazz 110. **Lakers lead series 1–0**.
    - Kobe Bryant leads the Lakers with 24 points as coach Phil Jackson improves his record in series opening games to 42–0.
  - Game 1, (6) Philadelphia 76ers 100, (3) Orlando Magic 98. **76ers lead series 1–0**.
    - The Sixers rally from 18-points down to win the game with Andre Iguodala's field goal 2 seconds from the end.
  - Game 1, (4) Atlanta Hawks 90, (5) Miami Heat 64. **Hawks lead series 1–0**.
  - Game 1, (2) Denver Nuggets 113, (7) New Orleans Hornets 84. **Nuggets lead series 1–0**.
- Israel women league:
  - Game 4 of best-of-5 final series:
    - Elitzur Ramla 53–61 Electra Ramat HaSharon. **Ramat HaSharon win the series 3–1 and its first championship in 6 years**.

==== Cricket ====
- ICC World Cup qualifier in South Africa:
  - Final:
    - In Centurion: Canada 185 (48 ov); Ireland 188/1 (42.3 ov). **Ireland win by 9 wickets**.
  - 3rd place playoff:
    - In Potchefstroom: Kenya 179 (43.1 ov); Netherlands 183/4 (32.1 ov). **Netherlands win by 6 wickets**.
  - 5th place playoff:
    - In Benoni: Afghanistan 295/8 (50 ov); Scotland 206 (40 ov). **Afghanistan win by 89 runs**.
  - 7th place playoff:
    - In Krugersdorp: Namibia 267/9 (50 ov); United Arab Emirates 269/6 (41.3 ov). **United Arab Emirates win by 4 wickets**.

==== Cycling ====
- UCI ProTour:
  - Amstel Gold Race:
    - (1) Serguei Ivanov (Russia) (Katusha) (2) Karsten Kroon (Netherlands) (Saxo Bank) (3) Robert Gesink (Netherlands) (Rabobank)

==== Football (soccer) ====
- CAF Champions League second round, first leg:
  - ASEC Mimosas (Ivory Coast) 1–0 (Zimbabwe) Monomotapa United
  - Heartland (Nigeria) 2–1 (Cameroon) Cotonsport
- FA Cup semi-finals at Wembley Stadium:
  - Manchester United 0–0 (AET) Everton. Everton wins 4–2 on penalties.
    - Everton spoils Manchester United's quest for a quintuple of titles, and will meet Chelsea in the final on May 30.
- Rio de Janeiro Championships:
  - Taça Rio Final at Maracanã Stadium:
    - Botafogo 0–1 Flamengo
- Netherlands League:
  - AZ secure the league title for the second time in its history, with 3 matches remaining, and become the first champion outside the "big three" (Ajax, Feyenoord and PSV) in 28 years.

==== Golf ====
- PGA Tour:
  - Verizon Heritage in Hilton Head Island, South Carolina
    - Winner: Brian Gay (United States) 264 (−20)
      - Gay breaks the tournament record by one stroke and wins by a margin of 10 strokes, also a record.
- European Tour:
  - Volvo China Open in Beijing, China:
    - Winner: Scott Strange (Australia) 280 (−8)
      - Strange wins by one stroke over Gonzalo Fernández-Castaño.

==== Ice hockey ====
- Stanley Cup playoffs: (Seeding in parentheses, All times ET)
  - Eastern Conference Quarterfinals:
    - Game 3, (3) New Jersey Devils 3, (6) Carolina Hurricanes 2 (OT). **Devils lead series 2–1**.
    - Game 3, (5) Philadelphia Flyers 6, (4) Pittsburgh Penguins 3. **Penguins lead series 2–1**.
  - Western Conference Quarterfinals:
    - Game 2, (8) Anaheim Ducks 3, (1) San Jose Sharks 2. **Ducks lead series 2–0**.
    - Game 3, (3) Vancouver Canucks 3, (6) St. Louis Blues 2. **Canucks lead series 3–0**.
- World U18 Championships in Fargo, North Dakota & Moorhead, Minnesota, United States:
  - Final:
    - (gold) United States 5–0 (silver) Russia
  - 3rd place playoff:
    - Canada 4–5 (SO) (bronze) Finland

==== Shooting ====
- ISSF World Cup in Beijing, China: (qualification scores in parentheses)
  - Men's 50 metre pistol: (gold) Rashid Yunusmetov (Kazakhstan) 660.5 (568) (silver) Pavol Kopp (Slovakia) 657.1 (561) (bronze) Vladimir Isakov (Russia) 654.5 (557)
  - Women's 10 metre air rifle: (gold) Yin Wen (China) 503.4 (399) (silver) Yi Siling (China) 501.5 (399) (bronze) Snježana Pejčić (Croatia) 500.7 (399)
  - Women's 25 metre pistol: (gold) Zhao Xu (China) 787.6 (580) (silver) Lalita Yauhleuskaya (Australia) 786.1 (585) (bronze) Viktoria Chaika (Belarus) 785.7 (585)

==== Tennis ====
- ATP Tour:
  - Monte Carlo Masters in Roquebrune-Cap-Martin, France:
    - Final: (Spain) **Rafael Nadal** def. (Serbia) Novak Djokovic, 6–3, 2–6, 6–1.
      - Nadal wins his fifth successive title at Monte Carlo.
- WTA Tour:
  - Family Circle Cup in Charleston, South Carolina, United States:
    - Final: (Germany) **Sabine Lisicki** def. (Denmark) Caroline Wozniacki, 6–2, 6–4
      - Lisicki wins her first WTA Tour title.
  - Barcelona Ladies Open in Barcelona, Spain:
    - Final: (Italy) **Roberta Vinci** def. (Russia) Maria Kirilenko, 6–0, 6–4.

=== April 18, 2009 (Saturday) ===
==== Auto racing ====
- Sprint Cup Series:
  - Subway Fresh Fit 500 in Avondale, Arizona
    - (1) Mark Martin (Arkansas) (Hendrick Motorsports) (2) Tony Stewart (Indiana) (Stewart Haas Racing) (3) Kurt Busch (Nevada) (Penske Championship Racing)
    - Martin wins a Cup race for the first time since 2005.
      - Drivers' standings after 8 races: (1) Jeff Gordon (California) 1242 points (2) Jimmie Johnson (California) −85 (3) Kurt Busch −98
- V8 Supercars:
  - Hamilton 400 in Hamilton, New Zealand
    - Round 3: (1) Jamie Whincup (Australia) (2) Mark Winterbottom (Australia) (3) Lee Holdsworth (Australia)
    - Standings (after 3 of 26 races): (1) Whincup 450 (2) Will Davison (Australia) 387 (3) Holdsworth 378

==== Basketball ====
- NBA playoffs first round: (Seedings in parentheses)
  - Eastern Conference:
    - Game 1, (7) Chicago Bulls 105, (2) Boston Celtics 103 (OT). **Bulls lead series 1–0**.
      - The Bulls win their first ever playoff game against the Celtics, and Derrick Rose scores 36 points to tie Kareem Abdul-Jabbar's record for a rookie in his playoff debut.
    - Game 1, (1) Cleveland Cavaliers 102, (8) Detroit Pistons 84. **Cavaliers lead series 1–0**.
      - LeBron James scores 38 points for the Cavaliers, including a 41-foot basket at the halftime buzzer.
  - Western Conference:
    - Game 1, (6) Dallas Mavericks 105, (3) San Antonio Spurs 97. **Mavericks lead series 1–0**.
      - The Mavericks get their first road win in the playoffs after nine consecutive losses.
    - Game 1, (5) Houston Rockets 108, (4) Portland Trail Blazers 81. **Rockets lead series 1–0**.
      - Yao Ming scores 9-from-9 field goals, the first player since 1986 and the sixth in playoff history to get a perfect record from at least 9 FG attempts.
- Adriatic League Final:
  - Cibona Zagreb 49–63 Partizan Belgrade
    - Partizan win the trophy for the third straight season.

==== Football (soccer) ====
- CAF Champions League second round, first leg:
  - Al Ahli Tripoli (Libya) 0–0 (Tunisia) Étoile Sportive du Sahel
  - Kano Pillars (Nigeria) 1–1 (Egypt) Al Ahly
  - Primeiro de Agosto (Angola) 3–1 (Sudan) Al-Hilal
  - Djoliba (Mali) 0–0 (Zambia) ZESCO United
  - TP Mazembe (Democratic Republic of the Congo) 1–0 (Morocco) Ittihad Khemisset

==== Ice hockey ====
- Stanley Cup playoffs: (Seeding in parentheses)
  - Eastern Conference Quarterfinals:
    - Game 2, (1) Boston Bruins 5, (8) Montreal Canadiens 1. **Bruins lead series 2–0**.
    - Game 2, (7) New York Rangers 1, (2) Washington Capitals 0. **Rangers lead series 2–0**.
  - Western Conference Quarterfinals:
    - Game 2, (2) Detroit Red Wings 4, (7) Columbus Blue Jackets 0. **Red Wings lead series 2–0**.
      - Chris Osgood makes his 14th career playoff shutout for the Red Wings, who attempt to be the first defending champion to reach the second round in seven years.
    - Game 2, (4) Chicago Blackhawks 3, (5) Calgary Flames 2. **Blackhawks lead series 2–0**.
      - The 'Hawks rally from 2 goals down to win two playoff games for the first time in 11 years.
- World U18 Championships in Fargo, North Dakota & Moorhead, Minnesota, United States:
  - 5th place playoff:
    - Sweden 4–2 Czech Republic
  - Relegation round: (Teams in **bold** stay in top division, teams in ~~strike~~ are relegated to Division I)
    - **Switzerland** 2–4 **Slovakia**
    - ~~Germany~~ 2–5 ~~Norway~~

==== Rugby union ====
- EDF Energy Cup Final in London:
  - Gloucester (England) 12–50 (Wales) **Cardiff Blues**

==== Shooting ====
- ISSF World Cup in Beijing, China: (qualification scores in parentheses)
  - Men's 10 metre air rifle: (gold) Péter Sidi (Hungary) 699.5 (598) (silver) Zhu Qinan (China) 699.3+10.7 (597) (bronze) Václav Haman (Czech Republic) 699.3+10.4 (595)

==== Winter sports ====
===== Figure skating =====
- ISU World Team Trophy in Tokyo, Japan:
  - Pairs standings after Free Skating: (gold) Zhang Dan/Zhang Hao (China) 193.82 (silver) Yuko Kavaguti/Alexander Smirnov (Russia) 185.15 (bronze) Jessica Dubé/Bryce Davison (Canada) 164.12
  - Ladies standings after Free Skating: (gold) Mao Asada (Japan) 201.87 (silver) Joannie Rochette (Canada) 182.16 (bronze) Caroline Zhang (United States) 175.68
  - Final team standings: (1) United States 60 points, (2) Canada 54, (3) Japan 50, 4. France 37, 5. Russia 35, 6. China 34

=== April 17, 2009 (Friday) ===
==== Auto racing ====
- Nationwide Series:
  - Bashas' Supermarkets 200 in Avondale, Arizona
    - (1) Greg Biffle (Washington (state)) (Roush Fenway Racing) (2) Jason Leffler (California) (Braun Racing) (3) Brad Keselowski (Michigan) (JR Motorsports)
- IndyCar Series news:
  - Two-time Indianapolis 500 champion Hélio Castroneves is acquitted in federal court in Miami on six counts of tax evasion. (AP/ESPN)

==== Baseball ====
- Major League Baseball news:
  - Gary Sheffield of the New York Mets becomes the 25th player in MLB history to hit his 500th home run, hitting a solo shot off the Milwaukee Brewers' Mitch Stetter in the seventh inning of the Mets' 5–4 home win.

==== Cricket ====
- Australia in South Africa:
  - 5th ODI in Johannesburg:
    - Australia 303/7 (50 ov); South Africa 256 (45.5 ov). **Australia win by 47 runs. South Africa win the 5-match series 3–2**.
- ICC World Cup qualifier in South Africa:
  - Super Eights: (Teams in **bold** qualify for the 2011 World Cup, teams in italics gain ODI status, teams in ~~strike~~ are eliminated from ODI status)
    - In Benoni: Scotland 299/7 (50 ov); ~~United Arab Emirates~~ 177 (39.4 ov). **Scotland win by 122 runs**.
      - Scotland's win gives them ODI status, while UAE finish 7th and fails to gain ODI status by inferior NRR.
    - In Pretoria: **Ireland** 208/9 (50 ov); **Kenya** 209/4 (48 ov). **Kenya win by 6 wickets**.
      - Both teams qualify for the World Cup and retain their ODI status. Ireland finish in first place despite their loss, Kenya in third.
    - In Krugersdorp: Afghanistan 243/7 (50 ov); ~~Namibia~~ 222 (48.3 ov). **Afghanistan win by 21 runs**.
      - Afghanistan, who played in World Cricket League Division Five a year ago, gets ODI status with their win over Namibia, that finish bottom of the group.
    - In Johannesburg: **Canada** 205/8 (50 ov); **Netherlands** 206/4 (47.1 ov). **Netherlands win by 6 wickets**.
      - Both teams qualify for the World Cup and retain ODI status. Canada finish second by better NRR and will meet Ireland in the final, Netherlands will play against Kenya in 3rd place playoff.
    - Final standings: **Ireland** 10 points, **Canada**, **Kenya**, **Netherlands** 8, Scotland, Afghanistan, ~~UAE~~ 6, ~~Namibia~~ 4.
- The ICC announces that Pakistan will not host the 2011 World Cup, citing an "uncertain security situation". The tournament will still be held in India, Sri Lanka, and Bangladesh.

==== Football (soccer) ====
- CAF Champions League Second round, first leg:
  - Kampala City Council (Uganda) 0–1 (Sudan) Al-Merreikh

==== Ice hockey ====
- Stanley Cup playoffs: (Seeding in parentheses)
  - Eastern Conference Quarterfinals:
    - Game 2, (6) Carolina Hurricanes 2, (3) New Jersey Devils 1 (OT). **Series tied 1–1**.
    - Game 2, (4) Pittsburgh Penguins 3, (5) Philadelphia Flyers 2 (OT). **Penguins lead series 2–0**.
  - Western Conference Quarterfinals:
    - Game 2, (3) Vancouver Canucks 3, (6) St. Louis Blues 0. **Canucks lead series 2–0**.
- World U18 Championships in Fargo, North Dakota & Moorhead, Minnesota, United States:
  - Semifinals:
    - Canada 1–2 **United States**
    - Finland 0–4 **Russia**
  - Relegation round:
    - Slovakia 4–5 (SO) Germany
      - Germany's win in shootout means Switzerland stay in the top division and Norway is relegated.
- World Championship Division I:
  - Group A in Vilnius, Lithuania:
    - Croatia 5–1 Australia
      - Australia is relegated to Division II.
    - Slovenia 1–2 Kazakhstan
      - Kazakhstan advance to the top division.
  - Group B in Toruń, Poland:
    - Netherlands 5–1 Romania
      - Romania is relegated to Division II.
    - Italy 2–0 Ukraine
      - Italy advance to the top division.

==== Winter sports ====
===== Figure skating =====
- ISU World Team Trophy in Tokyo, Japan:
  - Pairs Short Program: (1) Zhang Dan/Zhang Hao (China) 70.42 (2) Yuko Kavaguti/Alexander Smirnov (Russia) 65.08 (3) Caydee Denney/Jeremy Barrett (United States) 56.58
  - Ice dance standings after Free Dance: (gold) Tanith Belbin/Benjamin Agosto (United States) 162.98 (silver) Tessa Virtue/Scott Moir (Canada) 156.71 (bronze) Nathalie Péchalat/Fabian Bourzat (France) 150.63
  - Men's standings after Free Skating: (gold) Evan Lysacek (United States) 238.56 (silver) Brian Joubert (France) 237.09 (bronze) Nobunari Oda (Japan) 229.25
  - Team standings after day 2: (1) United States 59 points, (2) Canada 53, (3) Japan 52, 4. France 37, 5. Russia 36, 6. China 33

=== April 16, 2009 (Thursday) ===
==== Baseball ====
- Major League Baseball season home opener:
  - Cleveland Indians 10, New York Yankees 2
    - The Yankees open the new Yankee Stadium with a blowout loss to the Indians, who score 9 runs in the 7th inning including a grand slam by Grady Sizemore. Earlier, the Yankees' Jorge Posada hit the first home run in the ballpark's history.

==== Basketball ====
- Israel women league:
  - Game 3 of best-of-5 final series:
    - Electra Ramat HaSharon 96–66 Elitzur Ramla. **Ramat HaSharon lead the series 2–1**.

==== Football (soccer) ====
- UEFA Cup quarterfinals, second leg: (First leg results in parentheses)
  - **Dynamo Kyiv** (Ukraine) 3–0 (0–0) (France) Paris Saint-Germain
    - Dynamo Kyiv win 3–0 on aggregate.
  - Marseille (France) 1–2 (0–2) (Ukraine) **Shakhtar Donetsk**
    - Shakhtar Donetsk win 4–1 on aggregate.
    - Donetsk and Kyiv will meet in an all-Ukrainian semifinal, which guarantees a Ukrainian team in a European final for the first time since the country split from USSR. Until this season, no Ukrainian team advanced beyond the last-16 stage.
  - Manchester City (England) 2–1 (1–3) (Germany) **Hamburg**
    - Hamburg win 4–3 on aggregate.
  - Udinese (Italy) 3–3 (1–3) **Werder Bremen**
    - Werder Bremen come back from 2-goals down to level the score and win 6–4 on aggregate.
    - Hamburg will meet North Germany rival Bremen in the semifinals.
- Copa Libertadores group stage: (Teams in **bold** advance to the last 16 stage, teams in ~~strike~~ are eliminated)
  - Group 2:
    - Deportivo Táchira (Venezuela) 2–1 (Paraguay) ~~Guaraní~~
      - Boca Juniors lead the group with 12 points from 4 games, ahead of Deportivo Táchira with 9 from 5 and Deportivo Cuenca with 6 from 4. Boca Juniors will advance to the last 16 stage with a win or draw against Cuenca on April 23.
  - Group 4:
    - ~~América de Cali~~ (Colombia) 0–0 (Uruguay) Defensor Sporting
      - **São Paulo** lead the group with 10 points from 5 games, followed by Independiente Medellín with 7 and Defensor Sporting with 5.
  - Group 7:
    - Boyacá Chicó (Colombia) 2–1 (Bolivia) ~~Aurora~~
      - **Grêmio** lead the group with 13 points from 5 games, ahead of Boyacá Chicó with 9 and Universidad de Chile with 7.

==== Ice hockey ====
- Stanley Cup playoffs: (Seeding in parentheses)
  - Eastern Conference Quarterfinals:
    - Game 1, (1) Boston Bruins 4, (8) Montreal Canadiens 2. **Bruins lead series 1–0**.
  - Western Conference Quarterfinals:
    - Game 1, (8) Anaheim Ducks 2, (1) San Jose Sharks 0. **Ducks lead series 1–0**.
    - Game 1, (2) Detroit Red Wings 4, (7) Columbus Blue Jackets 1. **Red Wings lead series 1–0**.
      - Red Wings' defenseman Chris Chelios set an NHL record with his 261st playoff game.
    - Game 1, (4) Chicago Blackhawks 3, (5) Calgary Flames 2 (OT). **Blackhawks lead series 1–0**.
      - Martin Havlát scores 12 seconds into overtime, the third fastest overtime goal in playoff history, to give the Blackhawks their first playoff win in seven years.
- World U18 Championships in Fargo, North Dakota & Moorhead, Minnesota, United States:
  - Quarterfinals:
    - Sweden 1–4 Russia
      - Russia will play against Finland in the semifinals.
    - United States 6–2 Czech Republic
      - USA will play against Canada in the semifinals.
  - Relegation round:
    - Switzerland 7–3 Norway

==== Winter sports ====
===== Figure skating =====
- ISU World Team Trophy in Tokyo, Japan:
  - Original Dance: (1) Tanith Belbin/Benjamin Agosto (United States) 64.27 (2) Tessa Virtue/Scott Moir (Canada) 60.98 (3) Jana Khokhlova/Sergei Novitski (Russia) 58.58
  - Men's Short Program: (1) Brian Joubert (France) 85.39 (2) Evan Lysacek (United States) 83.70 (3) Nobunari Oda (Japan) 79.35
  - Ladies Short Program: (1) Mao Asada (Japan) 75.84 (2) Joannie Rochette (Canada) 62.08 (3) Miki Ando (Japan) 62.08
  - Team standings after day 1: (1) United States 48 points, (2) Japan 43, (3) Canada 39, 4. France 32, 5. Russia 29, 6. China 22

=== April 15, 2009 (Wednesday) ===
==== Basketball ====
- NBA: End of the regular season:
  - Eastern Conference:
    - The Philadelphia 76ers clinch sixth place with a 111–110 overtime win over the Cleveland Cavaliers, combined with the Chicago Bulls' 109–98 loss to the Toronto Raptors. The Sixers will play in the first round of the playoffs against the #3 seed Orlando Magic. The Bulls end in seventh place and will meet the #2 Boston Celtics.
    - The Cavaliers' loss prevents them from equalling the NBA record of 40 home wins in a season set by the 1985–86 Celtics.
  - Western Conference:
    - The San Antonio Spurs clinch the Southwest Division title and third place in the Conference with a 105–98 overtime win over the New Orleans Hornets, coupled with the Houston Rockets' 95–84 loss to the Dallas Mavericks.
    - The Mavericks clinch sixth place with their win over Houston and the Hornets' loss to San Antonio, and will meet the Spurs in the playoffs. New Orleans end in seventh place, and will play against the Denver Nuggets, who secure second place as a result of the Rockets' loss.
    - The Portland Trail Blazers clinch fourth place and home advantage in a playoff series against the Rockets with a 104–76 win over the Nuggets.

==== Cricket ====
- ICC World Cup qualifier in South Africa:
  - Super Eights (teams in **bold** qualify for the 2011 World Cup; teams in italics gain/retain ODI status):
    - In Benoni: Afghanistan 279 (50 overs); Scotland 237/9 (47.1 overs). **Afghanistan win by 42 runs.**
    - In Pretoria: Netherlands 222 (50 overs); **Ireland** 226/4 (44.3 overs). **Ireland win by 6 wickets.**
      - Ireland advance to the final, and secure a berth in the World Cup.
    - In Krugersdorp: Canada 194 (49.5 overs); United Arab Emirates 200/5 (31.2 overs). **United Arab Emirates win by 5 wickets.**
    - In Johannesburg: Namibia 305 (49.5 overs); Kenya 104 (30 overs). **Namibia win by 201 runs.**
      - Standings after 6 of 7 rounds: **Ireland** 10 points; Canada 8; Kenya, Netherlands, UAE 6; Namibia, Afghanistan, Scotland 4.

==== Football (soccer) ====
- UEFA Champions League Quarterfinals, second leg: (First leg result in parentheses)
  - **Arsenal** (England) 3–0 (1–1) (Spain) Villarreal
    - Arsenal win 4–1 on aggregate, with goals by Theo Walcott, Emmanuel Adebayor and Robin van Persie.
  - Porto (Portugal) 0–1 (2–2) **Manchester United**
    - Cristiano Ronaldo's goal from 35 metres in the 6th minute gives Manchester United 3–2 win on aggregate, and an all-England match with Arsenal in the semifinals.
- Copa Libertadores group stage: (Teams in **bold** advance to the last 16 stage; teams in ~~strike~~ are eliminated)
  - Group 1:
    - Palmeiras (Brazil) 1–1 (Brazil) Sport Recife
      - Sport Recife and Colo-Colo lead the group with 7 points from 4 games.
  - Group 4:
    - Independiente Medellín (Colombia) 2–1 (Brazil) **São Paulo**
  - Group 7:
    - Universidad de Chile 0–2 (Brazil) **Grêmio**
      - Gremio clinch a berth in the last 16.
- Finnish League Cup final in Vantaa:
  - Tampere United 2–0 HJK Helsinki

==== Ice hockey ====
- Stanley Cup playoffs: (Seeding in parentheses)
  - Eastern Conference Quarterfinals:
    - Game 1, (7) New York Rangers 4, (2) Washington Capitals 3. **Rangers lead series 1–0**.
    - Game 1, (3) New Jersey Devils 4, (6) Carolina Hurricanes 1. **Devils lead series 1–0**.
    - Game 1, (4) Pittsburgh Penguins 4, (5) Philadelphia Flyers 1. **Penguins lead series 1–0**.
  - Western Conference Quarterfinals:
    - Game 1, (3) Vancouver Canucks 2, (6) St. Louis Blues 1. **Canucks lead series 1–0**.

==== Shooting ====
- ISSF World Cup in Changwon, South Korea: (qualification scores in parentheses)
  - Men's 50 metre rifle three positions: (gold) Gagan Narang (India) 1264.0 (1166) (silver) Han Jin-seop (South Korea) 1261.9 (1165) (bronze) Aleksey Kamensky (Russia) 1261.7 (1167)

==== Water polo ====
- World League:
  - Preliminary round, Europe group B, matchday 4 of 6:
    - Romania 12–10 Italy

=== April 14, 2009 (Tuesday) ===
==== Basketball ====
- NBA:
  - The Philadelphia 76ers' 100–98 loss to the Boston Celtics puts them one game behind the Chicago Bulls in the race for sixth place in the Eastern Conference. Unless the Sixers beat the Cleveland Cavaliers on Wednesday and the Bulls lose to the Toronto Raptors, Philadelphia will meet the Celtics again in the playoffs this weekend, and Chicago will play against the Orlando Magic.
  - The Utah Jazz are confirmed in 8th place in the Western Conference after a 125–112 loss to the Los Angeles Lakers, and will meet the Lakers again in the first round.

==== Boxing ====
- Oscar De La Hoya, a 10-time world champion in six different weight classes, announces his retirement. (AP/ESPN)

==== Football (soccer) ====
- UEFA Champions League Quarterfinals, second leg: (First leg result in parentheses)
  - **Chelsea** (England) 4–4 (3–1) (England) Liverpool
    - Liverpool leads 2–0 and 4–3 and gets within one goal of advancing, but in the end Chelsea wins 7–5 on aggregate.
  - Bayern Munich (Germany) 1–1 (0–4) (Spain) **Barcelona**
    - Barcelona wins 5–1 on aggregate and will play against Chelsea in the semifinals.
- Copa Libertadores group stage: (Teams in **bold** advance to the last 16 stage, teams in ~~strike~~ are eliminated)
  - Group 5:
    - Deportivo Quito (Ecuador) 3–1 (Bolivia) ~~Universitario de Sucre~~
      - Deportivo's win keeps them in contention for a last 16 berth with 8 points from 5 games, behind Cruzeiro with 10 pts and Estudiantes with 9.
  - Group 6:
    - **Caracas** (Venezuela) 1–0 (Chile) Everton
    - Guadalajara (Mexico) 0–0 (Argentina) ~~Lanús~~
      - Caracas lead the group with 9 points from 5 games, followed by Guagalajara with 8 pts and Everton with 7.

==== Ice hockey ====
- World U18 Championships in Fargo, North Dakota & Moorhead, Minnesota, United States: (Teams in **bold** clinch a semifinal berth, teams in italics clinch (at least) a quarterfinal berth, teams in ~~strike~~ go to Relegation round)
  - Group A:
    - ~~Switzerland~~ 8–3 ~~Germany~~
      - Germany's regulation loss sends them to the relegation round. The Czech Republic receives a quarterfinal berth.
    - **Canada** 4–2 Sweden
      - Canada advances to the semifinals, while Sweden advances to the quarterfinals.
  - Group B:
    - ~~Slovakia~~ 0–7 **Finland**
      - Finland advance to the semifinals, with a regulation win, and a regulation one-goal loss for USA against Russia, while Slovakia is sent to the relegation round.
    - Russia 6–5 United States
      - Russia's one-goal regulation win combined with Finland's win over Slovakia send both teams to the quarterfinals.

==== Shooting ====
- ISSF World Cup in Changwon, South Korea: (qualification scores in parentheses)
  - Men's 25 metre rapid fire pistol: (gold) Aleksey Klimov (Russia) 790.2 (590) (silver) Keith Sanderson (United States) 787.3 (589) (bronze) Zhang Jian (China) 785.7 (588)

==== Water polo ====
- World League:
  - Preliminary round, Europe group C, matchday 4 of 6:
    - ~~Russia~~ 12–15 Croatia (19:30)
      - The win by Croatia eliminates Russia and Germany from qualifying. Croatia leads Spain by 4 points.

=== April 13, 2009 (Monday) ===
==== Baseball ====
- Major League Baseball season home opener:
  - San Diego Padres 6, New York Mets 5
    - Citi Field, the Mets' new stadium, opens with a home run by the Padres' first batter Jody Gerut.

==== Basketball ====
- NBA:
  - The Cleveland Cavaliers secure the best record in the League and home advantage throughout the playoffs with a 117–109 win over the Indiana Pacers.
  - The Detroit Pistons are confirmed as #8 seed and the Cavaliers' first round opponents after losing 91–88 to the Chicago Bulls.
  - The Denver Nuggets clinch the Northwest Division title and secure at least third place in the Western Conference with a 118–98 win over the Sacramento Kings. The Nuggets also tie their franchise record of 54 wins and will have home advantage in a playoff series for the first time in 21 years.
  - The Houston Rockets, Portland Trail Blazers and San Antonio Spurs are tied in third place, one game behind the Nuggets, with one game remaining. The Rockets have the tie-break edge over the Spurs for the Southwest Division title, and also hold the advantage over the Nuggets and the Trail Blazers.

==== Cricket ====
- Australia in South Africa:
  - 4th ODI in Port Elizabeth:
    - South Africa 317/6 (50 ov, Herschelle Gibbs 110); Australia 256 (45.5 ov). **South Africa win by 61 runs and take unassailable 3–1 lead in 5-match series**.
- ICC World Cup qualifier in South Africa:
  - Super Eights: (Teams in italics gain ODI status)
    - In Benoni: Namibia 258/8 (50.0 ov); Netherlands 262/8 (47.1 ov). **Netherlands win by 2 wickets**.
    - In Pretoria: Afghanistan 265/8 (50.0 ov); Canada 268/4 (48.3 ov). **Canada win by 6 wickets**.
    - In Krugersdorp: Kenya 178 (49.4 ov); Scotland 154 (47.2 ov). **Kenya win by 24 runs**.
    - In Johannesburg: United Arab Emirates 133 (39.5 ov); Ireland 134/2 (27.4 ov). **Ireland win by 8 wickets**.
      - Standings after 5 of 7 rounds: Canada, Ireland 8 points, Kenya, Netherlands 6, Scotland, UAE 4, Afghanistan, Namibia 2.
  - 9th place Playoff:
    - In Potchefstroom: Uganda 352/7 (50 ov); Bermuda 356/2 (48.3 ov). **Bermuda win by 8 wickets**.
  - 11th Place Playoff:
    - In Potchefstroom: Denmark 220 (48.2 ov); Oman 222/5 (41.4 ov). **Oman win by 5 wickets**.

==== Ice hockey ====
- World U18 Championships in Fargo, North Dakota & Moorhead, Minnesota, United States: (Teams in **bold** secure a semifinal berth, teams in italics secure (at least) a quarterfinal berth, teams in ~~strike~~ go to Relegation round)
  - Group A:
    - Sweden 11–0 ~~Switzerland~~
    - Czech Republic 3–4 (OT) Canada
      - Canada come back from 0–3 down and score the winning goal by Brett Connolly after 1:23 minute in overtime.
      - Standings: Sweden 9 pts (3 games), Canada 8 (3), Czech Rep. 4 (4), Germany 3 (3), ~~Switzerland~~ 0 (3)
  - Group B:
    - Finland 10–1 ~~Norway~~
    - United States 12–0 Slovakia
      - Standings: USA 9 pts (3 games), Finland, Russia 6 (3), Slovakia 3 (3), ~~Norway~~ 0 (4)

==== Motorcycle racing ====
- Moto GP:
  - Qatar motorcycle Grand Prix in Doha, Qatar:
    - MotoGP: (1) Casey Stoner (Australia) (Ducati) 42:53.984 (2) Valentino Rossi (Italy) (Yamaha) + 7.771 (3) Jorge Lorenzo (Spain) (Yamaha) + 16.244

==== Shooting ====
- ISSF World Cup in Changwon, South Korea: (qualification score in parentheses)
  - Women's 50 metre rifle three positions: (gold) Yin Wen (China) 685.2 (587) (silver) Wan Xiangyan (China) 676.8 (580) (bronze) Wang Chengyi (China) 676.6 (582)
  - Women's 10 metre air pistol: (gold) Tong Xin (China) 489.4 (388) (silver) Lee Ho-lim (South Korea) 488.3 (387) (bronze) Lalita Yauhleuskaya (Australia) 487.8 (386)

=== April 12, 2009 (Sunday) ===
==== Auto racing ====
- A1 Grand Prix:
  - Grand Prix of Nations, Portugal in Portimão, Portugal
    - Sprint race: (1) Netherlands (Robert Doornbos) 19:33.501 (2) (Republic of Ireland) Ireland (Adam Carroll) + 3.635 (3) Portugal (Filipe Albuquerque) + 5.728
    - Feature race: (1) Switzerland (Neel Jani) 1:10:45.011 (2) Portugal + 6.786 (3) Malaysia (Fairuz Fauzy) + 9.705
    - Standings after 6 of 8 rounds (with dropped scores): (1) Ireland 86 points (2) Switzerland 84 (3) Portugal 82

==== Badminton ====
- Asia Championships in Suwon, South Korea: (seeding in parentheses)
  - Men's singles: Bao Chunlai (China) (4) bt Chen Long (China) 16–21, 21–10, 21–16
  - Women's singles: Zhu Lin (China) (6) bt Xie Xingfang (China) (5) 21–11, 21–10
  - Men's doubles: Markis Kido/Hendra Setiawan (Indonesia) (1) bt Ko Sung-Hyun/Yoo Yeon-Seong (South Korea) (8) 21–18, 26–24
  - Women's doubles: Ma Jin/Wang Xiaoli (China) bt Lee Hyo-jung/Lee Kyung-Won (South Korea) (3) 21–11, 21–18
  - Mixed doubles: Lee Yong-Dae/Lee Hyo-jung (South Korea) (1) bt Yoo Yeon-Seong/Kim Min-Jung (South Korea) 21–12, 21–15

==== Basketball ====
- NBA:
  - The Cleveland Cavaliers win 107–76 over the Boston Celtics, and need one more win in their two remaining games, or a Los Angeles Lakers loss in their only remaining game, to clinch the best record in the NBA and home court advantage throughout the playoffs. The Lakers keep their chances alive with a 92–75 win over the Memphis Grizzlies.
  - The San Antonio Spurs' 95–92 win over the Sacramento Kings puts them in a three-way-tie for third place in the Western Conference with the Houston Rockets and Portland Trail Blazers, and one game behind the Denver Nuggets in second place. All four teams have 2 games remaining.
  - The Miami Heat clinch fifth place in the Eastern Conference with a 122–105 win over the New York Knicks, and will play the Atlanta Hawks in the first round of the playoffs.

==== Cycling ====
- Monument Classics:
  - Paris–Roubaix:
    - (1) Tom Boonen (Belgium) (Quick-Step) 6h 15'54" (2) Filippo Pozzato (Italy) (Team Katusha) + 47" (3) Thor Hushovd (Norway) (Cervélo TestTeam) + 1'17"
      - Boonen wins the "Hell of the North" for the third time, the sixth rider in the race history to do so.

==== Golf ====
- Men's majors:
  - The Masters in Augusta, Georgia, fourth round:
    - Winner: Ángel Cabrera (Argentina) , on the second playoff hole.
    - Final standings: (1) Kenny Perry (United States) , Ángel Cabrera (Argentina) & Chad Campbell (United States) 276 (−12)
    - Playoff:
      - First hole: (1) Cabrera & Perry 4 (E) (3) Campbell 5 (+1)
      - Second hole: (1) Cabrera 4 (E) (2) Perry 5 (+1)
    - Perry led by 2 strokes with 2 holes left to play, but bogeys in the last 2 holes make a 3-way playoff. Another bogey for Perry in the second extra hole give the title to Cabrera, who become the first Masters winner from South America.

==== Ice hockey ====
- Kontinental Hockey League:
  - Gagarin Cup final best-of-7 series:
    - Game 7: Ak Bars Kazan 1–0 Lokomotiv Yaroslavl. **Kazan win series 4–3**.
- Women's World Championships in Hameenlinna, Finland:
  - Gold medal game: (gold) United States 4–1 (silver) Canada
  - Bronze medal game: (bronze) Finland 4–1 Sweden
- World U18 Championships in Fargo, North Dakota & Moorhead, Minnesota, United States:
  - Group A:
    - Germany 4–3 Czech Republic
  - Group B:
    - Norway 1–8 Russia
- NHL:
  - The Pittsburgh Penguins clinch fourth place in the Eastern Conference and home advantage in the first round of the playoff, as a result of the Philadelphia Flyers' 4–3 loss to the New York Rangers.

==== Motorcycle racing ====
- Moto GP:
  - Qatar motorcycle Grand Prix in Doha, Qatar:
    - MotoGP: Postponed to April 13 due to rain
    - 250 cc: (1) Héctor Barberá (Spain) (2) Jules Cluzel (France) (3) Mike Di Meglio (France)
    - 125 cc: (1) Andrea Iannone (Italy) (2) Julián Simón (Spain) (3) Sandro Cortese (Germany)

==== Rugby union ====
- Heineken Cup quarter-finals:
  - **Munster** 43–9 (Wales) Ospreys in Limerick
  - Harlequins (England) 5–6 **Leinster** in London

==== Shooting ====
- ISSF World Cup in Changwon, South Korea: (score in qualifying in parentheses)
  - Men's 50 metre rifle prone: (gold) Warren Potent (Australia) 700.0 (596) (silver) Josselin Henry (France) 699.4 (596) (bronze) Ole Magnus Bakken (Norway) 699.3 (597)
  - Men's 10 metre air pistol: (gold) Leonid Yekimov (Russia) 691.0 (587) (silver) Jin Jong-oh (South Korea) 689.7 (594 WR) (bronze) Shi Xinglong (China) 685.9 (584)
    - In the qualification round, Jin set a world record with a score of 594, one point better than Sergei Pyzhianov's twenty-year-old mark.

==== Tennis ====
- ATP Tour:
  - Grand Prix Hassan II in Casablanca, Morocco:
    - Final: **(Spain) Juan Carlos Ferrero** def. (France) Florent Serra 6–4, 7–5
      - Ferrero wins his first title in five years.
  - U.S. Men's Clay Court Championships in Houston, Texas, United States:
    - Final: (Australia) **Lleyton Hewitt** def. (United States) Wayne Odesnik 6–2, 7–5
      - Hewitt wins his first title in two years.
- WTA Tour:
  - MPS Group Championships in Ponte Vedra Beach, Florida, United States:
    - Final: (Denmark) **Caroline Wozniacki** def. (Canada) Aleksandra Wozniak, 6–1, 6–2
      - Wozniacki wins her fourth title in 8 months.
  - Andalucia Tennis Experience in Marbella, Spain:
    - Final: (Serbia) **Jelena Janković** def. (Spain) Carla Suárez Navarro, 6–3, 3–6, 6–3

==== Winter sports ====
===== Curling =====
- World Men's Championship in Moncton, New Brunswick, Canada: (seeding in parentheses)
  - Final: (gold) (2) **Scotland** 8–6 (silver) (1) Canada
    - A 2-stones steal in the 10th end gives Scotland its fifth title.
  - Bronze medal game: (3) Switzerland 4–6 (bronze) (4) **Norway**

=== April 11, 2009 (Saturday) ===
==== Auto racing ====
- Nationwide Series:
  - Pepsi 300 in Gladeville, Tennessee:
    - (1) Joey Logano (Connecticut) (Joe Gibbs Racing) (2) Kyle Busch (Nevada) (Joe Gibbs Racing) (3) Brad Keselowski (Michigan) (JR Motorsports)

==== Basketball ====
- NBA:
  - The Boston Celtics clinch second place in the Eastern Conference and secure home advantage in the second round of the playoff as a result of the Orlando Magic's 103–93 loss to the New Jersey Nets.

==== Cricket ====
- ICC World Cup qualifier in South Africa:
  - Super Eights:
    - In Benoni: Kenya 181 (43.5 ov); Canada 185/3 (34.3 ov). **Canada win by 7 wickets**.
    - In Pretoria: Namibia 280/7 (50 ov); United Arab Emirates 231/9 (50 ov). **Namibia win by 49 runs**.
    - In Krugersdorp: Afghanistan 218/7 (50 ov); Ireland 196 (47.3 ov). **Afghanistan win by 22 runs**.
    - In Johannesburg: Scotland 216/8 (50 ov); Netherlands 190 (48.4 ov). **Scotland win by 26 runs**.
      - Standings after 4 of 7 rounds: Canada, Ireland 6 points, Kenya, Netherlands, Scotland, UAE 4, Afghanistan, Namibia 2.
  - 9th–12th Place Playoffs:
    - In Potchefstroom: Uganda 292/6 (50 ov); Denmark 230/8 (50 ov). **Uganda win by 62 runs**.
    - In Potchefstroom: Oman 254 (48.1 ov); Bermuda 256/2 (48.2 ov). **Bermuda win by 8 wickets**.
      - Uganda and Bermuda will play for 9th place, while Denmark and Oman will play for 11th.

==== Cycling ====
- UCI ProTour:
  - Vuelta al País Vasco:
    - Stage 6: (1) Alberto Contador (Spain) (Astana) 31min 59sec (2) Antonio Colom (Spain) (Euskaltel–Euskadi) at 0:22 (3) Samuel Sánchez (Spain) (Silence–Lotto) 0:45
    - General classification – Final: (1) Contador 20hr 48min 30sec (2) Colom at 0:30 (3) Sanchez 0:53

==== Golf ====
- Men's majors:
  - The Masters in Augusta, Georgia, third round:
    - Leaders: (1) Ángel Cabrera (Argentina) & Kenny Perry (United States) 205 (−11) (3) Chad Campbell (United States) 207 (−9)

==== Ice hockey ====
- World U18 Championships in Fargo, North Dakota & Moorhead, Minnesota, United States:
  - Group A:
    - Sweden 5–4 Germany
    - Canada 8–1 Switzerland
  - Group B:
    - Russia 7–2 Slovakia
    - United States 4–3 Finland
- NHL:
  - The San Jose Sharks clinch the Presidents' Trophy for the League's best record as a result of the Boston Bruins' 6–1 loss to the Buffalo Sabres.
  - The Vancouver Canucks secure the Northwest Division title and the Western Conference third place with a 1–0 overtime win over the Colorado Avalanche.
- NCAA Division I men's tournament:
  - Frozen Four in Washington, D.C.:
    - Championship game: Boston University 4, Miami (Ohio) 3 (OT)
      - The Terriers score 2 goals in the last minute of the 3rd period to level the score, and win the game with Colby Cohen's goal 11:47 minutes in overtime.

==== Rugby union ====
- Heineken Cup quarter-finals:
  - **Cardiff Blues** (Wales) 9–6 (France) Toulouse in Cardiff
  - **Leicester Tigers** (England) 20–15 (England) Bath in Leicester

==== Shooting ====
- ISSF World Cup in Changwon, South Korea: (score in qualifying in parentheses)
  - Men's 50 metre pistol: (gold) Jin Jong-oh (South Korea) 674.6 (575) (silver) Leonid Yekimov (Russia) 665.0 (573) (bronze) Mikhail Nestruyev (Russia) 662.2 (567)
  - Women's 10 metre air rifle: (gold) Yin Wen (China) 500.6 (396) (silver) Xie Jieqiong (China) 500.5 (398) (bronze) Lee Da-hye (South Korea) 499.7 (398)
  - Women's 25 metre pistol: (gold) Wu Yan (China) 790.5 (586) (silver) Yuliya Bondareva (Kazakhstan) 788.9 (589) (bronze) Stefanie Thurmann (Germany) 787.2 (582)

==== Winter sports ====
===== Curling =====
- World Men's Championship in Moncton, New Brunswick, Canada: (seeding in parentheses)
  - Playoff:
    - (3) **Switzerland** 5–4 (4) Norway (11 ends)
      - Switzerland advance to the semifinal, Norway go to bronze medal game.
  - Semifinal:
    - (3) Switzerland 5–6 (1) **Canada**
      - Canada advance to the final, Switzerland go to bronze medal game.

=== April 10, 2009 (Friday) ===
==== Basketball ====
- NBA:
  - The Detroit Pistons and the Chicago Bulls clinch the last two playoff berths in the Eastern Conference. The Pistons book their eighth straight playoff spot with a 100–93 win over the New Jersey Nets, while the Bulls advance as a result of the Charlotte Bobcats' 84–81 loss to the Oklahoma City Thunder.
  - The Cleveland Cavaliers secure first place in the Eastern Conference and home advantage for the first three rounds with a 102–92 win over the Philadelphia 76ers. The Cavaliers lead over the Los Angeles Lakers by 1½ games in the race for first place in the NBA and home advantage in the final series.
  - The Atlanta Hawks clinch fourth place in the Eastern Conference and home advantage in the first round with a 122–118 win over the Indiana Pacers.

==== Cycling ====
- UCI ProTour:
  - Vuelta al País Vasco:
    - Stage 5: (1) Marco Pinotti (Italy) (Team Columbia–High Road) 4hr 15min 56sec (2) Ben Swift (England) (Team Katusha) + 19" (3) Francesco Gavazzi (Italy) (Lampre–NGC) s.t.
    - General classification: (1) Alberto Contador (Spain) (Astana) 20h16min 31sec (2) Samuel Sánchez (Spain) (Euskaltel–Euskadi) + 8" (3) Cadel Evans (Australia) (Silence–Lotto) s.t.

==== Golf ====
- Men's majors:
  - The Masters in Augusta, Georgia, second round:
    - Leaders: (1) Chad Campbell (United States) & Kenny Perry (United States) 135 (−9) (3) Ángel Cabrera (Argentina) 136 (−8)

==== Ice hockey ====
- Kontinental Hockey League:
  - Gagarin Cup final best-of-7 series:
    - Game 6: Lokomotiv Yaroslavl 2–3 (OT) Ak Bars Kazan. **Series tied 3–3**.
- Women's World Championships in Hameenlinna, Finland:
  - Group D: United States 1–2 Canada
    - Both teams advance to the final.
  - Group E: Russia 0–8 Sweden
    - Sweden advance to the bronze medal game against Finland.
  - Relegation round: Japan 2–1 China
    - Both teams are relegated to Division I in 2011.
- World U18 Championships in Fargo, North Dakota & Moorhead, Minnesota, United States:
  - Group A:
    - Switzerland 2–6 Czech Republic
  - Group B:
    - Slovakia 5–2 Norway
- NHL:
  - The St. Louis Blues and the Anaheim Ducks clinch the last two playoff berths in the Western Conference. The Blues win 3–1 over the Columbus Blue Jackets and the Ducks win 4–3 in shootout over the Dallas Stars.

==== Shooting ====
- ISSF World Cup in Changwon, South Korea: (score in qualifying in parentheses)
  - Men's 10 metre air rifle: (gold) Zhu Qinan (China) 700.3 (597) (silver) Cao Yifei (China) 698.6 (595) (bronze) Gagan Narang (India) 696.7 (594)

==== Winter sports ====
===== Curling =====
- World Men's Championship in Moncton, New Brunswick, Canada: (seeding in parentheses)
  - Tie-breakers: (winners advance to the playoff)
    - **Norway** 10–2 United States
    - Germany 7–8 **Switzerland**
  - Playoff: (6.30 pm ET)
    - (1) Canada 5–7 (2) **Scotland**
      - Scotland advance to the final, Canada go to the semifinal.

=== April 9, 2009 (Thursday) ===
==== American football ====
- National Football League:
  - Commissioner Roger Goodell suspends Buffalo Bills running back Marshawn Lynch for the first three games of the 2009 season for violating the league's personal conduct policy. Lynch was arrested on February 11 near Los Angeles after a police officer found a 9 mm semiautomatic handgun in the trunk of a parked car carrying him, and later pleaded guilty to a misdemeanor gun charge and sentenced to 80 hours of community service and three years' probation.

==== Baseball ====
- Major League Baseball:
  - Nick Adenhart, a rookie starting pitcher for the Los Angeles Angels of Anaheim is killed along with three others in a car accident in Fullerton, California, just hours after starting a game for the Angels. The Angels' scheduled game with the Oakland Athletics is postponed. (ESPN)

==== Basketball ====
- Euroleague Quarterfinals:
  - Game 5:
    - Regal FC Barcelona (Spain) 78–62 (Spain) TAU Cerámica. **Barcelona win series 3–2**.

==== Cricket ====
- Australia in South Africa:
  - 3rd ODI in Cape Town
    - South Africa 289/6 (50 ov); Australia 264/7 (50 ov). **South Africa win by 25 runs, lead 5-match series 2–1**.

==== Cycling ====
- UCI ProTour:
  - Vuelta al País Vasco:
    - Stage 4: (1) Michael Albasini (Switzerland) (Team Columbia–High Road) 3h 59' 42" (2) Jurgen Van den Broeck (Belgium) (Silence–Lotto) s.t. (3) Christian Vande Velde (United States) (Garmin–Slipstream) s.t.
    - General Classification: (1) Alberto Contador (Spain) (Astana) 16h 00' 16" (2) Samuel Sánchez (Spain) (Euskaltel–Euskadi) + 8" (3) Cadel Evans (Australia) Silence–Lotto s.t.

==== Football (soccer) ====
- UEFA Cup quarterfinals, first leg:
  - Shakhtar Donetsk (Ukraine) 2–0 (France) Marseille
  - Hamburg (Germany) 3–1 (England) Manchester City
  - Paris Saint-Germain (France) 0–0 (Ukraine) Dynamo Kyiv
  - Werder Bremen (Germany) 3–1 (Italy) Udinese
- Copa Libertadores group stage: (teams in **bold** advance to the last-16 stage)
  - Group 1:
    - LDU Quito (Ecuador) 1–1 (Chile) Colo-Colo
      - Colo-Colo lead the group with 7 points from 4 games, followed by Sport Recife with 6 points from 3 games.
  - Group 2:
    - Boca Juniors (Argentina) 3–1 (Paraguay) Guaraní
      - Boca Juniora win their fourth straight game, and lead the group with 12 points, while Guaraní lose their fourth game.
  - Group 4:
    - **São Paulo** (Brazil) 2–1 (Uruguay) Defensor Sporting
      - São Paulo, who led the group on 10 points from 4 games, secure a berth in the last 16 stage.

==== Golf ====
- Men's majors:
  - The Masters in Augusta, Georgia, first round:
    - Leaders: (1) Chad Campbell (United States) 65 (−7) (2) Jim Furyk (United States) & Hunter Mahan (United States) 66 (−6)

==== Ice hockey ====
- Women's World Championships in Hameenlinna, Finland:
  - Group D: Finland 0–7 United States
    - USA and Canada advance to the final; Finland will play for bronze medal against Sweden or Russia.
  - Group E: Kazakhstan 2–9 Russia
  - Relegation round: Switzerland 3–2 Japan
    - Switzerland's win allows them to stay in the Top Division; China and Japan are relegated to Division I for 2011.
- World U18 Championships in Fargo, North Dakota & Moorhead, Minnesota, United States:
  - Group A:
    - Czech Republic 0–7 Sweden
    - Germany 2–11 Canada
  - Group B:
    - Finland 7–4 Russia
    - Norway 0–8 United States
- NCAA Division I men's tournament:
  - Frozen Four in Washington, D.C.:
    - National Semifinals:
      - Boston University 5, Vermont 4
      - Miami (Ohio) 4, Bemidji State 1
- NHL:
  - The New York Rangers and the Montreal Canadiens clinch the last two playoff berths in the Eastern Conference. The Rangers win 2–1 over the Philadelphia Flyers, while the Canadiens lose 5–4 in overtime to the Boston Bruins.
  - The Washington Capitals clinch Eastern Conference second place with a 4–2 win over the Tampa Bay Lightning.
  - The New Jersey Devils clinch Atlantic Division title and Eastern Conference third place with a 3–2 shootout win over the Ottawa Senators.
  - The San Jose Sharks clinch Western Conference first place as a result of the Detroit Red Wings' loss to the Nashville Predators.

==== Winter sports ====
===== Curling =====
- World Men's Championship in Moncton, New Brunswick, Canada: (Teams in **bold** advance to the playoff, teams in italics secure at least a tiebreaker, teams in ~~strike~~ are eliminated)
  - Draw 15:
    - Denmark 4–10 **Canada**
    - ~~Finland~~ 7–9 China
    - Norway 11–7 ~~Japan~~
      - Norway come back from 1–6 down after 4 ends to secure a tiebreaker.
    - ~~Czech Republic~~ 6–2 France
  - Draw 16:
    - Switzerland 8–3 ~~Finland~~
    - Scotland 10–3 ~~Denmark~~
      - Scotland's win secure them at least a tiebreaker.
    - United States 7–6 ~~Czech Republic~~
    - Germany 9–3 Norway
  - Draw 17: (in progress)
    - ~~France~~ 6–9 United States
      - 4-points steal in the 10th end gives USA a tiebreaker spot.
    - ~~Japan~~ 3–5 Germany
    - ~~China~~ 4–5 Switzerland
    - **Canada** 5–6 **Scotland** (11 ends)
      - Scotland's win gives them a playoff berth, and a rematch against Canada on Friday.
  - Final standings after 17 draws: **Canada** 10–1, **Scotland** 8–3, Norway, USA, Germany, Switzerland 7–4, ~~Denmark~~ 5–6, ~~France~~, ~~China~~ 4–7, ~~Japan~~, ~~Czech Rep.~~ 3–8, ~~Finland~~ 1–10.

=== April 8, 2009 (Wednesday) ===
==== Basketball ====
- NBA:
  - The Dallas Mavericks clinch the eighth and final playoff berth in the Western Conference with 130–101 win over the Utah Jazz.

==== Cricket ====
- ICC World Cup qualifier in South Africa: (teams in **bold** advance to the Super Eight)
  - Group A:
    - In Benoni: **Canada** 252/7 (50 ov); **Scotland** 104 (30.5 ov). **Canada win by 148 runs**.
    - In Pretoria: Uganda 298/5 (50 ov); Oman 302/9 (37.1 ov). **Oman win by 1 wicket**.
    - In Johannesburg: **Namibia** 213/9 (50 ov); **Ireland** 214/3 (45 ov). **Ireland win by 7 wickets**.
      - Oman's win over Uganda gives Namibia the last berth in the Super Eight by better net run rate.
  - Group B:
    - In Potchefstroom: **Netherlands** 304/9 (50 ov); Bermuda 241/9 (50 ov). **Netherlands win by 63 runs**.
    - In Vanderbijlpark: **Afghanistan** 251/8 (50 ov); **United Arab Emirates** 257/5 (47.2 ov). **United Arab Emirates win by 5 wickets**.
    - In Potchefstroom: Denmark 173/8 (50 ov); **Kenya** 174/1 (33.1 ov). **Kenya win by 9 wickets**.
      - Afghanistan clinch the fourth berth in the Super Eight despite their loss, as Bermuda lose as well.

==== Cycling ====
- UCI ProTour:
  - Gent–Wevelgem:
    - (1) Edvald Boasson Hagen (Norway) (Team Columbia–High Road) 5hr 00min 15sec (2) Aleksandr Kuschynski (Belarus) (Liquigas) s.t. (3) Matthew Goss (Australia) (Team Saxo Bank) 0:53sec
  - Vuelta al País Vasco:
    - Stage 3: (1) Alberto Contador (Spain) (Astana) 4hr 16min 29sec (2) Cadel Evans (Australia) (Silence–Lotto) at 9sec (3) Samuel Sánchez (Spain) (Euskaltel–Euskadi) s.t.
    - General classification: (1) Contador 11hr 59min 08sec (2) Sanchez at 9sec (3) Evans s.t.

==== Football (soccer) ====
- UEFA Champions League Quarterfinals, first leg:
  - Liverpool (England) 1–3 (England) Chelsea
  - Barcelona (Spain) 4–0 (Germany) Bayern Munich
- Copa Libertadores group stage:
  - Group 1:
    - Sport Recife (Brazil) 0–2 (Brazil) Palmeiras
  - Group 5:
    - Estudiantes (Argentina) 4–0 (Brazil) Cruzeiro
      - Cruzeiro lead the group with 10 points from 5 games, followed by Estudiantes with 9 points.
  - Group 7:
    - Universidad de Chile 3–0 (Colombia) Boyacá Chicó
  - Group 8:
    - San Luis (Mexico) 2–0 (Argentina) San Lorenzo
      - San Luis' win keep their qualifying hopes alive and eliminates San Lorenzo. However, the Mexicans can advance only if they beat Libertad in Asunción and Universitario lose to San Lorenzo.
- CONCACAF Champions League semifinals, second leg: (First leg result in parentheses)
  - **Atlante** (Mexico) 3–1 (1–2) (Mexico) Santos Laguna
    - Atlante win 4–3 on aggregate.
- AFC Champions League group stage, matchday 3:
  - Group B:
    - Sharjah (United Arab Emirates) 1–3 (Saudi Arabia) Al-Shabab
    - Persepolis (Iran) 3–1 (Qatar) Al-Gharafa
      - Al-Shabab and Persepolis lead the group with 7 points.
  - Group D:
    - Bunyodkor (Uzbekistan) 2–2 (Iran) Sepahan
    - Al-Ettifaq (Saudi Arabia) 4–1 (United Arab Emirates) Al-Shabab Al-Arabi
      - Al-Ettifaq lead the group with 6 points.
  - Group F:
    - Gamba Osaka (Japan) 5–0 (Indonesia) Sriwijaya
    - Shandong Luneng (China) 2–0 (South Korea) Seoul
      - Gamba Osaka score third straight win and lead the group with 9 points.
  - Group H:
    - Central Coast Mariners (Australia) 0–5 (Japan) Kawasaki Frontale
    - Pohang Steelers (South Korea) 1–0 (China) Tianjin Teda
      - Kawasaki lead the group with 7 points.

==== Ice hockey ====
- Kontinental Hockey League:
  - Gagarin Cup final best-of-7 series:
    - Game 5: Ak Bars Kazan 2–3 Lokomotiv Yaroslavl. **Lokomotiv lead series 3–2**.
- Women's World Championships in Hameenlinna, Finland:
  - Group D: Canada 8–0 Finland
  - Group E: Sweden 9–0 Kazakhstan
  - Relegation round: China 4–5 (SO) Switzerland
- NHL:
  - The Columbus Blue Jackets clinch a playoff berth for the first time in franchise history with a 4–3 win after a shootout over the Chicago Blackhawks.

==== Winter sports ====
===== Curling =====
- World Men's Championship in Moncton, New Brunswick, Canada: (Teams in **bold** advance to the playoff, teams in italics secure at least a tiebreaker, teams in ~~strike~~ are eliminated)
  - Draw 12:
    - Czech Republic 3–9 Japan
    - Norway 10–4 France
    - ~~Finland~~ 4–12 Canada
    - Denmark 6–7 China (11 ends)
  - Draw 13:
    - China 6–8 Germany
    - **Canada** 9–6 United States
    - France 1–9 Scotland
    - Japan 4–7 Switzerland
  - Draw 14:
    - Scotland 6–5 Norway (11 ends)
    - Switzerland 5–2 ~~Czech Republic~~
    - Germany 4–5 Denmark
    - United States 6–5 ~~Finland~~
  - Standings after 14 draws: **Canada** 9–0, Scotland, Norway 6–3, Denmark, USA, Germany, Switzerland 5–4, France 4–5, Japan, China 3–6, ~~Czech Rep.~~ 2–7, ~~Finland~~ 1–8.

=== April 7, 2009 (Tuesday) ===
==== Baseball ====
- Major League Baseball season opening games:
  - American League:
    - Chicago White Sox 4, Kansas City Royals 2
    - Boston Red Sox 5, Tampa Bay Rays 3
      - Both games were postponed from Monday due to bad weather.
  - National League:
    - San Francisco Giants 10, Milwaukee Brewers 6

==== Basketball ====
- NCAA women's Division I tournament:
  - Final Four in St. Louis, Missouri:
    - National Championship Game:
      - (Trenton 1) Connecticut 76, (Raleigh 3) Louisville 54
        - The Huskies complete a perfect 39–0 season and win their sixth championship. UConn's Tina Charles is named Most Outstanding Player.
- NBA:
  - The New Orleans Hornets clinch the seventh playoff berth in the Western Conference with a 93–87 overtime win over the Miami Heat.

==== Cricket ====
- India in New Zealand:
  - 3rd Test in Wellington, day 5:
    - India 379 & 434/7d; New Zealand 197 & 281/8 (Ross Taylor 107). **Match abandoned due to rain and drawn. India win 3-Test series 1–0.**

==== Cycling ====
- UCI ProTour:
  - Vuelta al País Vasco:
    - Stage 2: (1) Yury Trofimov (Russia) (Bbox Bouygues Telecom) 4h 12' 46" (2) Rein Taaramäe (Estonia) (Cofidis) + 6" (3) Ben Swift (United Kingdom) (Team Katusha) + 1' 10"
    - General Classification: (1) Luis León Sánchez (Spain) (Caisse d'Epargne) 3h 28' 43" (2) Samuel Sánchez (Spain) (Euskaltel–Euskadi) s.t. (3) Jérôme Pineau (France) (Quick-Step) s.t.

==== Football (soccer) ====
- UEFA Champions League Quarterfinals, first leg:
  - Villarreal (Spain) 1–1 (England) Arsenal
  - Manchester United (England) 2–2 (Portugal) Porto
- Copa Libertadores group stage: (Teams in **bold** advance to the last-16 stage)
  - Group 3:
    - Nacional (Paraguay) 1–1 (Peru) U. San Martín
    - River Plate (Argentina) 0–0 Nacional
      - Nacional (Uruguay) lead the group with 10 points from 4 games, and need one more point to qualify to the Last-16.
  - Group 7:
    - Grêmio (Brazil) 3–0 (Bolivia) Aurora
      - Gremio lead the group with 10 points from 4 games.
  - Group 8:
    - Universitario (Peru) 2–1 (Paraguay) **Libertad**
      - Libertad, who already qualified, lead the group with 12 points from 5 games, ahead of Universitario on 8 points. A draw between San Lorenzo and San Luis on Wednesday will give the Peruvians a berth in the last 16.
- CONCACAF Champions League semifinals, second leg: (First leg result in parentheses)
  - **Cruz Azul** (Mexico) 3–1 AET(0–2) Puerto Rico Islanders
    - 3–3 on aggregate. Cruz Azul win 4–2 in penalties.
- AFC Champions League group stage, matchday 3:
  - Group A:
    - Saba Battery (Iran) 0–2 (Uzbekistan) Pakhtakor Tashkent
    - Al-Hilal (Saudi Arabia) 2–1 (United Arab Emirates) Al-Ahli
      - Pakhtakor lead the group with 7 points.
  - Group C:
    - Al-Jazira (United Arab Emirates) 0–0 (Saudi Arabia) Al-Ittihad
    - Umm-Salal (Qatar) 1–0 (Iran) Esteghlal
      - Al-Ittihad lead the group with 7 points.
  - Group E:
    - Nagoya Grampus (Japan) 1–1 (Australia) Newcastle United Jets
    - Ulsan Hyundai Horang-i (South Korea) 1–0 (China) Beijing Guoan
      - Nagoya lead the group with 5 points.
  - Group G:
    - Singapore Armed Forces 1–4 (Japan) Kashima Antlers
    - Shanghai Shenhua (China) 2–1 (South Korea) Suwon Bluewings
      - Suwon, Kashima and Shanghai are level at the top on 6 points.

==== Ice hockey ====
- NHL:
  - The Philadelphia Flyers clinch a playoff berth with 2–1 win over the Florida Panthers.
  - The Pittsburgh Penguins clinch a playoff berth with 6–4 win over the Tampa Bay Lightning.

==== Winter sports ====
===== Curling =====
- World Men's Championship in Moncton, New Brunswick, Canada:
  - Draw 9:
    - Canada 8–3 Switzerland
    - China 9–7 Scotland
    - Japan 1–9 United States
    - France 5–7 Germany
  - Draw 10:
    - United States 6–9 Denmark
    - Germany 8–4 Finland
    - Switzerland 3–2 Norway
    - Scotland 4–5 Czech Republic
  - Draw 11:
    - Finland 2–8 France
    - Czech Republic 3–9 China
    - Denmark 8–4 Japan
    - Norway 2–9 Canada
  - Standings after 11 draws: Canada 7–0, Norway 5–2, Denmark, Scotland, USA, Germany, France 4–3, Switzerland 3–4, Japan, China, Czech Republic 2–5, Finland 1–6.

=== April 6, 2009 (Monday) ===
==== Baseball ====
- Major League Baseball season opening games:
  - National League:
    - New York Mets 2, Cincinnati Reds 1
    - Arizona Diamondbacks 9, Colorado Rockies 8
    - Florida Marlins 12, Washington Nationals 6
    - Pittsburgh Pirates 6, St. Louis Cardinals 4
    - Chicago Cubs 4, Houston Astros 2
    - Los Angeles Dodgers 4, San Diego Padres 1
  - American League:
    - Texas Rangers 9, Cleveland Indians 1
    - Baltimore Orioles 10, New York Yankees 5
      - CC Sabathia loses his first start for the Yankees.
    - Toronto Blue Jays 12, Detroit Tigers 5
    - Seattle Mariners 6, Minnesota Twins 1
      - This game kicked off the Twins' final season at the Metrodome.
    - Los Angeles Angels 3, Oakland Athletics 0
    - Kansas City Royals at Chicago White Sox, postponed due to snow
    - Tampa Bay Rays at Boston Red Sox, postponed due to rain

==== Basketball ====
- NCAA men's Division I tournament:
  - Final Four in Detroit, Michigan:
    - National Championship Game:
      - (South 1) North Carolina 89, (Midwest 2) Michigan State 72
        - The Tar Heels set championship game records with 55 points and a 21-point half time lead that the Spartans are not able to overcome. UNC's Wayne Ellington was named Most Outstanding Player.
- Basketball Hall of Fame 2009 inductees are announced:
  - Players: Michael Jordan, David Robinson, John Stockton.
  - Coaches: Jerry Sloan, C. Vivian Stringer

==== Cricket ====
- India in New Zealand:
  - 3rd Test in Wellington, day 4:
    - India 379 & 434/7d (116 ov.); New Zealand 197 & 167/4 (56 ov.). New Zealand require another 450 runs with 6 wickets remaining.
- ICC World Cup qualifier in South Africa: (teams in **bold** advance to the Super Eight, teams in italics are eliminated)
  - Group A:
    - In Benoni: **Canada** 220 (48 ov); **Ireland** 223/4 (41 ov). **Ireland win by 6 wickets**.
    - In Krugersdorp: Namibia 291/9 (50 ov); Oman 172 (43.4 ov). **Namibia win by 119 runs**.
    - In Johannesburg: **Scotland** 209/8 (50 ov); Uganda 164 (43.1 ov). **Scotland win by 45 runs**.
      - Ireland remain the only unbeaten team with 8 points, followed by Canada and Scotland on 6 points. Namibia, Uganda and Oman fight for one remaining spot in the Super Eight.
  - Group B:
    - In Potchefstroom: Bermuda 259/5 (50 ov); **Kenya** 260/3 (45 ov). **Kenya win by 7 wickets**.
    - In Vanderbijlpark: Afghanistan 204/9 (50 ov); **Netherlands** 208/5 (46.2 ov). **Netherlands win by 5 wickets**.
    - In Potchefstroom: **United Arab Emirates** 379/6 (50 ov); Denmark 267 (44.4 ov). **United Arab Emirates won by 112 runs**.
      - Kenya, Netherlands and UAE are level at the top on 6 points. Afghanistan (4 pts) or Bermuda (2 pts) will clinch the last spot in the Super Eight.

==== Cycling ====
- UCI ProTour:
  - Vuelta al País Vasco:
    - Stage 1: (1) Luis León Sánchez (Spain) (Caisse d'Epargne) (2) Samuel Sánchez (Spain) (Euskaltel–Euskadi) (3) Jérôme Pineau (France) (Quick-Step)

==== Ice hockey ====
- Kontinental Hockey League:
  - Gagarin Cup final best-of-7 series:
    - Game 4: Lokomotiv Yaroslavl 2–5 Ak Bars Kazan. **Series level 2–2**.
- Women's World Championships in Hameenlinna, Finland: (teams in **bold** advance to Group D, teams in italics advance to group E, teams in ~~strike~~ go to Relegation round)
  - Pool A: **United States** 8–0 Russia
  - Pool B: **Canada** 7–0 Sweden
  - Pool C: **Finland** 6–3 ~~Switzerland~~

==== Winter sports ====
===== Curling =====
- World Men's Championship in Moncton, New Brunswick, Canada:
  - Draw 6:
    - Germany 9–8 Czech Republic (11 ends)
    - United States 5–7 Norway
    - Scotland 7–2 Finland
    - Switzerland 9–6 Denmark
  - Draw 7:
    - Norway 7–6 China
    - Czech Republic 4–10 Canada
    - Denmark 7–3 France
    - Finland 7–10 Japan
  - Draw 8:
    - Japan 5–7 Scotland
    - France 6–5 Switzerland
    - Canada 6–4 Germany
    - China 8–9 United States (11 ends)
  - Standings after 8 draws: Canada, Norway 5–0, Scotland 4–1, USA, France 3–2, Switzerland, Denmark, Germany, Japan 2–3, Finland, Czech Rep. 1–4, China 0–5.

=== April 5, 2009 (Sunday) ===
==== Athletics ====
- Paris Marathon:
  - Men: (1) Vincent Kipruto (Kenya) 2:05:47 (2) Bazu Worku (Ethiopia) 2:06:15 (3) David Kiyeng (Kenya) 2:06:26
  - Women: (2) Atsede Baysa (Kenya) 2:24:42 (2) Aselefech Mergia (Ethiopia) 2:25:02 (3) Christelle Daunay (France) 2:25:43

==== Auto racing ====
- Formula One:
  - Malaysian Grand Prix in Sepang, Malaysia:
    - (1) Jenson Button (United Kingdom) (Brawn-Mercedes) (2) Nick Heidfeld (Germany) (BMW Sauber) +22.7 secs (3) Timo Glock (Germany) (Toyota) +23.5 secs
      - The race is called off after 31 laps, and therefore half of the points are awarded.
      - Drivers' standings after 2 races: (1) Button 15 points (2) Rubens Barrichello (Brazil) 10 (3) Jarno Trulli (Italy) 8.5
- Sprint Cup Series:
  - Samsung 500 in Fort Worth, Texas:
    - (1) Jeff Gordon (California) (Hendrick Motorsports) (2) Jimmie Johnson (California) (Hendrick Motorsports) (3) Greg Biffle (Washington (state)) (Roush Fenway Racing)
      - Drivers' standings after 7 races: (1) Gordon 1154 points (2) Johnson −162 (3) Kurt Busch (Nevada) −180
- IndyCar Series:
  - Honda Grand Prix of St. Petersburg in St. Petersburg, Florida:
    - (1) Ryan Briscoe (Australia) (Penske Racing) 2:12:26.8387 (2) Ryan Hunter-Reay (United States) (Vision Racing) +0.4619 (3) Justin Wilson (United Kingdom) (Dale Coyne Racing) +0.9490
- World Rally Championship:
  - Rally de Portugal:
    - (1) Sébastien Loeb (France) (Citroën C4) 3:53:13.1 (2) Mikko Hirvonen (Finland) (Ford Focus RS) 3:53:37.4 (3) Dani Sordo (Spain) Citroën C4 3:54:58.5
      - Drivers' standings after 4 of 12 races: (1) Loeb 40 points (2) Hirvonen 30 (3) Sordo 23

==== Baseball ====
- (United States) (Canada) Major League Baseball season opening game:
  - Atlanta Braves 4, Philadelphia Phillies 1
    - The Braves spoil the Phils' World Series celebration with three homers in the first two innings, plus eight shutout innings from starting pitcher Derek Lowe.

==== Basketball ====
- NCAA women's Division I tournament:
  - Final Four in St. Louis, Missouri:
    - National Semifinals:
      - (Raleigh 3) Louisville 61, (Oklahoma City 1) Oklahoma 59
      - (Trenton 1) Connecticut 83, (Berkeley 2) Stanford 64
- Eurocup Final eight in Turin, Italy:
  - Final: Lietuvos Rytas (Lithuania) 80–74 (Russia) Khimki Moscow Region
    - Lietuvos Rytas win the Eurocup for the second time, and book a place in next season's EuroLeague.
- EuroLeague Women Final Four in Salamanca, Spain:
  - Final: Spartak Moscow (Russia) 85–70 (Spain) Salamanca
    - Spartak win the trophy for third straight year.
  - 3rd place playoff: Ekaterinburg (Russia) 80–56 (Hungary) Sopron
- NBA:
  - The Portland Trail Blazers and Houston Rockets clinch playoff berths as a result of the Phoenix Suns' 140–116 loss to the Dallas Mavericks. For Portland it's the first playoff since 2003. Phoenix now trails Dallas by 4 games in the race for the last playoff spot in the Western Conference, with 5 games remaining.
  - The Utah Jazz also clinch a playoff berth, with a 108–94 win over the New Orleans Hornets. The Hornets need one win or a Suns loss to clinch a playoff berth.

==== Cricket ====
- India in New Zealand:
  - 3rd Test in Wellington, day 3:
    - India 379 and 349/5 (Gautam Gambhir 167); New Zealand 197. India lead by 531 runs with 5 wickets remaining.
- Australia in South Africa:
  - 2nd ODI in Centurion:
    - Australia 131 (40.2 ov); South Africa 132/3 (26.2 ov). **South Africa win by 7 wickets, 5-match series level 1–1**.

==== Cycling ====
- UCI ProTour:
  - Tour of Flanders:
    - (1) Stijn Devolder (Belgium) (Quick-Step) 6h 1' 4" (2) Heinrich Haussler (Germany) (Cervélo TestTeam) + 59" (3) Philippe Gilbert (Belgium) (Silence–Lotto) s.t.

==== Football (soccer) ====
- OFC Champions League Group stage, matchday 6:
  - Group A: Waitakere United (New Zealand) 1–3 (New Zealand) Auckland City FC
    - Auckland advance to the final.

==== Golf ====
- PGA Tour:
  - Shell Houston Open in Humble, Texas:
    - Winner: Paul Casey (England) 277 (−11)
      - Casey beat J. B. Holmes on the first playoff hole for his first PGA Tour title, and earns a trip to the Masters.
- European Tour:
  - Estoril Open de Portugal in Cascais, Portugal:
    - Winner: Michael Hoey (Northern Ireland) 277 (−7)
      - Hoey beat Gonzalo Fernández-Castaño on the third playoff hole for his first European Tour title.
- LPGA Tour — Major championship:
  - Kraft Nabisco Championship in Rancho Mirage, California:
    - Winner: Brittany Lincicome (United States) 279 (−9)
      - An eagle on the final hole gives Lincicome her first major, edging out fellow Americans Kristy McPherson and Cristie Kerr by one stroke.

==== Gymnastics ====
- European Artistic Gymnastics Championships in Milan, Italy:
  - Men:
    - Floor: (gold) Fabian Hambuechen (Germany) (silver) Matthias Fahrig (Germany) (bronze) Eleftherios Kosmidis (Greece) (bronze) Alexander Shatilov (Israel)
    - Pommel horse: (gold) Krisztián Berki (Hungary) (silver) Louis Smith (United Kingdom) (bronze) Daniel Keatings (United Kingdom)
    - Rings: (gold) Yuri van Gelder (Netherlands) (silver) Olexandr Vorobiov (Ukraine) (bronze) Yordan Yovchev (Bulgaria)
    - Vault: (gold) Thomas Bouhail (France) (silver) Flavius Koczi (Romania) (bronze) Matthias Fahrig (Germany)
    - Parallel bars: (gold) Yann Cucherat (France) (silver) Mitja Petkovšek (Slovenia) (bronze) Fabian Hambuechen (Germany)
    - High bar: (gold) Vlasios Maras (Greece) (silver) Yann Cucherat (France) (bronze) Nikolay Kuksenkov (Ukraine)
  - Women:
    - Vault: (gold) Ariella Kaeslin (Switzerland) (silver) Yulia Berger (Russia) (bronze) Anna Kalashnyk (Ukraine)
    - Asymmetric bars: (gold) Elizabeth Tweddle (United Kingdom) (silver) Ksenia Semenova (Russia) (bronze) Anja Brinker (Germany)
    - Beam: (gold) Yana Demyanchuk (Ukraine) (silver) Anamaria Tămârjan (Romania) (bronze) Gabriela Drăgoi (Romania)
    - Floor: (gold) Elizabeth Tweddle (United Kingdom) (silver) Vanessa Ferrari (Italy) (bronze) Ksenia Semenova (Russia)

==== Ice hockey ====
- Women's World Championships in Hameenlinna, Finland: (teams in italics go to the Relegation round)
  - Pool A: Russia 3–1 Japan
  - Pool B: Sweden 6–1 China
  - Pool C: Switzerland 1–2(SO) Kazakhstan
- Kontinental Hockey League:
  - Gagarin Cup final, game 3:
    - Lokomotiv Yaroslavl 3–0 Ak Bars Kazan. **Lokomotiv leads best-of-7 series 2–1**.

==== Motorcycle racing ====
- Superbike World Championship:
  - Valencia Superbike World Championship round in Valencia, Spain
  - Superbike:
    - Race 1: (1) Noriyuki Haga (Japan) (2) Michel Fabrizio (Italy) (3) Max Neukirchner (Germany)
    - Race 2: (1) Haga (2) Ben Spies (United States) (3) Fabrizio
      - Riders' standings (after 3 of 14 events): (1) Haga 135 points (2) Spies 95 (3) Neukirchner 65

==== Rugby union ====
- Sevens World Series:
  - Australia Sevens in Adelaide:
    - Final: Kenya 7–26 South Africa
      - World Series standings after 6 of 8 events: (1) South Africa 104 points (2) England 76 (3) Fiji 74

==== Snooker ====
- China Open in Beijing, China: (seeding in parentheses; best-of-19 frames)
  - Final: Peter Ebdon (England) (9) 10–8 John Higgins MBE (Scotland) (5)

==== Tennis ====
- ATP Tour:
  - Sony Ericsson Open in Key Biscayne, Florida, United States
    - Final: (United Kingdom) **Andy Murray** def. (Serbia) Novak Djokovic, 6–2, 7–5.
      - Murray wins his 3rd title of the year and 3rd Masters 1000 of his career.

==== Winter sports ====
===== Curling =====
- World Men's Championship in Moncton, New Brunswick, Canada:
  - Draw 3:
    - United States 6–12 Scotland
    - Germany 10–9 Switzerland (11 ends)
  - Draw 4:
    - Canada 7–2 France
    - Denmark 7–5 Finland
    - Norway 8–2 Czech Republic
    - Japan 10–2 China
  - Draw 5:
    - Switzerland 3–10 United States
    - France 8–2 Japan
    - China 4–9 Canada
    - Scotland 11–8 Germany
  - Standings after 5 draws: Canada, Norway 3–0, Scotland, USA, France 2–1, Czech Rep., Denmark, Finland, Germany, Japan, Switzerland 1–2, China 0–3.

=== April 4, 2009 (Saturday) ===
==== Auto racing ====
- Nationwide Series:
  - O'Reilly 300 in Fort Worth, Texas:
    - (1) Kyle Busch (Nevada) (Joe Gibbs Racing) (2) Tony Stewart (Indiana) (Kevin Harvick Incorporated) (3) Brad Keselowski (Michigan) (JR Motorsports)
- American Le Mans Series:
  - Sports Car Challenge of St. Petersburg in St. Petersburg, Florida, United States
    - (1) David Brabham (Australia) & Scott Sharp (United States) (2) Adrian Fernández (Mexico) & Luis Díaz (Mexico) (3) Chris Dyson (United States) & Guy Smith (United Kingdom)

==== Basketball ====
- NCAA men's Division I tournament:
  - Final Four in Detroit, Michigan:
    - National Semifinals:
      - (Midwest 2) Michigan State 82, (West 1) Connecticut 73
      - (South 1) North Carolina 83, (East 3) Villanova 69
- Women's National Invitation Tournament:
  - Final in Lawrence, Kansas:
    - South Florida 75, Kansas 71
- Eurocup Final Eight in Turin, Italy:
  - Semifinals:
    - Hemofarm (Serbia) 68–73 (Lithuania) Lietuvos Rytas
    - Khimki Moscow Region (Russia) 79–73 (Spain) Iurbentia Bilbao
- NBA:
  - The Philadelphia 76ers clinch a playoff berth with 95–90 win over the Detroit Pistons.

==== Cricket ====
- India in New Zealand:
  - 3rd Test in Wellington, day 2:
    - India 379 (92.1 ov) & 51/1 (16 ov); New Zealand 197 (65 ov) (Zaheer Khan 5/65, 18 ov). India lead by 233 runs with 9 wickets remaining in the second innings.
- ICC World Cup qualifier in South Africa:
  - Group A:
    - In Pretoria: Canada 319 (50 ov); Namibia 178 (48 ov). **Canada win by 141 runs**.
    - In Krugersdorp: Uganda 155 (44.2 ov); Ireland 160/4 (31 ov). **Ireland win by 6 wickets**.
    - In Johannesburg: Scotland 274/9 (50 ov); Oman 265/9 (50 ov). **Scotland win by 9 runs**.
      - Ireland and Canada win their third straight match and advance to the Super Eights. Namibia and Oman suffer their third loss.
  - Group B:
    - In Potchefstroom: Kenya 282/5 (50 ov); Afghanistan 175 (47 ov). **Kenya win by 107 runs**.
    - In Vanderbijlpark: Denmark 157 (48.3 ov); Bermuda 160/1 (38.1 ov). **Bermuda win by 9 wickets**.
    - In Potchefstroom: Netherlands 265 (49.3 ov); United Arab Emirates 268/8 (49.1 ov). **United Arab Emirates win by 2 wickets**.
      - Kenya, Netherlands, Afghanistan and UAE are level at the top on 4 points.

==== Gymnastics ====
- European Artistic Gymnastics Championships in Milan, Italy:
  - Men's all-around: (gold) Fabian Hambuechen (Germany) 89.175 (silver) Daniel Keatings (United Kingdom) 88.275 (bronze) Yury Ryazanov (Russia) 88.200
  - Women's all-around: (gold) Ksenia Semenova (Russia) 58.175 (silver) Ksenia Afanasyeva (Russia) 57.600 (bronze) Ariella Kaeslin (Switzerland) 57.275

==== Horse racing ====
- Grand National in Aintree, England:
  - (1) Mon Mome, 100–1 (2) Comply or Die, 14–1 (3) My Will, 8–1

==== Ice hockey ====
- Women's World Championships in Hameenlinna, Finland:
  - Pool A: Japan 0–8 United States
  - Pool B: China 1–13 Canada
  - Pool C: Kazakhstan 0–7 Finland
- NHL:
  - The Carolina Hurricanes clinch a playoff berth with 3–2 overtime win over the Pittsburgh Penguins.
  - The Boston Bruins clinch Eastern Conference first place with 1–0 win over the New York Rangers.

==== Tennis ====
- WTA Tour:
  - Sony Ericsson Open in Key Biscayne, Florida, United States:
    - Final: (Belarus) **Victoria Azarenka** def. (United States) Serena Williams, 6–3, 6–1.
      - Azarenka wins her third title of the year.

==== Winter sports ====
===== Curling =====
- World Men's Championship in Moncton, New Brunswick, Canada:
  - Draw 1:
    - Scotland 7–10 Switzerland (11 ends)
    - Norway 7–6 Denmark
    - Czech Republic 6–8 Finland (11 ends)
    - Germany 5–6 United States
  - Draw 2:
    - Finland 1–9 Norway
    - Japan 4–7 Canada
    - France 7–5 China
    - Czech Republic 9–4 Denmark
  - Standings after 2 draws: Norway 2–0, Canada, France, Switzerland, USA 1–0, Czech Rep., Finland 1–1, China, Germany, Japan, Scotland 0–1, Denmark 0–2.

===== Synchronized skating =====
- World Championships in Zagreb, Croatia
  - (gold) NEXXICE (Canada) 223.58 (silver) Team Unique (Finland) 220.28 (bronze) Team Surprise (Sweden) 209.30

=== April 3, 2009 (Friday) ===
==== Baseball ====
- (Japan) Nippon Professional Baseball Opening Day:
  - Central League:
    - Hiroshima Toyo Carp 6, Yomiuri Giants 3
    - Chunichi Dragons 4, Yokohama BayStars 1
    - Hanshin Tigers 5, Tokyo Yakult Swallows 2
  - Pacific League:
    - Tohoku Rakuten Golden Eagles 3, Hokkaido Nippon Ham Fighters 1
    - Saitama Seibu Lions 5, Chiba Lotte Marines 2
    - Fukuoka SoftBank Hawks 8, Orix Buffaloes 0

==== Basketball ====
- Euroleague Women Final Four in Salamanca, Spain:
  - Semifinals:
    - Spartak Moscow (Russia) 83–74 (Russia) Ekaterinburg
    - Salamanca (Spain) 85–78 (Hungary) Sopron
- Eurocup Final Eight in Turin, Italy:
  - Quarterfinals:
    - Pamesa Valencia (Spain) 73–76 (Russia) Khimki Moscow Region
    - Iurbentia Bilbao (Spain) 76–67 (Croatia) Zadar
- College Basketball Invitational:
  - Championship best-of-3 series, game 3 in El Paso, Texas:
    - Oregon State 81, UTEP 73. **Oregon State wins 2–1.**
- NBA:
  - The Miami Heat clinch a playoff berth with 97–92 win over the Charlotte Bobcats. The Heat become the second team in NBA history to reach the playoff after winning only 15 games the previous season.

==== Cricket ====
- India in New Zealand:
  - 3rd Test in Wellington, day 1:
    - India 375/9 (90 ov).
- England in West Indies:
  - 5th ODI in Gros Islet, St Lucia:
    - England 172/5 (29/29 ov); West Indies 146 (28.0/29 ov). **England win by 26 runs and win 5-match series 3–2**.
- Australia in South Africa:
  - 1st ODI in Durban:
    - Australia 286/7 (50 ov.); South Africa 145 (33.1 ov). **Australia win by 141 runs and lead 5-match series 1–0**.

==== Ice hockey ====
- NHL:
  - The Chicago Blackhawks clinch a playoff berth for the first time in seven years with 3–1 win over the Nashville Predators.
  - The Vancouver Canucks also clinch a playoff berth as a result of Nashville's loss to Chicago.
  - The Washington Capitals clinch the Southeast Division title with 4–5 overtime loss to the Buffalo Sabres.
- Kontinental Hockey League:
  - Gagarin Cup final, game 2:
    - Ak Bars Kazan 4–3(OT) Lokomotiv Yaroslavl. **Best-of-7 series tied 1–1**.

==== Winter sports ====
===== Synchronized skating =====
- World Championships in Zagreb, Croatia:
  - Short program: (1) Team Unique (Finland) 82.36 points (2) NEXXICE (Canada) 80.12 (3) Marigold IceUnity (Finland) 78.68

=== April 2, 2009 (Thursday) ===
==== Auto racing ====
- Formula One news:
  - Lewis Hamilton is disqualified from the Australian Grand Prix for giving misleading evidence to race stewards regarding Jarno Trulli's pass of him during a late safety car period. Trulli is restored to his original third-place position, and Hamilton's McLaren team is also stripped of its constructors' points. (AP/ESPN)

==== Basketball ====
- Euroleague Quarterfinals:
  - Game 4 of best-of-5 series:
    - Real Madrid (Spain) 75–78 (Greece) Olympiacos Piraeus. **Olympiacos wins series 3–1.**
    - TAU Cerámica (Spain) 63–84 (Spain) Regal FC Barcelona. **Series tied 2–2.**
    - Montepaschi Siena (Italy) 84–91 (Greece) Panathinaikos Athens. **Panathinaikos wins series 3–1.**
- Eurocup Final Eight in Turin, Italy:
  - Quarterfinals:
    - Dynamo Moscow (Russia) 85–93 (Serbia) Hemofarm
    - Benetton Treviso (Italy) 79–85 (Lithuania) Lietuvos Rytas
- National Invitation Tournament:
  - Final Four in New York:
    - Final: Penn State 69, Baylor 63

==== Cricket ====
- ICC World Cup qualifier in South Africa:
  - Group A:
    - In Pretoria: Scotland 267/6 (50 ov.); Namibia 194 (44.4 ov.). **Scotland win by 73 runs.**
    - In Krugersdorp: Ireland 285/4 (50 ov.); Oman 169 (37.3 ov.). **Ireland win by 116 runs.**
    - In Johannesburg: Uganda 231/8 (50 ov.); Canada 232/5 (47 ov.). **Canada win by 5 wickets.**
  - Group B:
    - In Potchefstroom: Denmark 245/8 (50 ov.); Netherlands 246/3 (43 ov.). **Netherlands win by 7 wickets.**
    - In Vanderbijlpark: United Arab Emirates 79 (30.2 ov.); Kenya 80/1 (12.2 ov.). **Kenya win by 9 wickets.**
    - In Potchefstroom: Afghanistan 239/9 (50 ov.); Bermuda 179 (49.3 ov). **Afghanistan win by 60 runs.**

==== Ice hockey ====
- NHL:
  - The Calgary Flames clinch a playoff berth with 2–1 win over the Dallas Stars, and draw level with the Vancouver Canucks at the top of the Northwest Division.
- Kontinental Hockey League:
  - Gagarin Cup final, game 1:
    - Ak Bars Kazan 0–3 Lokomotiv Yaroslavl. **Lokomotiv lead best-of-7 series 1–0.**

=== April 1, 2009 (Wednesday) ===
==== Basketball ====
- College Basketball Invitational:
  - Championship best-of-3 series, game 2 in El Paso, Texas:
    - UTEP 70, Oregon State 63. **Series tied 1–1**.
- Women's National Invitation Tournament:
  - Semifinals:
    - In Boston: South Florida 82, Boston College 65
    - In Lawrence, Kansas: Kansas 75, Illinois State 72

==== Cricket ====
- ICC World Cup qualifier in South Africa:
  - Group A:
    - In Benoni: Scotland 232/7 (50 ov); Ireland 233/3 (37.4 ov). **Ireland win by 7 wickets**.
    - In Pretoria: Canada 247 (49.3 ov); Oman 144 (40 ov). **Canada win by 103 runs**.
    - In Krugersdorp: Uganda 234/7 (50 ov); Namibia 228/9 (50 ov). **Uganda win by 6 runs**.
  - Group B:
    - In Potchefstroom: Kenya 247/8 (50 ov); Netherlands 248/3 (46.2 ov). **Netherlands win by 7 wickets**.
    - In Potchefstroom: Bermuda 187 (46.3 ov); United Arab Emirates 190/6 (47.1 ov). **United Arab Emirates win by 4 wickets**.
    - In Vanderbijlpark: Denmark 204/9 (50 ov); Afghanistan 205/5 (46.2 ov). **Afghanistan win by 5 wickets**.

==== Football (soccer) ====
- 2010 FIFA World Cup Qualifying:
  - UEFA (Europe):
    - Group 1:
      - Hungary 3–0 Malta
      - Denmark 3–0 Albania
        - Denmark and Hungary lead the group on 13 points.
    - Group 2:
      - Latvia 2–0 Luxembourg
      - Greece 2–1 Israel
        - Israel's unbeaten streak in World Cup Qualifying ends after 19 matches and 8 years.
      - Switzerland 2–0 Moldova
        - Greece and Switzerland lead the group on 13 points.
    - Group 3:
      - Czech Republic 1–2 Slovakia
      - Poland 10–0 San Marino
        - Poland score their biggest win in history.
      - Northern Ireland 1–0 Slovenia
        - Northern Ireland on top with 13 pts from 7 games, ahead of Slovakia on 12 points from 5 games.
    - Group 4:
      - Liechtenstein 0–1 Russia
      - Wales 0–2 Germany
        - Germany lead the group on 16 points, followed by Russia on 12 points.
    - Group 5:
      - Estonia 1–0 Armenia
      - Turkey 1–2 Spain
        - Albert Riera's goal in injury time gives Spain its sixth straight win in this campaign and extends its unbeaten streak to 31 games.
      - Bosnia and Herzegovina 2–1 Belgium
        - Spain on top with 18 points, followed by Bosnia on 12 points.
    - Group 6:
      - Kazakhstan 1–5 Belarus
      - Andorra 0–2 Croatia
      - England 2–1 Ukraine
        - John Terry's goal in the 85th minute maintains England's perfect record of 15 points from 5 matches, and keeps them 5 points clear of Croatia.
    - Group 7:
      - Austria 2–1 Romania
      - France 1–0 Lithuania
        - Franck Ribéry scores the winning goal for France, as he did in Kaunas on Saturday, and France goes to second place on 10 points, two behind Serbia.
    - Group 8:
      - Bulgaria 2–0 Cyprus
      - Georgia 0–0 Montenegro
      - Italy 1–1 Republic of Ireland
        - Robbie Keane's goal in the 86th minute gives Ireland a draw in Bari. Italy lead the group on 14 points, two points ahead of Ireland.
    - Group 9:
      - Netherlands 4–0 North Macedonia
      - Scotland 2–1 Iceland
        - The Dutch maintain their perfect record of 15 points in 5 games, and lead by 8 points over Scotland. A win over Iceland on June 6 will ensure the Oranje a trip to South Africa.
  - COMNEBOL (South America), matchday 12:
    - Bolivia 6–1 Argentina
      - Unfancied Bolivia hand Argentina its worst defeat since a similar loss to Czechoslovakia in 1958, and drop the Argentines to fourth place.
    - Ecuador 1–1 Paraguay
      - Edgar Benítez scores in injury time to give Paraguay a draw, and keep them on top of the standings with 24 points, 3 points ahead of Brazil.
    - Chile 0–0 Uruguay
      - Chile stay in third place, while Uruguay remain in playoff-bound fifth place.
    - Brazil 3–0 Peru
      - Brazil jump to second place, three points behind Paraguay.
      - Standings after 12 of 18 rounds: Paraguay 24 points, Brazil 21, Chile 20, Argentina 19, Uruguay 17, Colombia, Ecuador 14, Venezuela 13, Bolivia 12, Peru 7.
  - CONCACAF (North-Central America) Fourth round, matchday 3:
    - United States 3–0 Trinidad and Tobago
      - Jozy Altidore becomes the youngest American man with an international hat-trick, and Team USA stays atop the hexagonal with 7 points from three games.
    - Honduras 3–1 Mexico
      - Carlos Costly scores two goals and lifts Los Catrachos to third place on 4 points, ahead of Mexico with 3 points.
    - Costa Rica 1–0 El Salvador
      - Walter Centeno's goal in the 69th minute sends Los Ticos to second place in the group with 6 points, one point behind the USA.
  - AFC (Asia) fourth round, matchday 7:
    - Group A:
      - Australia 2–0 Uzbekistan
        - The Socceroos, with 13 points from 5 games, all but mathematically qualify to the final tournament.
      - Bahrain 1–0 Qatar
        - Bahrain remain in contention for outright qualification, with 7 points from 6 games, 4 points behind Japan that has a game in hand. However, Japan can book its place in South Africa on the next matchday with win in Uzbekistan, that is level with Qatar on 4 points, and both teams can only hope for 3rd place that leads to playoff series.
    - Group B:
      - South Korea 1–0 North Korea
        - Kim Chi-Woo's goal in the 88th minute gives South Korea a win over their neighbour and put them on top of the group with 11 points from 5 games. North Korea has 10 pts from 6 games in second place. Wins for both Korean teams on the next matchday will secure them at least a playoff berth.
      - Saudi Arabia 3–2 United Arab Emirates
        - Saudi Arabia's win put them level with North Korea on 10 points and eliminate UAE.
        - Iran, that is idle, trails North Korea and Saudi Arabia by 4 points, with a game in hand.
- Friendly internationals:
  - Iran 1–1 Senegal
  - Norway 3–2 Finland
  - Serbia 2–0 Sweden
