= Australian cricket team against Pakistan in the UAE in 2009 =

Men's cricket team tour

Australia against Pakistan in United Arab Emirates in 2009
	Pakistan	Australia
- Dates: 22 April 2009 – 7 May 2009
Captains	Younis Khan	Michael Clarke

One Day International series
- Results: Australia won the 5-match series 3–2
Most runs	Kamran Akmal (192)	Shane Watson (271)
Most wickets	Shahid Afridi (10)	Nathan Hauritz (8)
- Player of the series: Michael Clarke

Twenty20 International series
- Results: Pakistan won the 1-match series 1–0
Most runs	Kamran Akmal (59)	Shane Watson (33)
Most wickets	Umar Gul (4)	Nathan Hauritz (1)
- Player of the series: Shahid Afridi and Umar Gul

The Australian cricket team played Pakistan in a five-match One Day International series and one Twenty20 match starting from 22 April 2009 to 7 May 2009 in the United Arab Emirates. The series was named 'The Chapal Cup' and is the first game since 2002.

== Background ==
The Australia national cricket team was scheduled to tour Pakistan in March and April 2008, to play three Test matches and five One Day Internationals. The tour was cancelled by Australia due to concerns about the security of playing in the country. Following the 2008 general elections in Pakistan, there was continual violence, and some of the Australian players spoke about against travelling to compete in the series.

ODI series part was held in UAE as part of this tour, while the test series was held in England as part of Australian cricket team against Pakistan in England in 2010.

== Teams ==
ODI squads
Australia	Pakistan
Michael Clarke (c)	Younis Khan (c)
Doug Bollinger	Ahmed Shehzad
Nathan Bracken	Fawad Alam
Stuart Clark	Iftikhar Anjum
Callum Ferguson	Kamran Akmal (wk)
Brad Haddin (wk)	Misbah-ul-Haq
Nathan Hauritz	Nasir Jamshed
Ben Hilfenhaus	Saeed Ajmal
James Hopes	Salman Butt
David Hussey	Shahid Afridi
Ben Laughlin	Shoaib Akhtar
Shaun Marsh	Shoaib Malik
Andrew Symonds	Sohail Tanvir
Shane Watson	Umar Gul
	Yasir Arafat

- Australia originally chose Brett Geeves and Brett Lee in the squad but both were ruled out due to injury.

== ODI series ==
=== 1st ODI ===
22 April 2009
Scorecard

Australia; 168 (38.5 overs)	v	Pakistan; 171/6 (44.1 overs)
James Hopes 48* (46); Shahid Afridi 6/38 (10 overs)		Kamran Akmal 48 (62); James Hopes 2/22 (8 overs)

Pakistan won by 4 wickets
Dubai Sports City Cricket Stadium, Dubai
Umpires: Billy Bowden, Nadeem Ghauri
Player of the match: Shahid Afridi

- Australia won the toss and elected to bat.

=== 2nd ODI ===
24 April 2009
Scorecard

Pakistan; 207 (46.2 overs)	v	Australia; 208/4 (45.1 overs)
Salman Butt 57 (112); Nathan Hauritz 3/41 (10 overs)		Andrew Symonds 58 (62); Shahid Afridi 2/38 (10 overs)

Australia won by 6 wickets
Dubai Sports City Cricket Stadium, Dubai
Umpires: Billy Bowden, Asad Rauf
Player of the match: Andrew Symonds

- Pakistan won the toss and elected to bat.

=== 3rd ODI ===
27 April 2009
Scorecard

Australia; 198/7 (50 overs)	v	Pakistan; 171 (47.1 overs)
Michael Clarke 66 (93); Umar Gul 3/38 (8 overs)		Salman Butt 48 (77); Michael Clarke 3/15 (6 overs)

Australia won by 27 runs.
Sheikh Zayed Stadium, Abu Dhabi
Umpires: Billy Bowden, Asad Rauf
Player of the match: Michael Clarke

- Australia won the toss and elected to bat.

=== 4th ODI ===
1 May 2009
Scorecard

Pakistan; 197 (48.4 overs)	v	Australia; 200/2 (44.2 overs)
Ahmed Shehzad 43 (81); Doug Bollinger 5/35 (7.4 overs)		Michael Clarke 100* (122); Shoaib Akhtar 2/42 (7 overs)

Australia won by 8 wickets
Sheikh Zayed Stadium, Abu Dhabi
Umpires: Aleem Dar, Billy Bowden
Player of the match: DE Bollinger (Australia)

- Pakistan won the toss and elected to bat

=== 5th ODI ===
3 May 2009
Scorecard

Australia; 250/4 (50 overs)	v	Pakistan; 254/3 (47 overs)
Shane Watson 116* (146); Saeed Ajmal 1/40 (10 overs)		Kamran Akmal 116* (115); Nathan Hauritz 2/44 (10 overs)

Pakistan won by 7 wickets
Sheikh Zayed Stadium, Abu Dhabi
Umpires: Aleem Dar, Billy Bowden
Player of the match: Kamran Akmal

- Australia won the toss and elected to bat

== T20I match ==
7 May 2009
Scorecard

Australia; 108 (19.5 overs)	v	Pakistan; 109/3 (16.2 overs)
Shane Watson 33 (14); Umar Gul 4/8 (4 overs)		Kamran Akmal 59* (42); Nathan Hauritz 1/20 (3.2 overs)

Pakistan won by 7 wickets
Dubai Sports City Cricket Stadium, Dubai
Umpires: Aleem Dar (Pak) and Zameer Haider (Pak)
Player of the match: Shahid Afridi and Umar Gul

- Pakistan won the toss and elected to field.
