= Tuks Cricket Oval =

Cricket ground in Pretoria, South Africa

Coordinates: 25°45′03″S 28°14′50″E

- LC de Villiers Oval

Ground information
- Location: Pretoria, South Africa
- Establishment: 1993
- Capacity: 2,000
- Owner: University of Pretoria
- Architect: n/a
- Operator: Cricket South Africa
- Tenants: South Africa

International information
- First WODI: 24 March 2005: Australia v New Zealand
- Last WODI: 3 April 2003: South Africa v New Zealand
- Only WT20I: 15 May 2019: South Africa v Pakistan

Team information
Northerns	(1993–)
South Africa A	(1993–)
- As of 7 September 2020; Source: Cricinfo

Tuks Cricket Oval or LC de Villiers Oval is a cricket ground in Pretoria, South Africa. It is located in the premises of the Pretoria University. It is an occasional home ground for Northerns cricket team.

The university's High Performance Centre which was established in 2002 has become the favored location for the pre-departure camps of Team South Africa in addition to being chosen by several national and international federations as their preferred specialization centre.

Oval consist of 6 cricket fields, 3 Football fields, one rugby, two hockey field. Stadium is also shared with athletics. All field has floodlights with capacity of 2,000 persons. The oval hosted two Youth ODIs in 1998 ICC Under-19s World Cup and five women's ODIs in 2005 International Women's Cricket Council World Cup.

In 2013, Indian opening batsman Shikhar Dhawan scored unbeaten 248 run on this ground against South Africa A.

== Tournaments hosted ==
- 1998 ICC Under-19 Cricket World Cup
- 2005 Women's Cricket World Cup
- 2009 ICC World Cup Qualifier
