= Hämeenlinna Ice Hall =

Arena in Hämeenlinna, Finland

Coordinates: 60°59′42″N 24°25′55″E

Ritari-areena
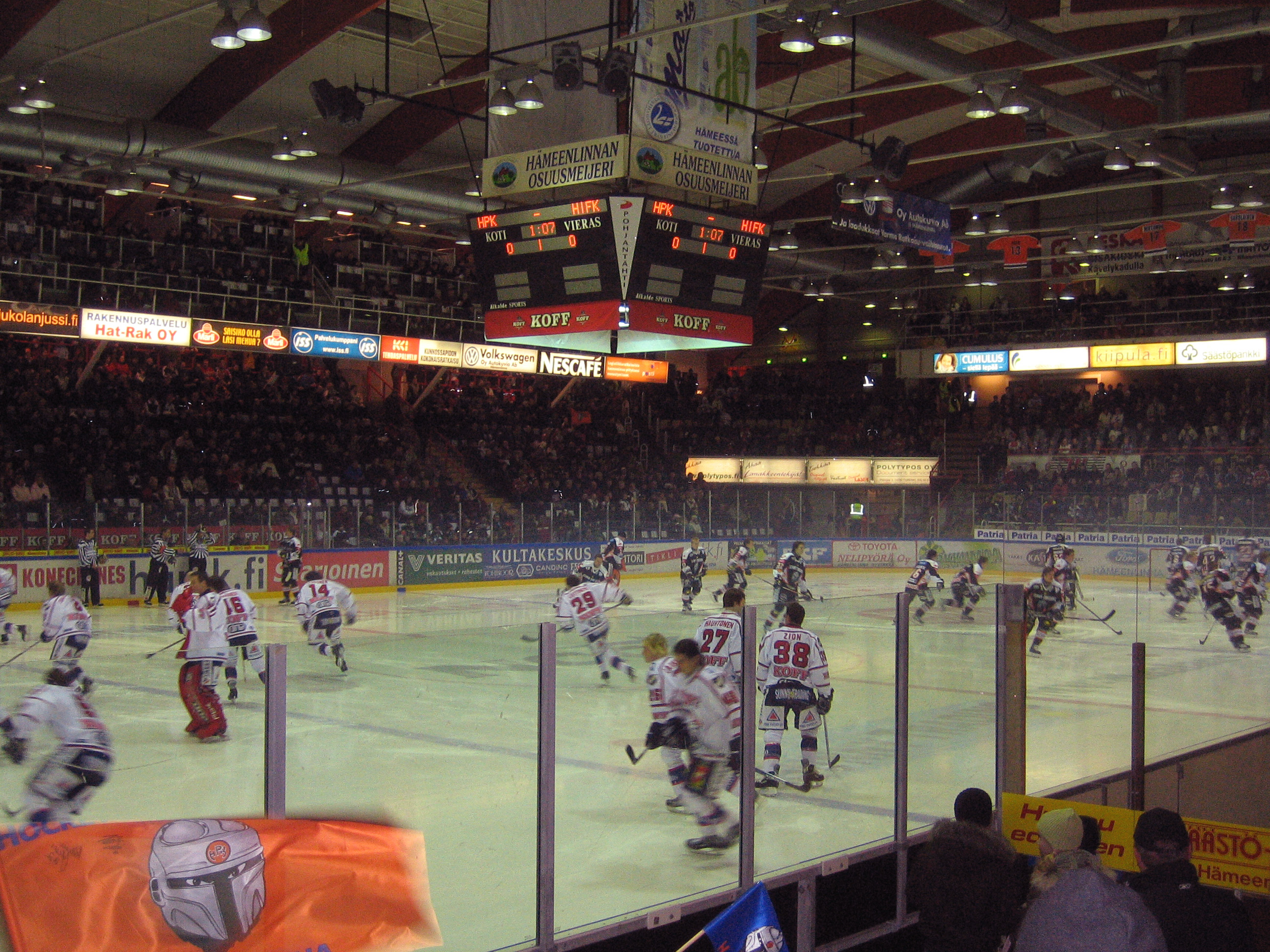
- HPK and HIFK players warm up before a SM-liiga game in March 2006.
- Interactive map of Ritari-areena
- Former names: Rinkelinmäen jäähalli, Hämeenlinnan jäähalli, Patria-areena
- Location: Rinkelinmäki, Hämeenlinna, Finland
- Operator: Hämeenlinnan Jäähalli Oy
- Capacity: 5,360

Construction
- Opened: 1979
- Renovated: 2008
- Expanded: 1996
- Architects: Heikki Aitola, Seppo and Petri Ilmarinen

Website
- www.hmlliikuntahallit.fi

Hämeenlinna Ice Hall (also known as Patria-areena, Rinkelinmäen jäähalli or Hämeenlinnan jäähalli or Ritari-areena) is an arena in Rinkelinmäki, Hämeenlinna, Finland. It is primarily used for ice hockey and is the home arena of the Liiga team HPK and the Auroraliiga team HPK Kiekkonaiset.

== History ==
In 1963, an artificial skating rink was built in Rinkelinmäki. A building was built over the rink after it switched over as city property in 1979. Since then, the building has been called an arena. The arena project started around 1976 because of pressure from HPK. This led to the formation of a committee that was led by HPK chairman, bank manager Seppo Nenonen. The committee made a property plan based on its research, knowing that the project's expenses needed to be in the minimum for it to succeed – and success still wasn't certain. All extra spaces had to be cut out: no break rooms and no concession areas. The most important thing was, that the building would be enclosed. The situation was poor. Today, some say that when people complain publicly about the current arena, the forget about the previous times.

The arena was planned by the city architectural department led by city architect Heikki Aitola. The planners of the subsequent extension phases have been mostly building architect Seppo Ilmarinen from the city architectural department and his son, architect Petri Ilmarinen. Hämeenlinnan Jäähalli Oy, the company managing the arena, was founded on February 3, 1992. In the same year, a practice arena was finished and in 1996, the main arena was expanded based on the new requirements by SM-liiga. These requirements stated, that a league arena must hold at least 5,000 people. At the same time, ownership of the arena was switched to the management company.

In 2002, a two-track ice exercise center was finished. As a tribute to ten years of the arena company, the arena was renamed as Ritarihalli. The arena was renovated again in 2008 to hold 5,360 spectators and also, merchandise and restaurant areas were refurbished. The arena was a venue for the 2009 Women's World Ice Hockey Championships, with matches being held both in the main and practice rinks.
