= June 2009 in sports =

<<	June 2009					>>
Su	Mo	Tu	We	Th	Fr	Sa
	1	2	3	4	5	6
7	8	9	10	11	12	13
14	15	16	17	18	19	20
21	22	23	24	25	26	27
28	29	30
Sports

This list shows notable sports-related deaths, events, and notable outcomes that occurred in June of 2009.

== Deaths in June ==
- 1: Vincent O'Brien
- 2: Tony Maggs
- 16: Peter Arundell

== Current sporting seasons ==
=== Australian rules football 2009 ===
- Australian Football League

=== Auto racing 2009 ===
- Formula One
- Sprint Cup
- IRL IndyCar Series
- World Rally Championship
- Formula Two
- Nationwide Series
- Camping World Truck Series
- GP2
- WTTC
- V8 Supercar
- American Le Mans
- Le Mans Series
- Superleague Formula
- Rolex Sports Car Series
- FIA GT Championship
- Formula Three
- World Series by Renault
- Deutsche Tourenwagen Masters
- Super GT

=== Baseball 2009 ===
- Major League Baseball
- Nippon Professional Baseball

=== Basketball 2009 ===
- American competitions:
  - WNBA
- Philippine competitions:
  - Professional:
    - Fiesta Conference – Playoffs
  - Collegiate
    - NCAA

=== Football (soccer) 2009 ===
National teams competitions

- 2010 FIFA World Cup Qualifying

International clubs competitions

- Copa Libertadores (South America)
- AFC (Asia) Champions League
- CAF (Africa) Champions League

Domestic (national) competitions

- Argentina
- Brazil
- Japan
- Norway
- Russia
- Major League Soccer (USA & Canada)
- Women's Professional Soccer (USA)

=== Golf 2009 ===
- European Tour
- PGA Tour
- LPGA Tour
- Champions Tour

=== Lacrosse 2009 ===
- Major League Lacrosse

=== Motorcycle racing 2009 ===
- Superbike World Championship
- Supersport racing

=== Rugby league 2009 ===
- Super League
- NRL

== Days of the month ==
=== June 30, 2009 (Tuesday) ===
==== Tennis ====
- Wimbledon Championships in London, day 8: (seeding in parentheses)
  - Ladies' singles, quarterfinals:
    - Dinara Safina (RUS) [1] def. Sabine Lisicki (GER) 6–7(5) 6–4 6–1
    - Serena Williams (USA) [2] def. Victoria Azarenka (BLR) [8] 6–2 6–3
    - Venus Williams (USA) [3] def. Agnieszka Radwańska (POL) [11] 6–1 6–2
    - Elena Dementieva (RUS) [4] def. Francesca Schiavone (ITA) 6–2 6–2

=== June 29, 2009 (Monday) ===
==== Football (soccer) ====
- European Under-21 Championship in Sweden:
  - Final:
    - England 0–4 **Germany**
      - Germany win the title for the first time.

==== Tennis ====
- Wimbledon Championships in London, day 7: (seeding in parentheses)
  - Gentlemen's singles, round of 16:
    - Roger Federer (SUI) [2] def. Robin Söderling (SWE) [13] 6–4, 7–6(5), 7–6(5)
    - Andy Murray (GBR) [3] def. Stanislas Wawrinka (SUI) [19] 2–6, 6–3, 6–3, 5–7, 6–3
    - Novak Djokovic (SRB) [4] def. Dudi Sela (ISR) 6–2, 6–4, 6–1
    - Andy Roddick (USA) [6] def. Tomáš Berdych (CZE) [20] 7–6(4), 6–4, 6–3
    - Ivo Karlović (CRO) [22] def. Fernando Verdasco (ESP) [7] 7–6(5), 6–7(4), 6–3, 7–6(9)
    - Juan Carlos Ferrero (ESP) def. Gilles Simon (FRA) [8] 7–6(4), 6–3, 6–2
    - Tommy Haas (GER) [24] def. Igor Andreev (RUS) [29] 7–6(8), 6–4, 6–4
    - Lleyton Hewitt (AUS) def. Radek Štěpánek (CZE) [23] 4–6, 2–6, 6–1, 6–2, 6–2
  - Ladies' singles, round of 16:
    - Dinara Safina (RUS) [1] def. Amélie Mauresmo (FRA) [17] 4–6, 6–3, 6–4
    - Serena Williams (USA) [2] def. Daniela Hantuchová (SVK) 6–3, 6–1
    - Venus Williams (USA) [3] def. Ana Ivanovic (SRB) [13] 6–1, 0–1 Ret.
    - Elena Dementieva (RUS) [4] def. Elena Vesnina (RUS) 6–1, 6–3
    - Victoria Azarenka (BLR) [8] def. Nadia Petrova (RUS) [10] 7–6(5), 2–6, 6–3
    - Sabine Lisicki (GER) def. Caroline Wozniacki (DEN) [9] 6–4, 6–4
    - Agnieszka Radwańska (POL) [11] def. Melanie Oudin (USA) 6–4, 7–5
    - Francesca Schiavone (ITA) def. Virginie Razzano (FRA) [26] 6–2, 7–6(1)

=== June 28, 2009 (Sunday) ===
==== Athletics ====
- US Track and Field Championships in Eugene, Oregon, day 4:
  - Women's 20 km walk: (gold) Teresa Vaill 1:37:12.84 (silver) Joanne Dow 1:39:59.32 (bronze) Maria Michta 1:41:16.24
  - Women's pole vault: (gold) Jennifer Stuczynski 4.65 m (silver) Chelsea Johnson 4.60 m (bronze) Stacy Dragila 4.55 m
  - Men's high jump: (gold) Tora Harris 2.31 m (silver) Andra Manson 2.28 m (silver) Keith Moffatt 2.28 m
  - Women's hammer: (gold) Jessica Cosby 72.04 m (silver) Amber Campbell 68.92 m (bronze) Erin Gilreath 68.08 m
  - Women's long jump: (gold) Brittney Reese 7.09 m (wind 3.1 m/s) (silver) Brianna Glenn 6.82 m (3.5) (bronze) Funmilayo Jimoh 6.77 m (1.3)
  - Men's shot put: (gold) Christian Cantwell 21.82 m (silver) Dan Taylor 21.21 m (bronze) Reese Hoffa 21.10 m
  - Men's 400 m hurdles: (gold) Bershawn Jackson 48.03 (silver) Johnny Dutch 48.18 (bronze) Angelo Taylor 48.30
  - Women's 3000 m steeplechase: (gold) Jennifer Barringer 9:29.38 (silver) Anna Willard 9:35.01 (bronze) Bridget Franek 9:36.74
  - Women's 800 m: (gold) Hazel Clark 2:00.79 (silver) Geena Gall 2:01.01 (bronze) Phoebe Wright 2:01.12
  - Men's 800 m: (gold) Nicholas Symmonds 1:45.86 (silver) Khadevis Robinson 1:45.97 (bronze) Ryan Brown 1:46.67
  - Women's heptathlon: (gold) Diana Pickler 6290 (silver) Sharon Day 6177 (bronze) Bettie Wade 5908
  - Women's 100 m hurdles (wind 2.2 m/s): (gold) Dawn Harper 12.36 (silver) Ginnie Powell 12.47 (bronze) Damu Cherry 12.58
  - Men's 1500 m: (gold) Lopez Lomong 3:41.68 (silver) Leonel Manzano 3:41.82 (bronze) Dorian Ulrey 3:42.84
  - Men's 200 m (wind 3.3 m/s): (gold) Shawn Crawford 19.73 (silver) Charles Clark 20.00 (bronze) Wallace Spearmon 20.03
  - Women's 200 m (wind 3.2 m/s): (gold) Allyson Felix 22.02 (silver) Muna Lee 22.13 (bronze) Marshevet Hooker 22.36
- Jamaican national championships in Kingston, day 3:
  - Men's 200 m (wind −2.4): (gold) Usain Bolt 20.25 (silver) Steve Mullings 20.40 (bronze) Marvin Anderson 20.63
  - Women's 200 m (wind −1.1): (gold) Veronica Campbell Brown 22.40 (silver) Shelly-Ann Fraser 22.58 (bronze) Simone Facey 22.96
  - Men's 400 m: (gold) Ricardo Chambers 45.55 (silver) Allodin Fothergill 45.57 (bronze) Lansford Spence 45.78
  - Women's 400 m: (gold) Novlene Williams-Mills 50.21 (silver) Shericka Williams 50.39 (bronze) Christine Day 51.54
  - Men's 110 m hurdles (wind −0.8): (gold) Maurice Wignall 13.48 (silver) Dwight Thomas 13.50 (bronze) Richard Phillips 13.61
  - Women's 100 m hurdles (wind −1.1): (gold) Delloreen Ennis-London 12.79 (silver) Brigitte Foster-Hylton 12.87 (bronze) Lacena Golding-Clarke 12.89
  - Men's 800 m: (gold) Aldwyn Sappleton 1:48.20 (silver) Ricardo Cunningham 1:48.21 (bronze) Andre Drummonds 1:50.49
  - Women's 800 m: (gold) Kenia Sinclair 2:01.63 (silver) Neisha Bernard-Thomas (GRN) 2:02.02 (bronze) Marian Burnett (GUY) 2:04.72

==== Auto racing ====
- Sprint Cup Series:
  - Lenox Industrial Tools 301 in Loudon, New Hampshire:
    - (1) (Connecticut) Joey Logano (Toyota, Joe Gibbs Racing) (2) (California) Jeff Gordon (Chevrolet, Hendrick Motorsports) (3) (Nevada) Kurt Busch (Dodge, Penske Championship Racing)
      - In a race called 28 laps early due to rain, Logano becomes the youngest driver to win in NASCAR's top series, at the age of 19 years, 35 days, breaking the record of Kyle Busch.
      - Drivers' standings (after 17 of 26 races leading to the Chase for the Sprint Cup): (1) (Indiana) Tony Stewart 2524 points (Chevrolet, Stewart Haas Racing) (2) Gordon 2455 (3) (California) Jimmie Johnson (Chevrolet, Hendrick Motorsports) 2355
- World Rally Championship:
  - Rally Poland:
    - (1) Mikko Hirvonen (FIN) (Ford Focus WRC) 3:07:27.5 (2) Dani Sordo (ESP) (Citroën C4 WRC) +1:10.3 (3) Henning Solberg (NOR) (Ford Focus WRC) +2:05.7
      - Drivers' standings (after 8 of 12 races): (1) Hirvonen 58 points (2) Sébastien Loeb (FRA) (Citroën C4 WRC) 57 (3) Sordo 39
      - Manufacturers' standings: (1) Citroën Total 106 points (2) BP Ford 89 (3) Stobart M-Sport 60

==== Baseball ====
- Major League Baseball:
  - New York Yankees closer Mariano Rivera becomes the second relief pitcher to earn his 500th career save as the Yankees defeat their crosstown rivals, the New York Mets, 4–2. Rivera joins Trevor Hoffman of the Milwaukee Brewers as the only closers with 500 or more saves.

==== Cricket ====
- India in West Indies:
  - 2nd ODI in Kingston, Jamaica:
    - India 188 (48.2 ov); West Indies 192/2 (34.1 ov). **West Indies win by 8 wickets, 4-match series level 1–1**.

==== Football (soccer) ====
- FIFA Confederations Cup in South Africa:
  - Third place: **Spain** 3–2 (a.e.t.) South Africa in Rustenburg
  - Final: Brazil 3–2 United States in Johannesburg
    - Brazil rally from 2 goals down to win the title for the third time.

==== Golf ====
- PGA Tour:
  - Travelers Championship in Cromwell, Connecticut:
    - Winner: Kenny Perry (USA) 258 (−22)
- European Tour:
  - BMW International Open in Munich, Germany:
    - Winner: Nick Dougherty (ENG) 266 (−22)
- LPGA Tour:
  - Wegmans LPGA in Pittsford, New York:
    - Winner: Jiyai Shin (KOR) 271 (−17)

==== Horse racing ====
- Irish Derby in County Kildare:
  - Winner: Fame and Glory (jockey: Johnny Murtagh, trainer: Aidan O'Brien)
    - O'Brien sets a record with his seventh winner in this race.

==== Motorcycle racing ====
- Superbike World Championship:
  - Donington Park Superbike World Championship round in North West Leicestershire, England:
    - Race 1: (1) Ben Spies (USA) (Yamaha YZF-R1) 34:57.230 (2) Max Biaggi (ITA) (Aprilia RSV 4) +7.156 (3) Noriyuki Haga (JPN) (Ducati 1098R) +10.968
    - Race 2: (1) Spies 35:14.788 (2) Leon Haslam (GBR) (Honda CBR1000RR) +6.622 (3) Michel Fabrizio (ITA) (Ducati 1098R) +6.816
  - Riders' standings (after 9 of 14 rounds): (1) Haga 308 points (2) Spies 294 (3) Fabrizio 257
  - Manufacturers' standings: (1) Ducati 383 points (2) Yamaha 337 (3) Honda 273

==== Volleyball ====
- FIVB World League:
  - Pool A:
    - Netherlands 0–3 Italy
      - USA lead the group with 14 points, ahead of Netherlands with 11.
  - Pool B:
    - France 3–2 South Korea
    - Serbia 3–0 Argentina
      - France lead the group with 11 points, followed by Serbia with 10.
  - Pool C:
    - Japan 0–3 Cuba
    - Russia 3–0 Bulgaria
      - Cuba lead the group with 15 points, followed by Russia with 12.
  - Pool D:
    - Poland 0–3 Brazil
      - Brazil lead the group with 17 points, ahead of Finland with 9.

=== June 27, 2009 (Saturday) ===
==== Athletics ====
- USA Outdoor Track and Field Championships in Eugene, Oregon, day 3:
  - Men:
    - 400 m: (gold) LaShawn Merritt 44.50, (silver) Gil Roberts 44.93, (bronze) Kerron Clement 45.14
    - 20 km race walk: (gold) Tim Seaman 1 h 26 min 14.26 s, (silver) Patrick Stroupe 1:26:41.44, (bronze) Benjamin Shorey 1:27:17.59
    - 110 m hurdles (wind 1.7 m/s): (gold) David Payne 13.12, (silver) Terrence Trammell 13.12, (bronze) Aries Merritt 13.15
    - 3,000 m steeplechase: (gold) Joshua McAdams 8:29.91, (silver) Daniel Huling 8:32.86, (bronze) Kyle Alcorn 8:34.65
    - Pole vault: (gold) Brad Walker 5.75 m, (silver) Jeremy Scott 5.75, (bronze) Derek Miles 5.75
    - Long jump: (gold) Dwight Phillips 8.57 m (2.2 m/s), (silver) Brian Johnson 8.26, (bronze) George Kitchens 8.23
    - Hammer: (gold) A. G. Kruger 75.31m, (silver) Jake Freeman 74.64, (bronze) Michael Mai 73.80
  - Women:
    - 400 m: (gold) Sanya Richards 50.05, (silver) Debbie Dunn 50.79, (bronze) Jessica Beard 50.81
    - 1,500 m: (gold) Shannon Rowbury 4:05.07, (silver) Christin Wurth 4:06.00, (bronze) Anna Willard 4:07.70
    - 400 m hurdles: (gold) Lashinda Demus 53.78, (silver) Sheena Tosta 54.45, (bronze) Tiffany Ross-Williams 55.18
    - Javelin: (gold) Kara Patterson 63.95m, (silver) Rachel Yurkovich 59.31, (bronze) Kim Kreiner 58.00
    - Heptathlon (after day 1): (1) Hyleas Fountain 4038 points (2) Diana Pickler 3768 (3) Sharon Day 3739
- Kenya national championships in Nairobi, day 3:
  - Men:
    - 100 m: (gold) Kipkemoi Soi (Armed Forces) 10.63, (silver) Tonny Chirchir (Armed Forces) 10.78, (bronze) Stephen Barasa (Prisons) 10.91.
    - 110 m hurdles: (gold) Amon Chepsongol (Armed Forces) 14.1, (silver) Kiprono Koskei (Police) 14.4, (bronze) Emmanuel Kimeu (Police) 14.7.
    - 200 m: (gold) Anderson Mureta (Police) 21.49, (silver) Kipkemoi Soi (Armed Forces) 21.63, (bronze) Stephen Barasa (Prisons) 21.91.
    - 400 m: (gold) Thomas Musembi (Kenya Prisons) 45.70, (silver) Mark Mutai (Armed Forces) 45.98, (bronze) Anderson Mureta (Police) 46.12.
    - 400 m hurdles: (gold) Kiprono Koskei (Police) 51.32, (silver) Amon Chepsongol (Armed Forces) 51.74, (bronze) Emmanuel Kimeu (Police) 51.77.
    - 800 m: (gold) David Rudisha (Police) 1:47.1, (silver) Jackson Kivuva (Armed Forces) 1:47.9, (bronze) Hoseah Kandie (Armed Forces) 1:48.5.
    - 1500 m: (gold) Gideon Gathimba (Armed Forces) 3:39.7, (silver) James Kangongo (Police) 3:41.2, (bronze) Churchill Kipsang (Nyanza South) 3:41.7.
    - 3000 m Steeplechase: (gold) Richard Matelong (Police) 8:14.2, (silver) Elijah Chelimo (Prisons) 8:19.8, (bronze) Abel Mutai (Armed Forces) 8:23.4
    - 5000 m: (gold) Joseph Kitur (Police) 13:47.0, (silver) Vincent Kiprop (Armed Forces) 13:48.2, (bronze) Alex Macharia (Police) 13:48.7
    - 10000 m: (gold) Sammy Kitwara (Police) 27:44.46, (silver) Gideon Ngatuny (Police) 27:44.77, (bronze) Bernard Kiprop Kipyego (Police) 27:44.80
  - Women:
    - 100 m: (gold) Maryline Chelangat (Police) 12.54, (silver) Pamela Masambule (Police) 12.56, (bronze) Gladys Thiongo (Armed Forces) 12.58.
    - 100 m hurdles: (gold) Florence Wasike (Prisons) 14.5, (silver) Ruth Kemunto (Kenya Police) 15.4, (bronze) Maureen Jelagat (Prisons) 15.6.
    - 200 m: (gold) Joy Sakari (Police) 23.84, (silver) Maryline Chelangat (Police) 25.00, (bronze) Zipporah Ratemo (Prisons) 25.39.
    - 400 m: (gold) Joy Sakari (Police) 53.06, (silver) Betty Chelangat (South Rift) 54.96, (bronze) Zipporah Ratemo (Prisons) 55.46.
    - 400 m hurdles: (gold) Florence Wasike (Prisons) 58.42, (silver) Callen Nyakawa (Police) 58.75, (bronze) Ruth Kemunto (Police) 61.22.
    - 800 m: (gold) Winny Chebet (South Rift) 2:05.9, (silver) Jane Jelagat (Armed Forces) 2:06.3, (bronze) Nelly Jeptanui (Armed Forces) 2:08.6.
    - 1500 m: (gold) Vivian Cheruiyot (Police) 4:07.66, (silver) Sylvia Kibet (Police) 4:08.57, (bronze) Innes Chenonge (Armed Forces) 4:08.61.
    - 3000 m steeplechase: (gold) Gladys Kemboi (North Rift) 9:40.47, (silver) Milka Chemos (Police) 9:41.00, (bronze) Lydia Rotich (Police) 9:41.13.
    - 5000 m: (gold) Mercy Cherono (South Rift) 15:46.74, (silver) Pascalia Chepkorir (Police) 15:57.05, (bronze) Naomi Chepgnetich (Coast) 15:58.84.
- Jamaican national championships in Kingston, day 2:
  - Men's 100 m: (gold) Usain Bolt 9.86, (silver) Asafa Powell 9.97, (bronze) Michael Frater 10.02
  - Women's 100 m: (gold) Shelly-Ann Fraser 10.88, (silver) Kerron Stewart 10.93, (bronze) Sheri Ann Brooks 11.16
  - Men's 400 m hurdles: (gold) Isa Phillips 48.05, (silver) Danny McFarlane 48.54 (bronze) Josef Robertson 49.22
  - Women's 400 m hurdles: (gold) Melaine Walker 54.70, (silver) Kaliese Spencer 54.71, (bronze) Nickiesha Wilson 56.01
  - Women's triple jump: (gold) Trecia-Kaye Smith 14.43m, (silver) Kimberly Williams 14.04m, (bronze) Megan Reid 12.82m

==== Auto racing ====
- IndyCar Series:
  - SunTrust Indy Challenge in Richmond, Virginia:
    - (1) Scott Dixon (NZL) (Chip Ganassi Racing) (2) Dario Franchitti (GBR) (Chip Ganassi Racing) (3) Graham Rahal (USA) (Newman/Haas/Lanigan Racing)
      - Drivers' standings (after 8 of 17 races): (1) Franchitti 279 points (2) Dixon 278 (3) Ryan Briscoe (AUS) (Team Penske) 253
- Nationwide Series:
  - Camping World 200 in Loudon, New Hampshire:
    - (1) (Nevada) Kyle Busch (Toyota, Joe Gibbs Racing) (2) (Connecticut) Joey Logano (Toyota, Joe Gibbs Racing) (3) (Michigan) Brad Keselowski (Chevrolet, JR Motorsports)

==== Motorcycle racing ====
- Moto GP:
  - Dutch TT in Assen, Netherlands:
    - (1) Valentino Rossi (ITA) (Yamaha) (2) Jorge Lorenzo (ESP) (Yamaha) (3) Casey Stoner (AUS) (Ducati)
      - Rossi wins the 100th race of his career.
    - Riders' standing (after 7 of 17 races): (1) Rossi 131 points (2) Lorenzo 126 (3) Stoner 122
    - Manufacturers' standings: (1) Yamaha 175 points (2) Ducati 122 (3) Honda 85

==== Rugby union ====
- Mid-year test series:
  - Australia 22–6 France in Sydney
  - New Zealand 27–6 Italy in Christchurch
- Lions tour of South Africa:
  - Second Test: South Africa 28–25 British & Irish Lions in Pretoria
    - A penalty at the final horn by Morné Steyn gives the Springboks an insurmountable 2–0 lead in the Test series.

==== Tennis ====
- Wimbledon Championships in London, day 6: (seeding in parentheses)
  - Gentlemen's singles, third round:
    - Andy Murray (GBR) [3] bt Viktor Troicki (SRB) [30] 6–2, 6–3, 6–4
    - Andy Roddick (USA) [6] bt Jürgen Melzer (AUT) [26] 7–6 (2), 7–6 (2), 4–6, 6–3
    - Gilles Simon (FRA) [8] bt Victor Hănescu (ROU) [31] 6–2, 7–5, 6–2
    - Juan Carlos Ferrero (ESP) bt Fernando González (CHI) [10] 4–6, 7–5, 6–4, 4–6, 6–4
  - Ladies' singles, third round:
    - Dinara Safina (RUS) [1] bt Kirsten Flipkens (BEL) 7–5, 6–1
    - Venus Williams (USA) [3] bt Carla Suárez Navarro (ESP) 6–0, 6–4
    - Sabine Lisicki (GER) bt Svetlana Kuznetsova (RUS) [5] 6–2, 7–5
    - Melanie Oudin (USA) bt Jelena Janković (SRB) [6] 6–7 (8/10), 7–5, 6–2
    - Caroline Wozniacki (DEN) [9] bt Anabel Medina Garrigues (ESP) [20] 6–2, 6–2

==== Volleyball ====
- FIVB World League:
  - Pool A:
    - Netherlands 2–3 Italy
    - United States 3–0 China
      - USA lead the group with 14 points from 6 matches, followed by Netherlands with 11 points from 5 matches.
  - Pool C:
    - Japan 0–3 Cuba
    - Russia 1–3 Bulgaria
      - Cuba lead the group with 12 points, ahead of Russia with 9.
  - Pool D:
    - Poland 0–3 Brazil
    - Finland 3–0 Venezuela
      - Brazil lead the group with 14 points from 5 matches, ahead of Finland with 9 from 6.

=== June 26, 2009 (Friday) ===
==== Athletics ====
- U.S. Track and Field Championships in Eugene, Oregon, day 2:
  - Women's triple jump: (gold) Shakeema Welsch 14.30 m, (silver) Erica McLain 13.91, (bronze) Toni Smith 13.90
  - Women's shot put: (gold) Michelle Carter 18.03m, (silver) Jillian Camarena 17.94, (bronze) Kristin Heaston 17.88
  - Men's decathlon: (gold) Trey Hardee 8,261 pts, (silver) Ashton Eaton 8,075, (bronze) Jake Arnold 7,984
  - Men's discus: (gold) Casey Malone 64.99 m, (silver) Jarred Rome 63.48, (bronze) Ian Waltz 61.91
  - Women's 10 (wind 3.3 m/s): (gold) Carmelita Jeter 10.78 (10.776), (silver) Muna Lee 10.78 (10.777), (bronze) Lauryn Williams 10.96
  - Men's 100 m (wind 3.1 m/s): (gold) Michael Rodgers 9.91 s, (silver) Darvis Patton 9.92, (bronze) Monzavous Edwards 10.00
  - Women's 5000 m: (gold) Kara Goucher 15:20.94, (silver) Jennifer Rhines 15:26.92, (bronze) Angela Bizzarri 15:33.02
  - Men's 5000 m: (gold) Matt Tegenkamp 13:20.57, (silver) Chris Solinsky 13:20.82, (bronze) Evan Jager 13:22.18
- Kenya national championships in Nairobi, day 2:
  - Women's 10000 m: (gold) Linet Masai (Kenya Police) 32:49.3, (silver) Lineth Chepkurui (Armed Forces) 32:57.3, (bronze) Philes Ongori (Nyanza South) 33:04.1

==== Cricket ====
- India in West Indies:
  - 1st ODI in Kingston, Jamaica:
    - India 339/6 (50 ov, Yuvraj Singh 131); West Indies 319 (48.1 ov). **India win by 20 runs, lead 4-match series 1–0**.

==== Football (soccer) ====
- European Under-21 Championship in Sweden:
  - Semifinals:
    - **England** 3–3 (5–4 pen.) Sweden
    - Italy 0–1 **Germany**

==== Ice hockey ====
- 2009 NHL entry draft in Montreal:
  - Round 1: (1) John Tavares (CAN) (New York Islanders) (2) Victor Hedman (SWE) (Tampa Bay Lightning) (3) Matt Duchene (CAN) (Colorado Avalanche)

==== Tennis ====
- Wimbledon Championships in London, day 5: (seeding in parentheses)
  - Gentlemen's singles, third round:
    - Roger Federer (SUI) [2] bt Philipp Kohlschreiber (GER) [27] 6–3, 6–2, 6–7(5), 6–1
    - Novak Djokovic (SRB) [4] bt Mardy Fish (USA) [28] 6–4, 6–4, 6–4
    - Fernando Verdasco (ESP) [7] bt Albert Montañés (ESP) [32] 4–6, 6–1, 6–4, 7–6(2)
    - Ivo Karlović (CRO) [22] bt Jo-Wilfried Tsonga (FRA) [9] 7–6(5), 6–7(5), 7–5, 7–6(5)
  - Ladies' singles, third round:
    - Serena Williams (USA) [2] bt Roberta Vinci (ITA) 6–3, 6–4
    - Elena Dementieva (RUS) [4] bt Regina Kulikova (RUS) 6–1, 6–2
    - Virginie Razzano (FRA) [26] bt Vera Zvonareva (RUS) [7] walkover
    - Victoria Azarenka (BLR) [8] bt Sorana Cîrstea (ROU) [28] 7–6(2), 6–3
    - Nadia Petrova (RUS) [10] bt Gisela Dulko (ARG) 3–6, 6–3, 6–4

==== Volleyball ====
- FIVB World League:
  - Pool A:
    - United States 3–0 China
  - Pool B:
    - Serbia 2–3 Argentina
    - France 3–1 South Korea
  - Pool D:
    - Finland 3–2 Venezuela

=== June 25, 2009 (Thursday) ===
==== Athletics ====
- U.S. Track and Field Championships in Eugene, Oregon, day 1:
  - Men's javelin: (gold) Chris Hill 83.87m, (silver) Mike Hazle 82.06, (bronze) Sean Furey 76.16
  - Women's high jump: (gold) Chaunte Howard 1.95m, (silver) Amy Acuff 1.95, (bronze) Sharon Day 1.95
  - Men's triple jump: (gold) Brandon Roulhac 17.44m, (silver) Walter Davis 16.84, (bronze) James Jenkins 16.79
  - Women's discus: (gold) Stephanie Brown Trafton 64.25m, (silver) Aretha Thurmond 62.51, (bronze) Rebecca Breisch 62.08
  - Women's 10000 m: (gold) Amy Begley 31:22.69, (silver) Shalane Flanagan 31:23.43, (bronze) Katie McGregor 32:08.04
  - Men's 10000 m: (gold) Galen Rupp 27:52.53, (silver) Dathan Ritzenhein 27:58.59, (bronze) Tim Nelson 28:01.43
  - Men's decathlon (standing after day 1): (1) Trey Hardee 4,337 pts, (2) Ashton Eaton 4,333, (3) Desi Burt 4,046

==== Basketball ====
- Bundesliga Playoffs Final:
  - Game 5: EWE Baskets Oldenburg 71–70 Telekom Baskets Bonn. **Oldenburg win series 3–2.**
- 2009 NBA draft in New York City: (1) Blake Griffin selected by Los Angeles Clippers (2) Hasheem Thabeet selected by Memphis Grizzlies (3) James Harden selected by Oklahoma City Thunder

==== Football (soccer) ====
- FIFA Confederations Cup in South Africa:
  - Semifinals: **Brazil** 1–0 South Africa in Johannesburg
- Copa Libertadores Semifinals, first leg:
  - Estudiantes (Argentina) 1–0 (Uruguay) Nacional

==== Tennis ====
- Wimbledon Championships in London, day 4: (seeding in parentheses)
  - Gentlemen's singles, second round:
    - Andy Murray (GBR) [3] bt Ernests Gulbis (LAT) 6–2, 7–5, 6–3
    - Lleyton Hewitt (AUS) bt Juan Martín del Potro (ARG) [5] 6–3, 7–5, 7–5
    - Andy Roddick (USA) [6] bt Igor Kunitsyn (RUS) 6–4, 6–2, 3–6, 6–2
    - Gilles Simon (FRA) [8] bt Thiago Alves (BRA) 5–7, 6–3, 6–4, 6–4
    - Fernando González (CHI) [10] bt Leonardo Mayer (ARG) 6–7 (4), 6–4, 6–4, 6–4
  - Ladies' singles, second round:
    - Dinara Safina (RUS) [1] bt Rossana de los Ríos (PAR) 6–3, 7–5
    - Venus Williams (USA) [3] bt Kateryna Bondarenko (UKR) 6–3, 6–2
    - Svetlana Kuznetsova (RUS) [5] bt Pauline Parmentier (FRA) 6–1, 6–3
    - Jelena Janković (SRB) [6] bt Iveta Benešová (CZE) 6–2, 6–4
    - Caroline Wozniacki (DEN) [9] bt Maria Kirilenko (RUS) 6–0, 6–4

=== June 24, 2009 (Wednesday) ===
==== Baseball ====
- College World Series in Omaha:
  - Finals, Game 3: LSU 11, Texas 4. **LSU wins series 2–1.**

==== Football (soccer) ====
- FIFA Confederations Cup in South Africa:
  - Semifinals: Spain 0–2 **United States** in Bloemfontein
    - The United States end Spain's winning streak at 15 matches and their unbeaten streak at 35, and advance to the final of a FIFA men's competition for the first time ever.
- Copa Libertadores Semifinals, first leg:
  - Cruzeiro (Brazil) 3–1 (Brazil) Grêmio
- AFC Champions League Round of 16, East Asia:
  - **Nagoya Grampus** (Japan) 2–1 (South Korea) Suwon Bluewings
  - Gamba Osaka (Japan) 2–3 (Japan) **Kawasaki Frontale**
  - Kashima Antlers (Japan) 2–2 (South Korea) **FC Seoul**
    - Seoul win 5–4 in penalty shootout
  - **Pohang Steelers** (South Korea) 6–0 (Australia) Newcastle United Jets

==== Rugby league ====
- State of Origin Series:
  - Game 2 in Sydney: New South Wales 14–24 Queensland. **Queensland take an insurmountable 2–0 series lead.**
    - Queensland become the first team to win four consecutive State of Origin series since the current three-match format was instituted in 1982.

==== Tennis ====
- Wimbledon Championships in London, day 3: (seeding in parentheses)
  - Gentlemen's singles, second round:
    - Roger Federer (SUI) [2] bt Guillermo García López (ESP) 6–2, 6–2, 6–4
    - Novak Djokovic (SRB) [4] bt Simon Greul (GER) 7–5, 6–1, 6–4
    - Fernando Verdasco (ESP) [7] bt Kristof Vliegen (BEL) 7–6 (3), 6–7 (3), 7–6 (4), 6–4
    - Jo-Wilfried Tsonga (FRA) [9] bt Simone Bolelli (ITA) walkover
  - Ladies' singles, second round:
    - Serena Williams (USA) [2] bt Jarmila Groth (AUS) 6–2, 6–1
    - Elena Dementieva (RUS) [4] bt Aravane Rezaï (FRA) 6–1, 6–3
    - Vera Zvonareva (RUS) [7] bt Mathilde Johansson (FRA) 6–1, 6–3
    - Victoria Azarenka (BLR) [8] bt Ioana Raluca Olaru (ROU) 6–0, 6–0
    - Nadia Petrova (RUS) [10] bt Shahar Pe'er (ISR) 6–3, 6–2

=== June 23, 2009 (Tuesday) ===
==== Baseball ====
- College World Series in Omaha:
  - Finals Game 2: Texas 5, LSU 1. **Series tied 1–1.**

==== Basketball ====
- Bundesliga Playoffs Final:
  - Game 4: Telekom Baskets Bonn 66–82 EWE Baskets Oldenburg. **Series tied 2–2.**

==== Football (soccer) ====
- European Under-21 Championship in Sweden: (teams in **bold** advance to the semifinals)
  - Group A:
    - Serbia 1–3 **Sweden**
    - Belarus 1–2 **Italy**
      - Standings: Italy 7 points, Sweden 6, Serbia 2, Belarus 1.

==== Ice hockey ====
- The Hockey Hall of Fame announces its 2009 class of inductees, who will enter the Hall in November:
  - Players: Brett Hull, Brian Leetch, Luc Robitaille, Steve Yzerman
  - Builders: Lou Lamoriello

==== Rugby union ====
- Lions tour of South Africa:
  - Emerging Springboks (South Africa) 13–13 British & Irish Lions in Cape Town

==== Shooting ====
- ISSF World Cup in San Marino, San Marino: (Qualification scores in parentheses)
  - Men's trap: (gold) Ryan Hadden (USA) 144+3 (121) (silver) David Kostelecký (CZE) 144+2 (121) (bronze) Sergio Piñero (DOM) 143 (121)

==== Tennis ====
- Wimbledon Championships in London, day 2: (seeding in parentheses)
  - Gentlemen's singles, first round:
    - Andy Murray (GBR) (3) bt Robert Kendrick (USA) 7–5, 6–7 (3/7), 6–3, 6–4
    - Juan Martín del Potro (ARG) (5) bt Arnaud Clément (FRA) 6–3, 6–1, 6–2
    - Andy Roddick (USA) (6) bt Jérémy Chardy (FRA) 6–3, 7–6 (7/3), 4–6, 6–3
    - Gilles Simon (FRA) (8) bt Bobby Reynolds (USA) 6–4, 6–3, 6–3
    - Fernando González (CHI) (10) bt Teymuraz Gabashvili (RUS) 7–5, 7–5, 6–3
  - Ladies' singles, first round:
    - Dinara Safina (RUS) (1) bt Lourdes Domínguez Lino (ESP) 7–5, 6–3
    - Venus Williams (USA) (3) bt Stefanie Vögele (SUI) 6–3, 6–2
    - Svetlana Kuznetsova (RUS) (5) bt Akiko Morigami (JPN) 6–3, 7–6(1)
    - Jelena Janković (SRB) (6) bt Julia Görges (GER) 6–4, 7–6(0)
    - Vera Zvonareva (RUS) (7) bt Georgie Stoop (GBR) To Finish 7–6(0), 4–6, 6–4
    - Caroline Wozniacki (DEN) (9) bt Kimiko Date-Krumm (JPN) 5–7, 6–3, 6–1

=== June 22, 2009 (Monday) ===
==== Baseball ====
- College World Series in Omaha:
  - Finals Game 1: LSU 7, Texas 6 (11 innings). **LSU leads series 1–0.**
- Major League Baseball:
  - MLB players' union executive director Donald Fehr announces he will step down from his position, and the union's legal counsel Michael Weiner will replace him. (ESPN)

==== Football (soccer) ====
- European Under-21 Championship in Sweden: (teams in **bold** advance to the semifinals)
  - Group B:
    - Finland 0–2 Spain
    - **Germany** 1–1 **England**
      - Standings: England 7 points, Germany 5, Spain 4, Finland 0.
- UEFA Regions' Cup final in Zaprešić, Croatia:
  - Oltenia (Romania) 1–2 (Spain) **Castile and León**

==== Golf ====
- Men's majors:
  - U.S. Open in Farmingdale, New York:
    - Final results: (1) Lucas Glover (USA) 276 (−4) (2) Ricky Barnes, David Duval, and Phil Mickelson (all United States) 278 (−2)

==== Shooting ====
- ISSF World Cup in San Marino, San Marino: (Qualification scores in parentheses)
  - Women's trap: (gold) Daina Gudzinevičiūtė (LTU) 88 (68) (silver) Alessandra Perilli (SMR) 87+6 (70) (bronze) Lu Xingyu (CHN) 87+5 (68)

==== Tennis ====
- Wimbledon Championships in London, day 1: (seeding in parentheses)
  - Gentlemen's singles, first round:
    - Roger Federer (SUI) (2) bt Lu Yen-hsun (TPE) 7–5, 6–3, 6–2
    - Novak Djokovic (SRB) (4) bt Julien Benneteau (FRA) 6–7 (8), 7–6 (1), 6–2, 6–4
    - Fernando Verdasco (ESP) (7) bt James Ward (GBR) 6–1, 6–3, 6–4
    - Jo-Wilfried Tsonga (FRA) (9) bt Andrey Golubev (KAZ) 6–3, 5–7, 7–6 (4), 7–6 (5)
  - Ladies' singles, first round:
    - Serena Williams (USA) (2) bt Neuza Silva (POR) 6–1, 7–5
    - Elena Dementieva (RUS) (4) bt Alla Kudryavtseva (RUS) 6–4, 6–1
    - Vera Zvonareva (RUS) (7) vs Georgie Stoop (GBR) 7–6(0) 4–6 (suspended)
    - Victoria Azarenka (BLR) (8) bt Séverine Brémond (FRA) 6–2 – retired
    - Nadia Petrova (RUS) (10) bt Anastasiya Yakimova (BLR) 6–1, 6–1

=== June 21, 2009 (Sunday) ===
==== Athletics ====
- European Team Championships in Leiria, Portugal, day 2:
  - Final standings: (gold) Germany 326.5 points (silver) Russia 320 (bronze) Great Britain 303

==== Auto racing ====
- Formula One:
  - British Grand Prix in Northamptonshire and Buckinghamshire, United Kingdom:
    - (1) Sebastian Vettel (GER) (Red Bull–Renault) 1:22:49 (2) Mark Webber (AUS) (Red Bull-Renault) +15.2 (3) Rubens Barrichello (BRA) (Brawn–Mercedes) +41.2
      - Drivers' standings (after 8 of 17 races): (1) Jenson Button (GBR) (Brawn-Mercedes) 64 points (2) Barrichello 41 (3) Vettel 39
      - Constructors' standings: (1) Brawn-Mercedes 105 points (2) Red Bull-Renault 74.5 (3) Toyota 34.5
- Sprint Cup Series:
  - Toyota/Save Mart 350 in Sonoma, California:
    - (1) (Washington (state)) Kasey Kahne (Dodge, Richard Petty Motorsports) (2) (Indiana) Tony Stewart (Chevrolet, Stewart Haas Racing) (3) (Australia) Marcos Ambrose (Toyota, JTG Daugherty Racing)
      - Drivers' standings (after 16 of 26 races leading to the Chase for the Sprint Cup): (1) Stewart 2364 points (2) (California) Jeff Gordon (Chevrolet, Hendrick Motorsports) 2280 (3) (California) Jimmie Johnson (Chevrolet, Hendrick Motorsports) 2207
- IndyCar Series:
  - Iowa Corn Indy 250 in Newton, Iowa:
    - (1) Dario Franchitti (GBR) (Chip Ganassi Racing) (2) Ryan Briscoe (AUS) (Team Penske) (3) Hideki Mutoh (JPN) (Andretti Green Racing)
      - Drivers' standings (after 7 of 17 races): (1) Briscoe 241 points (2) Franchitti 238 (3) Scott Dixon (NZL) (Chip Ganassi Racing) 226
- World Touring Car Championship:
  - Race of the Czech Republic in Brno, Czech Republic:
    - Race 1: (1) Alessandro Zanardi (ITA) (BMW 320si) (2) Jörg Müller (GER) (BMW 320si) (3) Gabriele Tarquini (ITA) (SEAT León 2.0 TDI)
    - Race 2: (1) Sergio Hernández (ESP) (BMW 320si) (2) Yvan Muller (FRA) (SEAT León 2.0 TDI) (3) Tiago Monteiro (POR) (SEAT León 2.0 TDI)
      - Standings (after 12 of 24 races): (1) Yvan Muller 66 points (2) Tarquini 56 (3) Augusto Farfus (BRA) (BMW 320si) 54
- FIA GT Championship:
  - Oschersleben 2 Hours in Oschersleben, Germany
    - (1) Anthony Kumpen (BEL) & Mike Hezemans (NLD) (Chevrolet Corvette C6.R) (2) Michael Bartels (GER) & Andrea Bertolini (ITA) (Maserati MC12 GT1) (3) Miguel Ramos (POR) & Alex Müller (GER) (Maserati MC12 GT1)
      - Standings (after 3 of 8 races): (1) Bartels & Bertolini 26 points (3) Hezemans & Kumpen 23
- V8 Supercars:
  - Skycity Triple Crown in Darwin, Northern Territory:
    - Round 10: (1) Michael Caruso (AUS) (Holden Commodore) (2) Alex Davison (AUS) (Ford Falcon) (3) Craig Lowndes (AUS) (Ford Falcon)
      - Standings (after 10 of 26 races): (1) Jamie Whincup (AUS) (Ford Falcon) 1272 points (2) Will Davison (AUS) (Holden Commodore) 1128 (3) Garth Tander (AUS) (Holden Commodore) 954

==== Badminton ====
- BWF Super Series:
  - Indonesia Super Series:
    - Men's singles final: Lee Chong Wei (MAS) bt Taufik Hidayat (INA) 21–9, 21–14
    - Men's doubles final: Jung Jae-sung/Lee Yong-dae (KOR) bt Cai Yun/Fu Haifeng (CHN) 21–15, 21–18
    - Women's singles final: Saina Nehwal (IND) bt Wang Lin (CHN) 12–21, 21–18, 21–9
    - Women's doubles final: Chin Eei Hui/Wong Pei Tty (MAS) bt Cheng Shu/Zhao Yunlie (CHN) 21–16, 21–16
    - Mixed doubles final: Zheng Bo/Ma Jin (CHN) bt Lee Yong-dae/Lee Hyo-jung (KOR) 21–17, 8–21, 21–16

==== Baseball ====
- Major League Baseball:
  - St. Louis Cardinals manager Tony La Russa won his 2,500th game as a baseball skipper as the Cardinals defeated the Kansas City Royals at Kaufmann Stadium, 12–5.

==== Basketball ====
- Bundesliga Playoffs Final:
  - Game 3: EWE Baskets Oldenburg 78–81 Telekom Baskets Bonn. **Bonn lead series 2–1**.

==== Cricket ====
- ICC World Twenty20 in England:
  - Final: Sri Lanka 138/6 (20/20 ov, Kumar Sangakkara 64*); Pakistan 139/2 (18.4/20 ov, Shahid Afridi 54*) at Lord's, London. **Pakistan win by 8 wickets**.
- ICC Women's World Twenty20 in England
  - Final: New Zealand 85 (20/20 ov); England 86/4 (17/20 ov) at Lord's, London. **England win by 6 wickets**.

==== Cycling ====
- UCI ProTour:
  - Tour de Suisse:
    - Stage 9 (ITT): (1) Fabian Cancellara (SUI) (Team Saxo Bank) 45' 59" (2) Tony Martin (GER) (Team Columbia–High Road) + 1' 27" (3) Thomas Dekker (NED) (Silence–Lotto) + 1' 42"
      - Final general classification: (1) Cancellara (2) Martin + 2' 02" (3) Roman Kreuziger (CZE) (Liquigas) + 2' 24"

==== Football (soccer) ====
- FIFA Confederations Cup in South Africa: (teams in **bold** advance to the semifinals)
  - Group B:
    - Italy 0–3 **Brazil** in Pretoria
    - Egypt 0–3 **United States** in Rustenburg
      - Standings: Brazil 9 points, USA 3 (goals 4–6), Italy 3 (3–5), Egypt 3 (4–7).
- 2010 FIFA World Cup Qualifying:
  - 2010 FIFA World Cup qualification (CAF) Third round, matchday 3:
    - Group D:
      - Mali 3–1 Benin
    - Group E:
      - Guinea 2–1 Malawi
- Argentine Primera División – Clausura, matchday 18 of 19:
  - (2) Huracán 3–0 (19) Arsenal
  - (3) Lanús 1–1 (1) Vélez Sarsfield
    - Standings: Huracán 38 points, Vélez Sársfield 37, Lanús 35.
    - Vélez Sársfield will host Huracán in the final round on July 5.

==== Golf ====
- Men's majors:
  - U.S. Open in Farmingdale, New York:
    - Leaders after third round: (1) Ricky Barnes (USA) 202 (−8) (2) Lucas Glover (USA) 203 (−7) (3) David Duval (USA) & Ross Fisher (ENG) 207 (−3)
    - Standings at close of play: Glover & Barnes −7, Phil Mickelson (USA), Hunter Mahan (USA), Duval & Fisher −2
- European Tour:
  - Saint-Omer Open in Saint-Omer, France :
    - (1) Christian Nilsson (SWE) 271 (−13)
      - Nilsson wins his first European Tour title.

==== Motorcycle racing ====
- Superbike World Championship:
  - Misano Superbike World Championship round in Misano Adriatico, Italy:
    - Race 1: (1) Ben Spies (USA) (Yamaha YZF-R1) (2) Shane Byrne (UK) (Ducati 1098R) (3) Michel Fabrizio (ITA) (Ducati 1098R)
    - Race 2: (1) Jonathan Rea (UK) (Honda CBR1000RR) (2) Fabrizio (3) Noriyuki Haga (JPN) (Ducati 1098R)
      - Riders' standings after 8 of 14 rounds: (1) Haga 292 points (2) Spies 244 (3) Fabrizio 237

==== Volleyball ====
- FIVB World League:
  - Pool A:
    - Netherlands 3–0 China
    - Italy 1–3 United States
      - Netherlands lead the group with 10 points, followed by USA with 8.
  - Pool B:
    - South Korea 3–0 Serbia
    - France 3–2 Argentina
      - All four teams are tied on 6 points.
  - Pool C:
    - Bulgaria 1–3 Japan
      - Cuba and Russia lead the group with 9 points each.
  - Pool D:
    - Venezuela 0–3 Poland
      - Brazil lead the group with 11 points.

=== June 20, 2009 (Saturday) ===
==== Athletics ====
- European Team Championships in Leiria, Portugal, day 1:
  - Team standings: (1) Great Britain 165 points (2) Russia 164 (3) France 159.5

==== Auto racing ====
- Nationwide Series:
  - NorthernTool.com 250 in West Allis, Wisconsin:
    - (1) (Missouri) Carl Edwards (Ford, Roush Fenway Racing) (2) (Nevada) Kyle Busch (Toyota, Joe Gibbs Racing) (3) (Michigan) Brad Keselowski (Chevrolet, JR Motorsports)
- V8 Supercars:
  - Skycity Triple Crown in Darwin, Northern Territory
    - Round 9: (1) Jamie Whincup (AUS) (Ford Falcon) (2) Mark Winterbottom (AUS) (Ford Falcon) (3) Will Davison (AUS) (Holden Commodore)
      - Standings (after 9 of 26 races): (1) Whincup 1194 points (2) Davison 1077 (3) Garth Tander (AUS) (Holden Commodore) 843

==== Basketball ====
- French Pro A Final in Paris:
  - **ASVEL Basket** 55–41 Orléans
    - ASVEL win the championship for the 17th time, and their first since 2002.
- EuroBasket Women in Riga, Latvia:
  - 7th place game:
    - **Latvia** 67–59 Slovakia
  - 5th place game:
    - Italy 56–60 **Greece**
      - Greece qualify for 2010 World Championship.
  - 3rd place game:
    - (bronze) **Spain** 63–56 Belarus
  - Final:
    - (silver) Russia 53–57 (gold) **France**
      - France win the title for the second time.

==== Cycling ====
- UCI ProTour:
  - Tour de Suisse:
    - Stage 8: (1) Tony Martin (GER) (Team Columbia–High Road) 4h 56' 41" (2) Damiano Cunego (ITA) (Lampre–N.G.C.) s.t. (3) Fabian Cancellara (SUI) (Team Saxo Bank) + 2"
      - General classification: (1) Tadej Valjavec (SLO) (Ag2r–La Mondiale) 32h 19' 48" (2) Cancellara + 4" (3) Roman Kreuziger (CZE) (Liquigas) + 28"

==== Football (soccer) ====
- FIFA Confederations Cup in South Africa: (teams in **bold** advance to the semifinals)
  - Group A:
    - Iraq 0–0 New Zealand in Johannesburg
    - **Spain** 2–0 **South Africa** in Bloemfontein
      - Standings: Spain 9 points, South Africa 4, Iraq 2, New Zealand 1.
- 2010 FIFA World Cup Qualifying:
  - 2010 FIFA World Cup qualification (CAF) Third round, matchday 3:
    - Group A:
      - Morocco 0–0 Togo
        - Gabon lead the group with 6 points from 2 matches, ahead of Togo with 4 from 3.
    - Group B:
      - Kenya 2–1 Mozambique
      - Tunisia 0–0 Nigeria
        - Tunisia lead the group with 7 points, ahead of Nigeria with 5.
    - Group C:
      - Zambia 0–2 Algeria
        - Algeria lead the group with 7 points, ahead of Zambia with 4.
    - Group D:
      - Sudan 0–2 Ghana
        - Ghana lead the group with 9 points.
    - Group E:
      - Burkina Faso 2–3 Ivory Coast
        - Côte d'Ivoire lead the group with 9 points, followed by Burkina Faso with 6.
- 2009 UEFA Regions' Cup, final tournament in Croatia: (teams in **bold** advance to the final)
  - Group A:
    - **Oltenia** (Romania) 1–1 (Croatia) Zagreb
    - Bratislava (Slovakia) 0–5 (Russia) Privolzhie
      - Standings: Oltenia 7 points, Privolzhie 6, Zagreb 4, Bratislava 0
  - Group B:
    - **Castile and León** (Spain) 1–0 (Bosnia and Herzegovina) Gradiška
    - Kempen (Belgium) 2–1 (Republic of Ireland) Region I
      - Standings: Castile and León 9 points, Kempen 6, Region I 3, Gradiška 0

==== Golf ====
- Men's majors:
  - U.S. Open in Farmingdale, New York:
    - Leaders after second round: (1) Ricky Barnes (USA) 132 (−8) (2) Lucas Glover (USA) 133 (−7) (3) Mike Weir (CAN) 134 (−6)
      - Barnes sets a 36-hole scoring record for the U.S. Open.
    - Play is suspended due to rain, with the leaders yet to start the third round.
- The Amateur Championship in Formby, England:
  - Matteo Manassero (ITA) becomes the youngest person ever to win the event, at age 16.

==== Rugby union ====
- Mid-year test series:
  - Argentina 32–18 French Barbarians in Buenos Aires
  - Australia 34–12 Italy in Melbourne
  - New Zealand 14–10 France in Wellington
- Lions tour of South Africa:
  - First Test: South Africa 26–21 British & Irish Lions in Durban

==== Shooting ====
- ISSF World Cup in San Marino, San Marino: (Qualification scores in parentheses)
  - Men's double trap: (gold) Mo Junjie (CHN) 193 (144) (silver) Håkan Dahlby (SWE) 191 (145) (bronze) Joshua Richmond (USA) 190 (142)

==== Tennis ====
- ATP Tour:
  - Ordina Open in 's-Hertogenbosch, Netherlands:
    - Final: **Benjamin Becker (GER)** def. Raemon Sluiter (NED) 7–5, 6–3
      - Becker wins his first ATP Tour title.
  - Aegon International in Eastbourne, United Kingdom:
    - Final: **Dmitry Tursunov (RUS)** def. Frank Dancevic (CAN) 6–3, 7–6(5)
      - Tursunov wins his sixth title.
- WTA Tour:
  - Ordina Open in 's-Hertogenbosch, Netherlands:
    - Final: **Tamarine Tanasugarn (THA)** def. Yanina Wickmayer (BEL) 6–3, 7–5
      - Tanasugarn wins the tournament for the second straight year, and her third career title.
  - Aegon International in Eastbourne, United Kingdom:
    - Final: **Caroline Wozniacki (DEN)** def. Virginie Razzano (FRA) 7–6(5), 7–5
      - Wozniacki wins her second tournament this year, and her fifth career title.

==== Volleyball ====
- FIVB World League:
  - Pool A:
    - Netherlands 3–0 China
  - Pool B:
    - South Korea 1–3 Serbia
  - Pool C:
    - Bulgaria 3–1 Japan
    - Cuba 2–3 Russia
  - Pool D:
    - Brazil 3–0 Finland
      - Brazil win their fourth straight match.

=== June 19, 2009 (Friday) ===
==== Baseball ====
- College World Series in Omaha:
  - Game 11: LSU 14, Arkansas 5
  - Game 12: Texas 4, Arizona State 3
    - LSU and Texas advance to the final series.

==== Basketball ====
- EuroBasket Women in Riga, Latvia:
  - Classification rounds:
    - Slovakia 59–64 **Greece**
    - **Italy** 68–66 (OT) Latvia
  - Semifinals:
    - Belarus 56–64 **France**
    - Spain 61–77 **Russia**

==== Cricket ====
- ICC World Twenty20 in England:
  - Semifinal: Sri Lanka 158/5 (20/20 ov, Tillakaratne Dilshan 96*); West Indies 101 (17.4/20 ov, Chris Gayle 63*) at The Oval, London. **Sri Lanka win by 57 runs**.
    - Sri Lanka will play Pakistan in the final.
- ICC Women's World Twenty20 in England
  - Semifinal: Australia 163/5 (20/20 ov); England 165/2 (19.3/20 ov, Claire Taylor 76*) at The Oval, London. **England win by 8 wickets**.
    - England will play New Zealand in the final.

==== Cycling ====
- UCI ProTour:
  - Tour de Suisse:
    - Stage 7: (1) Kim Kirchen (LUX) (Team Columbia–High Road) 4h 56' 41" (2) Roman Kreuziger (CZE) (Liquigas) + 2" (3) Peter Velits (SVK) (Team Milram) + 7"
      - General classification: (1) Tadej Valjavec (SLO) (Ag2r–La Mondiale) 28h 07' 00" (2) Fabian Cancellara (SUI) (Team Saxo Bank) + 9" (3) Oliver Zaugg (SUI) (Liquigas) + 14"

==== Football (soccer) ====
- European Under-21 Championship in Sweden:
  - Group A:
    - Sweden 1–2 Italy
    - Belarus 0–0 Serbia
      - Standings: Italy 4 points, Sweden 3, Serbia 2, Belarus 1.

==== Golf ====
- Men's majors:
  - U.S. Open in Farmingdale, New York:
    - Leaders after first round: (1) Mike Weir (CAN) 64 (−6) (2) Peter Hanson (SWE) 66 (−4) (3) David Duval, Todd Hamilton & Ricky Barnes (all United States) 67 (−3)
    - Leaderboard at close of play: (1) Lucas Glover (USA) –6 (13 holes) (2) Barnes −5 (9 holes) (3) Hanson −4 (11) & Weir −4 (9)

==== Tennis ====
- World #1 Rafael Nadal announces that he will not play at Wimbledon because of tendinitis in his knees. He will be the first reigning gentlemen's singles champion to not defend his title since Goran Ivanišević in 2002, and only the second in the last 35 years. (ESPN)

==== Volleyball ====
- FIVB World League: (all times UTC)
  - Pool A:
    - Italy 1–3 United States
  - Pool B:
    - France 2–3 Argentina
  - Pool C:
    - Cuba 3–2 Russia
  - Pool D:
    - Brazil 3–2 Finland
    - Venezuela 2–3 Poland
      - Brazil and Cuba maintain their unbeaten record after 3 matches.

=== June 18, 2009 (Thursday) ===
==== Baseball ====
- College World Series in Omaha:
  - Game 10: Arizona State 12, North Carolina 5
    - North Carolina is eliminated.

==== Basketball ====
- Spanish ACB Playoffs Final:
  - Game 4: Regal FC Barcelona 90–77 TAU Cerámica. **Barcelona win series 3–1.**
    - Barcelona win the championship for the 15th time, after five years break.
- Bundesliga Playoffs Final:
  - Game 2: Telekom Baskets Bonn 70–79 EWE Baskets Oldenburg. **Series tied 1–1.**
- EuroBasket Women in Riga, Latvia:
  - Quarterfinals:
    - **France** 51–49 Greece
    - **Russia** 69–64 (OT) Latvia

==== Cricket ====
- ICC World Twenty20 in England:
  - Semifinal: Pakistan 149/4 (20/20 ov, Shahid Afridi 51); South Africa 142/5 (20/20 ov, Jacques Kallis 64) in Nottingham. **Pakistan win by 7 runs**.
- ICC Women's World Twenty20 in England
  - Semifinal: New Zealand 145/5 (20/20 ov, Aimee Watkins 89*); India 93/9 (20.0/20 ov) in Nottingham. **New Zealand win by 52 runs**.

==== Cycling ====
- UCI ProTour:
  - Tour de Suisse:
    - Stage 6: (1) Mark Cavendish (GBR) HTC–Highroad) 4h 18' 26" (2) Óscar Freire (ESP) (Visma–Lease a Bike) same time (3) Francesco Gavazzi (ITA) (UAE Team Emirates XRG) s.t.
      - General classification: (1) Tadej Valjavec (SLO) (Decathlon CMA CGM Team) 23h 10' 27" (2) Fabian Cancellara (SWI) (Tinkoff) +9" (3) Oliver Zaugg (SWI) (Liquigas) +14"

==== Football (soccer) ====
- FIFA Confederations Cup in South Africa:
  - Group B:
    - United States 0–3 Brazil in Pretoria
    - Egypt 1–0 Italy in Johannesburg
      - Standings: Brazil 6 points, Italy, Egypt 3, USA 0.
- European Under-21 Championship in Sweden: (teams in **bold** advance to the semifinals)
  - Group B:
    - Germany 2–0 Finland
    - Spain 0–2 **England**
      - Standings: England 6, Germany 4, Spain 1, Finland 0.
- Copa Libertadores Quarterfinals, second leg: (first leg result in parentheses)
  - **Estudiantes** (Argentina) 1–0 (1–0) (Uruguay) Defensor Sporting
  - São Paulo (Brazil) 0–2 (1–2) (Brazil) **Cruzeiro**

==== Golf ====
- Men's majors:
  - U.S. Open in Farmingdale, New York, first round:
    - Play is postponed until Friday due to heavy rain. No one finished more than 11 holes, and only half of the 156 players even started their rounds.

==== Shooting ====
- ISSF World Cup in San Marino, San Marino: (Qualification scores in parentheses)
  - Men's skeet: (gold) Georgios Achilleos (CYP) 146 (121) (silver) Zaid Almutairi (KUW) 145 (121) (bronze) Tore Brovold (NOR) 143 (118)

=== June 17, 2009 (Wednesday) ===
==== Baseball ====
- College World Series in Omaha:
  - Game 9: Arkansas 4, Virginia 3 (12 innings)
    - Virginia is eliminated.

==== Basketball ====
- Turkish League Playoffs Final:
  - Game 6: Fenerbahçe Ülker 76–79 Efes Pilsen. **Efes Pilsen win series 4–2**.
    - Efes Pilsen win the championship for the 13th time.
- EuroBasket Women in Riga, Latvia:
  - Quarterfinals:
    - Slovakia 68–70 (OT) **Belarus**
    - **Spain** 61–42 Italy

==== Cycling ====
- UCI ProTour:
  - Tour de Suisse:
    - Stage 5: (1) Michael Albasini (SUI) (HTC–Highroad) 5h 24' 03" (2) Fabian Cancellara (SUI) (Tinkoff) same time (3) Damiano Cunego (GER) (UAE Team Emirates XRG) s.t.
      - General classification: (1) Tadej Valjavec (SLO) (Decathlon CMA CGM Team) 18h 52' 01" (2) Oliver Zaugg (SWI) (Liquigas) +14" (3) Cancellara +14"

==== Football (soccer) ====
- FIFA Confederations Cup in South Africa: (teams in **bold** advance to the semifinals)
  - Group A:
    - **Spain** 1–0 Iraq in Bloemfontein
    - South Africa 2–0 New Zealand in Rustenburg
      - Standings: Spain 6 points, South Africa 4, Iraq 1, New Zealand 0.
- 2010 FIFA World Cup qualification:
  - AFC (Asia) Fourth round, matchday 10 of 10: (teams in **bold** qualify for 2010 FIFA World Cup; teams in italics advance to the playoffs)
    - Group 1:
      - **Australia** 2–1 **Japan**
      - Bahrain 1–0 Uzbekistan
        - Final standings: **Australia** 20 points, **Japan (Heian period)** 15, Bahrain 10, Qatar 6, Uzbekistan 4.
    - Group 2:
      - **South Korea** 1–1 Iran
      - Saudi Arabia 0–0 **North Korea**
        - Final standings: **South Korea** 16 points, **North Korea** 12 (goals difference +2), Saudi Arabia 12 (GD 0), Iran 11, UAE 1.
        - North Korea qualify for the World Cup for the second time; their only other appearance was in 1966.
        - Saudi Arabia and Bahrain will play in a two-legged playoff, with the winner meeting New Zealand for a berth in the World Cup.
- Copa Libertadores Quarterfinals, second leg: (first leg result in parentheses)
  - **Nacional** (Uruguay) 0–0 (1–1) (Brazil) Palmeiras
    - Nacional win on away goals rule.
  - **Grêmio** (Brazil) 0–0 (1–1) (Venezuela) Caracas
    - Grêmio win on away goals rule.
- Copa do Brasil Final, first leg:
  - Corinthians 2–0 Internacional
- UEFA Regions' Cup in Croatia: (teams in **bold** advance to the final)
  - Group A:
    - Zagreb (Croatia) 0–2 (Russia) Privolzhie
    - Bratislava (Slovakia) 0–2 (Romania) Oltenia
  - Group B:
    - Gradiška (Bosnia and Herzegovina) 0–3 (Republic of Ireland) Region I
    - Kempen (Belgium) 1–4 (Spain) **Castile and León**

==== Shooting ====
- ISSF World Cup in San Marino, San Marino: (Qualification scores in parentheses)
  - Women's skeet: (gold) Chiara Cainero (ITA) 95 (72) (silver) Kim Rhode (USA) 88+3 (65) (bronze) Christine Brinker (GER) 88+2 (68)

=== June 16, 2009 (Tuesday) ===
==== Baseball ====
- Major League Baseball news:
  - The New York Times reports that Sammy Sosa, one of six players to have hit 600 home runs during his career, tested positive for performance-enhancing drugs during the 2003 season.
- College World Series in Omaha (all times CDT/UTC−5):
  - Game 7: North Carolina 11, Southern Miss 4.
    - Southern Miss is eliminated.
  - Game 8: Texas 10, Arizona State 6

==== Basketball ====
- Italian Serie A Playoffs Final:
  - Game 4: Armani Jeans Milano 47–82 Montepaschi Siena. **Siena win series 4–0.**
    - Montepaschi, who lost only once during the domestic season and went unbeaten through the playoffs, become the first Serie A club to win three consecutive titles since Virtus Bologna in 1993 through 1995.
- Spanish ACB Playoffs Final:
  - Game 3: Regal FC Barcelona 85–67 TAU Cerámica. **Barcelona lead series 2–1.**
- EuroBasket Women in Riga, Latvia: (teams in **bold** advance to the quarterfinals)
  - Group F:
    - **Italy** 72–58 Lithuania
    - Turkey 70–86 **Belarus**
    - **France** 72–66 **Russia**
      - Final standings: France 10 points, Russia 9, Belarus 7, Italy 7, Turkey 7, Lithuania 5.

==== Cricket ====
- ICC World Twenty20 in England: (teams in **bold** advance to the semifinals; teams in ~~strike~~ are eliminated)
  - Group E: **South Africa** 130/5 (20/20 ov); ~~India~~ 118/8 (20/20 ov) in Nottingham. **South Africa win by 12 runs**.
    - Final standings: **South Africa** 6 points, **West Indies** 4, England 2, India 0.
  - Group F: **Sri Lanka** 158/5 (20/20 ov); ~~New Zealand~~ 110 (17.0/20 ov) in Nottingham. **Sri Lanka win by 48 runs**.
    - Final standings: **Sri Lanka** 6 points, **Pakistan 4**, New Zealand 2, Ireland 0.
- ICC Women's World Twenty20 in England:
  - Group A: **Australia** 164/6 (20/20 ov); ~~South Africa~~ 140/7 (20/20 ov) in Taunton. **Australia win by 24 runs**.
    - Final standings: **New Zealand** 6 points, **Australia** 4, West Indies 2, South Africa 0.
  - Group B: **England** 123 (20/20 ov); ~~Pakistan~~ 60 (16.5/20 ov) in Taunton. **England win by 63 runs**.
    - Final standings: **England** 6 points, **India** 4, Sri Lanka 2, Pakistan 0.

==== Cycling ====
- UCI ProTour:
  - Tour de Suisse:
    - Stage 4: (1) Matti Breschel (DEN) (Team Saxo Bank) 3h 57' 03" (2) Maxim Iglinsky (KAZ) (Astana) s.t. (3) Tadej Valjavec (SLO) (Ag2r–La Mondiale) s.t.
      - General classification: (1) Valjavec 13h 27' 57" (2) Andy Schleck (LUX) (Team Saxo Bank) +2' (3) Peter Velits (SVK) (Team Milram) +11'

==== Football (soccer) ====
- European Under-21 Championship in Sweden:
  - Group A:
    - Sweden 5–1 Belarus
      - Marcus Berg scores a hat-trick.
    - Italy 0 –0 Serbia

==== Rugby union ====
- Lions tour of South Africa:
  - Southern Kings 8–20 British & Irish Lions in Port Elizabeth

=== June 15, 2009 (Monday) ===
==== Baseball ====
- College World Series in Omaha:
  - Game 5: Virginia 7, Cal State Fullerton 5
    - CS Fullerton is eliminated.
  - Game 6: LSU 9, Arkansas 1

==== Basketball ====
- EuroBasket Women in Riga, Latvia: (teams in **bold** advance to the quarterfinals)
  - Group E:
    - **Slovakia** 57–59 Greece
    - Poland 68–82 Czech Republic
    - **Latvia** 60–67 **Spain**
      - Standings: Spain 10 points, Slovakia 8, Latvia 8, Greece 7, Czech Republic 6, Poland 6.

==== Cricket ====
- ICC World Twenty20 in England: (teams in **bold** advance to the semifinals; teams in ~~strike~~ are eliminated)
  - Group E: ~~England~~ 161/6 (20/20 ov); **West Indies** 82/5 (8.2/9 ov) at The Oval, London. **West Indies win by 5 wickets (D/L method)**.
  - Group F: **Pakistan** 159/5 (20/20 ov); ~~Ireland~~ 120/9 (20/20 ov) at The Oval, London. **Pakistan win by 39 runs**.
- ICC Women's World Twenty20 in England:
  - Group A: South Africa 124/4 (20/20 ov); **New Zealand** 127/4 (18.1/20 ov) in Taunton. **New Zealand win by 6 wickets**.
  - Group B: ~~Sri Lanka~~ 94/6 (18/18 ov); **India** 95/5 (16.5/18 ov) in Taunton. **India win by 5 wickets**.

==== Cycling ====
- UCI ProTour:
  - Tour de Suisse:
    - Stage 3: (1) Mark Cavendish (GBR) (HTC–Highroad) 4h 39' 27" (2) Óscar Freire (ESP) (Visma–Lease a Bike) same time (3) Thor Hushovd (NOR) (Cervélo TestTeam) s.t.
      - General classification: (1) Fabian Cancellara (SUI) (Tinkoff) 8h 25' 39" (2) Roman Kreuziger (CZE) (Liquigas) +22' (3) Andreas Klöden (GER) (XDS Astana Team) +25'

==== Football (soccer) ====
- FIFA Confederations Cup in South Africa:
  - Group B:
    - Brazil 4–3 Egypt in Bloemfontein
    - United States 1–3 Italy in Pretoria
- European Under-21 Championship in Sweden:
  - Group B:
    - England 2–1 Finland
    - Spain 0–0 Germany
- UEFA Regions' Cup in Croatia:
  - Group A:
    - Zagreb (Croatia) 2–0 (Slovakia) Bratislava
    - Privolzhie (Russia) 0–2 (Romania) Oltenia
  - Group B:
    - Region I (Republic of Ireland) 0–2 (Spain) Castile and León
    - Gradiška (Bosnia and Herzegovina) 0–1 (Belgium) Kempen

=== June 14, 2009 (Sunday) ===
==== Athletics ====
- Golden League:
  - Internationales Stadionfest in Berlin, Germany: (Golden League events in **bold**)
    - **Men 100 m: (1) Daniel Bailey (ANT) 10.03**
    - **Men 400 m: (1) Chris Brown (BAH) 45.61**
    - Men 1500 m: (1) Augustine Kiprono Choge (KEN) 3:29.47
    - **Men 5000 m: (1) Kenenisa Bekele (ETH) 13:00.76**
    - **Men 110 m hurdles: (1) Dexter Faulk (USA) 13.18**
    - Men long jump: (1) Godfrey Khotso Mokoena (RSA) 8.33
    - Men discus: (1) Gerd Kanter (EST) 67.88
    - **Men javeline: (1) Tero Pitkämäki (FIN) 86.53**
    - Men 4 × 100 m relay: (1) Great Britain 38.52
    - **Women 100 m: (1) Kerron Stewart (JAM) 11.00**
    - **Women 400 m: (1) Sanya Richards (USA) 49.57**
    - **Women 100 m hurdles: (1) Damu Cherry (USA) 12.76**
    - **Women high jump: (1) Ariane Friedrich (GER) 2.06**
    - **Women pole vault: (1) Elena Isinbaeva (RUS) 4.83**
    - Women shot put: (1) Nadine Kleinert (GER) 19.39
    - Women 4 × 100 m relay: (1) Great Britain 43.18

==== Auto racing ====
- Sprint Cup Series:
  - Lifelock 400 in Brooklyn, Michigan: (1) (Arkansas) Mark Martin (Chevrolet, Hendrick Motorsports) (2) (California) Jeff Gordon (Chevrolet, Hendrick Motorsports) (3) (Virginia) Denny Hamlin (Toyota, Joe Gibbs Racing)
    - Drivers' standings (after 15 of 26 races leading to the Chase for the Sprint Cup): (1) Tony Stewart (Indiana) (Chevrolet, Stewart Haas Racing) 2189 points (2) Gordon 2142 (3) Jimmie Johnson (California) (Chevrolet, Hendrick Motorsports) 2047
- World Rally Championship:
  - Acropolis Rally: (1) Mikko Hirvonen (FIN) (Ford Focus RS WRC 08) (2) Sébastien Ogier (FRA) (Citroën C4 WRC) (3) Jari-Matti Latvala (FIN) (Ford Focus RS WRC 08)
    - Drivers' Standings (after 7 of 12 rallies): (1) Sébastien Loeb (FRA) 55 points (2) Hirvonen 48 (3) Dani Sordo (ESP) 31
- Sports cars endurance racing:
  - 24 Hours of Le Mans in Le Mans, France:
    - (1) David Brabham (AUS), Marc Gené (ESP) & Alexander Wurz (AUT) (Peugeot Sport) 382 laps (2) Sébastien Bourdais (FRA), Franck Montagny (FRA) & Stéphane Sarrazin (FRA) (Peugeot Sport) 381 laps (3) Rinaldo Capello (ITA), Tom Kristensen (DEN) & Allan McNish (GBR) (Audi Sport Team Joest) 376 laps

==== Badminton ====
- BWF Super Series:
  - Singapore Super Series in Singapore:
    - Men's singles: Bao Chunlai (CHN) bt Boonsak Ponsana (THA) 21–19 16–21 21–15
    - Women's singles: Zhou Mi (HKG) [1] bt Xie Xingfang (CHN) [8] 21–19 18–21 21–10
    - Men's doubles: Anthony Clark (ENG)/Nathan Robertson (ENG) bt Markis Kido (INA)/Hendra Setiawan (INA) [1] 21–12 21–11
    - Women's doubles: Zhang Yawen (CHN)/Zhao Tingting (CHN) [5] bt Nitya Krishinda Maheswari (INA)/Greysia Polii (INA) 21–14 21–13
    - Mixed doubles: Zheng Bo/Ma Jin (CHN) [5] bt Xie Zhongbo (CHN)/Zhang Yawen (CHN) [6] 19–21 21–19 21–11

==== Baseball ====
- College World Series in Omaha:
  - Game 3: Arizona State 5, North Carolina 2 (10 innings)
  - Game 4: Texas 7, Southern Miss 6

==== Basketball ====
- NBA Finals (seeding in parentheses):
  - Game 5 in Orlando: (W1) Los Angeles Lakers 99, (E3) Orlando Magic 86. **Lakers win series 4–1.**
    - The Lakers' Kobe Bryant is named Finals MVP. Phil Jackson wins his 10th NBA title as a head coach, surpassing Red Auerbach for the most in league history.
- Italian Serie A Playoffs Final:
  - Game 3: Armani Jeans Milano 72–73 Montepaschi Siena. **Siena lead series 3–0.**
- Turkish League Playoffs Final:
  - Game 5: Efes Pilsen 74–68 Fenerbahçe Ülker. **Efes Pilsen lead series 3–2.**
- Bundesliga Playoffs Final:
  - Game 1: EWE Baskets Oldenburg 72–74 Telekom Baskets Bonn. **Bonn lead series 1–0.**
- EuroBasket Women in Riga, Latvia: (teams in **bold** advance to the quarterfinals)
  - Group F:
    - Belarus 61–55 Lithuania
    - **Russia** 67–59 Italy
    - Turkey 43–55 **France**

==== Cricket ====
- ICC World Twenty20 in England: (teams in **bold** advance to the semifinals; teams in ~~strike~~ are eliminated)
  - Group E: England 153/7 (20/20 ov); ~~India~~ 150/5 (20/20 ov) at Lord's, London. **England win by 3 runs**.
    - **South Africa** advance to the semifinals.
  - Group F: Sri Lanka 144/9 (20/20 ov); Ireland 135/7 (20/20 ov) at Lord's, London. **Sri Lanka win by 9 runs**.
- ICC Women's World Twenty20 in England:
  - Group A: West Indies 135/8 (20/20 ov); Australia 136/2 (17.2/20 ov) in Taunton. **Australia win by 8 wickets**.
    - **New Zealand** advance to the semifinals.
  - Group B: **England** 140/7 (20/20 ov); Sri Lanka 69/8 (20/20 ov) in Taunton. **England win by 71 runs**.

==== Cycling ====
- UCI ProTour:
  - Critérium du Dauphiné Libéré:
    - Stage 8: (1) Stef Clement (NED) (Visma–Lease a Bike) 3h 30' 17" (2) Timmy Duggan (USA) (EF Education–EasyPost) same time (3) Sébastien Joly (FRA) (Groupama–FDJ United) +2"
      - Final general classification: (1) Alejandro Valverde (ESP) (Movistar Team) 26h 33' 15" (2) Cadel Evans (AUS) (Lotto–Intermarché) +16" (3) Alberto Contador (ESP) (XDS Astana Team) +1' 18"
  - Tour de Suisse:
    - Stage 2: (1) Bernhard Eisel (AUT) (HTC–Highroad) 3h 36' 54" (2) Peter Velits (SVK) (Team Milram) s.t. (3) Óscar Freire (ESP) (Visma–Lease a Bike) s.t.
      - General classification: (1) Fabian Cancellara (SUI) (Tinkoff) 3h 46' 12" (2) Roman Kreuziger (CZE) (Liquigas) +22" (3) Andreas Klöden (GER) (XDS Astana Team) +25"

==== Football (soccer) ====
- FIFA Confederations Cup in South Africa:
  - Group A:
    - South Africa 0–0 Iraq in Johannesburg
    - New Zealand 0–5 Spain in Rustenburg
      - Fernando Torres scores a hat-trick in 11 minutes, as Spain take a 4–0 lead after 24 minutes.
- Argentine Primera División – Clausura, matchday 17 of 19:
  - (16) San Lorenzo 0–1 (3) Huracán
    - Huracán's win put them in second place, 1 point behind Vélez Sarsfield.

==== Golf ====
- Women's majors:
  - LPGA Championship in Havre de Grace, Maryland:
    - (1) Anna Nordqvist (SWE) 273 (−15) (2) Lindsey Wright (AUS) 277 (−11) (3) Jiyai Shin (KOR) 278 (−10)
      - Nordqvist wins her first LPGA title in only her fifth tournament on the tour.
- PGA Tour:
  - St. Jude Classic in Memphis, Tennessee:
    - (1) Brian Gay (USA) 262 (−18) (2) David Toms (USA) & Bryce Molder (USA) 267 (−13)
      - With his second win of the year, Gay qualified for the U.S. Open next week.

==== Motorcycle racing ====
- Moto GP:
  - Catalan motorcycle Grand Prix in Montmelo, Spain:
    - (1) Valentino Rossi (ITA) (Yamaha) 43:11.897 (2) Jorge Lorenzo (ESP) (Yamaha) +0.095 (3) Casey Stoner (AUS) (Ducati) +8.884
      - Riders' standings (after 6 of 17 races): (1) Rossi 106 points (2) Lorenzo 106 (3) Stoner 106

==== Table tennis ====
- Japan Open in Wakayama:
  - Men's singles final: Oh Sang-Eun (KOR) bt Patrick Baum (GER) 4–3 (7–11, 13–11, 11–6, 9–11, 11–7, 6–11, 11–6)
  - Women's singles final: Park Mi-Young (KOR) bt Sayaka Hirano (JPN) 4–1 (11–8, 7–11, 11–9, 11–6, 11–4)
  - Men's doubles final: Seiya Kishikawa/Jun Mizutani (JPN) bt Oh Sang-Eun/Yoon Jae-Young (KOR) 4–3 (13–11, 6–11, 9–11, 11–8, 5–11, 11–9, 11–7)
  - Women's doubles final: Sayaka Hirano/Reiko Hiura (JPN) bt Kim Jung-Hyun/Seok Ha-Jung (KOR) 4–2 (11–7, 11–8, 8–11, 9–11, 11–6, 11–8)

==== Tennis ====
- ATP Tour:
  - Aegon Championships in London, United Kingdom:
    - Final: **Andy Murray (GBR)** def. James Blake (USA) 7–5, 6–4
      - Murray wins his fourth title this year and the 12th of his career, and becomes the first British winner of this tournament since 1938.
  - Gerry Weber Open in Halle, Germany:
    - Final: **Tommy Haas (GER)** def. Novak Djokovic (SRB) 6–3, 6–7(4), 6–1
      - Haas, who entered the tournament as a wild card, wins his 12th career title, the first since February 2007 and the first outside the USA since October 2001.
- WTA Tour:
  - Aegon Classic in Birmingham, United Kingdom:
    - Final: **Magdaléna Rybáriková (SVK)** def. Li Na (CHN) 6–0, 7–6(2)
      - Rybáriková wins her first WTA Tour title.

==== Volleyball ====
- FIVB World League:
  - Pool A:
    - Netherlands 2–3 United States
  - Pool B:
    - South Korea 2–3 Argentina
    - Serbia 3–1 France
  - Pool C:
    - Japan 1–3 Russia
  - Pool D:
    - Brazil 3–0 Poland
    - Venezuela 1–3 Finland
      - Cuba, Russia and Brazil win their two opening matches against Bulgaria, Japan and Poland respectively. All other teams split their matches.

=== June 13, 2009 (Saturday) ===
==== Auto racing ====
- Nationwide Series:
  - Meijer 300 in Sparta, Kentucky
    - (1) Joey Logano (Connecticut) (Joe Gibbs Racing) (2) Kyle Busch (Nevada) (Joe Gibbs Racing) (3) Brad Keselowski (Michigan) (JR Motorsports)

==== Baseball ====
- College World Series in Omaha:
  - Game 1: Arkansas 10, Cal State Fullerton 6
  - Game 2: LSU 9, Virginia 5

==== Basketball ====
- Spanish ACB Playoffs Final:
  - Game 2: TAU Cerámica 75–67 Regal FC Barcelona. **Series tied 1–1**.
- EuroBasket Women in Riga, Latvia: (teams in **bold** advance to the quarterfinals)
  - Group E:
    - Greece 62–45 Czech Republic
    - **Spain** 67–55 Poland
    - **Slovakia** 78–69 **Latvia**

==== Cricket ====
- ICC World Twenty20 in England:
  - Group E: South Africa 183/7 (20/20 ov); West Indies 163/9 (20.0/20 ov) at The Oval, London. **South Africa win by 20 runs**.
  - Group F: New Zealand 99 (18.3/20 ov); Pakistan 100/4 (13.1/20 ov) at The Oval, London. **Pakistan win by 6 wickets**.
- ICC Women's World Twenty20 in England:
  - Group A: New Zealand 158/6 20(/20 ov); West Indies 106/7 (20/20 ov) in Taunton. **New Zealand win by 52 runs**.
  - Group B: Pakistan 75 (19.5/20 ov); India 78/5 (17.4/20 ov) in Taunton. **India win by 5 wickets**.

==== Cycling ====
- UCI ProTour:
  - Critérium du Dauphiné Libéré:
    - Stage 7: (1) David Moncoutié (FRA) (Cofidis) 4hr 44' 26" (2) Robert Gesink (NED) (Visma–Lease a Bike) +41" (3) Cadel Evans (AUS) (Lotto–Intermarché) +41"
      - General classification: (1) Alejandro Valverde (ESP) (Movistar Team) 23hr 0' 53" (2) Evans at +16" (3) Alberto Contador (ESP) (XDS Astana Team) at +1' 18"
  - Tour de Suisse:
    - Stage 1 (ITT): (1) Fabian Cancellara (SUI) (Team Saxo Bank) 9' 21" (2) Roman Kreuziger (CZE) (Liquigas) +19" (3) Andreas Klöden (GER) (Astana) +22"

==== Football (soccer) ====
- Argentine Primera División – Clausura, matchday 17 of 19:
  - (20) Arsenal 4–1 (1) Lanús
  - (2) Vélez Sarsfield 2–0 (9) Newell's Old Boys
    - Vélez Sársfield take the lead with 36 points, 2 ahead of Lanús.
- Romanian Cup Final in Târgu Jiu:
  - **CFR Cluj** 3–0 FC Timișoara
    - Cluj has already qualified for Europa League, while Timișoara qualified for the Champions League as league runner-up.

==== Golf ====
- Women's majors:
  - LPGA Championship in Havre de Grace, Maryland, third round:
    - Leaderboard: (1) Anna Nordqvist (SWE) -10 (15 holes) (2) Lindsey Wright (AUS) -9 (15 holes) (3) Na Yeon Choi (KOR) -8 (17 holes)
      - Play is suspended due to darkness after rain delays.

==== Mixed martial arts ====
- UFC 99 in Cologne, Germany

==== Rugby union ====
- Mid-year test series:
  - Argentina 24–22 England in Salta
  - Australia 31–8 Italy in Canberra
  - New Zealand 22–27 France in Dunedin
    - France win their first match in New Zealand in 15 years.
- Lions tour of South Africa:
  - Western province 23–26 British & Irish Lions in Cape Town

==== Shooting ====
- ISSF World Cup in Minsk, Belarus: (Qualification scores in parentheses)
  - Men's trap: (gold) Giovanni Pellielo (ITA) 147 (122) (silver) Michael Diamond (AUS) 144 (123) (bronze) Manavjit Singh Sandhu (IND) 142 (121)

==== Volleyball ====
- FIVB World League:
  - Pool A:
    - Netherlands 3–0 United States
    - Italy 0–3 China
  - Pool B:
    - South Korea 3–2 Argentina
  - Pool C:
    - Japan 0–3 Russia
    - Cuba 3–1 Bulgaria
  - Pool D:
    - Brazil 3–1 Poland

=== June 12, 2009 (Friday) ===
==== Basketball ====
- Italian Serie A Playoffs Final:
  - Game 2: Montepaschi Siena 79–66 Armani Jeans Milano. **Montepaschi leads series 2–0.**
- EuroBasket Women in Riga, Latvia: (teams in **bold** advance to the quarterfinals)
  - Group F:
    - Italy 59–64 Turkey
    - Belarus 51–66 **Russia**
    - Lithuania 55–57 **France**

==== Cricket ====
- ICC World Twenty20 in England:
  - Group E: India 153/7 (20/20 ov); West Indies 156/3 (18.4/20 ov) at Lord's, London. **West Indies win by 7 wickets**.
  - Group F: Sri Lanka 150/7 (20/20 ov); Pakistan 131/9 (20/20 ov) at Lord's, London. **Sri Lanka win by 19 runs**.
- ICC Women's World Twenty20 in England:
  - Group A: Australia 123/8 (20/20 ov); New Zealand 127/1 (16.2/20 ov) in Taunton. **New Zealand win by 9 wickets**.
  - Group B: Pakistan 104/7 (20/20 ov); Sri Lanka 105/6 (18.2/20 ov) in Taunton. **Sri Lanka win by 4 wickets**.

==== Cycling ====
- UCI ProTour:
  - Critérium du Dauphiné Libéré:
    - Stage 6: (1) Pierrick Fédrigo (FRA) (Bbox Bouygues Telecom) 2hr 48' 17" (2) Jurgen Van de Walle (BEL) (Quick-Step) +3" (3) Stéphane Goubert (FRA) (Ag2r–La Mondiale) +5"
      - General classification: (1) Alejandro Valverde (ESP) (Caisse d'Epargne) 18hr 15' 46" (2) Cadel Evans (AUS) (Silence–Lotto) +16" (3) Alberto Contador (ESP) (Astana) +1' 04"

==== Golf ====
- Women's majors:
  - LPGA Championship in Havre de Grace, Maryland:
    - Leaders after second round: (1) Anna Nordqvist (SWE) 136 (−8) (2) Nicole Castrale (USA) 137 (−7) (3) Katherine Hull (AUS) and Lindsey Wright (AUS) 138 (−6)

==== Ice hockey ====
- Stanley Cup Final (seeding in parentheses):
  - Game 7 in Detroit: (E4) Pittsburgh Penguins 2, (W2) Detroit Red Wings 1. **Penguins win series 4–3.**
    - Max Talbot scores both of the Penguins' goals in the second period, and the Pens hold on to lift the Stanley Cup for the first time since 1992. This also marks the first time that a road team has won the seventh game of the Stanley Cup Final since the Montreal Canadiens in 1971. The Pens' Evgeni Malkin wins the Conn Smythe Trophy as MVP of the Stanley Cup playoffs.

==== Shooting ====
- ISSF World Cup in Minsk, Belarus: (Qualification scores in parentheses)
  - Women's trap: (gold) Liu Yingzi (CHN) 90 (69) (silver) Jessica Rossi (ITA) 88+4 (70) (bronze) Susanne Kiermayer (GER) 88+3 (68)

==== Volleyball ====
- FIVB World League:
  - Pool A:
    - Italy 3–0 China
  - Pool B:
    - Serbia 0–3 France
  - Pool C:
    - Cuba 3–1 Bulgaria
  - Pool D:
    - Venezuela 3–0 Finland

=== June 11, 2009 (Thursday) ===
==== Basketball ====
- NBA Finals (seeding in parentheses):
  - Game 4 in Orlando: (W1) Los Angeles Lakers 99, (E3) Orlando Magic 91 (OT). **Lakers lead series 3–1.**
- Spanish ACB Playoffs Final:
  - Game 1: TAU Cerámica 80–82 Regal FC Barcelona. **Barcelona lead series 1–0.**
- Turkish League Playoffs Final:
  - Game 4: Fenerbahçe Ülker 68–77 Efes Pilsen. **Series tied 2–2.**
- EuroBasket Women in Riga, Latvia: (teams in **bold** advance to the quarterfinals)
  - Group E:
    - Poland 56–65 Slovakia
    - Greece 48–67 **Spain**
    - Czech Republic 47–65 **Latvia**

==== Cricket ====
- ICC World Twenty20 in England:
  - Group E: England 111 (19.5/20 ov); v South Africa 114/3 (18.2/20 ov) in Nottingham. **South Africa win by 7 wickets**.
  - Group F: New Zealand 198/5 (20/20 ov); Ireland 115 (16.4/20 ov) in Nottingham. **New Zealand win by 83 runs**.
- ICC Women's World Twenty20 in England:
  - Group A: West Indies 123/7 (20/20 ov); South Africa 119 (19.4/20 ov) in Taunton. **West Indies win by 4 runs**.
  - Group B: India 112/8 (20/20 ov); England 113/0 (15.4/20 ov) in Taunton. **England win by 10 wickets**.

==== Cycling ====
- UCI ProTour:
  - Critérium du Dauphiné Libéré:
    - Stage 5: (1) Sylwester Szmyd (POL) (Liquigas) 4h 5' 4" (2) Alejandro Valverde (ESP) (Caisse d'Epargne) s.t. (3) Haimar Zubeldia (ESP) (Astana) + 1' 14"
      - General classification: (1) Valverde 15h 23' 17" (2) Cadel Evans (AUS) (Silence–Lotto) + 16" (3) Alberto Contador (ESP) (Astana) + 1' 04"

==== Football (soccer) ====
- Manchester United F.C. accepts an offer for a record €93.9 million (£80 million, US$132 million) transfer fee from Real Madrid C.F. for the services of Cristiano Ronaldo. Ronaldo has until June 30 to accept a contract from Real Madrid. (ESPN Soccernet)

==== Golf ====
- Women's majors:
  - LPGA Championship in Havre de Grace, Maryland:
    - Leaders after first round: (1) Nicole Castrale (USA) 65 (−7) (2) Anna Nordqvist (SWE) 66 (−6) (3) Shanshan Feng (CHN) 67 (−5)

=== June 10, 2009 (Wednesday) ===
==== Basketball ====
- Italian Serie A Playoffs Final:
  - Game 1: Montepaschi Siena 80–57 Armani Jeans Milano. **Montepaschi leads series 1–0.**

==== Cricket ====
- ICC World Twenty20 in England: (teams in **bold** advance to the Super Eight; teams in ~~strike~~ are eliminated)
  - Group A: **Ireland** 112/8 (18/18 ov); **India** 113/2 (15.3/18 ov) in Nottingham. **India win by 8 wickets**.
  - Group C: **Sri Lanka** 192/5 (20/20 ov); **West Indies** 177/5 (20/20 ov) in Nottingham. **Sri Lanka win by 15 runs.**

==== Cycling ====
- UCI ProTour:
  - Critérium du Dauphiné Libéré:
    - Stage 4 (ITT): (1) Bert Grabsch (GER) (Team Columbia–High Road) 51' 26" (2) Cadel Evans (AUS) (Silence–Lotto) + 7" (3) David Millar (GBR) (Garmin–Slipstream) + 39"
      - General classification: (1) Evans (2) Alberto Contador (ESP) (Astana) + 45" (3) Grabsch + 48"

==== Football (soccer) ====
- 2010 FIFA World Cup qualification: (teams that qualify for 2010 FIFA World Cup in **bold**; teams that clinch playoff berth in italics; all times UTC)
  - AFC (Asia) Fourth round, matchday 9 of 10:
    - Group 1:
      - **Australia** 2–0 Bahrain
      - **Japan** 1–1 Qatar
        - Standings (7 matches unless stated otherwise): **Australia** 17 points, **Japan (Heian period)** 15, Bahrain 7, Qatar 6 (8 matches), Uzbekistan 4.
          - A draw or win for Bahrain against Uzbekistan on June 17 will earn them a playoff berth; Uzbekistan must win to advance.
    - Group 2:
      - **South Korea** 0–0 Saudi Arabia
      - Iran 1–0 United Arab Emirates
        - Standings (7 matches unless stated otherwise): **South Korea** 15 points, North Korea, Saudi Arabia 11, Iran 10, UAE 1 (8 matches).
          - The winner of Saudi Arabia vs North Korea match on June 17 will qualify for 2010 FIFA World Cup. North Korea could also qualify with a draw, unless Iran beat South Korea and qualify themselves.
  - UEFA (Europe):
    - Group 1:
      - Sweden 4–0 Malta
        - Standings: Denmark 16 points, Hungary 13, Portugal & Sweden 9.
    - Group 4:
      - Finland 0–3 Russia
        - Standings: Germany 16 points, Russia 15, Finland 10.
    - Group 6:
      - Ukraine 2–1 Kazakhstan
      - England 6–0 Andorra
        - Standings: England 21 points, Croatia & Ukraine 11.
    - Group 7:
      - Faroe Islands 0–2 Serbia
        - Standings: Serbia 18 points, France 10, Lithuania 9.
    - Group 9:
      - North Macedonia 2–0 Iceland
      - **Netherlands** 2–0 Norway
        - Standings: **Netherlands** 21 points, Scotland & Macedonia 7.
  - CONMEBOL (South America), matchday 14 of 18:
    - Ecuador 2–0 Argentina
    - Colombia 1–0 Peru
    - Brazil 2–1 Paraguay
    - Chile 4–0 Bolivia
    - Venezuela 2–2 Uruguay
      - Standings: Brazil 27 points, Chile 26, Paraguay 24, Argentina 22, Ecuador 20, Uruguay 18, Colombia 17, Venezuela 17, Bolivia 12, Peru 7.
  - CONCACAF (North & Central America) Fourth round, matchday 5 of 10:
    - Honduras 1–0 El Salvador
    - Mexico 2–1 Trinidad and Tobago
      - Standings: Costa Rica 12, USA 10, Honduras 7, Mexico 6, El Salvador 5, Trinidad&Tobago 2.
- Friendly internationals:
  - Italy 4–3 New Zealand in Atteridgeville, South Africa
  - Estonia 0–0 Portugal
- (Romania) Romanian Liga I, final matchday: (teams in **bold** qualify for the Champions League; teams in italics qualify for Europa League)
  - (5) Craiova 0–1 (8) Vaslui
  - (1) **Unirea Urziceni** 1–1 (6) Steaua București
  - (7) Rapid București 2–2 (14) Poli Iași
    - Final standings: **Unirea Urziceni** (champion) 70 points, **Dinamo București** 65, Timișoara 61, CFR Cluj 59, Vaslui 57, Steaua 56, Craiova 56, Rapid 55, Brașov 55.
      - Vaslui and Steaua clinch the last two berths in Europa League.

==== Rugby union ====
- Lions tour of South Africa:
  - Sharks 3–39 British & Irish Lions in Durban

==== Shooting ====
- ISSF World Cup in Minsk, Belarus: (Qualification scores in parentheses)
  - Men's double trap: (gold) Hu Binyuan (CHN) 196 **WR** (147 **EWR**) (silver) Ronjan Sodhi (IND) 194 (145) (bronze) Vitaly Fokeev (RUS) 190 (142)
    - Hu hit 49 of the 50 targets in the final round, as well as in all three qualification rounds, and raised the world record from 194 to 196.

=== June 9, 2009 (Tuesday) ===
==== Basketball ====
- NBA Finals (seeding in parentheses):
  - Game 3 in Orlando: (E3) Orlando Magic 108, (W1) Los Angeles Lakers 104. **Lakers lead series 2–1.**
    - The Magic set an NBA Finals record by shooting 62.5% from the field.
- EuroBasket Women in Latvia: (teams in **bold** advance to the next round; teams in ~~strike~~ are eliminated)
  - Group A in Liepāja:
    - ~~Ukraine~~ 77–79 **Czech Republic**
    - **Spain** 71–54 **Slovakia**
      - Standings: Spain 6 points, Slovakia 5, Czech Republic 4, Ukraine 3.
  - Group B in Liepāja:
    - **Poland** 60–53 ~~Hungary~~
    - **Greece** 68–70(OT) **Latvia**
      - Standings: Latvia 6 points, Poland 5, Greece 4, Hungary 3.
  - Group C in Valmiera:
    - **Turkey** 65–55 ~~Serbia~~
    - **Lithuania** 52–60 **Russia**
      - Standings: Russia 6 points, Turkey 5, Lithuania 4, Serbia 3.
  - Group D in Valmiera:
    - **Belarus** 58–67 **Italy**
    - **France** 73–70 ~~Israel~~
      - Standings: France 6 points, Italy 5, Belarus 4, Israel 3.
- Turkish League Playoffs Final:
  - Game 3: Fenerbahçe Ülker 91–98(OT) Efes Pilsen. **Fenerbahçe Ülker lead series 2–1.**

==== Cricket ====
- ICC World Twenty20 in England: (teams in **bold** advance to the Super Eight; teams in ~~strike~~ are eliminated)
  - Group B: **Pakistan** 175/5 (20/20 ov); ~~Netherlands~~ 93 (17.3/20 ov) at Lord's, London. **Pakistan win by 82 runs**.
  - Group D: **South Africa** 128/7 (20/20 ov); **New Zealand** 127/5 (20/20 ov) at Lord's, London. **South Africa win by 1 run**.
- ICC Women's World Twenty20 in England:
  - Warm-up matches:
    - South Africa 126/7 (20/20 ov); Pakistan 90 (17.1/20 ov) in King's College Ground, Taunton. **South Africa win by 36 runs**.
    - New Zealand 123/5 (20/20 ov); India 106 (20/20 ov) in Taunton Vale Sports Club Ground, Taunton. **New Zealand win by 17 runs**.
    - Australia 141/5 (20/20 ov); England 137/9 (20/20 ov) in Taunton Vale Sports Club Ground, Taunton. **Australia win by 4 runs**.
    - West Indies 121 (19.5/20 ov); Sri Lanka 81/8 (20/20 ov) in King's College Ground, Taunton. **West Indies win by 40 runs**.

==== Cycling ====
- UCI ProTour:
  - Critérium du Dauphiné Libéré:
    - Stage 3: (1) Niki Terpstra (NED) (Team Milram) 4h 32' 34" (2) Ludovic Turpin (FRA) (Ag2r–La Mondiale) s.t. (3) Yuri Trofimov (RUS) (Bbox Bouygues Telecom) s.t.
      - General classification: (1) Terpstra 10h 23' 45" (2) Rémi Pauriol (FRA) (Cofidis) + 26" (3) Trofimov + 27"

==== Football (soccer) ====
- Friendly internationals:
  - Azerbaijan 0–6 Spain
  - Iraq 1–1 Poland in Cape Town

==== Ice hockey ====
- Stanley Cup Final (seeding in parentheses):
  - Game 6 in Pittsburgh: (E4) Pittsburgh Penguins 2, (W2) Detroit Red Wings 1. **Series tied 3–3.**

=== June 8, 2009 (Monday) ===
==== Basketball ====
- EuroBasket Women in Latvia: (teams in **bold** advance to the next round; teams in ~~strike~~ are eliminated)
  - Group A in Liepāja:
    - **Slovakia** 65–58 Czech Republic
    - **Spain** 85–59 Ukraine
  - Group B in Liepāja:
    - Poland 62–60 **Greece**
    - Hungary 59–76 **Latvia**
  - Group C in Valmiera:
    - Turkey 69–66 **Lithuania**
    - Serbia 37–72 **Russia**
  - Group D in Valmiera:
    - ~~Israel~~ 64–75 **Italy**
    - **France** 63–61(OT) **Belarus**

==== Cricket ====
- ICC World Twenty20 in England: (teams in **bold** advance to the Super Eight; teams in ~~strike~~ are eliminated)
  - Group A: ~~Bangladesh~~ 137/8 (20/20 ov); **Ireland** 138/4 (18.2/20 ov) in Nottingham. **Ireland win by 6 wickets**.
    - **Ireland** and **India** advance to the Super Eight stage.
  - Group C: ~~Australia~~ 159/9 (20/20 ov); **Sri Lanka** 160/4 (19/20 ov) in Nottingham. **Sri Lanka win by 6 wickets**.
    - **Sri Lanka** and **West Indies** advance to the Super Eight stage.
- ICC Women's World Twenty20 in England:
  - Warm-up matches:
    - New Zealand 122/8 (20/20 ov); England 126/3 (18.5/20 ov) in King's College Ground, Taunton. **England win by 7 wickets**.
    - South Africa 118/3 (20/20 ov); v Sri Lanka 92/8 (20/20 ov) in Taunton Vale Sports Club Ground, Taunton. **South Africa win by 26 runs**.
    - Australia v India in Taunton Vale Sports Club Ground, Taunton – Match abandoned without a ball bowled.
    - West Indies 114/4 (14/14 ov); Pakistan 88/6 (14/14 ov) in King's College Ground, Taunton. **West Indies win by 26 runs**.

==== Cycling ====
- UCI ProTour:
  - Critérium du Dauphiné Libéré:
    - Stage 2: (1) Angelo Furlan (ITA) (Lampre–N.G.C.) 5h 35'04" (2) Markus Zberg (SUI) (BMC Racing Team) same time (3) Tom Boonen (BEL) (Quick-Step) s.t.
      - General classification: (1) Cadel Evans (AUS) (Silence–Lotto) 5h 50'40" (2) Alberto Contador (ESP) (Astana) + 8" (3) Alejandro Valverde (ESP) (Caisse d'Epargne) + 23"

==== Shooting ====
- ISSF World Cup in Minsk, Belarus: (Qualification scores in parentheses)
  - Men's skeet: (gold) Anthony Terras (FRA) 146+22 (121) (silver) Heikki Meriluoto (FIN) 146+21 (121) (bronze) Mykola Milchev (UKR) 146+19 (121)

=== June 7, 2009 (Sunday) ===
==== Auto racing ====
- Formula One:
  - Turkish Grand Prix in Istanbul, Turkey:
    - (1) Jenson Button (GBR) (Brawn–Mercedes) 1:26:24 (2) Mark Webber (AUS) (Red Bull–Renault) +6.7 (3) Sebastian Vettel (GER) (Red Bull-Renault) +7.4
      - Drivers' standings (after 7 of 17 races): (1) Button 61 points (2) Rubens Barrichello (BRA) (Brawn-Mercedes) 35 (3) Vettel 29
      - Constructors' standings: (1) Brawn-Mercedes 96 points (2) Red Bull-Renault 56.5 (3) Toyota 32.5
- Sprint Cup Series:
  - Pocono 500 in Long Pond, Pennsylvania
    - (1) Tony Stewart (Indiana) (Stewart Haas Racing) (2) Carl Edwards (Missouri) (Roush Fenway Racing) (3) David Reutimann (Florida) (Michael Waltrip Racing)
      - Drivers' standings (after 14 of 26 races leading into the Chase for the Sprint Cup): (1) Stewart 2043 points (2) Jeff Gordon (California) (Hendrick Motorsports) 1972 (3) Jimmie Johnson (California) (Hendrick Motorsports) 1940

==== Basketball ====
- NBA Finals (seeding in parentheses):
  - Game 2 in Los Angeles: (W1) Los Angeles Lakers 101, (E3) Orlando Magic 96 (OT). **Lakers lead series 2–0.**
- EuroBasket Women in Latvia:
  - Group A in Liepāja:
    - Ukraine 55–77 Slovakia
    - Czech Republic 59–66 Spain
  - Group B in Liepāja:
    - Greece 59–43 Hungary
    - Latvia 86–52 Poland
  - Group C in Valmiera:
    - Lithuania 71–49 Serbia
    - Russia 74–61 Turkey
  - Group D in Valmiera:
    - Belarus 81–76 Israel
    - Italy 61–76 France

==== Cricket ====
- ICC World Twenty20 in England: (teams in **bold** advance to the Super Eight; teams in ~~strike~~ are eliminated)
  - Group B: **England** 185/5 (20/20 ov, Kevin Pietersen 58); Pakistan 137/7 (20.0/20 ov) at The Oval, London. **England win by 48 runs**.
  - Group D: **South Africa** 211/5 (20/20 ov, AB de Villiers 79*); ~~Scotland~~ 81 (15.4/20 ov) at The Oval, London. **South Africa win by 130 runs**, the second-highest winning margin in Twenty20 Internationals history.
    - **England**, **South Africa** and **New Zealand** advance to the Super Eight.

==== Cycling ====
- UCI ProTour:
  - Critérium du Dauphiné Libéré:
    - Stage 1 (ITT): (1) Cadel Evans (AUS) (Lotto–Intermarché) 15 min 36 s (2) Alberto Contador (ESP) (XDS Astana Team) at 0:08s (3) Alejandro Valverde (ESP) (Movistar Team) 0:23.

==== Football (soccer) ====
- 2010 FIFA World Cup Qualifying:
  - 2010 FIFA World Cup qualification (CAF) Third round, matchday 2:
    - Group 1:
      - Cameroon 0–0 Morocco
        - Standings: Gabon 6 points, Togo 3, Morocco, Cameroon 1.
    - Group 2:
      - Nigeria 3–0 Kenya
        - Standings: Tunisia 6 points, Nigeria 4, Mozambique 1, Kenya 0.
    - Group 3:
      - Algeria 3–1 Egypt
        - Standings: Algeria, Zambia 4 points, Rwanda, Egypt 1.
    - Group 4:
      - Benin 1–0 Sudan
      - Mali 0–2 Ghana
        - Standings: Ghana 6 points, Gabon 3, Sudan, Mali 1.
    - Group 5:
      - Guinea 1–2 Ivory Coast
        - Standings: Côte d'Ivoire, Burkina Faso 6 points, Guinea, Malawi 0.
  - 2010 FIFA World Cup qualification (CONMEBOL), matchday 13:
    - Peru 1–2 Ecuador
      - Ecuador get level with Uruguay in 5th place with 17 points.

==== Golf ====
- PGA Tour:
  - Memorial Tournament in Dublin, Ohio:
    - Winner: Tiger Woods (USA) 276 (−12)
      - Woods scores a final round of 7-under-par 65, including birdies on the last two holes, and comes from 4 strokes behind to beat Jim Furyk (USA) by one stroke and win the Memorial Tournament for the fourth time.
- European Tour:
  - Celtic Manor Wales Open in Newport, Wales:
    - Winner: Jeppe Huldahl (DEN) 275 (−9)
      - Huldahl beat Niclas Fasth (SWE) by one stroke to win his first European Tour title.
- LPGA Tour:
  - State Farm Classic in Springfield, Illinois:
    - Winner: In-Kyung Kim (KOR) 271 (−17)
      - Kim beat fellow Korean Se Ri Pak by one stroke for her second LPGA Tour title.

==== Shooting ====
- ISSF World Cup in Minsk, Belarus: (Qualification scores in parentheses)
  - Women's skeet: (gold) Svetlana Demina (RUS) 96 (71) (silver) Caitlin Connor (USA) 95+2 (71) (bronze) Katiuscia Spada (ITA) 95+1 (72)

==== Tennis ====
- French Open in Paris, day 15 (seeding in parentheses):
  - Men's singles Final:
    - **Roger Federer** (SUI) [2] bt Robin Söderling (SWE) [23] 6–1, 7–6(1) 6–4
      - Federer wins the French Open for the first time and equals Pete Sampras' record of 14 Grand Slam men's singles title. He also becomes the sixth man in history to win all four Grand Slam tournaments.

=== June 6, 2009 (Saturday) ===
==== Auto racing ====
- IndyCar Series:
  - Bombardier Learjet 550 in Fort Worth, Texas:
    - (1) Hélio Castroneves (BRA) (Penske Racing) 1:55:16.1670 (2) Ryan Briscoe (AUS) (Penske Racing) +0.3904 (3) Scott Dixon (NZL) (Chip Ganassi Racing) +2.2461
    - Drivers' standings (after 6 of 17 races): (1) Briscoe 199 points (2) Dixon 196 (3) Dario Franchitti (GBR) (Chip Ganassi Racing) 188
- Nationwide Series:
  - Federated Auto Parts 300 in Gladeville, Tennessee
    - (1) Kyle Busch (Nevada) (Joe Gibbs Racing) (2) Brad Keselowski (Michigan) (JR Motorsports) (3) Carl Edwards (Missouri) (Roush Fenway Racing)

==== Basketball ====
- Turkish League Playoffs Final:
  - Game 2: Efes Pilsen 67–70 Fenerbahçe Ülker. **Fenerbahçe Ülker lead series 2–0**.

==== Cricket ====
- ICC World Twenty20 in England:
  - Group A in Nottingham:
    - India 180/5 (20/20 ov); Bangladesh 155/8 (20/20 ov). **India win by 25 runs**.
  - Group C at The Oval, London:
    - Australia 169/7 (20/20 ov); West Indies 172/3 (15.5/20 ov). **West Indies win by 7 wickets**.
  - Group D at The Oval, London:
    - Scotland 89/4 (7/7 ov); New Zealand 90/3 (6/7 ov). **New Zealand win by 7 wickets**.

==== Football (soccer) ====
- 2010 FIFA World Cup qualification: (teams that qualify for 2010 World Cup in **bold**)
  - AFC (Asia) Fourth round, matchday 8 of 10:
    - Group 1:
      - Uzbekistan 0–1 **Japan**
      - Qatar 0–0 **Australia**
        - Japan and Australia become the first teams to qualify for South Africa. They both have 14 points from 6 matches, 7 points ahead of Bahrain in 3rd place. Bahrain will clinch a berth in the playoffs with a draw against either Australia or Uzbekistan, unless Qatar beat Japan, in which case Bahrain need at least 2 points from those matches.
    - Group 2:
      - North Korea 0–0 Iran
      - United Arab Emirates 0–2 **South Korea**
        - South Korea also book their place in South Africa. They lead the group with 14 points from 6 matches, ahead of North Korea with 11 from 7, and Saudi Arabia with 10 from 6. Iran, on 7 points, is also in contention for the 2nd automatic qualifying berth or the 3rd place playoff berth.
  - UEFA (Europe):
    - Group 1:
      - Sweden 0–1 Denmark
      - Albania 1–2 Portugal
        - Denmark lead the group with 16 points, ahead of Hungary with 13 and Portugal with 9.
    - Group 3:
      - Slovakia 7–0 San Marino
        - Slovakia go to the top of the group with 15 points, ahead of Northern Ireland with 13 and Poland with 10.
    - Group 4:
      - Azerbaijan 0–1 Wales
      - Finland 2–1 Liechtenstein
        - Germany and Russia who were idle still lead the group with 16 and 12 points respectively. Finland in 3rd place with 10 points.
    - Group 6:
      - Kazakhstan 0–4 England
      - Belarus 5–1 Andorra
      - Croatia 2–2 Ukraine
        - England score their sixth straight win and have 18 points, 7 ahead of Croatia with 11 points. Belarus climb to 3rd place with 9 points.
    - Group 7:
      - Lithuania 0–1 Romania
      - Serbia 1–0 Austria
        - Serbia lead this group with 15 points, followed by France with 10 and Lithuania with 9.
    - Group 8:
      - Bulgaria 1–1 Republic of Ireland
      - Cyprus 2–2 Montenegro
        - Ireland's draw allows Italy to stay at the top of the group with 14 points, ahead of the Irish with 13 and Bulgaria with 8.
    - Group 9:
      - North Macedonia 0–0 Norway
      - Iceland 1–2 **Netherlands**
        - Netherlands win their sixth straight match, and secure their place in South Africa. Netherlands have 18 points, and lead by 11 from 2nd place Scotland with 7 points and 3 matches remaining.
  - CAF (Africa) Third round, matchday 2 of 6:
    - Group 1:
      - Gabon 3–0 Togo
    - Group 2:
      - Tunisia 2–0 Mozambique
    - Group 3:
      - Zambia 1–0 Rwanda
    - Group 5:
      - Malawi 0–1 Burkina Faso
        - Gabon, Tunisia and Burkina Faso score their second win at this stage, and lead their respective groups with 6 points. Zambia is also on top of their group but only with 4 points.
  - CONMEBOL (South America), matchday 13 of 18:
    - Uruguay 0–4 Brazil
    - Bolivia 0–1 Venezuela
    - Argentina 1–0 Colombia
    - Paraguay 0–2 Chile
      - Standings: Brazil, Paraguay 24 points, Chile 23, Argentina 22, Uruguay 17, Venezuela 16.
  - CONCACAF (North & Central America) Fourth round, matchday 4 of 10:
    - Trinidad and Tobago 2–3 Costa Rica
    - United States 2–1 Honduras
    - El Salvador 2–1 Mexico
      - Costa Rica lead the hexagonal with 12 points from 5 matches, after scoring the first road win for any team in the final stage. Team USA are second on 10 points from 5 matches. El Salvador with 5 points lead the remaining teams, who played just 4 matches, followed by Honduras 4, Mexico 3 and Trinidad&Tobago 2.
- Friendly internationals:
  - Italy 3–0 Northern Ireland
  - South Africa 1–0 Poland

==== Horse racing ====
- English Triple Crown:
  - Epsom Derby in Epsom:
    - (1) Sea the Stars (Jockey: Michael Kinane, Trainer: John Oxx (IRE)) (2) Fame and Glory (Jockey: Seamie Heffernan, Trainer: Aidan O'Brien (IRE)) (3) Masterofthehorse (Jockey: Richard Hughes, Trainer: Aidan O'Brien)
      - Sea the Stars becomes the first horse since Nashwan in 1989 to claim the Guineas-Derby double.
- U.S. Triple Crown:
  - Belmont Stakes in Elmont, New York:
    - (1) Summer Bird (Trainer: Tim Ice, Jockey: Kent Desormeaux) (2) Dunkirk (Trainer: Todd Pletcher, Jockey: John Velazquez) (3) Mine That Bird (Trainer: Chip Woolley, Jockey: Calvin Borel)

==== Ice hockey ====
- Stanley Cup Final (seeding in parentheses):
  - Game 5 in Detroit: (W2) Detroit Red Wings 5, (E4) Pittsburgh Penguins 0. **Red Wings lead series 3–2.**

==== Rugby union ====
- Mid-year test series:
  - Australia 55–7 Barbarians in Sydney
  - England 37–15 Argentina in Trafford, Greater Manchester
  - United States 15–48 Wales in Bridgeview, Illinois
- Lions tour of South Africa:
  - Free State Cheetahs 24–26 British & Irish Lions in Bloemfontein
- French Top 14 Final in Saint-Denis:
  - **Perpignan** 22–13 Clermont
    - Perpignan win the championship for the seventh time, after a break of 54 years since the previous one. Clermont are still waiting for their first title after 10 appearances in the final.

==== Tennis ====
- French Open in Paris, day 14 (seeding in parentheses):
  - Women's singles Final:
    - **Svetlana Kuznetsova** (RUS) [7] bt Dinara Safina (RUS) [1] 6–4, 6–2
      - Kuznetsova wins her second Grand Slam title after 2004 US Open, and hands the world #1 her second successive loss in the French Open final.
  - Men's doubles Final:
    - **Lukáš Dlouhý** (CZE)/**Leander Paes** (IND) [3] v. Wesley Moodie (RSA)/Dick Norman (BEL) 3–6, 6–3, 6–2
      - This is the fifth Grand Slam men's doubles title for Paes (he also has four mixed doubles titles), but only the first for Dlouhý.

=== June 5, 2009 (Friday) ===
==== Cricket ====
- ICC World Twenty20 in England:
  - Group B at Lord's, London:
    - England 162/5 (20/20 ov, Luke Wright 71); Netherlands 163/6 (20.0/20 ov). **Netherlands win by 4 wickets**.

==== Tennis ====
- French Open in Paris, day 13 (seeding in parentheses):
  - Men's singles Semifinals:
    - Roger Federer (SUI) [2] bt Juan Martín del Potro (ARG) [5] 3–6, 7–6(2), 2–6, 6–1, 6–4
      - Federer advances to his 19th career Grand Slam final, and will be aiming to equal Pete Sampras' record of 14 titles. He is also through to his fourth successive French Open final, the only Grand Slam event he has yet to win.
    - Robin Söderling (SWE) [23] bt Fernando González (CHI) [12] 6–3, 7–5, 5–7, 4–6, 6–4
  - Women's doubles Final:
    - **Anabel Medina Garrigues** (ESP)/**Virginia Ruano Pascual** (ESP) [3] bt Victoria Azarenka (BLR)/Elena Vesnina (RUS) [12] 6–1 6–1
      - Medina Garrigues and Ruano Pascual repeat their victory last year. For Ruano Pascual, this is the 6th French Open crown and the 10th Grand Slam title. Her first eight titles were with former partner Paola Suárez.

=== June 4, 2009 (Thursday) ===
==== Baseball ====
- Randy Johnson becomes the 24th Major League Baseball pitcher to collect his 300th win, throwing six innings for the San Francisco Giants in their 5–1 win over the Washington Nationals.

==== Basketball ====
- NBA Finals (seeding in parentheses):
  - Game 1 in Los Angeles: (W1) Los Angeles Lakers 100, (E3) Orlando Magic 75. **Lakers lead series 1–0.**
    - Kobe Bryant scores a career Finals high of 40 points to blow the tightly contested game wide open on the second quarter.
- Turkish League Playoffs Final:
  - Game 1: Efes Pilsen 60–68 Fenerbahçe Ülker. **Fenerbahçe Ülker lead series 1–0.**

==== Ice hockey ====
- Stanley Cup Final (seeding in parentheses):
  - Game 4 in Pittsburgh: (E4) Pittsburgh Penguins 4, (W2) Detroit Red Wings 2. **Series tied 2–2.**

==== Tennis ====
- French Open in Paris, day 12 (seeding in parentheses):
  - Women's singles Semifinals:
    - Dinara Safina (RUS) [1] bt Dominika Cibulková (SVK) [20] 6–3, 6–3
      - Safina reaches her third Grand Slam singles final, after last year's French Open and this year's Australian Open, which she both lost.
    - Svetlana Kuznetsova (RUS) [7] bt Samantha Stosur (AUS) [30] 6–4, 6–7 (5/7), 6–3
      - Kuznetsova is through to her fourth Grand Slam final, and the second final of the French Open. Her only Grand Slam title so far was the 2004 U.S. Open.
  - Mixed doubles Final:
    - **Liezel Huber** (USA)/**Bob Bryan** (USA) [1] bt Vania King (USA)/Marcelo Melo (BRA) 5–7, 7–6 (7/5), 1–0 (10/7)
      - Bryan wins his second straight French Open and sixth Grand Slam mixed doubles title. He also has two French Open and seven grand slam titles in men's doubles with twin brother Mike. Huber wins her first Grand Slam title in mixed doubles

=== June 3, 2009 (Wednesday) ===
==== Auto racing ====
- Tony Stewart's annual fund raising event at Eldora Speedway, the Prelude to the Dream, was postponed until September 9 due to rain.

==== Cricket ====
- ICC World Twenty20 in England:
  - Warm-up matches:
    - Sri Lanka 109/9 (20/20 ov); South Africa 113/4 (19.1/20 ov) at Lord's, London. **South Africa win by 6 wickets**.
    - Scotland 128/9 (20/20 ov); Netherlands 130/3 (19.3/20 ov) at The Oval, London. **Netherlands win by 7 wickets**.
    - West Indies 144/6 (20/20 ov); England 145/1 (14.4/20 ov) at Lord's, London. **England win by 9 wickets**.
    - Pakistan 158/6 (20/20 ov); India 159/1 (17/20 ov) at The Oval, London. **India win by 9 wickets**.

==== Football (soccer) ====
- 2010 FIFA World Cup qualification (CONCACAF) Fourth round, matchday 5:
  - Costa Rica 3–1 United States
    - Costa Rica go to the top of the hexagonal group with 9 points from 4 matches, 2 ahead of USA.

==== Rugby league ====
- State of Origin Series:
  - Game 1 in Melbourne: Queensland 28–18 New South Wales. **Queensland lead series 1–0.**

==== Rugby union ====
- Lions tour of South Africa:
  - Golden Lions 10–74 British & Irish Lions in Johannesburg

==== Tennis ====
- French Open in Paris, day 11 (seeding in parentheses):
  - Men's singles, quarterfinals:
    - Roger Federer (SUI) [2] bt Gaël Monfils (FRA) [11] 7–6(6), 6–2, 6–4
    - Juan Martín del Potro (ARG) [5] bt Tommy Robredo (ESP) [16] 6–3, 6–4, 6–2
  - Women's singles, quarterfinals:
    - Svetlana Kuznetsova (RUS) [7] bt Serena Williams (USA) [2] 7–6(3), 5–7, 7–5
    - Samantha Stosur (AUS) [30] bt Sorana Cîrstea (ROU) 6–1, 6–3

=== June 2, 2009 (Tuesday) ===
==== Cricket ====
- ICC World Twenty20 in England:
  - Warm-up matches:
    - Ireland 130/7 (20/20 ov); West Indies 134/1 (16/20 ov) at The Oval, London. **West Indies win by 9 wickets**.
    - Bangladesh 151/6 (20/20 ov); Sri Lanka 152/6 (19.4/20 ov) in Nottingham. **Sri Lanka win by 4 wickets**.
    - New Zealand 147 (19.5/20 ov); Australia 151/3 (19.2/20 ov) at The Oval, London. **Australia win by 7 wickets**.
    - Scotland 136/5 (20/20 ov); England 141/4 (19/20 ov) in Nottingham. **England win by 6 wickets**.

==== Football (soccer) ====
- Friendly internationals:
  - France 0–1 Nigeria in Saint-Étienne
  - United Arab Emirates 2–7 Germany in Dubai
    - Mario Gómez scores 4 goals for Germany.
  - Turkey 2–0 Azerbaijan in Kayseri

==== Ice hockey ====
- Stanley Cup Final (seeding in parentheses):
  - Game 3 in Pittsburgh: (E4) Pittsburgh Penguins 4, (W2) Detroit Red Wings 2. **Red Wings lead series 2–1.**

==== Tennis ====
- French Open in Paris, day 10: (seeding in parentheses)
  - Men's singles, quarterfinals:
    - Fernando González (CHI) [12] bt Andy Murray (GBR) [3] 6–3, 3–6, 6–0, 6–4
    - Robin Söderling (SWE) [23] bt Nikolay Davydenko (RUS) [10] 6–1, 6–3, 6–1
  - Women's singles, quarterfinals:
    - Dinara Safina (RUS) [1] bt Victoria Azarenka (BLR) [9] 1–6, 6–4, 6–2
    - Dominika Cibulková (SVK) [20] bt Maria Sharapova (RUS) 6–0, 6–2

=== June 1, 2009 (Monday) ===
==== Basketball ====
- (Greece) A1 Ethniki Playoff Final:
  - Game 4: Panathinaikos 94–81 Olympiacos Piraeus. **Panathinaikos win best-of-5 series 3–1.**
    - Panathinaikos win the championship for the 7th successive year, and the 29th time in their history.

==== Cricket ====
- ICC World Twenty20 in England:
  - Warm-up matches:
    - Australia 219/6 (20/20 ov); Bangladesh 181/7 (20/20 ov) in Nottingham. **Australia win by 38 runs**.
    - Netherlands 135/9 (20/20 ov); Ireland 135/7 (20/20 ov) at Lord's, London. **Match tied (Ireland win the one-over eliminator)**.
    - South Africa 186/7 (20/20 ov) v. Pakistan 127 (19.4/20 ov) in Nottingham. **South Africa win by 59 runs.**
    - New Zealand 170/7 (20/20 ov) v. India 161/6 (20/20 ov) at Lord's, London. **New Zealand win by 9 runs.**

==== Football (soccer) ====
- European domestic (national) competitions: (listed by countries' alphabetic order; league standings prior to match in parentheses; teams that win titles in **bold**; teams that qualify to the Champions League in italics)
  - (Israel) Israeli Premier League, final matchday:
    - (1) **Maccabi Haifa** 1–1 (3) Beitar Jerusalem
      - Final standings: **Maccabi Haifa** 67 points, Hapoel Tel Aviv 61, Beitar Jerusalem 57, Maccabi Netania 54, Bnei Yehuda 49.
      - Haifa qualify to the Champions League second qualifying round. Hapoel TA, Netania and Bnei Yehuda will play in Europa League (Beitar is ineligible).

==== Tennis ====
- French Open in Paris, day 9: (seeding in parentheses)
  - Men's singles, round of 16:
    - Roger Federer (SUI) [2] bt Tommy Haas (GER) 6–7 (4/7), 5–7, 6–4, 6–0, 6–2
    - Juan Martín del Potro (ARG) [5] bt Jo-Wilfried Tsonga (FRA) [9] 6–1, 6–7 (5/7), 6–1, 6–4
    - Gaël Monfils (FRA) [11] bt Andy Roddick (USA) [6] 6–4, 6–2, 6–3
    - Tommy Robredo (ESP) [16] bt Philipp Kohlschreiber (GER) [29] 6–4, 5–7, 7–6 (7/4), 6–2
  - Women's singles, round of 16:
    - Serena Williams (USA) [2] bt Aleksandra Wozniak (CAN) [24] 6–1, 6–2
    - Sorana Cîrstea (ROU) bt Jelena Janković (SRB) [5] 3–6, 6–0, 9–7
    - Svetlana Kuznetsova (RUS) [7] bt Agnieszka Radwańska (POL) [12] 6–4, 1–6, 6–1
    - Samantha Stosur (AUS) [30] bt Virginie Razzano (FRA) 6–1, 6–2
