= 2009 Belmont Stakes =

American horse race

141st Belmont Stakes
- Belmont Stakes
- Location: Belmont Park; Elmont, New York, U.S.
- Date: June 6, 2009
- Distance: 1 1/2 mi (12 furlongs; 2,414 m)
- Winning horse: Summer Bird
- Winning time: 2:27.54
- Final odds: 11.90 (to 1)
- Jockey: Kent Desormeaux
- Trainer: Tim Ice
- Owner: Kalarikkal K. & Vilasini D. Jayaraman
- Conditions: Fast
- Surface: Dirt

The 2009 Belmont Stakes was the 141st running of the Belmont Stakes. The race took place on June 6, 2009, and was televised on ABC and ESPN360. The value of the race was $1,000,000 in stakes. Post time was 6:19 p.m. EST. As the final jewel in the Triple Crown, this year's event was run without the elusive championship at stake as 2009 Kentucky Derby winner Mine That Bird was defeated in the Preakness. The attendance at Belmont Park was 52,861.

Summer Bird closed stoutly in the stretch and was victorious over Dunkirk and Mine That Bird, who battled on for the minor placings.

== Pre-race announcements ==
After winning the Preakness, connections of winner Rachel Alexandra were not committed to the race. With a week before the race they decided not to enter the filly.

Among the possible challengers to Mine That Bird are Summer Bird, who shares the same sire—Birdstone, and Chocolate Candy, Dunkirk, Flying Private, Brave Victory, Charitable Man, Luv Gov, Miner’s Escape, Mr. Hot Stuff and Nowhere To Hide.

== Results ==
Results	Post	Horse	Stakes
Win	4	Summer Bird	$600,000
Place	2	Dunkirk	$200,000
Show	7	Mine That Bird	$100,000
Fourth	6	Charitable Man	$50,000
Fifth	5	Luv Gov	$30,000

- Margins – 2¾ lengths, Neck
- Time – 2:27.54
- Track – Fast
- All other runners received $4,000 in stakes
- There was an inquiry filed by Charitable Man’s jockey Alan Garcia against Dunkirk for interference, but it was disallowed by the racing stewards

== Payout ==
$2 prices:

Post	Horse	Win	Place	Show
4	Summer Bird	$25.40	$9.30	$4.70
2	Dunkirk		$5.40	$3.60
7	Mine That Bird			$2.60

- $1 Exacta (4-2): $121.00
- $1 Trifecta (4-2-7): $295.00
- $1 Superfecta (4-2-7-6): $852.00

== The Field ==
The draw for The Belmont Stakes was done on Wednesday, June 3, 2009. Mine That Bird was made the morning line 2-1 favorite and tried to become the 61st favorite to win and the first since Afleet Alex in 2005.

Post	Horse name	Trainer	Jockey	Opening Odds	Starting Odds	Finishing Pos.
1	Chocolate Candy	Jerry Hollendorfer	Garrett Gomez	10-1	9.50	9
2	Dunkirk	Todd Pletcher	John Velazquez	4-1	4.60	2
3	Mr. Hot Stuff	Eoin Harty	Edgar Prado	15-1	22.60	8
4	Summer Bird	Tim Ice	Kent Desormeaux	12-1	11.90	1
5	Luv Gov	D. Wayne Lukas	Miguel Mena	20-1	22.40	5
6	Charitable Man	Kiaran McLaughlin	Alan Garcia	3-1	4.60	4
7	Mine That Bird	Bennie L. Woolley, Jr.	Calvin Borel	2-1	1.25	3
8	Flying Private	D. Wayne Lukas	Julien Leparoux	12-1	17.30	6
9	Miner's Escape	Nick Zito	Jose Lezcano	15-1	22.00	10
10	Brave Victory	Nick Zito	Rajiv Maragh	15-1	27.50	7

== Performance ==
- Winner Summer Bird never ran as a 2YO
- First graded stakes victory for winning trainer Tim Ice
- Attendance at Belmont Park dropped 44% from 2008 due to no Triple Crown contender
- Second placed Dunkirk sustained a non-displaced condylar fracture of the left hind cannon bone.
