= Dunkirk (American horse) =

American-bred Thoroughbred racehorse

- Sire: Unbridled's Song
- Grandsire: Unbridled
- Dam: Secret Status
- Damsire: A.P. Indy
- Sex: Stallion
- Foaled: January 23, 2006
- Country: United States
- Colour: Gray
- Breeder: W.S. Farish, James Elkins & W.T. Webber, Jr.
- Owner: Mrs. John Magnier, Michael Tabor, Derrick Smith. Racing Colors: Blue, blue cap.
- Trainer: Todd Pletcher
- Record: 5:2-2-0
- Earnings: $350,000

Dunkirk is an American Thoroughbred Racehorse born in 2006. He is the son of graded stakes winner and major sire Unbridled's Song and multiple Grade 1 winner Secret Status. He is owned by a syndicate composed of John Magnier, Derrick Smith, and Michael Tabor and trained by Todd Pletcher during his short racing career. Dunkirk acquired a measure of celebrity during the 2007 Keeneland Yearling Auction, where he sold for $3.7million.

Unraced at 2, he broke his maiden at age 3 in 2009 at first asking at Gulfstream Park. He followed that win with an Allowance victory, also at Gulfstream Park. He then placed second in the Florida Derby, a race in which victorious Quality Road set a new track record.

In the 2009 Kentucky Derby, Dunkirk finished 11th after stumbling badly at the beginning. This was the first time he had failed to finish in the top two. He then skipped the mid-May Preakness Stakes and aimed for the Belmont Stakes in early June at Belmont Park.

After setting a fast pace for the first 6 furlongs, Dunkirk was overtaken in the stretch but fought back to finish 2nd behind eventual 3-year old champion Summer Bird, beating the Kentucky Derby winner, Mine That Bird. After the race, it was discovered that Dunkirk had suffered a condylar fracture in his left hind cannon bone. After a successful surgery, Dunkirk was expected to return to racing in 2010 at age 4, but he instead was retired to stand stud at Ashford Stud in Kentucky. In 2014, he was sold to the Japan Race Horse Agency and would stand at East Stud from the 2015 breeding season onwards. He was pensioned in 2024 and moved to Yogibo Versailles Resort Farm.

== Pedigree ==
Dunkirk's sire and dam are both Grade 1 Stakes winners, and both of his grandsires are Triple Crown race winners (Unbridled won the 1990 Kentucky Derby; A.P. Indy won the 1992 Belmont Stakes).

Pedigree of Dunkirk
Sire Unbridled's Song	Unbridled	Fappiano	Mr. Prospector
Sire Unbridled's Song	Unbridled	Fappiano	Killaloe
Sire Unbridled's Song	Unbridled	Gana Facil	Le Fabuleux
Sire Unbridled's Song	Unbridled	Gana Facil	Charedi
Sire Unbridled's Song	Trolley Song	Caro	Fortino
Sire Unbridled's Song	Trolley Song	Caro	Chambord
Sire Unbridled's Song	Trolley Song	Lucky Spell	Lucky Mel
Sire Unbridled's Song	Trolley Song	Lucky Spell	Incantation
Dam Secret Status	A.P. Indy	Seattle Slew	Bold Reasoning
Dam Secret Status	A.P. Indy	Seattle Slew	My Charmer
Dam Secret Status	A.P. Indy	Weekend Surprise	Secretariat
Dam Secret Status	A.P. Indy	Weekend Surprise	Lassie Dear
Dam Secret Status	Private Status	Alydar	Raise a Native
Dam Secret Status	Private Status	Alydar	Sweet Tooth
Dam Secret Status	Private Status	Miss Eva	Con Brio
Dam Secret Status	Private Status	Miss Eva	Apolinea
