= 2009 ACB Playoffs =

The 2009 ACB Playoffs was the final phase of the 2008–09 ACB season. It started on Saturday, May 16, 2009 and run until Thursday, June 18, 2009.

Quarter Finals
1	TAU Cerámica	2
8	iurbentia Bilbao	0
4	Real Madrid	2
5	DKV Joventut	1
2	Regal Barcelona	2
7	Pamesa Valencia	0
3	Unicaja	2
6	Kalise Gran Canaria	1

SemiFinals
1	TAU Cerámica	2
4	Real Madrid	1
2	Regal Barcelona	2
3	Unicaja	1

Finals
1	TAU Cerámica	1
2	Regal Barcelona	3

== Quarterfinals ==
The quarterfinals were best-of-3 series.

=== TAU Cerámica vs. iurbentia Bilbao ===
17 May
12:30 CEST

Report

TAU Cerámica	90–86	iurbentia Bilbao
Scoring by quarter: 23-18, 20-38, 21-11, 26-19
Pts: Rakočević 18; Rebs: Splitter 10; Asts: Splitter, Vidal 5		Pts: three players 15; Rebs: three players 5 Asts: Salgado 9
1-0

Fernando Buesa Arena
Attendance: 9,700
Referees: Amorós, García, Peruga

19 May
20:15 CEST

Report

iurbentia Bilbao	76–97	TAU Cerámica
Scoring by quarter: 25-20, 20-27, 11-26, 20-24
Pts: Recker 19; Rebs: Banić 7 Asts: Blūms 5		Pts: Rakočević 23; Rebs: McDonald 10; Asts: Rakočević, Prigioni 4
0-2

Bizkaia Arena
Attendance: 10,500
Referees: J.A. Martín Bertrán, Oscar Perea, Lluis Guirao

TAU Cerámica wins the series 2–0

=== Regal Barcelona vs. Pamesa Valencia ===
17 May
12:30 CEST

Report

Regal Barcelona	68–66	Pamesa Valencia
Scoring by quarter: 28-13, 18-17, 15-20, 7-16
Pts: Vázquez 18; Rebs: three players 7 Asts: Lakovič 5		Pts: Oliver, Perović 14; Rebs: three players 6 Asts: Oliver, Nielsen 4
1-0

Palau Blaugrana
Attendance: 4,325
Referees: E. Pérez Pizarro, Antonio Conde, José Javier Murgui

19 May
20:45 CEST

Report

Pamesa Valencia	55–81	Regal Barcelona
Scoring by quarter: 14-27, 10-26, 16-21, 15-7
Pts: Gregory, Perović 11; Rebs: Miralles 7 Asts: Piétrus, Nielsen 2		Pts: Andersen 21; Rebs: Bartoň 7 Asts: Navarro 6
0-2

Fuente San Luis
Attendance: 8,900
Referees: Juan Carlos Arteaga, Vicente Bultó, Francisco J. Araña

Regal Barcelona wins the series 2–0

=== Unicaja vs. Kalise Gran Canaria ===
17 May
12:30 CEST

Report

Unicaja Málaga	90–96 (OT)	Kalise Gran Canaria
Scoring by quarter: 16-22, 21-13, 17-17, 20-22, Overtime: 16-22
Pts: Cook 25; Rebs: N'Dong 6 Asts: Rodríguez 6		Pts: Sanders 17; Rebs: Augustine 13; Asts: Savané 5
0-1

Jose Maria Martin Carpena Arena
Attendance: 10,000
Referees: M.A. Pérez Pérez, Redondo, J.J. Martínez Díez

19 May
19:30 WEST

Report

Kalise Gran Canaria	68–70	Unicaja Málaga
Scoring by quarter: 20-19, 16-12, 20-22, 12-17
Pts: Fisher 16; Rebs: Freeland 9 Asts: Fernández 4		Pts: N'Dong 17; Rebs: N'Dong 11; Asts: Cook, Joseph Gomis 3
1-1

Centro Insular de Deportes
Attendance: 5,200
Referees: Juan Carlos Mitjana, Antonio Conde, José Javier Murgui

24 May
12:30 CEST

Report

Unicaja Málaga	88–57	Kalise Gran Canaria
Scoring by quarter: 15-13, 24-18, 25-7, 24-19
Pts: Kelati 18; Rebs: Archibald, Haislip 7 Asts: Cook 6		Pts: Freeland 12; Rebs: Augustine, Savané 7 Asts: Norris, Moran 2
2-1

Jose Maria Martin Carpena Arena
Attendance: 10,000
Referees: Fco. De La Maza, E. Pérez Pizarro, Vicente Bultó

Unicaja wins the series 2–1

=== Real Madrid vs. DKV Joventut ===
16 May
18:15 CEST

Report

Real Madrid	79–62	DKV Joventut
Scoring by quarter: 18-13, 29-10, 18-18, 14-21
Pts: Bullock 14; Rebs: Reyes, Winston 8 Asts: López 8		Pts: Ribas 12; Rebs: Hernández-Sonseca 11; Asts: Ribas, Mallet 3
1-0

Palacio Vistalegre
Attendance: 7,100
Referees: Fco. De La Maza, Oscar Perea, C Sánchez Monserrat

18 May
20:15 CEST

Report

DKV Joventut	82–77	Real Madrid
Scoring by quarter: 18-22, 30-22, 19-17, 15-16
Pts: three players 16; Rebs: Bogdanović 8 Asts: Rubio 6		Pts: Bullock 22; Rebs: Reyes 10; Asts: López 6
1-1

Palau Municipal d'Esports de Badalona
Attendance: 9,828
Referees: Daniel Hierrezuelo, J.C García González, Jiménez Trujillo

23 May
18:15 CEST

Report

Real Madrid	78–61	DKV Joventut
Scoring by quarter: 19-14, 25-14, 17-16, 17-17
Pts: Reyes 16; Rebs: Hervelle 10; Asts: Bullock 5		Pts: Bogdanović 20; Rebs: four players 4 Asts: three players 3
2-1

Palacio Vistalegre
Attendance: 12,100
Referees: Juan Carlos Arteaga, M.A. Pérez Pérez, Francisco J. Araña

Real Madrid wins the series 2–1

== Semifinals ==
The semifinals were best-of-3 series.

=== TAU Cerámica vs. Real Madrid ===
30 May
18:15 CEST

Report

TAU Cerámica	91–80	Real Madrid
Scoring by quarter: 26-19, 18-19, 23-17, 24-25
Pts: Rakočević 23; Rebs: Splitter 12; Asts: Prigioni 10		Pts: Mumbrú, Bullock 15; Rebs: Van Den Spiegel, Hervelle 8 Asts: Bullock 7
1-0

Fernando Buesa Arena
Attendance: 9,400
Referees: Juan Carlos Arteaga, J.A. Martín Bertrán, Jiménez Trujillo

4 June
20:15 CEST

Report

Real Madrid	102–82	TAU Cerámica
Scoring by quarter: 22-18, 22-16, 35-19, 23-29
Pts: Reyes 18; Rebs: Mumbrú 8 Asts: López 5		Pts: Vidal 21; Rebs: McDonald 5 Asts: Prigioni 4
1-1

Palacio Vistalegre
Attendance: 11,500
Referees: Daniel Hierrezuelo, E. Pérez Pizarro, Oscar Perea

6 June
18:15 CEST

Report

TAU Cerámica	89–80	Real Madrid
Scoring by quarter: 20-20, 15-17, 29-18, 25-25
Pts: Teletović 22; Rebs: Splitter, Teletović 9 Asts: Splitter 5		Pts: Mumbrú 17; Rebs: Reyes 7 Asts: three players 4
2-1

Fernando Buesa Arena
Attendance: 9,450
Referees: Juan Carlos Arteaga, Daniel Hierrezuelo, Oscar Perea

TAU Cerámica wins the series 2–1

=== Regal Barcelona vs. Unicaja ===
31 May
12:30 CEST

Report

Regal Barcelona	70–62	Unicaja
Scoring by quarter: 17-7, 9-21, 21-20, 23-14
Pts: Lakovič 14; Rebs: Andersen 12; Asts: Lakovič, Andersen 3		Pts: Cabezas 15; Rebs: Jiménez 9 Asts: Cook 4
1-0

Palau Blaugrana
Attendance: 4,821
Referees: Juan Carlos Mitjana, Daniel Hierrezuelo, Redondo

5 June
20:45 CEST

Report

Unicaja	82–75	Regal Barcelona
Scoring by quarter: 24-18, 19-25, 24-13, 15-19
Pts: N'Dong 20; Rebs: N'Dong 9 Asts: three players 2		Pts: Navarro 26; Rebs: Andersen 7 Asts: Navarro 6
1-1

Jose Maria Martin Carpena Arena
Attendance: 10,000
Referees: Xavier Amorós, M.A. Pérez Pérez, J.C García González

7 June
19:00 CEST

Report

Regal Barcelona	86–78 (OT)	Unicaja
Scoring by quarter: 23-19, 22-19, 14-19, 13-15, Overtime: 14-6
Pts: Navarro 18; Rebs: Vázquez 9 Asts: Sada 5		Pts: Cabezas 15; Rebs: Jiménez 9 Asts: Gomis, Welsch 3
2-1

Palau Blaugrana
Attendance: 6,027
Referees: Fco. De La Maza, J.A. Martín Bertrán, Jiménez Trujillo

Regal Barcelona wins the series 2–1

== ACB finals ==
The finals are a best-of-5 series.

=== TAU Cerámica vs. Regal Barcelona ===
11 June
20:15 CEST

Report

TAU Cerámica	80–82	Regal Barcelona
Scoring by quarter: 21-15, 16-28, 19-16, 24-23
Pts: Rakočević 19; Rebs: Splitter 10; Asts: Rakočević 4		Pts: Andersen 21; Rebs: Vázquez 6 Asts: Navarro 8
0-1

Fernando Buesa Arena
Attendance: 9,500
Referees: D. Hierrezuelo, J.A. Martín Bertrán, Redondo

13 June
18:15 CEST

Report

TAU Cerámica	75–67	Regal Barcelona
Scoring by quarter: 20-12, 13-21, 21-16, 21-18
Pts: Rakočević 22; Rebs: Mickeal 9 Asts: Rakočević 4		Pts: Navarro 21; Rebs: Andersen 9 Asts: Andersen, Sada 3
1-1

Fernando Buesa Arena
Attendance: 9,600
Referees: J.C. Arteaga, F. de la Maza, E. Pérez Pizarro

16 June
20:15 CEST

Report

Regal Barcelona	85–67	TAU Cerámica
Scoring by quarter: 17-18, 23-15, 20-16, 25-18
Pts: İlyasova, Basile 21; Rebs: İlyasova 9 Asts: Navarro 5		Pts: Prigioni 12; Rebs: Splitter, Mickeal 6 Asts: Prigioni 2
2-1

Palau Blaugrana
Attendance: 7,213
Referees: D. Hierrezuelo, E. Pérez Pizarro, Jiménez Trujillo

18 June
20:15 CEST

Report

Regal Barcelona	90–77	TAU Cerámica
Scoring by quarter: 27-18, 16-15, 28-27, 19-17
Pts: Navarro 19; Rebs: İlyasova 6 Asts: Navarro 9		Pts: Rakočević 20; Rebs: Splitter 8 Asts: Rakočević 5
3-1

Palau Blaugrana
Attendance: 7,716
Referees: Juan Carlos Arteaga, Daniel Hierrezuelo, Redondo

ACB Finals MVP: (Spain) Juan Carlos Navarro

2009 ACB League
FC Barcelona
15th Title
