= Tim Ice =

American horse trainer

Personal information
- Born: June 6, 1974 (age 52) East Liverpool, Ohio, U.S.
- Occupation: Trainer

Horse racing career
- Sport: Horse racing
- Career wins: 159+ (ongoing)

Major racing wins
- Belmont Stakes (2009); Travers Stakes (2009); Jockey Club Gold Cup (2009)

Significant horses
- Summer Bird

Tim A. Ice (born June 6, 1974, in East Liverpool, Ohio) is an American Thoroughbred horse racing trainer. While in his early teens his family moved to Louisiana where he lived near Louisiana Downs in Bossier City where he now makes his home. However, Tim Ice began his career in racing at tracks in the American Midwest. He worked as an assistant to Keith Desormeaux for five years throughout the midwest. After a short hiatus he then worked for Cole Norman in Louisiana and Arkansas. He followed that with two years under Morris Nicks.

2009 marked the first time Tim Ice was on his own and he earned his first stakes win with Affirmed Truth in the March 28 Rainbow Miss Stakes at Oaklawn Park. By far his greatest success came with the three-year-old colt Summer Bird who won four of his nine starts and earned $2,323,040. In the third leg of the 2009 U.S. Triple Crown series, on his 35th birthday Tim Ice won the Belmont Stakes with Summer Bird. The colt went on to win two more Grade 1 races, the Travers Stakes and Jockey Club Gold Cup, and was voted the American Champion Three-Year-Old Male Horse of 2009.

Off to a slow start in 2010, on February 9, owners K.K. and Vilasini Jayaraman decided to transfer their stable from Tim Ice to other trainers. Summer Bird, along with five other horses, were sent to trainer Tim Ritchey.
