= Summer Bird =

American-bred Thoroughbred racehorse

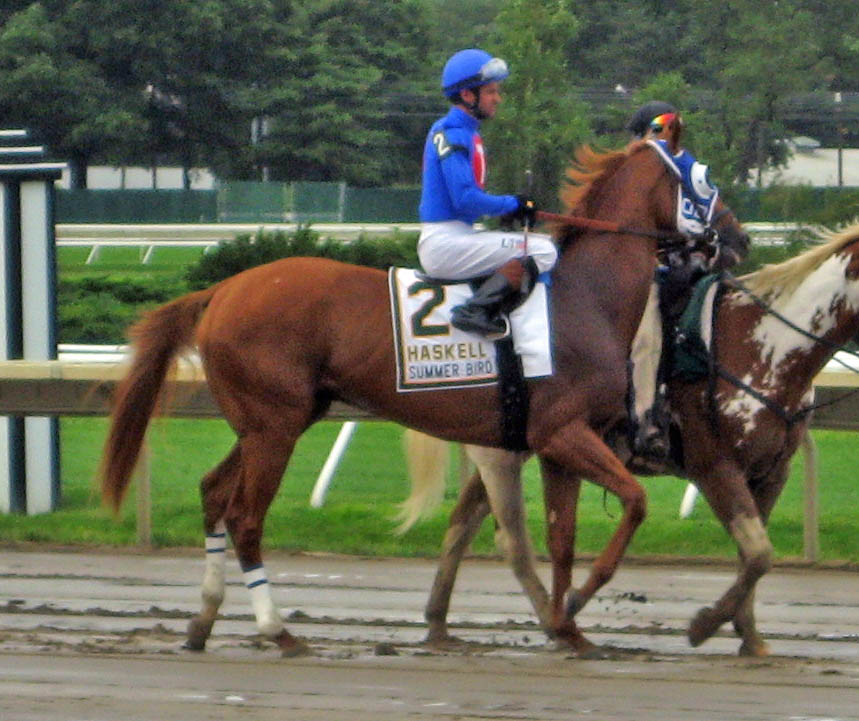
- Summer Bird (2009 Haskell Invitational post parade)
- Sire: Birdstone
- Grandsire: Grindstone
- Dam: Hong Kong Squall
- Damsire: Summer Squall
- Sex: Stallion
- Foaled: April 7, 2006
- Died: December 23, 2013 (aged 7)
- Country: United States
- Colour: Chestnut
- Breeder: Kalarikkal K. & Vilasini D. Jayaraman
- Owner: Kalarikkal K. & Vilasini D. Jayaraman
- Trainer: 1) Tim A. Ice; 2) Timothy F. Ritchey
- Record: 8:4-1-1
- Earnings: $1,573,040

Major wins
- Travers Stakes (2009); Jockey Club Gold Cup (2009); Triple Crown race wins: Belmont Stakes (2009)

Awards
- American Champion Three-Year-Old Male Horse (2009)

Summer Bird (April 7, 2006 – December 23, 2013) was a champion American Thoroughbred racehorse, son of 2004 Belmont Stakes winner Birdstone. He was bred by retired cardiologist Kalarikkal Jayaraman and his wife, retired pathologist Vilasini Jayaraman, at their Tiffany Farm near Ocala, Florida. On June 3, 2010, Summer Bird was retired due to complications of a previous injury.

== Belmont Stakes ==
Raced by his breeders, Summer Bird won the 2009 Belmont Stakes, the third leg of the U.S. Triple Crown, in which Kentucky Derby winner and Preakness Stakes runner-up Mine That Bird was favored. The win was the second of his five-start career, and followed a third in the Arkansas Derby and a sixth in the Kentucky Derby. After the Belmont, he was sent to Monmouth Park, New Jersey, to prep for the Haskell Invitational. He finished second in that race to champion female Rachel Alexandra.

== Travers Stakes ==
Summer Bird was then taken to Saratoga Race Course to compete in the prestigious Travers Stakes. Mine That Bird was also entered, and Rachel Alexandra was a possible contender. Both horses were taken out of the race, though, Mine That Bird because of throat surgery and Rachel Alexandra because she was entered in the Woodward Stakes against older males the week after the Travers. Summer Bird took the lead in the Travers over Kensei at the quarter pole and held off a late closing longshot, Hold Me Back, to win and earn his second Grade 1 victory on a sloppy track. Quality Road finished third. Summer Bird also won the Jockey Club Gold Cup at Belmont on October 3, 2009. He was the first horse in over 20 years to win all three prestigious races in New York. He then finished fourth in the Breeders' Cup Classic behind champion mare Zenyatta at Santa Anita Park on November 7, 2009, as the third betting choice at 6–1. He won the Eclipse Award for male three-year-olds in 2009. He was being pointed towards the Japan Cup Dirt, but during a recent workout he showed signs of distress and pulled up lame. He did not race in the Japan Cup, due to a condylar fracture in his right foreleg.

On February 9, 2010, owners K.K. and Vilasini Jayaraman transferred Summer Bird, along with five other horses, to trainer Tim Ritchey. Although the colt underwent rehabilitation for his injury, he did not return to the races.

== Stud career ==
Summer Bird was retired to stud in 2011 and initially stood at Pauls Mill in Versailles, Kentucky, for a fee of $15,000. His first crop of US foals (2012) would begin racing in 2014. He was sold and exported to Japan in 2013 where he stood for one breeding season and died on December 23, 2013, of colic. His first crop of Japanese-born foals would begin racing in 2016.

== Pedigree ==
Summer Bird joined Mine That Bird as the second foal of Birdstone to win a Triple Crown race and became the second third-generation descendant of Unbridled to do so. On his sire's side, he is also descended from 1964 Triple Crown contender Northern Dancer. His dam, Hong Kong Squall, was sired by Summer Squall, giving Summer Bird relation to 1999 Triple Crown contender Charismatic and making him a descendant of 1973 Triple Crown winner Secretariat. His dam's mother, Hong Kong Jade, gives him descent from 1987 Triple Crown contender Alysheba and, thus, Alydar, the horse that finished second in all three Triple Crown races to Affirmed in 1978. Hong Kong Squall died May 20, 2010, after giving birth to a full sister to Summer Bird.

Pedigree of Summer Bird
Sire Birdstone	Grindstone	Unbridled	Fappiano
Sire Birdstone	Grindstone	Unbridled	Gana Facil
Sire Birdstone	Grindstone	Buzz My Bell	Drone
Sire Birdstone	Grindstone	Buzz My Bell	Chateaupavia
Sire Birdstone	Dear Birdie	Storm Bird	Northern Dancer
Sire Birdstone	Dear Birdie	Storm Bird	South Ocean
Sire Birdstone	Dear Birdie	Hush Dear	Silent Screen
Sire Birdstone	Dear Birdie	Hush Dear	You All
Dam Hong Kong Squall	Summer Squall	Storm Bird	Northern Dancer
Dam Hong Kong Squall	Summer Squall	Storm Bird	South Ocean
Dam Hong Kong Squall	Summer Squall	Weekend Surprise	Secretariat
Dam Hong Kong Squall	Summer Squall	Weekend Surprise	Lassie Dear
Dam Hong Kong Squall	Hong Kong Jade	Alysheba	Alydar
Dam Hong Kong Squall	Hong Kong Jade	Alysheba	Bel Sheba
Dam Hong Kong Squall	Hong Kong Jade	Ruby Slippers	Nijinsky
Dam Hong Kong Squall	Hong Kong Jade	Ruby Slippers	Moon Glitter
