= 2009 Preakness Stakes =

134th running of the Preakness Stakes

134th Preakness Stakes
- The Preakness Stakes
- "The Second Jewel of the Triple Crown" "The Run for the Black-Eyed Susans"
- Location: Pimlico Race Course, Baltimore, Maryland, United States
- Date: May 16, 2009
- Winning horse: Rachel Alexandra
- Winning time: 1:55.08
- Final odds: 1.8-1
- Jockey: Calvin Borel
- Trainer: Steve Asmussen
- Conditions: Fast
- Surface: Dirt
- Attendance: 77,850

The 2009 Preakness Stakes was the 134th running of the Preakness Stakes, the second leg of horse racing's Triple Crown. The value of the race was $1,100,000 in stakes. The race was sponsored by BlackBerry and hence officially was called BlackBerry Preakness Stakes. The race took place on May 16, 2009. Post time was 6:19 p.m. EDT and was televised in the United States on the NBC television networks. The Maryland Jockey Club reported total attendance of 77,850, this is recorded as third highest on the list of American thoroughbred racing top attended events for North America in 2009.

Rachel Alexandra won by a length, holding off the rapidly closing 2009 Kentucky Derby winner Mine That Bird to become the first filly since 1924 to win the Preakness Stakes, and to extend horse racing's longest losing streak to 31 years since Affirmed became the last Triple Crown winner in 1978.

== Payout ==
The 134th Preakness Stakes Payout Schedule

Program Number	Horse Name	Win	Place	Show
13	Rachel Alexandra	$ 5.60	$4.60	$3.60
2	Mine That Bird	-	$6.60	$4.80
3	Musket Man	-	-	$5.00

- $1 Exacta: (13-2) paid $19.60
- $1 Trifecta: (13-2-3) paid $108.10
- $1 Superfecta: (13-2-3-10) paid $2,903.80

== The full chart ==
The draw for The Preakness Stakes was done on Wednesday, May 13, 2009, near the stakes barn at Pimlico Race Course. Rachel Alexandra was made the morning line 8-5 favorite, the first filly accorded that status since 1988. Twelve colts and a filly made up the field.

Finish Position	Margin (lengths)	Post Position	Horse name	Jockey	Trainer	Owner	Morning Line Odds	Post Time Odds	Purse Earnings
1st	0	13	Rachel Alexandra	Calvin Borel	Steve Asmussen	Stonestreet Stables	8-5 favorite	1.80 favorite	$660,000
2nd	1	2	Mine That Bird	Mike E. Smith	Bennie L. Woolley Jr.	Double Eagle Ranch	6-1	6.60	$220,000
3rd	1 1/2	3	Musket Man	Eibar Coa	Derek Ryan	E. Fein & V. Carlson	8-1	11.10	$121,000
4th	4	10	Flying Private	Alan Garcia	D. Wayne Lukas	R. Baker & W. Mack	50-1	25.40	$66,000
5th	5 1/2	1	Big Drama	John Velazquez	David Fawkes	Harold L. Queen	10-1	10.40	$33,000
6th	7 3/4	7	Papa Clem	Rafael Bejarano	Gary Stute	Bo Hirsch	12-1	14.10	
7th	8	6	Terrain	Jeremy Rose	Albert Stall Jr.	Adele Dilschneider	30-1	25.80	
8th	8 3/4	4	Luv Gov	Jamie Theriot	D. Wayne Lukas	Marylou Whitney	50-1	24.10	
9th	11	8	General Quarters	Julien Leparoux	Thomas R. McCarthy	Thomas R. McCarthy	20-1	16.30	
10th	18 3/4	5	Friesan Fire	Gabriel Saez	J. Larry Jones	Vinery Stables	6-1	9.00	
11th	26	9	Pioneerof the Nile	Garrett Gomez	Bob Baffert	Zayat Stables	5-1	6.10	
12th	32-1/4	12	Tone It Down	Kent Desormeaux	William Komlo	M and D Stable	50-1	23.90	
13th	33 3/4	11	Take the Points	Edgar Prado	Todd A. Pletcher	Starlight Partners	30-1	18.00	

- Winning Breeder: Dolphus C. Morrison; (KY)
- Final Time – 1:55:08
- Track Condition – Fast
- Attendance - 77,850

== Performance ==
- The first Preakness victory by a filly since 1924 when Nellie Morse won.
- Calvin Borel was the first rider to win the Kentucky Derby and Preakness on different horses in the same year.
- First time since 1906 that a filly (Whimsical) won as a favorite
- First horse to win from post position 13
- Nielsen ratings were the second best since 1990. Only Smarty Jones's victory in 2004 was watched by more viewers since 1990

== Infield ==
The 2009 Preakness Stakes included entertainment in the infield. The performers in the infield included ZZ Top, Buckcherry, and Charm City Devils. In addition, there was a professional volleyball tournament in the infield. This year also marked the first year in which fans were not allowed to bring their own beverages into the infield, a move which has drawn some mixed reactions. Infield ticket sales were down 17% this year, which some are attributing to the ban, but others attribute to the Great Recession.

== See also ==
- 2009 Kentucky Derby
- 2009 Belmont Stakes
