= Louisiana Derby top three finishers =

This is a listing of the horses that finished in either first, second, or third place and the number of starters in the Louisiana Derby, an American Grade 2 race for three-year-olds at 1-1/8 miles on dirt held at Fair Grounds Race Course in New Orleans, Louisiana. (List 1973–present)

Year	Winner	Second	Third	Starters
2026	Emerging Market	Pavlovian	Golden Tempo	9
2025	Tiztastic	Chunk Of Gold	Instant Replay	10
2024	Catching Freedom	Honor Marie	Tuscan Gold	11
2023	Kingsbarns	Disarm	Jace's Road	12
2022	Epicenter	Zozos	Pioneer Of Medina	9
2021	Hot Rod Charlie	Midnight Bourbon	O Besos	8
2020	Wells Bayou	Ny Traffic	Modernist	14
2019	By My Standards	Spinoff	Sueno	11
2018	Noble Indy	Lone Sailor	My Boy Jack	10
2017	Girvin	Patch	Local Hero	9
2016	Gun Runner	Tom's Ready	Dazzling Gem	10
2015	International Star	Stanford	War Story	9
2014	Vicar's In Trouble	Intense Holiday	Commanding Curve	10
2013	Revolutionary	Mylute	Departing	14
2012	Hero of Order	Mark Valeski	Rousing Sermon	13
2011	Pants on Fire	Nehro	Mucho Macho Man	12
2010	Mission Impazible	A Little Warm	Drosselmeyer	13
2009	Friesan Fire	Papa Clem	Terrain	9
2008	Pyro	My Pal Charlie	Yankee Bravo	9
2007	Circular Quay	Ketchikan	Zanjero	8
2006	No Race	No Race	No Race	0
2005	High Limit	Vicarage	Storm Surge	9
2004	Wimbledon	Borrego	Pollard's Vision	11
2003	Peace Rules	Funny Cide	Lone Star Sky	10
2002	Repent	Easyfromthegitgo	It'sallinthechase	7
2001	Fifty Stars	Millennium Wind	Hero's Tribute	9
2000	Mighty	More Than Ready	Captain Steve	10
1999	Kimberlite Pipe	Answer Lively	Ecton Park	8
1998	Comic Strip	Nite Dreamer	Captain Maestri	10
1997	Crypto Star	Stop Watch	Smoke Glacken	9
1996	Grindstone	Zarb's Magic	Commanders Palace	8
1995	Petionville	In Character	Moonlight Dancer	11
1994	Kandaly	Game Coin	Argolid	10
1993	Dixieland Heat	Offshore Pirate	Tossofthecoin	13
1992	Line In The Sand	Hill Pass	Colony Light	9
1991	Richman	Near the Limit	Far Out Wadleigh	11
1990	Heaven Again	Big E. Z.	Very Formal	9
1989	Dispersal	Majesty's Imp	Dansil	9
1988	Risen Star	Word Pirate	Pastourrelles	9
1987	J. T.'s Pet	Authentic Hero	Plumcake	8
1986	Country Light	Bolshoi Boy	Lightning Touch	13
1985	Violado	Creme Fraiche	Irish Fighter	11
1984	Taylor's Special	Silent King	Fight Over	7
1983	Balboa Native	Found Pearl Harbor	Slewpy	8
1982	El Baba	Linkage	Spoonful of Honey	8
1981	Woodchopper	A Run	Beau Rit	13
1980	Prince Valiant	Native Uproar	Brent's Trans Am	10
1979	Golden Act	Rivalero	Incredible Ease	9
1978	Esop's Foibles	Quadratic	Batonnier	10
1977	Clev Er Tell	Run Dusty Run	A Letter to Harry	9
1976	Johnny Appleseed	Glassy Dip	Gay Jitterbug	15
1975	Master Derby	Colonel Power	Honey Mark	11
1974	Sellout	Buck's Bid	Beau Groton	12
1973	Leo's Pisces	Navajo	Angle Light	11

== See also ==
Louisiana Derby
