= 50 to 1 =

- Directed by: Jim Wilson
- Written by: Faith Conroy; Jim Wilson
- Produced by: Jim Wilson
- Starring: Skeet Ulrich; Christian Kane; William Devane; Madelyn Deutch; Todd Lowe; Calvin Borel
- Music by: William Ross
- Release date: March 21, 2014
- Running time: 110 minutes
- Country: United States
- Language: English
- Budget: $10 million
- Box office: $1,064,454

50 to 1 is a 2014 American drama film based on the true story of Mine That Bird, an undersized thoroughbred racehorse who won the 2009 Kentucky Derby in one of the biggest upsets in the history of the race. The film received a limited release on March 21, 2014. It was directed by Jim Wilson, who also co-wrote the script with Faith Conroy, and stars Skeet Ulrich, Christian Kane and William Devane. Jockey Calvin Borel, who rode Mine that Bird to his upset Derby win, plays himself in the film.

== Plot ==
A misfit group of New Mexico cowboys find themselves on the journey of a lifetime when their undersized thoroughbred race horse qualifies for the Kentucky Derby. Based on the true story of Mine That Bird, the cowboys face a series of mishaps on their way to Churchill Downs, becoming the ultimate underdogs in a final showdown with the world's racing elite.

== Cast ==
- Skeet Ulrich as Chip Woolley
- Christian Kane as Mark Allen
- William Devane as Leonard "Doc" Blach
- Madelyn Deutch as Alex
- Todd Lowe as Kelly
- Calvin Borel as Himself

== Reception ==
Gary Goldstein of the Los Angeles Times thought the film was slow-moving and the characters lacked interest, and the film "an idea better in theory than in practice". Michael O'Sullivan of The Washington Post said that as with real-life horse racing, "the exciting part lasts only a minute or two, and then it’s over. The rest of the movie is filler (or maybe foreplay)." Bill Edelstein of Variety commented that the film's attempt to appeal to a faith-based audience seemed "a rather calculated play near the finish". On the other hand, he thought Calvin Borel turned out to be "adept at slapstick" and found Borel's character to be "more compelling than the leads". Lawrence Toppman of The Charlotte Observer gave the film a positive review, finding the film's "old-fashioned" qualities appealing.

== See also ==
- List of films about horses
- List of films about horse racing
