= Papa Clem =

American-bred Thoroughbred racehorse (2006–2025)

- Sire: Smart Strike
- Grandsire: Mr. Prospector
- Dam: Miss Houdini
- Damsire: Belong To Me
- Sex: Stallion
- Foaled: February 13, 2006; Kentucky, U.S.
- Died: February 2025 (aged 19); Turkey
- Country: United States
- Colour: Bay
- Breeder: Bo Hirsch
- Owner: Resat Akkan
- Trainer: Gary Stute
- Record: 13: 3-2-2
- Earnings: US$1,121,190

Major wins
- Arkansas Derby (2009); San Fernando Stakes (2010)

Papa Clem (February 13, 2006 – February 2025) was an American Thoroughbred racehorse who was a contender for the 2009 U.S. Triple Crown. Papa Clem was bred and raced by Bo Hirsch who named the Southern California-based colt for his late father, Clement Hirsch, a respected Thoroughbred owner/breeder and a co-founder of the Oak Tree Racing Association. Clement Hirsch's grandchildren all called him "Papa Clem."

== Biography ==
Papa Clem was sired by Smart Strike, the Leading sire in North America in 2007 and 2008. His dam was Miss Houdini who was bred by Clement Hirsch and raced by Bo Hirsch. Miss Houdini was the 2002 winner of the Grade I Del Mar Debutante Stakes. Damsire, Belong To Me, was a stakes-winning son of three-time Leading sire in North America, Danzig. Papa Clem was conditioned for racing by trainer Gary Stute, son of long-time California trainer Melvin Stute and nephew of the late Warren Stute who trained horses for Clement Hirsch for more than 40 years.

At age two, Papa Clem debuted in November 2008 at Hollywood Park Racetrack and won for the first time in his third and final start at Santa Anita Park. He made his three-year-old debut on February 9 at Santa Anita where he ran second by a head to Pioneerof the Nile in the Robert B. Lewis Stakes. His next race was the March 14th Louisiana Derby where, on a sloppy track at the Fair Grounds Race Course, he finished second by 7¼ lengths behind Friesan Fire. In the April 11th $1 million Arkansas Derby on a fast track, Papa Clem came from behind to catch race favorite Old Fashioned and then battle with him down the homestretch to a win by a half-length.

Papa Clem finished fourth in the May 2, 2009 Kentucky Derby, the first leg of the U.S. Triple Crown series.

At age 4, after dropping six races in a row, Papa Clem battled for, and won, the 2010 San Fernando Stakes.

Papa Clem was retired to stud in 2010 and stood at Legacy Ranch in Clements, California for $6,500.

In 2017, Papa Clem was bought by Turkish breeder Resat Akkan and brought to Turkey where he continued studding.

In 2021 his half-sister Ce Ce won the GI Breeder's Cup Filly & Mare Sprint.

On February 19, 2025, it was reported that Papa Clem had "died recently", according to his owner Reşat Akkan. He was 19.

== Sources ==
- Papa Clem's pedigree and partial racing stats
- The 2009 Arkansas Derby, with video, at the NTRA
