= 2009 Kentucky Derby =

Horse race

135th Kentucky Derby Presented by Yum! Brands
- Kentucky Derby
- Official logo for the 2009 Kentucky Derby
- Location: Churchill Downs
- Date: May 2, 2009
- Winning horse: Mine That Bird
- Winning time: 2:02.66
- Starting price: 50-1
- Jockey: Calvin Borel
- Trainer: Bennie L. Woolley Jr.
- Owner: Double Eagle Ranch et al.
- Conditions: Sloppy
- Surface: Dirt
- Attendance: 153,653

The 2009 Kentucky Derby was the 135th running of the Kentucky Derby. The value of the race was $2,177,000 in stakes. The race was sponsored by Yum! Brands and hence officially was called Kentucky Derby Presented by Yum! Brands. The race took place on May 2, 2009, and was televised in the United States on the NBC television network. The Atlanta-based Southern Tourism Society named the Kentucky Derby Festival, which was April 11 to May 1, as one of the top tourist attractions in the Southeast for the first half of 2009. The post time was 6:24 p.m. EDT (10:24 p.m. UTC). The official attendance at Churchill Downs was 153,563.

== Results ==
"Down toward the inside coming on through, that is, uh, Mine That Bird, now is coming on to take the lead as they come to the finish. In a spectacular...spectacular upset...Mine that Bird has won the Kentucky Derby! An impossible result here!"

— NBC Sports race announcer Tom Durkin calling the end of the race

The ending of the race came as a shock to those in attendance as Mine That Bird, trained by "Chip" Woolley Jr. and ridden by Calvin Borel, running dead last until the final turn, suddenly moved into the lead in the final furlong. He took the lead so fast after the final turn that NBC Sports race announcer Tom Durkin didn't notice the gelding and was still heatedly describing the performance of Pioneerof the Nile and Musket Man despite Mine That Bird already opening a three-length lead over the pack. Mine That Bird won by 6 3/4 lengths for the longest margin of victory in over 60 years. He was the longest-odds horse to win the Derby in over 85 years.

Results	Post	Horse	Winnings
Win	8	Mine That Bird	$1,417,000
Place	16	Pioneerof the Nile	$400,000
Show	2	Musket Man	$200,000
Fourth	7	Papa Clem	$100,000
Fifth	11	Chocolate Candy	$60,000

- Margins – 6 3/4 lengths, nose
- Time – 2:02.66
- Track – Sloppy (sealed)

== Payout ==
The 135th Kentucky Derby Payout Schedule

Program Number	Horse Name	Win	Place	Show
8	Mine That Bird	US$103.20	$54.00	$25.80
16	Pioneerof The Nile	-	$8.40	$6.40
2	Musket Man	-	-	$12.00

- $1 Exacta: (8-16) Paid $1,037.30
- $1 Trifecta: (8-16-2) Paid $20,750.30
- $1 Superfecta: (8-16-2-7) Paid $278,503.20

Churchill Downs had scheduled their first futures wager pool for the year to begin on February 12, with two subsequent pools opening on March 12 and April 2. Offering 24 betting options (23 individual horses at odds ranging from 10–1 to 50–1, and an "All others" option at 5-2 odds), favorites include Capt. Candyman Can and Old Fashioned at 10–1, followed by Friesan Fire, Midshipman, Pioneerof the Nile, Stardom Bound, This Ones for Phil, and Vineyard Haven at 12–1.

After the starter draw for the running, I Want Revenge was installed as the 3-1 morning line favorite. His scratch later in the morning marked the first time that the morning line favorite was scratched on the day of the race.

Friesan Fire, winner of the Louisiana Derby, started the race as the 19-5 (3.80-1) favorite.

== The field ==
Post positions were drawn Thursday, April 30, 2009.

Post	Horse name	Trainer	Jockey	Opening Odds	Starting Odds	Finishing Pos.
1	West Side Bernie	Kelly J. Breen	Stewart Elliott	30-1	32.40	9
2	Musket Man	Derek S. Ryan	Eibar Coa	20-1	19.00	3
3	Mr. Hot Stuff	Eoin G. Harty	John Velazquez	30-1	28.40	15
4	Advice	Todd A. Pletcher	René Douglas	30-1	49.00	13
5	Hold Me Back	William I. Mott	Kent Desormeaux	15-1	12.70	12
6	Friesan Fire	J. Larry Jones	Gabriel Saez	5-1	3.80 Fav.	18
7	Papa Clem	Gary Stute	Rafael Bejarano	20-1	12.20	4
8	Mine That Bird	Bennie L. Woolley Jr.	Calvin Borel	50-1	50.60	1
9	Join in the Dance	Todd Pletcher	Chris DeCarlo	50-1	51.40	7
10	Regal Ransom	Saeed bin Suroor	Alan Garcia	30-1	22.60	8
11	Chocolate Candy	Jerry Hollendorfer	Mike E. Smith	20-1	10.00	5
12	General Quarters	Thomas R. McCarthy	Julien Leparoux	20-1	10.30	10
13	I Want Revenge	Jeff Mullins	Joe Talamo	3-1 Scratched	Scratched	Scratched
14	Atomic Rain	Kelly J. Breen	Joe Bravo	50-1	55.20	16
15	Dunkirk	Todd A. Pletcher	Edgar Prado	4-1	5.20	11
16	Pioneerof the Nile	Bob Baffert	Garrett Gomez	4-1	6.30	2
17	Summer Bird	Tim A. Ice	Chris Rosier	50-1	43.60	6
18	Nowhere to Hide	Nick Zito	Shaun Bridgmohan	50-1	45.50	17
19	Desert Party	Saeed bin Suroor	Ramon A. Dominguez	15-1	14.80	14
20	Flying Private	D. Wayne Lukas	Robby Albarado	50-1	46.60	19

I Want Revenge was scratched on the morning of the race because of lameness issues in the colt's left front ankle. In addition, Quality Road, who had been an early favorite, was withdrawn from the race on April 27 because of a quarter crack in his right front hoof.

== Notable achievements ==
- Longest winning margin since 1946 when Assault won by 8 lengths
- Calvin Borel is the first jockey since Jerry Bailey in 1993 to win the Kentucky Oaks and Kentucky Derby in the same year. Borel won the Kentucky Oaks aboard Rachel Alexandra
- Mine That Bird is the first Sovereign Award as champion two-year-old colt (2008) in Canada to win the Kentucky Derby since Sunny's Halo (1983)
- Mine That Bird winning odds of 50.60-1 was the second highest in Kentucky Derby history after Donerail (1913) now fourth highest winning odds.

== Subsequent Grade I wins ==
Mine That Bird never won another race, though he did finish second in the Preakness to Horse of the Year Rachel Alexandra and third in the Belmont in the same year. Several other horses went on to achieve Grade I success:

- General Quarters – Turf Classic Stakes in 2010.
- Summer Bird – Belmont Stakes, Travers Stakes, Jockey Club Gold Cup

Mr. Hot Stuff never won another race on the flat, but did become a notable steeplechaser. He won the Grade I A. P. Smithwick Memorial Steeplechase Stakes in 2013 and the American Grand National Hurdle Stakes in 2014.

== Subsequent breeding careers ==
The most notable progeny of participants in the 2009 Derby are as follows.

Pioneerof the Nile (2nd)

- American Pharoah – 2015 Kentucky Derby, Preakness Stakes, Belmont Stakes, Haskell Invitational, Breeders' Cup Classic
- Classic Empire – Breeders' Cup Juvenile, Arkansas Derby. Second in Preakness Stakes
- Midnight Storm – Shoemaker Mile

== Chief Party Officer ==
Building on the longstanding tradition of drinking, partying, and general revelry in the infield, Churchill Downs officials announced that they are accepting applications to be the second "Chief Party Officer." According to Chief Marketing Officer Dave Tompkins, "The non-stop revelry can test the most die-hard partiers, so a CPO candidate must be able to take the reins and lead our infield nation to new heights of fun and frivolity." In an effort to promote the position, Tim "Stymie" Snyder, the 2008 Chief Party Officer, attended Super Bowl XLIII to personally recruit applicants. The winner was announced March 6, and prizes include use of an RV (billed as a "luxurious boardroom on wheels") for the year. This year's Chief Party Officer is Nick Ferrara.

== See also ==
- 2009 Preakness Stakes
- 2009 Belmont Stakes
- Kentucky Derby Challenge Stakes, an English Thoroughbred horse race intended to become an annual race, but was run only one time on March 18, 2009; winner was guaranteed one of the twenty starting spots at the Kentucky Derby but ended up not running in it
