= Dullahan (horse) =

American-bred Thoroughbred racehorse

- Sire: Even The Score
- Grandsire: Unbridled's Song
- Dam: Mining My Own
- Damsire: Smart Strike
- Sex: Colt
- Foaled: 8 February 2009
- Country: United States
- Colour: Chestnut
- Breeder: Phil Needham
- Owner: Donegal Racing
- Trainer: Dale Romans
- Record: 12: 3–2–3
- Earnings: $1,735,901

Major wins
- Breeders' Futurity Stakes (2011); Blue Grass Stakes (2012); Pacific Classic (2012)

Dullahan (February 8, 2009 – October 20, 2013) was an American Thoroughbred racehorse. As a two-year-old he recorded his first win in the Grade I Breeders' Futurity Stakes. In early 2012, he won the Blue Grass Stakes, finished third in the Kentucky Derby and was the beaten favorite for the Belmont Stakes. Later in the season, he defeated older horses in the Pacific Classic. He was euthanized of a ruptured colon on October 20, 2013, at Winstar Farm in Versailles, Kentucky.

== Background ==
Dullhan was a chestnut colt with a white blaze and a white sock on his right hind leg. He was bred in the United States by Phil Needham. As a son of the mare Mining My Own, he was a half-brother of the Kentucky Derby winner Mine That Bird. As a yearling, he was sent to the Keeneland sales, where he was bought for $250,000 by Jerry Crawford and Donegal Racing.

== Racing career ==
=== 2011: two-year-old season ===
Dullahan was slow to show worthwhile form as a two-year-old, being well beaten in minor events at Churchill Downs in June and July. He then moved to Saratoga where he finished second in a maiden race before finishing third in the Grade II With Anticipation Stakes on turf in September. Despite having failed to win in four starts, he moved up to Grade I level for the Breeders' Futurity Stakes at Keeneland. Ridden by Kent Desormeaux, he was held up in the early stages before finishing strongly to take the lead near the finish and won by three-quarters of a length from Majestic City. He was badly hampered and almost fell in the early stages but recovered well, leading Desormeaux to describe him as a "super horse". In the Breeders' Cup Juvenile at Churchill Downs on 5 November, Dullahan started a 16/1 outsider and stayed on in the straight to finish fourth of the thirteen runners behind Hansen, Union Rags and Creative Cause.

=== 2012: three-year-old season ===
Dullahan made his first appearance as a three-year-old at Gulfstream Park in March, where he finished second to Howe Great in the Grade III Palm Beach Stakes. A month later, he was sent to Keeneland to contest the Blue Grass Stakes, in which he was matched against the Eclipse Award winner Hansen for the second time. In front of a record crowd of 40,617, Desormeaux restrained the colt in the early stages before moving him up to overtake Hansen near the finish and win going away by one and a quarter lengths. USA Today described his performance as "scintillating" and reported that Romans felt that Dullahan was by far his best chance of winning the Kentucky Derby. In the Derby, Dullahan started at odds of 12/1 in a field of twenty. He raced in the middle of the field before being switched to the outside in the straight. He made steady progress to finish third behind I'll Have Another and Bodemeister.

Dullahan skipped the Preakness to go straight for the Belmont Stakes on June 9. Following the late withdrawal of "I'll Have Another", he was made the favorite for the race, but finished fifth behind Union Rags. After a seven-week break, Dullahan returned in the Haskell Invitational Stakes at Monmouth Park, in which he finished seventh, behind Paynter. A month later, he was tested against older horses in the TVG Pacific Classic at Del Mar Racetrack and won by half a length from Game On Dude in a new track record time of 1:59.54. It was Dullahan's third Grade I win, all of them achieved on a synthetic surface, and gave the colt automatic entry into the Breeders' Cup Classic.

Dullahan's two remaining starts as a three-year-old were disappointing: he finished fifth when favorite for the Jamaica Handicap at Belmont in October and then ran ninth, behind Little Mike in the Breeders' Cup Turf.

=== 2013: four-year-old season ===
Dullahan was sent to race in the United Arab Emirates in March 2013 but ran poorly in his two races, including the Dubai World Cup in which he finished eleventh of the twelve runners behind Animal Kingdom. On his return to the US, he finished third in the Grade III Arlington Handicap but then finished eighth behind Game On Dude when he attempted to repeat his 2012 success in the Pacific Classic. Dullahan sustained a tendon injury in the Pacific Classic and was retired from racing on October 14. Six days later, the colt suffered a severe attack of colic in his stable. Despite prompt medical attention and surgery, he was euthanized at 4:45 am on October 20. According to a Facebook post by Dale Romans, Dullahan was regarded by those who knew him as an incredible horse – full of personality and talent. "Love you, Dullahan – our thoughts and prayers are with you, buddy !!

== Pedigree ==
Pedigree of Dullahan (USA), chestnut colt, 2009
Sire Even The Score (USA) 1998	Unbridled's Song; 1993	Unbridled	Fappiano
Sire Even The Score (USA) 1998	Unbridled's Song; 1993	Unbridled	Gana Facil
Sire Even The Score (USA) 1998	Unbridled's Song; 1993	Trolley Song	Caro
Sire Even The Score (USA) 1998	Unbridled's Song; 1993	Trolley Song	Lucky Spell
Sire Even The Score (USA) 1998	Ashtabula; 1991	Rahy	Blushing Groom
Sire Even The Score (USA) 1998	Ashtabula; 1991	Rahy	Glorious Song
Sire Even The Score (USA) 1998	Ashtabula; 1991	Now Your Teapottin	Native Royalty
Sire Even The Score (USA) 1998	Ashtabula; 1991	Now Your Teapottin	Sweet Bernice
Dam Mining My Own (USA) 2001	Smart Strike; 1992	Mr. Prospector	Raise a Native
Dam Mining My Own (USA) 2001	Smart Strike; 1992	Mr. Prospector	Gold Digger
Dam Mining My Own (USA) 2001	Smart Strike; 1992	Classy 'n Smart	Smarten
Dam Mining My Own (USA) 2001	Smart Strike; 1992	Classy 'n Smart	No Class
Dam Mining My Own (USA) 2001	Aspenelle; 1990	Vice Regent	Northern Dancer
Dam Mining My Own (USA) 2001	Aspenelle; 1990	Vice Regent	Victoria Regina
Dam Mining My Own (USA) 2001	Aspenelle; 1990	Little To Do	Dynastic
Dam Mining My Own (USA) 2001	Aspenelle; 1990	Little To Do	Tribal To Do (Family: 23-b)
