= Ack Ack Stakes =

- Class: Grade III
- Location: Churchill Downs; Louisville, Kentucky, United States
- Inaugurated: 1991 (as Ack Ack Handicap)
- Race type: Thoroughbred – Flat racing
- Website: Churchill Downs

Race information
- Distance: 1 mile (8 furlongs)
- Surface: Dirt
- Track: left-handed
- Qualification: Three-years-old and older
- Weight: Base weights with allowances: 4-year-olds and up: 125 lbs. 3-year-olds: 122 lbs.
- Purse: US$400,000 (2023)
- Bonuses: Winner receives automatic entrance to the Breeders' Cup Dirt Mile

The Ack Ack Stakes is a Grade III American Thoroughbred horse race for three years old and older, over a distance of one mile on the dirt held annually in September at Churchill Downs, in Louisville, Kentucky. The event currently carries a purse of $400,000.

== History ==
The race is named for the great Ack Ack, inducted into the National Museum of Racing and Hall of Fame in 1986 and the Horse of the Year in 1971, as well as ranking number 44 in the Blood-Horse magazine List of the Top 100 U.S. Racehorses of the 20th Century. At age 3, he won the 1969 Derby Trial in his lone start at Churchill Downs with a time of 1:34.40, which was a track record at the time.

Since inception in 1991, the Ack Ack has been contested at three different distances:

- 1 mile : 1991, 2006–2009, 2012
- 7 1/2 furlongs : 1994–2005
- 1 1/16 miles : 2010, 2011 (Breeders' Cup)

The inaugural running of the event was on 27 October 1991 with Seven Spades the longest price runner in the field of 12 at 40-1 holding on to win by a neck in a time of 1:37.62 for the mile on the sloppy track.

The event was not held in 1992 and 1993.

Previously a Listed race, it was upgraded to Grade III status for 1997 by the American Graded Stakes Committee.

Sin 2013 the event has been scheduled in September and in 2016 the conditions of the event were changed from handicap to stakes allowance.

== Records ==
Speed record

- 1 mile: 1:33.78 – Pants On Fire (2013)
- 7 1/2 furlongs: 1:27.15 – Cappuchino (2003)
- 1 1/16 miles: 1:43.79 - Apart (2010)

Margins

- 8 3/4 lengths – Istan (2007)

Most wins

- No horse has won this race more than once.

Most wins by a jockey

- 4 – Calvin Borel (1996, 1998, 1999, 2004)

Most wins by a trainer

- 3 – Brad H. Cox (2021, 2023, 2026)

Most wins by an owner

- 2 – John A. Franks (1996, 1999)

== Winners ==
Year	Winner	Age	Jockey	Trainer	Owner	Distance	Time	Purse	Grade	Ref
Ack Ack Stakes
2026	Bishops Bay	6	Tyler Gaffalione	Brad H. Cox	KAS Stables	1 mile	1:34.51	$399,000	III	
2025	Tumbarumba	5	Tyler Gaffalione	Brian A. Lynch	Wathnan Racing	1 mile	1:35.44	$335,000	III	
2024	Three Technique	7	Rafael Bejarano	Jason Cook	Eric Grindley, David E. Miller, Howard F. Preuss & John Werner	1 mile	1:35.32	$356,000	III	
2023	Zozos	4	Florent Geroux	Brad H. Cox	Barry & Joni Butzow	1 mile	1:35.32	$400,000	III	
2022	Senor Buscador	4	Francisco Arrieta	Todd W. Fincher	Joe R. Peacock Jr.	1 mile	1:34.60	$300,000	III	
2021	Plainsman	6	Joel Rosario	Brad H. Cox	Shortleaf Stable	1 mile	1:33.85	$297,250	III	
2020	Mr. Money	4	Gabriel Saez	W. Bret Calhoun	Allied Racing Stable & Spendthrift Farm	1 mile	1:34.85	$100,000	III	
2019	Mr Freeze	4	Robby Albarado	Dale L. Romans	Jim Bakke & Gerald Isbister	1 mile	1:34.11	$150,000	III	
2018	Seeking the Soul	5	Brian Hernandez Jr.	Dallas Stewart	Charles E. Fipke	1 mile	1:35.01	$100,000	III	
2017	Awesome Slew	4	Corey J. Lanerie	Mark E. Casse	Live Oak Plantation	1 mile	1:35.02	$100,000	III	
2016	Tom's Ready	3	Brian Hernandez Jr.	Dallas Stewart	G M B Racing	1 mile	1:34.86	$100,000	III	
Ack Ack Handicap
2015	Tapiture	4	Ricardo Santana Jr.	Steven M. Asmussen	Winchell Thoroughbreds	1 mile	1:35.39	$100,000	III	
2014	Bradester	4	Corey J. Lanerie	Eddie Kenneally	Joseph W. Sutton	1 mile	1:34.54	$107,300	III	
2013	Pants On Fire	5	Paco Lopez	Kelly J. Breen	Lori & George Hall	1 mile	1:33.78	$110,700	III	
2012	Neck 'n Neck	3	Brian Hernandez Jr.	Ian R. Wilkes	A. Stevens Miles Jr.	1 mile	1:36.38	$110,400	III	
2011	Mister Marti Gras	3	Julien R. Leparoux	Chris M. Block	Lothenbach Stables	1 1/16 miles	1:45.68	$109,700	III	
2010	Apart	3	Garrett K. Gomez	Albert Stall Jr.	Adele B. Dilschneider	1 1/16 miles	1:43.79	$108,600	III	
2009	Demarcation	5	Jesus Lopez Castanon	Paul J. McGee	Amerman Racing	1 mile	1:36.15	$111,000	III	
2008	Magna Graduate	6	Shaun Bridgmohan	Steven M. Asmussen	Elizabeth H. Alexander	1 mile	1:36:06	$108,200	III	
2007	Istan	5	Kent J. Desormeaux	William I. Mott	Darpat S.L. Stables	1 mile	1:34.08	$221,600	III	
2006	It's No Joke	4	Robby Albarado	Rebecca Maker	Stanley E. Fulton	1 mile	1:34.77	$232,800	III	
2005	Straight Line	3	Shaun Bridgmohan	Harvey L. Vanier	Nancy A. Vanier & Cartwright Thoroughbreds	7 1/2 furlongs	1:28.34	$112,200	III	
2004	Sir Cherokee	4	Calvin H. Borel	Michael A. Tomlinson	Domino Stud	7 1/2 furlongs	1:29.48	$165,300	III	
2003	Cappuchino	4	Jon Court	Jerry Hollendorfer	Howard Litt, George Todaro, Jerry Hollendorfer	7 1/2 furlongs	1:27.15	$165,450	III	
2002	Twilight Road	5	Pat Day	Paul J. McGee	Donamire Farm	7 1/2 furlongs	1:29.39	$112,700	III	
2001	Illusioned	3	Pat Day	William I. Mott	Kinsman Stable, Team Valor & Heiligbrodt Stable	7 1/2 furlongs	1:28.63	$114,300	III	
2000	Chindi	6	Timothy T. Doocy	Steve Hobby	Cres Ran	7 1/2 furlongs	1:29.30	$113,700	III	
1999	Littlebitlively	5	Calvin H. Borel	Bobby C. Barnett	John A. Franks	7 1/2 furlongs	1:28.97	$115,600	III	
1998	Distorted Humor	5	Calvin H. Borel	W. Elliott Walden	Russell L. Reineman & Prestonwood Farm	7 1/2 furlongs	1:29.61	$110,100	III	
1997	Cat's Career	4	Willie Martinez	Lynn S. Whiting	Golden Eagle Farm	7 1/2 furlongs	1:32.06	$111,500	III	
1996	Western Trader	5	Calvin H. Borel	Bobby C. Barnett	John A. Franks	7 1/2 furlongs	1:29.84	$113,400	Listed	
1995	Mystery Storm	3	Carlos Gonzalez	Larry Robideaux Jr.	David Beard	7 1/2 furlongs	1:29.10	$116,400	Listed	
1994	Lost Pan	4	Donna M. Barton	D. Wayne Lukas	Overbrook Farm, D. Wayne Lukas & Jim McDonald	7 1/2 furlongs	1:30.27	$84,300	Listed	
1992–1993		Race not held								
1991	Seven Spades	4	Danny W. Cox	C. Neil Huffman	Duane Clark	1 mile	1:37.60	$59,250	Listed	

== See also ==
- List of American and Canadian Graded races
