= Army Mule (horse) =

American Thoroughbred racehorse

- Sire: Friesan Fire
- Grandsire: A.P. Indy
- Dam: Crafty Toast
- Damsire: Crafty Prospector
- Sex: Stallion
- Foaled: May 29, 2014
- Country: United States
- Colour: Bay
- Breeder: Hope Hill Farm
- Owner: St Elias Stable
- Trainer: Todd Pletcher
- Record: 3: 3-0-0
- Earnings: $311,400

Major wins
- Carter Handicap (2018)

Army Mule (foaled May 29, 2014), is an undefeated American Thoroughbred racehorse and sire. He was unraced as a juvenile before winning on his debut as a three-year-old in April 2017. He was off the track with injury problems before winning a minor race in January 2018. He won the Grade I Carter Handicap on his next start, but never ran again and was retired at the end of the year having won his three races by an aggregate of twenty-two lengths.

== Background ==
Army Mule is a bay stallion with a white star bred in Pennsylvania by Hope Hill Farm. As a yearling in October 2015 he was put up for auction at the Fasig-Tipton Midlantic Sale and was bought for $35,000 by Bill Reightler. Army Mule returned to the same sales ring in May 2016 and was sold for $825,000 to Crupi's New Castle Farm. During his racing career he was owned by Vinnie Viola's St Elias Stable and trained by Todd Pletcher.

He was from the second crop of foals sired by the Louisiana Derby winner Friesan Fire. Army Mule's dam Crafty Toast was not a top-class racehorse but showed consistently good form to win five times from thirty-one starts between May 1998 and November 2000. Her dam Give A Toast won the Beaugay Stakes and was descended from the broodmare Tedmelia (foaled 1935), making her a distant relative of Rodrigo de Triano, Shaadi, Regal Rose, Crusade and Seventh Heaven.

== Racing career ==
=== 2017: three-year-old season ===
Army Mule made his track debut in a maiden race over six and a half furlongs at Belmont Park on April 30, 2017, and started 1.55/1 joint-favourite in an eight-runner field. Ridden by John R. Velazquez he took the lead a quarter mile from the finish and drew away to win by eight and a half lengths from Zap Zap Zap in a time of 1:16.79. A knee injury kept the colt off the track for the rest of the year.

=== 2018: four-year-old season ===
After an absence of nine months Army Mule returned to the track on January 31, 2018, when he was partnered by Javier Castellano in a six furlong allowance race at Gulfstream Park. Starting the 1/5 favourite he started slowly but went to the front a furlong out and won "impressively" by seven and a half lengths.

On April 9 Army Mule was moved up sharply in class to contest the Grade I Carter Handicap over seven furlongs at Aqueduct Racetrack. Ridden by Joe Bravo, he was made the 2.1/1 second choice in the betting behind the five-year-old Awesome Slew (winner of the Commonwealth Stakes) in an eleven-runner field which also included Skyler's Scramjet (Tom Fool Handicap), Favorable Outcome (Swale Stakes) and Great Stuff (Toboggan Stakes). After racing in fourth place Army Mule moved up on the inside on the final turn and took the lead entering the straight. He quickly broke away from his opponents and came home six and a quarter lengths clear of Awesome Slew. Pletcher commented "The sky's the limit with him. He's a super-talented horse. It's a matter of keeping him healthy" while Awesome Slew's jockey John Velasquez described the winner as "a monster". Army Mule never raced again and was retired at the end of the season.

In the 2018 World's Best Racehorse Rankings Army Mule was given a rating of 119, making him the 59th best racehorse in the world and the third-best sprinter trained in the United States.

== Stud record ==
In 2019 Army Mule began his stud career at Hill 'n' Dale Farms in Kentucky at a fee of $10,000.

== Pedigree ==
Pedigree of Army Mule (USA), bay stallion, 2014
Sire Friesan Fire (USA) 2006	A.P. Indy (USA); 1989	Seattle Slew	Bold Reasoning
Sire Friesan Fire (USA) 2006	A.P. Indy (USA); 1989	Seattle Slew	My Charmer
Sire Friesan Fire (USA) 2006	A.P. Indy (USA); 1989	Weekend Surprise	Secretariat
Sire Friesan Fire (USA) 2006	A.P. Indy (USA); 1989	Weekend Surprise	Lassie Dear
Sire Friesan Fire (USA) 2006	Bollinger (AUS); 1999	Dehere (USA)	Deputy Minister (CAN)
Sire Friesan Fire (USA) 2006	Bollinger (AUS); 1999	Dehere (USA)	Sister Dot
Sire Friesan Fire (USA) 2006	Bollinger (AUS); 1999	Bint Marscay	Marscay
Sire Friesan Fire (USA) 2006	Bollinger (AUS); 1999	Bint Marscay	Eau d'Etoile (NZ)
Dam Crafty Toast (USA) 1995	Crafty Prospector (USA); 1979	Mr. Prospector	Raise a Native
Dam Crafty Toast (USA) 1995	Crafty Prospector (USA); 1979	Mr. Prospector	Gold Digger
Dam Crafty Toast (USA) 1995	Crafty Prospector (USA); 1979	Real Crafty Lady	In Reality
Dam Crafty Toast (USA) 1995	Crafty Prospector (USA); 1979	Real Crafty Lady	Princess Roycraft
Dam Crafty Toast (USA) 1995	Give A Toast (USA); 1983	Storm Bird (CAN)	Northern Dancer
Dam Crafty Toast (USA) 1995	Give A Toast (USA); 1983	Storm Bird (CAN)	South Ocean
Dam Crafty Toast (USA) 1995	Give A Toast (USA); 1983	Salud	Raise A Cup
Dam Crafty Toast (USA) 1995	Give A Toast (USA); 1983	Salud	Our Jackie (Family: 20-a)
