= California Cup Matron =

American thoroughbred horse race

The California Cup Matron was an American thoroughbred horse race run annually at Santa Anita Park in Arcadia, California during its Oak Tree Racing Association meet in the fall of the year. Raced on dirt over a distance of 1 1/16 miles, it open is open to fillies and mares bred in the state of California. The event currently offers a purse of $150,000 and a trophy.

The California Cup Matron was a part of the "California Cup Day" series of races intended to call attention to, and to honor, the California Thoroughbred racing and breeding industry

== Past winners ==
- 2009 - Lady Railrider (Frank Alvarado)
- 2008 - Famous Ruby (Joel Rosario)
- 2007 - Romance Is Diane (Michael C. Baze)
- 2006 - Somethinaboutlaura
- 2005 - Dream of Summer
- 2004 - Dream of Summer
- 2003 - Royally Chosen
- 2002 - Super High
- 2001 - Cee Dreams
- 2000 - Queenie Belle
- 1999 - Feverish
- 1998 - Belle's Flag
- 1997 - Fun in Excess
- 1996 - Belle's Flag
- 1995 - Yearly Tour
- 1994 - Glass Ceiling
- 1993 - Sensational Eyes
- 1992 - Lovely Habit
- 1991 - Teresa MC
