= I Want Revenge =

American-bred has Thoroughbred racehorse

- Sire: Stephen Got Even
- Grandsire: A.P. Indy
- Dam: Meguial
- Damsire: Roy
- Sex: Stallion
- Foaled: March 26, 2006
- Died: November 24, 2018 (aged 12)
- Country: United States
- Color: Dark Bay/Brown
- Breeder: David J. Lanzman
- Owner: David Lanzman Racing, Inc., IEAH Stables, et al.
- Trainer: Jeff Mullins
- Record: 14: 3–3–6
- Earnings: US$928,000

Major wins
- Gotham Stakes (2009); Wood Memorial Stakes (2009)
- Last updated on July 15, 2017

I Want Revenge (March 26, 2006 – November 24, 2018) was an American Thoroughbred racehorse who was one of the favorites to win the 2009 Kentucky Derby.

== Background ==
He was sired by Grade I winner Stephen Got Even, a son of 1992 American Horse of the Year and U.S. Racing Hall of Fame inductee, A.P. Indy. His dam was the Argentine mare, Meguial, a stakes-winning daughter of Roy, an American-born Champion sire in Chile and Argentina.

Raced by his owner/breeder, David Lanzman, a former rock musician and businessman, I Want Revenge was trained by Jeff Mullins. Later in his career, he was owned by various partnerships.

== Racing career ==
At age two, the colt raced in California. His best stakes result was a runner-up to Pioneerof the Nile in the 2008 Grade I CashCall Futurity at Hollywood Park. In 2009, he ran second to Pioneerof the Nile in the Grade II Robert B. Lewis Stakes at Santa Anita Park. Till then, all of I Want Revenge's races had been on synthetic dirt, but he was then sent to compete on the natural dirt tracks of the East Coast of the United States. At Aqueduct Racetrack in Queens, New York he won the Gotham Stakes by 8 1/2 lengths in stakes record time.

Following the colt's win in the Gotham Stakes, owner/breeder David Lanzman sold a 50% interest in I Want Revenge to IEAH Stables. In his next outing, on the same Aqueduct track, I Want Revenge gave what the track announcer called a remarkable performance in winning the Grade I Wood Memorial Stakes. The colt overcame a miscue at the starting gate that left him four lengths back of the field and then after he caught up, got trapped between horses. Heading for home, he was severely bumped as he moved between horses but burst through and pulled away to win by 1 1/2 lengths.

Regular jockey Joseph Talamo had said that if he won the Kentucky Derby aboard I Want Revenge, he would donate twenty-five percent of what he earned to the Children's Hospital in his native New Orleans that cares for all children, regardless of a family's ability to pay. However, I Want Revenge was scratched from the Kentucky Derby due to injury. His injury was the subject of a lawsuit by his part-owner IEAH Stables against David Lanzman, whom they accused of not informing them about the injury when they purchased a share in the horse. A gelding named Mine That Bird went on to win the Kentucky Derby, at 50:1 odds.

After a layoff of over a year, the colt returned to racing on July 3, 2010, and finished third in the Suburban Handicap at Belmont Park. Afterwards he finished third in the Phillip H. Iselin Stakes.

I Want Revenge started three times in 2011; The Donn Handicap at Gulfstream Park, the Godolphin Mile in Dubai, and the Three Coins Up Stakes at Belmont Park. He finished 4th, 10th, and 2nd in those races, respectively. In 2012, I Want Revenge made his final career start in the ungraded Evening Attire Stakes, finishing second.

== Retirement and Stud Career ==
Sometime after his last race, he was retired. He stood his first season of stud duty at Pauls Mill Farm in Versailles, Kentucky, with a stud fee set at a fee of $10,000. In 2015, I Want Revenge was moved to stand stud at Millennium Farms in Lexington, where his stud fee was dropped down to $5,000.

On January 6, 2015, I Want Revenge's first foal was born at Sunny Oak Farm near Paris, Kentucky: a dark bay or brown colt out of the stakes-winning mare, Silver Nithi.

On July 15, 2017, I Want Revenge was represented by his first winner, a dark bay filly named Brexit Revenge. Running on debut, Brexit Revenge (out of Queens'college Eng, by Bellamy Road) won the fifth race at Monmouth Park by a length at 13:1 odds.

I Want Revenge was sold in the 2018 Keeneland November Breeding Stock Sale as a stallion prospect. He was sold for $10,000 to Jeff Jeans, who moved him to stud in Indiana. It was announced soon after that he would stud the 2019 breeding season at Indiana Stallion Station in Anderson, Indiana, for a fee of $2,000.

I Want Revenge died November 24, 2018, due to a virus likely contracted at the sale.
