= Mining My Own =

American-bred Thoroughbred racehorse

- Sire: Smart Strike
- Grandsire: Mr. Prospector
- Dam: Aspenelle
- Damsire: Vice Regent
- Sex: Mare
- Foaled: February 9, 2001
- Country: United States
- Colour: Chestnut
- Breeder: Lamantia, Blackburn, & Needham/Betz Thoroughbreds
- Owner: Lamantia, Blackburn, & Needham/Betz Thoroughbreds
- Record: Unraced
- Earnings: N/A

Mining My Own (foaled February 9, 2001, in Kentucky) is an American thoroughbred mare racehorse. She is out of the Canadian mare Aspenelle, by the sire Smart Strike. She shares the same sire as 2007 Preakness Stakes winner Curlin, who became 2007 and 2008 American Horse of the Year.

Although unraced due to two leg fractures, Mining My Own is best known as the dam of 2009 Kentucky Derby winner Mine That Bird, who was her first foal.

In 2009, Mining My Own produced a chestnut colt by sire Even the Score who was later named Dullahan

== Resources ==
- Pedigree & Partial Stats
