= Gabriel Saez =

Panamanian horse racing jockey (born 1988)

Personal information
- Born: February 1, 1988 (age 38) Port Darien, Panama
- Occupation: Jockey

Horse racing career
- Sport: Horse racing
- Career wins: 116 (2007, 2008)

Major racing wins
- Matron Stakes (2007); Fair Grounds Oaks (2008); Allaire duPont Distaff Stakes (2008); Delaware Oaks (2008); Endine Stakes (2008); Amsterdam Stakes (2008); Alabama Stakes (2008); Kentucky Oaks (2008); Mineshaft Handicap (2009); Risen Star Stakes (2009); Louisiana Derby (2009); Monmouth Oaks (2009); Del Mar Oaks (2011); Boiling Springs Stakes (2011); Obeah Stakes (2011)

Significant horses
- Eight Belles, Kodiak Kowboy, Proud Spell, Friesan Fire, Havre de Grace, Summer Soiree
- Updated on July 28, 2008

Gabriel Saez (born February 1, 1988, in Port Darien, Panama) is a Panamanian horse racing jockey. He began his riding career in his native country in 2004, becoming the leading apprentice jockey in 2005. Saez moved to the United States in February 2006, and almost instantly became Delaware Park Racetrack's leading jockey that same year. He won his first race as an apprentice in the U.S., and then his first race as a journeyman.

== Career ==
=== 2008 ===
Gabriel rode Eight Belles in the 2008 Kentucky Derby and came under sharp criticism when Eight Belles was euthanized after she'd crossed the finish line, a very game second to Big Brown. During the post-race gallop-out, she collapsed due to fractures in both front ankles. In a letter to the Kentucky Racing Authority, PETA claimed that the horse was "doubtlessly" injured during the race, and therefore Saez bore some responsibility for the injury and euthanization.

Eight Belles' trainer, Larry Jones, has vigorously defended Saez, saying, "We have photographs 50 to 70 yards from where this happened, and the horse had her ears up . . . If this horse had anything going on with her at the time, she didn't know it. If the horse never had a clue, there's no way the jockey could have had a clue."

The Kentucky Horse Racing Authority did not find any evidence of wrongdoing by Saez.

Saez won the horseraceinsider.com "I've Got Your PETA Right Here Insider Award" in 2008 for achieving a redemptive moment with his dramatically heady victory aboard Eclipse finalist Proud Spell in Saratoga's Alabama Stakes.

The day before the Kentucky Derby, Saez rode Proud Spell to a win in the Kentucky Oaks.

=== 2009 ===
Saez entered the 2009 Kentucky Derby aboard prerace favorite Friesan Fire and finished 18th. At the 2009 Preakness Stakes, Saez again jockeyed Friesan Fire, and finished 10th.

=== Year-end charts ===
Chart (2008–present)	Peak position
National Earnings List for Jockeys 2008	34
National Earnings List for Jockeys 2009	65
National Earnings List for Jockeys 2010	83
National Earnings List for Jockeys 2011	82
National Earnings List for Jockeys 2014	88
National Earnings List for Jockeys 2015	85
