= Seeking the Soul =

American thoroughbred racehorse

- Breed: Thoroughbred
- Sire: Perfect Soul
- Grandsire: Sadler's Wells
- Dam: Seeking the Title
- Damsire: Seeking the Gold
- Sex: Stallion
- Foaled: May 4, 2013
- Died: February 28, 2025
- Country: United States
- Color: Bay
- Breeder: Charles E. Fipke
- Owner: Charles E. Fipke
- Trainer: Dallas Stewart
- Record: 27:7-6-7
- Earnings: $3,470,153

Major wins
- Clark Handicap (2017); Ack Ack Stakes (2018); Stephen Foster Handicap (2019)

Seeking the Soul (May 4, 2013 – February 28, 2025) was an American Thoroughbred racehorse owned by Canadian geologist Charles Fipke whose most important win came in the 2017 Grade 1 Clark Handicap.

== Career ==
On February 20, 2016, Seeking the Soul debuted at the Fair Grounds Race Course, coming in second place.

Although he had mixed results in smaller races throughout 2016 and 2017, while competing in an allowance race at Keeneland on October 21, 2017, Seeking the Soul set a new track record of 1:41.36 for a mile and one-sixteenth on dirt. A month later, on November 24, he won the Grade 1 Clark Handicap 2017

His next major win came on September 29, 2018, at the Ack Ack Stakes.

Seeking the Soul finished second in both the 2018 Breeders' Cup Dirt Mile and the 2019 Pegasus World Cup.

On June 15, 2019, he won the 2019 Stephen Foster Handicap and was ranked 3rd on the North American Thoroughbred Racing Starters Earnings Leaderboard in August 2019.

== Pedigree ==
Pedigree of Seeking the Soul (USA), 2013
Sire Perfect Soul(IRE) 1998	Sadler's Wells (USA); 1981	Northern Dancer	Nearctic
Sire Perfect Soul(IRE) 1998	Sadler's Wells (USA); 1981	Northern Dancer	Natalma
Sire Perfect Soul(IRE) 1998	Sadler's Wells (USA); 1981	Fairy Bridge	Bold Reason
Sire Perfect Soul(IRE) 1998	Sadler's Wells (USA); 1981	Fairy Bridge	Special
Sire Perfect Soul(IRE) 1998	Ball Chairman (USA); 1988	Secretariat	Bold Ruler
Sire Perfect Soul(IRE) 1998	Ball Chairman (USA); 1988	Secretariat	Somethingroyal
Sire Perfect Soul(IRE) 1998	Ball Chairman (USA); 1988	A Status Symbol	Exclusive Native
Sire Perfect Soul(IRE) 1998	Ball Chairman (USA); 1988	A Status Symbol	Queen Louis
Dam Seeking the Title (USA) 2007	Seeking the Gold (USA); 1985	Mr. Prospector	Raise a Native
Dam Seeking the Title (USA) 2007	Seeking the Gold (USA); 1985	Mr. Prospector	Gold Digger
Dam Seeking the Title (USA) 2007	Seeking the Gold (USA); 1985	Con Game	Buckpasser
Dam Seeking the Title (USA) 2007	Seeking the Gold (USA); 1985	Con Game	Broadway
Dam Seeking the Title (USA) 2007	Title Seeker (USA); 2003	Monarchos	Maria's Mon
Dam Seeking the Title (USA) 2007	Title Seeker (USA); 2003	Monarchos	Regal Band
Dam Seeking the Title (USA) 2007	Title Seeker (USA); 2003	Personal Ensign	Private Account
Dam Seeking the Title (USA) 2007	Title Seeker (USA); 2003	Personal Ensign	Grecian Banner (family: 6-a)
