= Kentucky Derby Challenge Stakes =

Discontinued horse race in Great Britain

- Class: Class 2 Conditions
- Location: Kempton Park Racecourse; Sunbury-on-Thames, Surrey; England (United Kingdom)
- Inaugurated: 2009
- Final run: 2009
- Race type: Thoroughbred - Flat racing
- Website: www.thejockeyclub.co.uk/kempton/

Race information
- Distance: 1 mile 1 furlong (1 1/8 miles, app. 1800 metres)
- Surface: Polytrack
- Track: right-handed
- Qualification: Three-year-olds
- Weight: 9 st 3 lb
- Purse: US$150,000
- Bonuses: US$100,000 conditional to the winner

The Kentucky Derby Challenge Stakes was an English Thoroughbred horse race intended to become an annual race, but was run only once on 18 March 2009 at Kempton Park Racecourse in Sunbury-on-Thames, Surrey. Open to three-year-old horses, it was raced clockwise at a distance of nine furlongs (1 1/8 miles, app. 1800 metres) on Polytrack.

The winner of the race was guaranteed one of the twenty starting spots in the 1 1/4 mile (10 furlongs) 2009 Kentucky Derby held on the first Saturday in May on the dirt track at Churchill Downs in Louisville, Kentucky. The race offered a purse of US$150,000 of which $90,000 came from Churchill Downs and $60,000 from Kempton. In addition, if the race winner exercised their right to run in the Kentucky Derby, they would receive a further $100,000 bonus payment plus would be given an automatic spot in the ensuing two legs of the U.S. Triple Crown series, the Preakness and Belmont Stakes.

No European-based horse has ever won the Kentucky Derby.

The 2010 race was suspended and the 2009 winner, Mafaaz did not run in the Kentucky Derby, although he did run in the Blue Grass Stakes.

== Winners ==
Year	Winner	Jockey	Trainer	Owner	Time
2009	Mafaaz	Richard Hills	John Gosden	Hamdan Al Maktoum	1:55.17
