= Michael Baze =

American jockey (1987–2011)

Michael Carl Baze
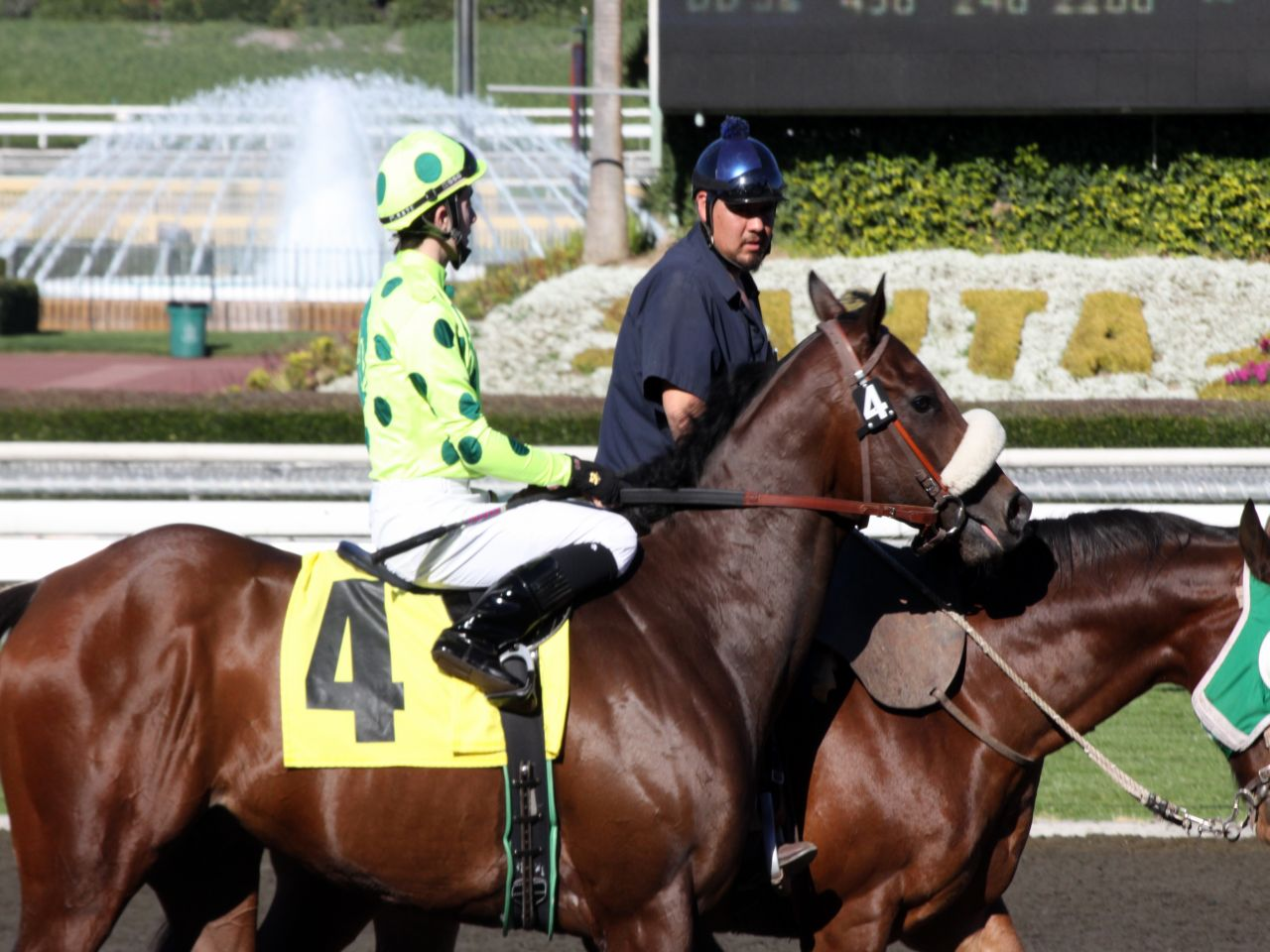
- Baze riding Big Bad Al in 2009

Personal information
- Born: April 14, 1987 Renton, Washington, U.S.
- Died: May 10, 2011 (aged 24)
- Occupation: Jockey

Horse racing career
- Sport: Horse racing
- Career wins: 918

Major racing wins
- Carleton F. Burke Handicap (2006); Borderland Derby (2006); Las Flores Handicap (2007); Oak Tree Mile Stakes (2007); American Invitational Handicap (2007); Best Pal Stakes (2007); Wilshire Handicap (2007); San Diego Handicap (2007); California Cup Matron (2007); California Cup Classic (2008); Borderland Derby (2009); Potrero Grande Handicap(2009); Sorrento Stakes (2009)

Significant horses
- Salute the Sarge; Mi Sueno

Michael Carl Baze (April 14, 1987 – May 10, 2011) was an American Thoroughbred horse racing jockey.

== Family background ==
He grew up in a family with an extensive history in the sport of racing. His father was a jockey who rode primarily at tracks in the Pacific Northwest and his uncle Gary Baze is a member of the Washington Racing Hall of Fame. Baze was also a cousin to jockey Tyler Baze and a second cousin to U.S. Racing Hall of Fame inductee Russell Baze.

== Riding career ==
Baze obtained his jockey's license in 2003 and began riding in California before heading to the east coast of the United States later that year where he met with success at Monmouth Park Racetrack in New Jersey. In 2006, he returned to a base in southern California and the following year was his breakout year when he was the leading rider at the Hollywood Park Racetrack spring/summer season and at the Del Mar Racetrack.

== Death ==
On May 10, 2011, Baze's body was found inside his Cadillac Escalade in the stable area of Churchill Downs in Louisville, Kentucky. The next day it was reported that a preliminary autopsy found no natural cause of death and that toxicology test results would not be available for three weeks. It was also reported that Baze was scheduled to appear in court in Louisville on a cocaine possession charge. (Baze never was a jockey in the Kentucky Derby, including the running three days before his death.)

On June 3, 2011, deputy Jefferson County coroner Jim Wesley reported that Michael Baze died of an accidental overdose. Toxicology results in the autopsy found cocaine and the prescription painkiller oxymorphone, also known as opana, in the rider's system. Levels of the drugs were not released. The official cause of death is listed as multiple substance intoxication, which the deputy coroner said is an overdose.

== Aftermath ==
Baze's mother, Teri Gibson, sued Baze's estranged wife Kelly on Judge Judy for funeral expenses and travel expenses for her and her son. Judge Judith Sheindlin awarded Gibson $855 for cremation expenses but disagreed that Kelly Baze owed her for travel expenses. During the episode, it was also revealed that Baze had received $750,000 from her late husband's life insurance policy, while Gibson had received $250,000. The episode aired on May 23, 2012.

=== Year-end charts ===
Chart (2006–2010)	Peak position
National Earnings List for Jockeys 2006	83
National Earnings List for Jockeys 2007	17
National Earnings List for Jockeys 2008	40
National Earnings List for Jockeys 2009	74
National Earnings List for Jockeys 2010	60
