= Pants On Fire (horse) =

American Thoroughbred racehorse

- Sire: Jump Start
- Grandsire: A.P. Indy
- Dam: Cabo de Noche
- Damsire: Cape Town
- Sex: Stallion
- Foaled: 2008
- Country: United States
- Colour: Dark bay or brown
- Breeder: K & G Stables
- Owner: George & Lori Hall
- Trainer: Kelly Breen
- Record: 35: 11-5-8
- Earnings: $1,641,375

Major wins
- Louisiana Derby (2011); Pegasus Stakes (2011); Skip Away Stakes (2012); Monmouth Cup (2013); Ack Ack Handicap (2013); Wild and Wonderful Stakes (2014, 2015); Sir Shackleton Stakes (2015)
- Last updated on July 18, 2017

Pants On Fire (foaled on March 20, 2008) is an American Thoroughbred racehorse. A seven-time stakes winner, his biggest win came in the 2011 Louisiana Derby.

== Background ==
Bred in Kentucky by K & G Stables, Pants On Fire is sired by Jump Start, a graded stakes winning son of A.P. Indy. Jump Start is also known as the sire of millionaires Prayer for Relief and Rail Trip. Pants On Fire's dam, Cabo de Noche, is a half-sister to stakes winners Key Hunter and Hatfield.

Pants On Fire was named for his sire's alleged "below the belt passions" in the breeding shed. He was owned by George and Lori Hall, who also owned Pants On Fire's "rival", 2011 Belmont Stakes winner Ruler on Ice.

== Racing career ==
=== 2010: Two-year-old season ===
Trained by Kelly Breen, Pants On Fire ran four times as a juvenile, breaking his maiden in his third start.

=== 2011: Three-year-old season ===
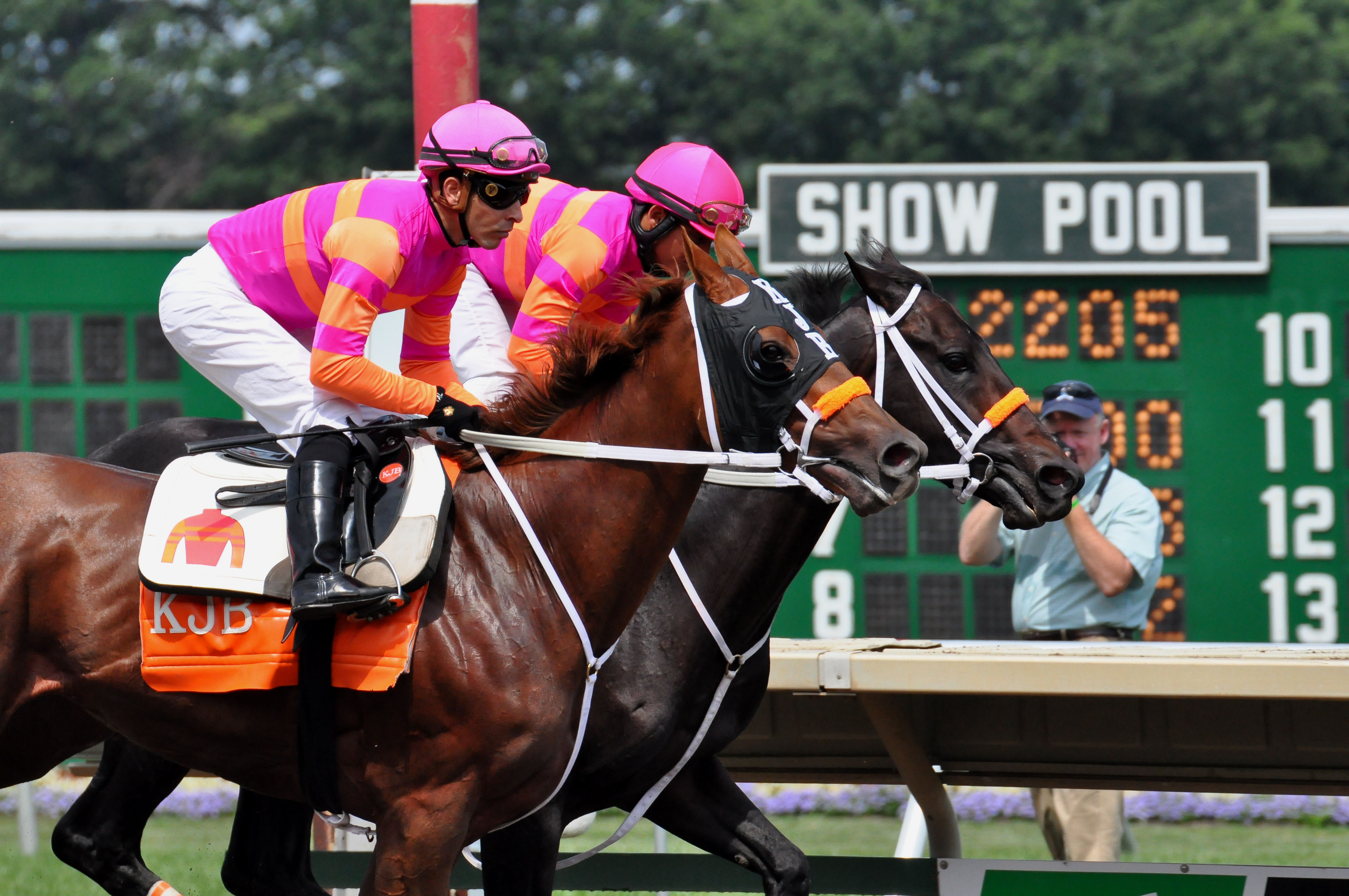
Pants on Fire on the inside Ruler on Ice on the outside

Pants On Fire ran third in the Count Fleet Stakes in his sophomore debut. He then finished second in the Lecomte Stakes and sixth in the Risen Star Stakes, before securing his first graded stakes win in the Louisiana Derby.

He finished 9th in the 2011 Kentucky Derby at odds of 20-1.

Pants on Fire followed his disappointing Derby with a win in the Pegasus Stakes. He closed out his three-year-old season with a fifth in the Haskell Invitational.

=== 2012-2015: Later racing career ===
Pants on Fire began his 2012 season with a win in an allowance race. From there, he ran in four stakes races. He finished fifth in the New Orleans Handicap and sixth in the Charles Town Classic, then won the Skip Away Stakes, which was ungraded that year. He ended his season with a sixth in the ungraded Delta Mile.

Pants On Fire opened his five-year-old season with a third-place finish in the 2013 grade III Hal's Hope Stakes, and a win in an allowance race. He then ran third in the Skip Away Stakes, which was then a graded race, and ran the same in the Mountainview Handicap. He won his next two races- the Ack Ack Handicap and the Gr.II Monmouth Cup Stakes. He finished a disappointing seventh in the Breeders' Cup Dirt Mile. Pannts On Fire then was shipped to Japan to contest the Japan Cup Dirt at Hanshin Racecourse. He finished sixteenth.

After returning from Japan, Pants On Fire took an eight-month layoff from racing. He returned in the 2014 Monmouth Cup to defend his title, but ran third to Valid and winner Bradester. He followed this run with a third in the Philip H. Iselin Breeders' Cup Handicap and a second-place finish in the Left Bank Stakes. He returned to the winner's circle in the Wild and Wonderful Stakes at Charles Town. He returned to the Breeders' Cup to run in the Dirt Mile, and ran a distant third behind Tapiture and winner Goldencents, who both battled gamely. He closed out 2014 year with a third-place finish in the Harlan's Holiday Stakes.

As a seven-year-old, Pants On Fire found the winner's circle again in the Sir Shackleton Stakes for his 2015 debut, and followed his win with a third-place run in the Churchill Downs Stakes. He next contested the Metropolitan Handicap, only to run seventh, and then ran fifth in the Monmouth Cup. He won the Wild and Wonderful Stakes in his final start.

Pants on Fire retired with a lifetime record of 35:11-5-8 with earnings of $1,641,375.

== Retirement ==
Pants On Fire was sent to stand stallion duties beginning in 2016 at Diamond B Farm, owned by Glenn and Becky Brok in Mohrsville, Pennsylvania. Standing alongside stallions Uptowncharlybrown and Got the Last Laugh, Pants On Fire's initial stud fee was set at $5,000.

Pants On Fire did not breed any mares his first season, as he showed no interest in breeding. He was sent to Dubai for some time off, and will return when he begins to show interest in mares.
