= Mine That Bird =

American-bred Thoroughbred racehorse

- Mine That Bird at Santa Anita Park in October 2008
- Sire: Birdstone
- Grandsire: Grindstone
- Dam: Mining My Own
- Damsire: Smart Strike
- Sex: Gelding
- Foaled: May 10, 2006 (age 20)
- Country: United States
- Colour: Bay
- Breeder: Lamantia Blackburn & Needham/Betz Thoroughbreds
- Owner: 1) Dominion Bloodstock, D. Ball and HGHR Inc. 2) Double Eagle Ranch and Buena Suerte Equine
- Trainer: 1) David Cotey; 2) Richard Mandella; 3) Bennie L. "Chip" Woolley, Jr. 4) D. Wayne Lukas
- Record: 18: 5-2-1
- Earnings: $2,228,637

Major wins
- Silver Deputy Stakes (2008); Swynford Stakes (2008); Grey Stakes (2008); Triple Crown Race wins: Kentucky Derby (2009)

Awards
- Canadian Champion 2-yr-old Male Horse (2008)

Honours
- Canadian Horse Racing Hall of Fame (2015)
- Last updated on June 3, 2020

Mine That Bird (foaled May 10, 2006) is a champion American Thoroughbred racehorse who won the 2009 Kentucky Derby at 50-1 odds and came second in the Preakness Stakes and third in the Belmont Stakes. He had earnings of $2,228,637 and was inducted into the Canadian Horse Racing Hall of Fame in 2015.

== Background ==
Mine That Bird was born in Kentucky. His sire is Birdstone (winner of the 2004 Belmont Stakes), and his dam is Mining My Own. He is related to Northern Dancer through both of his parents and is related to Native Dancer and Mr. Prospector on his dam's side.

== Racing career ==
Canadian trainer David Cotey purchased Mine That Bird for $9,500 at the 2007 Fasig-Tipton Kentucky October Yearling Sale. He and his partners raced the gelding at Woodbine Racetrack in Toronto, where he won four of six starts and was voted the 2008 Canadian Champion 2-yr-old Male Horse. Cotey nominated the horse for the Breeders' Cup Juvenile and the Kentucky Derby. Chantal Sutherland rode him to victory in the Silver Deputy Stakes and the Swynford Stakes. After she and the horse won the Grey Stakes on October 11, 2008, the partnership accepted a $400,000 offer from the New Mexico partnership of Double Eagle Ranch and Buena Suerte Equine. His new owners turned the gelding over to U.S. Racing Hall of Fame trainer Richard Mandella. In the 2008 Breeders' Cup Juvenile, Mine That Bird finished last of the twelve starters.

Racing in the United States at age three for new trainer Chip Woolley, in his 2009 debut on February 28, Mine That Bird finished second in the Borderland Derby and on March 29 had a fourth-place finish in the Sunland Derby. Based on his career earnings in graded stakes races, he qualified as one of the twenty Kentucky Derby starters. Woolley, who had a broken foot at the time and was in a cast, loaded Mine That Bird into a horse trailer attached to his pickup truck and drove over 1,200 miles (perhaps 1,700 miles) over 21 hours from New Mexico to get to the race.

=== 2009 Kentucky Derby ===
Following overnight rain, the Churchill Downs natural dirt track was rated as "sloppy" for the 2009 Kentucky Derby. Ridden by Calvin Borel, Mine That Bird had trouble out of the starting gate and was left about eight lengths behind the rest of the field. By the time the pack of horses was running down the backstretch, Mine That Bird was so far back that NBC's announcer Tom Durkin at first missed seeing him.

Calvin Borel, using the ground-saving, rail-skimming riding technique that won him the 2007 Derby with Street Sense, charged past horses along the backstretch and at the turn for home moved into contention. He kept Mine That Bird on the rail, leaving it only briefly to go around one tiring horse, then exploded past Pioneerof the Nile and Musket Man so fast on the inside that Durkin, who was focused on the other two horses, did not see him come through until he was already three lengths in the lead. Mine That Bird pulled away to win by 6 3/4 lengths for the largest margin of victory in over 60 years. He ran the Derby's mile-and-a-quarter distance in 2 minutes 2.66 seconds.

A two-dollar win wager returned $103.20, tying Mine That Bird with Giacomo for the fourth-biggest upset winner in Kentucky Derby history, behind 91-1 longshot Donerail in 1913, 80-1 victor Rich Strike in 2022, and 65-1 winner Country House in 2019. Mine That Bird had the third longest odds in the 19-horse field, with only Atomic Rain (55-1) and Join in the Dance (51-1) being higher.

=== 2009 Preakness Stakes ===
The day after the Derby win, Mine That Bird's connections were uncertain if they would come back two weeks later and try for the Preakness Stakes. They planned to wait and assess the horse's condition first.

Co-owner Mark Allen said, "The plan was that if he showed something here, to skip the Preakness and go to the Belmont, like his dad." His sire Birdstone won the Belmont Stakes in 2004, suggesting that Mine That Bird's breeding is for longer distances. Trainer Chip Woolley was concerned that the Preakness tends to have a quick pace that might not benefit his horse as much as the Belmont.

It was announced on May 4, 2009, on ESPN that Mine That Bird would run in the Preakness.

Borel opted to ride his regular mount, the filly Rachel Alexandra, in the Preakness. She had won the Kentucky Oaks by 20 lengths with Borel aboard and was the favorite in the Preakness. The mount on Mine That Bird went to Mike Smith. Mine That Bird finished second, a length behind Rachel Alexandra. As with the Derby, he came from far back in the field on the final turn and was closing rapidly, but the finish line came before he could catch the filly.

=== 2009 Belmont Stakes ===
Mine That Bird ran in the Belmont Stakes on June 6, 2009, where he was again ridden by Borel. After starting last, he began moving up along the backside. After taking the lead at the top of the stretch, he battled with Dunkirk and Charitable Man down the lane but was beaten by Summer Bird (also sired by Birdstone) and Dunkirk to finish third.

=== Subsequent races ===
Mine That Bird returned to racing with a 3rd-place finish in the West Virginia Derby on August 1, 2009. He then finished 9th in the 2009 Breeders' Cup Classic on November 7, 2009.

== New Mexico Horse of the Year ==
On February 11, 2010, Mine That Bird was unanimously voted New Mexico Horse of the Year for 2009 by the New Mexico State House of Representatives. The bill was introduced by state representative Candy Spence Ezzell, who explained that "Dr. Leonard Blach and Mark Allen [Mine That Bird's owners] have brought New Mexico positive worldwide recognition." Dr. Blach, who was present for the proceedings, received a standing ovation from House members.

On May 19, 2010, Mine That Bird was transferred to Hall of Fame trainer D. Wayne Lukas.

== Pedigree ==
Pedigree of Mine That Bird, Gelding, Bay, 2006
Sire Birdstone	Grindstone	Unbridled	Fappiano
Sire Birdstone	Grindstone	Unbridled	Gana Facil
Sire Birdstone	Grindstone	Buzz My Bell	Drone
Sire Birdstone	Grindstone	Buzz My Bell	Chateaupavia
Sire Birdstone	Dear Birdie	Storm Bird	Northern Dancer*
Sire Birdstone	Dear Birdie	Storm Bird	South Ocean
Sire Birdstone	Dear Birdie	Hush Dear	Silent Screen
Sire Birdstone	Dear Birdie	Hush Dear	You All
Dam Mining My Own	Smart Strike	Mr Prospector	Raise A Native
Dam Mining My Own	Smart Strike	Mr Prospector	Gold Digger
Dam Mining My Own	Smart Strike	Classy 'n Smart	Smarten
Dam Mining My Own	Smart Strike	Classy 'n Smart	No Class
Dam Mining My Own	Aspenelle	Vice Regent	Northern Dancer*
Dam Mining My Own	Aspenelle	Vice Regent	Victoria Regina
Dam Mining My Own	Aspenelle	Little to Do	Dynastic
Dam Mining My Own	Aspenelle	Little to Do	Tribal to Do

* Mine That Bird is inbred 4s x 4d to the stallion Northern Dancer, meaning that he appears in the fourth generation of his pedigree once on the sire side and once on the dam side.

== In popular culture ==
This story was made into a movie, 50 to 1, that was released on March 21, 2014. It stars Skeet Ulrich, Christian Kane and William Devane.

On the penultimate episode of The Tonight Show with Conan O'Brien, which aired on January 21, 2010, host Conan O'Brien claimed that The Tonight Show had purchased Mine That Bird for a comedy bit at the expense of NBC. A chestnut horse which O'Brien introduced as Mine That Bird was brought out in a (supposedly) mink Snuggie and watched what O'Brien stated to be "restricted footage of NFL Super Bowl highlights". O'Brien stated the cost of the bit was $4.8 million.

Rapper Lil Wayne makes a reference to the horse in his track "Always Strapped" Official Remix (Part 2).

Mine That Bird was featured in This American Life episode 398: "Long Shot."

Mine That Bird's owner Mark Allen plays a role in the true-crime drama Practice to Deceive by Ann Rule.
