= Bennie L. Woolley Jr. =

American horse trainer

Chip Woolley
Personal information
- Born: December 21, 1963 (age 62) Raton, New Mexico, United States
- Occupation: Horse trainer

Horse racing career
- Sport: Horse racing
- Career wins: 295+ (ongoing)

Major racing wins
- American Classic Race wins: Kentucky Derby (2009)

Significant horses
- Mine That Bird

Bennie L. "Chip" Woolley Jr. (born December 21, 1963, in Raton, New Mexico) is an American Thoroughbred horse racing trainer best known for conditioning the 2009 winner of the Kentucky Derby. One of the five children of Ann and Bennie Woolley Sr., he grew up in Dalhart, Texas, where his parents lived until 2019, when his father died and his mother moved to Amarillo, Texas. After graduating high school he studied for two years at Frank Phillips College in Borger, Texas. At age twenty he moved back to New Mexico to pursue a career in the horse racing industry.

An accomplished rider who often exercises his own horses, Chip Woolley has operated a public stable since 1991. Based at Sunland Park Racetrack in Sunland Park, New Mexico, he trains both Quarter Horses and Thoroughbreds for flat racing.

In late 2008, the New Mexico racing partnership of Mark Allen (Double Eagle Ranch) and Dr. Leonard Blach (Buena Suerte Equine) turned over a gelding named Mine That Bird to the care of Chip Woolley. The horse had won four straight races in Canada but ran last in the October 25 Breeders' Cup Juvenile in his debut for his new American owners. Making his debut for Woolley on February 28, 2009, Mine That Bird finished second in the Borderland Derby and on March 29 had a fourth-place finish in the Sunland Derby. However, based on his career earnings in graded stakes races, he qualified as one of the twenty Kentucky Derby starters. Trainer Chip Woolley loaded Mine That Bird into a horse trailer attached to a 2008 Ford F-450 pickup truck, and drove 1,700 miles over 21 hours from New Mexico to get to the big race.

Under jockey Calvin Borel, Mine That Bird won the Kentucky Derby, instantly making Chip Woolley one of the most talked about racing personalities in America. The horse was then loaded into his trailer and driven by Woolley to Pimlico Race Course in Baltimore, Maryland. Under jockey Mike Smith, Mine That Bird came from last through difficult traffic to earn a second-place finish in the Preakness Stakes. Following the race, Chip Woolley announced that the horse's owners would be sending him to Belmont Park in Elmont, New York, for the third leg of the U.S. Triple Crown series, the Belmont Stakes, where he placed third.

In 2011, a book was published on him in French and English.
