= Calvin Borel =

American jockey (born 1966)

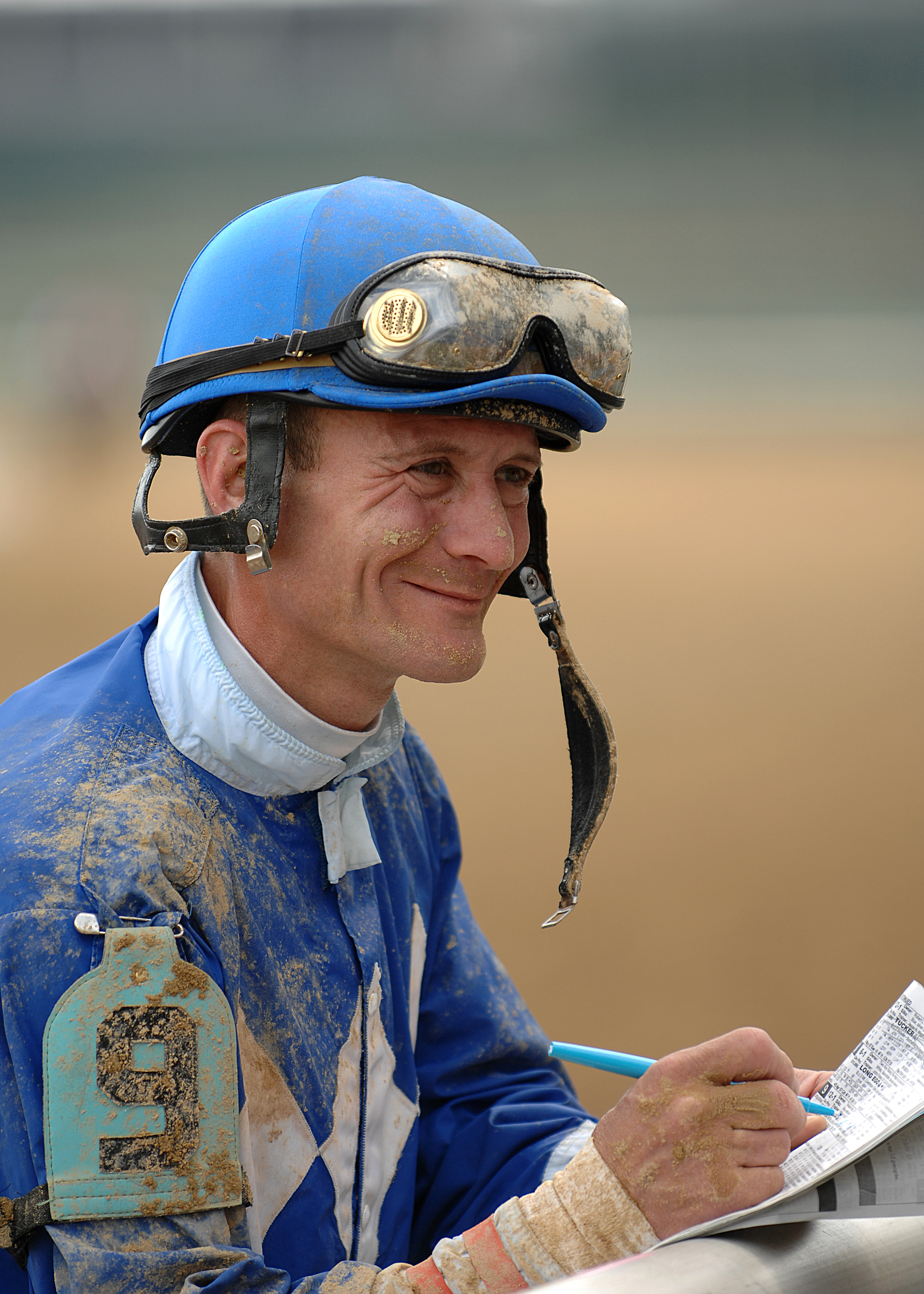

Personal information
- Born: November 7, 1966 (age 59) St. Martinville, Louisiana, United States
- Occupation: Jockey

Horse racing career
- Sport: Horse racing
- Career wins: 5,146+ (ongoing)

Major racing wins
- Super Derby (1991); Arkansas Derby (1993); Count Fleet (1989, 1995); Falls City Handicap (1996, 1999, 2003, 2007, 2008); Apple Blossom Handicap (1997, 2001); Fleur de Lis Handicap (1997, 2009, 2010); Essex Handicap (1998, 2007); Clark Handicap (1999); Kentucky Cup Classic Handicap (1999); Bashford Manor Stakes (2000, 2008); Oaklawn Handicap (2000); Bourbon Stakes (2002); Silverbulletday Stakes (2003); Ack Ack Handicap (1996, 1998, 1999); Stephen Foster Handicap (2006); Amsterdam (2006); Tampa Bay Derby (2007); Travers Stakes (2007); Sword Dancer (2007); Alabama Stakes (2007); Jim Dandy Stakes (2007); Razorback Breeders' Cup Handicap (2008); Golden Rod Stakes (2002, 2008); Hal's Hope Handicap (2009); Fair Grounds Oaks (2009); Fantasy Stakes (2009); Kentucky Oaks (2009); Louisville Stakes (2009); Haskell Invitational (2009); Woodward Stakes (2009); Mother Goose Stakes (2009); Kentucky Jockey Club Stakes (2000, 2008, 2009); Derby Trial (2010); Colonel E.R. Bradley Handicap (1992, 1993, 1994); Churchill Downs Distaff Handicap (1998, 1999, 2003); Delaware Oaks (1998); Louisville Distaff Stakes (1999, 2004, 2007, 2009); Florida Derby (2012); West Virginia Governor's Stakes (2013) American Classics wins: Kentucky Derby (2007, 2009, 2010); Preakness Stakes (2009); Breeders' Cup wins: Breeders' Cup Juvenile (2006)

Racing awards
- George Woolf Memorial Jockey Award (2010)

Honours
- Arkansas Sports Hall of Fame (2011); National Museum of Racing and Hall of Fame (2013)

Significant horses
- Seek Gold, Street Sense, Delightful Kiss; Rachel Alexandra, Mine That Bird, Brass Hat, Miss Isella, Super Saver

Calvin H. Borel (born November 7, 1966) is an American jockey in thoroughbred horse racing and rode the victorious mount in the 2007 Kentucky Derby, the 2009 Kentucky Derby and the 2010 Kentucky Derby. His 2009 Derby win with Mine That Bird was the third biggest upset in Derby history, (after Donerail and Rich Strike), and Borel's winning margin of 6 3/4 lengths was the greatest in Derby history since Assault won by 8 lengths in 1946. On May 1, 2009, Borel won the Kentucky Oaks aboard Rachel Alexandra, only the second time since 1993 that a jockey has won the Oaks-Derby combo, and just the seventh time overall a jockey has accomplished this feat in the same year. On May 16, 2009, Borel won the 2009 Preakness Stakes at Pimlico with thoroughbred filly Rachel Alexandra. In doing so, Borel became the first jockey to win the first two jewels of the Triple Crown on different mounts. Borel's nickname is "Bo'rail'" due to his penchant for riding close to the rail to save ground. Borel came out of retirement in September, 2025 https://www.cantonrep.com/embed/video/88904910/

== Life and career ==
Calvin Borel hails from south Louisiana: the heart of Cajun Country and famous for having produced a number of top jockeys, such as Randy Romero, Kent Desormeaux, Eddie Delahoussaye and Shane Sellers. Borel began racing horses in the bush tracks near his hometown of Catahoula and started riding in match races at the age of eight. He is known for his Cajun accent and bubbly and emotional personality, both of which were on full display during his post-victory interview after all three of his Kentucky Derby wins.

Borel's older brother, Cecil, had a brief career as a thoroughbred jockey but was not able to maintain his weight. He turned to training horses at Delta Downs in Vinton, Louisiana. Calvin began his professional riding career at Delta Downs.

Over a career spanning 25 years, Borel has become known for his tireless work ethic as well as an ability to slip up the rail to save ground. His colleagues and racing fans therefore frequently refer to him as "Calvin Bo-rail".

Borel is 5 ft 4 in (1.63 m) and 116 pounds (53 kg). He lives in Louisville, Kentucky. His riding career began to surge in June 2006 when he won the $750,000 Stephen Foster Handicap at Churchill Downs with 91–1 longshot Seek Gold, getting up in the final stride to win by a nose over Perfect Drift and paying $185.40 to win. That year was his big break when he won his first Breeders' Cup on Street Sense in the Breeders' Cup Juvenile.

Borel then won the 2007 Kentucky Derby aboard Street Sense, guiding the colt to a 2 1/4 length victory over Hard Spun. He next had a close second-place finish aboard Street Sense in the Preakness Stakes to Curlin.

On July 5, 2007, Borel became the sixth jockey in the history of Churchill Downs to win six races on a single race card. With his victory in the July 5, 2008 Bashford Manor Stakes, he became the thirty-fourth jockey in North American Thoroughbred racing history to win 4,500 races.

May 2, 2009, saw Borel win the Kentucky Derby on Mine That Bird, a 50–1 long shot, a day after winning the Kentucky Oaks aboard favorite Rachel Alexandra. It was only the second time since 1993 that a jockey has won the Oaks-Derby combo, and he was just the seventh jockey overall to accomplish this feat in the same year.

On May 16, 2009, Borel won the Preakness Stakes on Rachel Alexandra (after that horse was sold following the Derby). This accomplishment marked the first time that a jockey won the first two legs of the Triple Crown on different horses, and Borel, with a win in the Belmont, could become the first Triple Crown winner since Steve Cauthen accomplished it in 1978 on Affirmed. A win would have made him only the second individual to win the Triple Crown by sweeping the races with different horses (D. Wayne Lukas, a trainer, also did so in 1995). However, on June 6, 2009, Borel finished third on Mine That Bird in the Belmont Stakes, failing to accomplish a jockey Triple Crown.

On June 27, 2009, he guided Rachel Alexandra to a 19 1/4 victory in the Mother Goose Stakes at Belmont Park, setting a new stakes record, the only horse to break a record held by the great filly Ruffian. Borel then rode her to a six-length victory over Belmont Stakes winner Summer Bird in the Haskell Invitational.

On September 5 of the same year, he rode Rachel Alexandra to a historic victory in the Woodward Stakes. It was the first time a filly of any age had won that storied race.

Borel was named the winner of the 2010 George Woolf Memorial Jockey Award.

On May 1, 2010, he rode Super Saver to win his 3rd Kentucky Derby in a 4-year span, the first jockey ever to do so. After winning the race, Borel promised he would win the Triple Crown in 2010 but he lost the Preakness.

On June 4, 2010, Borel became only the second jockey to win 1,000 career races at Churchill Downs, joining Hall of Famer Pat Day.

On March 7, 2013, Borel earned his 5,000th victory at Oaklawn Park in Hot Springs, Arkansas while riding Hezunusual in the 6th race. He dedicated the win to his agent of over 20 years, Jerry Hissam who retired that year due to chronic pancreas issues after undergoing gall bladder surgery. Borel is the 26th North American jockey to reach 5000 victories.

Borel was inducted into the Arkansas Sports Hall of Fame in 2011 and to the National Museum of Racing and Hall of Fame in 2013.

Borel played himself in the 2014 feature film 50 to 1, about Mine that Bird's 2009 Kentucky Derby win.

On March 30, 2016, Borel announced he would be retiring from horse racing. However, on August 15, he came out of retirement.

== Legal issues ==
On August 20, 2011, Borel was arrested in Evansville, Indiana for allegedly driving while intoxicated.

On August 26, 2019, Borel was arrested in Corydon, Indiana for allegedly driving while intoxicated after police saw him driving the wrong way on a street.

== Riding titles ==
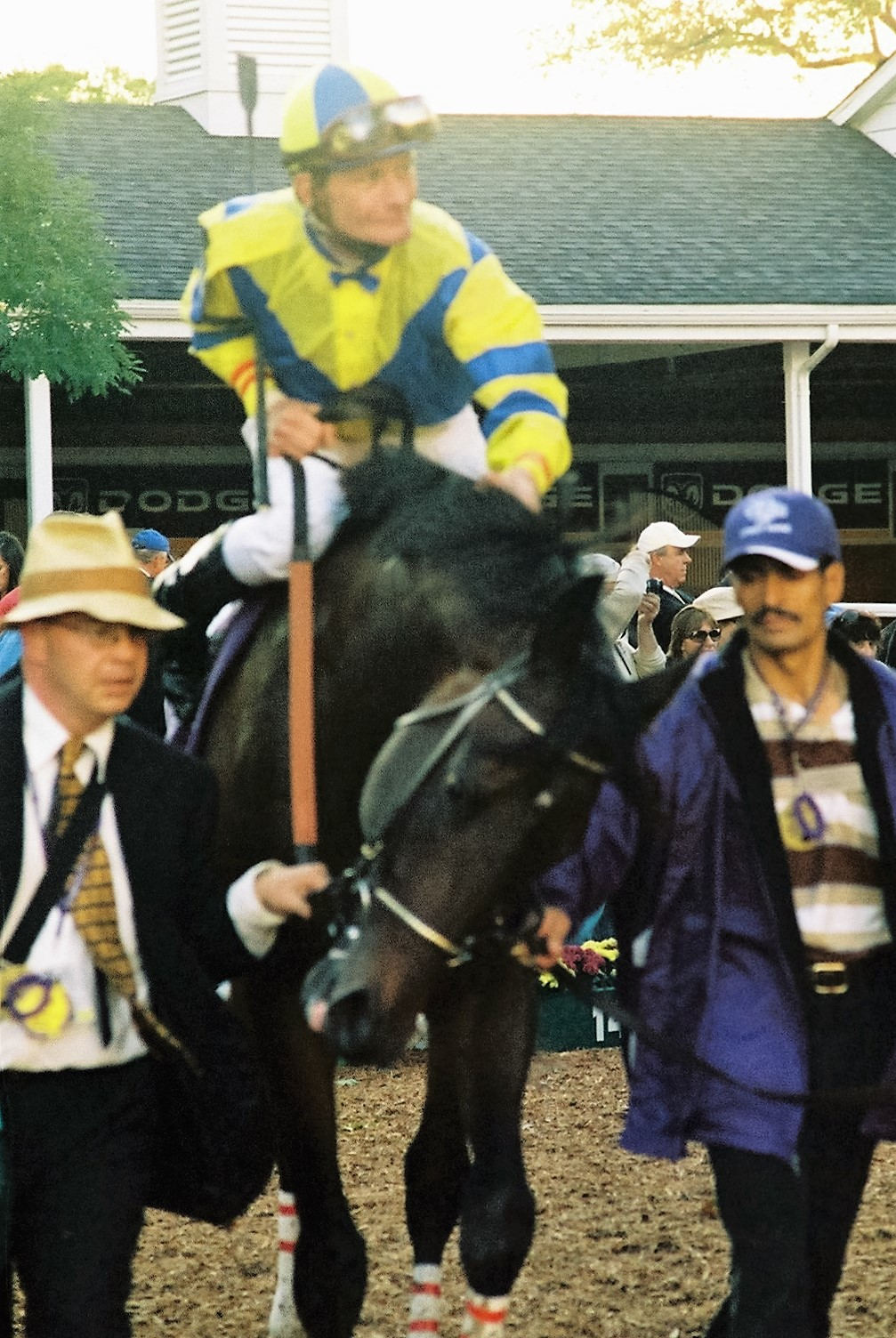
Borel on Street Sense, 2007

- Delta Downs (1985, 1986, 1987)
- Louisiana Downs (1991, 1992, 1994)
- Oaklawn Park (1995, 2001)
- Ellis Park (1995, 2011)
- Churchill Downs Fall meet (1999, 2006, 2009), Spring meet (2010)
- Turfway Park (2000)
- Kentucky Downs (2005)

=== Year-end charts ===
Chart (2000–present)	Peak position
National Earnings List for Jockeys 2000	43
National Earnings List for Jockeys 2001	35
National Earnings List for Jockeys 2002	34
National Earnings List for Jockeys 2003	41
National Earnings List for Jockeys 2004	54
National Earnings List for Jockeys 2005	73
National Earnings List for Jockeys 2006	30
National Earnings List for Jockeys 2007	17
National Earnings List for Jockeys 2008	50
National Earnings List for Jockeys 2009	15
National Earnings List for Jockeys 2010	26
National Earnings List for Jockeys 2011	71
National Earnings List for Jockeys 2012	89
