= Louisiana Derby =

Grade II thoroughbred horse race

- Class: Grade II
- Location: Fair Grounds Race Course; New Orleans, Louisiana
- Inaugurated: 1894
- Race type: Thoroughbred – Flat racing
- Website: www.fairgroundsracecourse.com

Race information
- Distance: 1 3/16 miles
- Surface: Dirt
- Track: left-handed
- Qualification: Three-year-olds
- Weight: 122 lbs.
- Purse: $1,000,000

The Louisiana Derby is a Grade II American Thoroughbred horse race run annually at the Fair Grounds Race Course in New Orleans, Louisiana. Run in late March, the race is open to horses, age three, willing to race 1 3/16 miles on the dirt. It currently offers a purse of $1,000,000.

The Louisiana Derby is one of the major prep races on the Road to the Kentucky Derby.

== Race history ==
The first race at the "Louisiana Race Course", now the Fair Grounds Race Course took place spring 1838, proprietors Bernard de Marigny, Julius C. Branch, and Henry Augustine Tayloe – son leading turfman John Tayloe III founder of the Washington (DC) Jockey Club (1789) – offered on the fifth race day "The Louisiana Plate."

A race was held in 1894 and called the Crescent City Derby. The race was later renamed in honor of Fair Grounds' home state, Louisiana.

Two winners of the Louisiana Derby have gone on to win the Kentucky Derby: Black Gold in 1924, and Grindstone in 1996. The 1988 winner, Risen Star, went on to become a "Dual Classic Winner" by winning the Preakness and Belmont Stakes.

=== Race venue ===
The race was held at Crescent City Race Course from 1894 through 1908. It was also held at Jefferson Park from 1920 through 1931. The race was not held in 1895 through 1897, 1909 through 1919, 1921 through 1922, 1940 through 1942, 1945 and 2006. In 2006, the race was cancelled because the track was partially destroyed by Hurricane Katrina.

=== Race distance ===
The race was run at one mile in 1894; it was run at 1 1/8 miles from 1898 until 1988. The race has been run at 1 1/16 miles from 1989 through 2009. On August 11, 2009, the owner of Fair Grounds, Churchill Downs Incorporated, announced that they were moving the Louisiana Derby from eight weeks prior to the Kentucky Derby to only five weeks prior. They also announced that the distance of the Louisiana Derby would be increased back to 1 1/8 miles. Starting in 2020 the Louisiana Derby has been run at the 1 3/16 miles distance.

== Records ==
Speed record:

- 1 1/16 miles – 1:42.60 – Crypto Star (1997)
- 1 1/8 miles – 1:48.80 – Clev Er Tell (1977)
- 1 3/16 miles – 1:54.38 – Epicenter (2022)

Most wins by a jockey:

- 5 – Pat Day (1986, 1987, 1991, 1992, 1997)

Most wins by a trainer: ¹

- 5 – Todd Pletcher (2007, 2010, 2013, 2018, 2023)
- 5 – Steven M. Asmussen (2001, 2008, 2016, 2022, 2025)

Most wins by an owner:

- 4 – Joe W. Brown & Dorothy D. Brown (1949, 1953, 1954, 1965, 1968, 1982)

== Winners ==
| Year | Winner | Jockey | Trainer | Owner | Dist. (Miles) | Time | Purse | Gr. |
|---|---|---|---|---|---|---|---|---|
| 2026 | Emerging Market | Flavien Prat | Chad C. Brown | Klaravich Stables | 1 3/16 M | 1:55.18 | $1,000,000 | II |
| 2025 | Tiztastic | Joel Rosario | Steven M. Asmussen | Mrs. John Magnier, Michael B. Tabor, Derrick Smith & Winchell Thoroughbreds | 1 3/16 M | 1:56.20 | $1,000,000 | II |
| 2024 | Catching Freedom | Flavien Prat | Brad H. Cox | Albaugh Family Stables | 1 3/16 M | 1:56.16 | $1,000,000 | II |
| 2023 | Kingsbarns | Flavien Prat | Todd A. Pletcher | Spendthrift Farm | 1 3/16 M | 1:57.33 | $1,000,000 | II |
| 2022 | Epicenter | Joel Rosario | Steven M. Asmussen | Winchell Thoroughbreds | 1 3/16 M | 1:54.38 | $1,000,000 | II |
| 2021 | Hot Rod Charlie | Joel Rosario | Leandro Mora | Roadrunner Racing, Boat Racing & William Strauss | 1 3/16 M | 1:55.06 | $1,000,000 | II |
| 2020 | Wells Bayou | Florent Geroux | Brad H. Cox | Clint Gasaway, Lance Gasaway, Madaket Stables, & Wonder Stables | 1 3/16 M | 1:56.47 | $1,000,000 | II |
| 2019 | By My Standards | Gabriel Saez | W. Bret Calhoun | Allied Racing Stable | 1 1/8 M | 1:49.53 | $1,000,000 | II |
| 2018 | Noble Indy | John R. Velazquez | Todd A. Pletcher | WinStar Farm | 1 1/8 M | 1:50.28 | $1,000,000 | II |
| 2017 | Girvin | Brian Hernandez Jr. | Joe Sharp | Brad Grady | 1 1/8 M | 1:49.77 | $1,000,000 | II |
| 2016 | Gun Runner | Florent Geroux | Steven M. Asmussen | Winchell Thoroughbreds & Three Chimneys | 1 1/8 M | 1:51.06 | $1,000,000 | II |
| 2015 | International Star | Miguel Mena | Michael Maker | Kenneth & Sarah Ramsey | 1 1/8 M | 1:50.67 | $750,000 | II |
| 2014 | Vicar's in Trouble | Rosie Napravnik | Michael Maker | Kenneth & Sarah Ramsey | 1 1/8 M | 1:50.77 | $1,000,000 | II |
| 2013 | Revolutionary | Javier Castellano | Todd A. Pletcher | WinStar Farm | 1 1/8 M | 1:50.28 | $1,000,000 | II |
| 2012 | Hero of Order | Eddie Martin Jr. | Gennadi Dorochenko | Raut LLC | 1 1/8 M | 1:50.13 | $1,000,000 | II |
| 2011 | Pants on Fire | Rosie Napravnik | Kelly Breen | George & Lori Hall | 1 1/8 M | 1:49.92 | $1,000,000 | II |
| 2010 | Mission Impazible | Rajiv Maragh | Todd A. Pletcher | Twin Creeks Rac.Stable | 1 1/8 M | 1:50.32 | $750,000 | II |
| 2009 | Friesan Fire | Gabriel Saez | J. Larry Jones | Vinery St./Fox Hill Farm | 1 1/16 M | 1:43.46 | $600,000 | II |
| 2008 | Pyro | Sh.Bridgmohan | Steven M. Asmussen | Winchell Thoroughbreds | 1 1/16 M | 1:44.44 | $600,000 | II |
| 2007 | Circular Quay | John R. Velazquez | Todd A. Pletcher | Michael Tabor | 1 1/16 M | 1:43.01 | $600,000 | II |
| 2006 | No Race due to track damage cause by Hurricane Katrina | | | | | | | |
| 2005 | High Limit | Ramon Domínguez | Robert J. Frankel | Gary & Mary West | 1 1/16 M | 1:42.74 | $600,000 | II |
| 2004 | Wimbledon | Javier Santiago | Bob Baffert | James McIngvale | 1 1/16 M | 1:42.71 | $600,000 | II |
| 2003 | Peace Rules | Edgar Prado | Robert J. Frankel | Edmund A. Gann | 1 1/16 M | 1:42.67 | $750,000 | II |
| 2002 | Repent | Jerry D. Bailey | Kenneth G. McPeek | Select Stable | 1 1/16 M | 1:43.86 | $750,000 | II |
| 2001 | Fifty Stars | Donnie Meche | Steven M. Asmussen | J. Cassells / R. Zollars | 1 1/16 M | 1:44.76 | $750,000 | II |
| 2000 | Mighty | Shane Sellers | Frank L. Brothers | Aspiration Stable | 1 1/16 M | 1:43.29 | $750,000 | II |
| 1999 | Kimberlite Pipe | Robby Albarado | Dallas Stewart | J. D. Gunther | 1 1/16 M | 1:43.56 | $640,000 | II |
| 1998 | Comic Strip | Shane Sellers | Neil J. Howard | William S. Farish III | 1 1/16 M | 1:43.36 | $500,000 | III |
| 1997 | Crypto Star | Pat Day | Wayne Catalano | Darrell & Evelyn Yates | 1 1/16 M | 1:42.60 | $400,000 | III |
| 1996 | **Grindstone** | Jerry D. Bailey | D. Wayne Lukas | Overbrook Farm | 1 1/16 M | 1:42.79 | $370,000 | III |
| 1995 | Petionville | Chris Antley | Randy Bradshaw | Everest Stables | 1 1/16 M | 1:42.96 | $350,000 | III |
| 1994 | Kandaly | Craig Perret | Louie J. Roussel III | Louie J. Roussel III | 1 1/16 M | 1:42.86 | $325,000 | III |
| 1993 | Dixieland Heat | Randy Romero | Gerald Romero | Leland Cook | 1 1/16 M | 1:44.80 | $300,000 | III |
| 1992 | Line In The Sand | Pat Day | Neil J. Howard | William S. Farish III | 1 1/16 M | 1:43.40 | $200,000 | III |
| 1991 | Richman | Pat Day | William I. Mott | William F. Lucas | 1 1/16 M | 1:44.50 | $200,000 | III |
| 1990 | Heaven Again | Corey Nakatani | Vincent Timphony | K. Timphony et al. | 1 1/16 M | 1:43.80 | $165,000 | III |
| 1989 | Dispersal | José A. Santos | Bud Delp | Henry & Teresa Mayerhoff | 1 1/16 M | 1:43.80 | $165,000 | III |
| 1988 | **Risen Star** | Shane Romero | Louie J. Roussel III | R. Lamarque/L. J. Roussel III | 1 1/16 M | 1:42.80 | $165,000 | III |
| 1987 | J. T.'s Pet | Pat Day | Lynn S. Whiting | W. Cal Partee | 1 1/8 M | 1:51.00 | $120,000 | III |
| 1986 | Country Light | Pat Day | Steve C. Penrod | Cherry Valley Farm | 1 1/8 M | 1:50.40 | $186,650 | III |
| 1985 | Violado | Jacinto Vásquez | William E. Burch | Due Process Stable | 1 1/8 M | 1:50.20 | $185,000 | III |
| 1984 | Taylor's Special | Sam Maple | William I. Mott | William F. Lucas | 1 1/8 M | 1:49.60 | $185,000 | II |
| 1983 | Balboa Native | Jorge Velásquez | D. Wayne Lukas | Robert N. Spreen | 1 1/8 M | 1:50.60 | $185,000 | II |
| 1982 | El Baba | Don Brumfield | Dewey P. Smith | Dorothy D. Brown | 1 1/8 M | 1:50.60 | $185,000 | II |
| 1981 | Woodchopper | Jorge Velásquez | Robert J. Reinacher Jr. | Greentree Stable | 1 1/8 M | 1:50.80 | $210,000 | II |
| 1980 | Prince Valiant | Mike A. Gonzalez | John M. Gaver Jr. | Greentree Stable | 1 1/8 M | 1:50.40 | $160,000 | II |
| 1979 | Golden Act | Sandy Hawley | Loren Rettele | W. H. Oldknow & R. W. Phipps | 1 1/8 M | 1:51.20 | $170,000 | II |
| 1978 | Esops Foibles | Chris McCarron | Loren Rettele | Jerry Frankel | 1 1/8 M | 1:50.80 | $135,000 | II |
| 1977 | Clev Er Tell | Ray Broussard | Homer C. Pardue | J. R. Straus & I. Proler | 1 1/8 M | 1:48.80 | $100,000 | II |
| 1976 | Johnny Appleseed | Marco Castaneda | John M. Gaver Jr. | Greentree Stable | 1 1/8 M | 1:49.80 | $100,000 | II |
| 1975 | **Master Derby** | Darrel McHargue | Smiley Adams | Golden Chance Farm | 1 1/8 M | 1:49.60 | $100,000 | II |
| 1974 | Sellout | Marco Castaneda | James P. Conway | Jean Pancoast | 1 1/8 M | 1:51.20 | $93,000 | II |
| 1973 | Leo's Pisces | Robert Breen | Abe Simoff | Joseph Taub | 1 1/8 M | 1:51.60 | $85,000 | II |
| 1972 | No Le Hace | Phil Rubbicco | Homer C. Pardue | Joseph W. Strauss | 1 1/8 M | 1:52.80 | $85,000 | |
| 1971 | Northfields | Walter Blum | Woody Stephens | John M. Olin | 1/1 M | 1:50.80 | $50,000+ | |
| 1970 | Jim's Alibhi | Ronnie Baldwin | James J. Eckrosh | J. Eckrosh & Est. of F. Akin | 1 1/8 M | 1:55.60 | $50,000+ | |
| 1969 | King of the Castle | Carlos H. Marquez | Oliver Cutshaw | Ogden Phipps | 1 1/8 M | 1:52.80 | $47,500+ | |
| 1968 | Kentucky Sherry | Jimmy Combest | Alcee Richard | Dorothy D. Brown | 1 1/8 M | 1:50.20 | $45,000+ | |
| 1967 | Ask the Fare | Donald Holmes | Jere R. Smith Sr. | Holiday Stable | 1 1/8 M | 1:50.00 | $45,000+ | |
| 1966 | Blue Skyer | Ray Broussard | James A. Padgett | M. Padgett & H. Grant | 1 1/8 M | 1:50.60 | $45,000+ | |
| 1965 | Dapper Delegate | John Heckmann | Alcee Richard | Dorothy D. Brown | 1 1/8 M | 1:50.20 | $40,000+ | |
| 1964 | Grecian Princess | Kelly Broussard | Peter C. Keiser | Theodore D. Buhl | 1 1/8 M | 1:50.80 | $40,000+ | |
| 1963 | City Line | Robert L. Baird | John O. Meaux | T. Alie Grissom | 1 1/8 M | 1:50.20 | $40,000+ | |
| 1962 | Admiral's Voyage | Ray Broussard | Charles R. Parke | Fred W. Hooper | 1 1/8 M | 1:52.60 | $40,000+ | |
| 1961 | Bass Clef | Ronnie Baldwin | Anthony W. Rupelt | Mrs. V. E. Smith | 1 1/8 M | 1:50.20 | $40,000+ | |
| 1960 | Tony Graff | Wayne Chambers | Nicholas Graffagnini | Anthony Graffagnini | 1 1/8 M | 1:52.00 | $40,000+ | |
| 1959 | Master Palynch | Ray Broussard | Elmer Kalensky | S. Sair & B. Hatskin | 1 1/8 M | 1:49.80 | $40,000+ | |
| 1958 | Royal Union | John Heckmann | Frank Sanders | Reverie Knoll Farm | 1 1/8 M | 1:52.00 | $40,000+ | |
| 1957 | Federal Hill | Willie Carstens | Stanley M. Rieser | Clifford Lussky | 1 1/8 M | 1:49.60 | $40,000+ | |
| 1956 | Reaping Right | Robert L. Baird | Vester R. Wright | T. Alie Grissom | 1 1/8 M | 1:51.00 | $40,000+ | |
| 1955 | Roman Patrol | Douglas Dodson | Joseph H. Pierce Sr. | Pin Oak Farm | 1 1/8 M | 1:49.80 | $40,000+ | |
| 1954 | Gigantic | Rich McLaughlin | John B. Theall | Joe W. Brown | 1 1/8 M | 1:53.20 | $40,000+ | |
| 1953 | Matagorda | Paul J. Bailey | John B. Theall | Joe W. Brown | 1 1/8 M | 1:51.80 | $40,000+ | |
| 1952 | Gushing Oil | Al Popara | Joseph Jansen | Sam E. Wilson Jr. | 1 1/8 M | 1:51.20 | $20,000+ | |
| 1951 | Whirling Bat | Pete Anderson | Thomas G. May | Thomas G. May | 1 1/8 M | 1:53.80 | $20,000+ | |
| 1950 | Greek Ship | Con Errico | Preston M. Burch | Brookmeade Stable | 1 1/8 M | 1:51.00 | $15,000+ | |
| 1949 | Rookwood | John Delahoussaye | John B. Theall | Joe W. Brown | 1 1/8 M | 1:51.20 | $15,000+ | |
| 1948 | Bovard | Willie Saunders | James J. Rowan | Sylvester W. Labrot | 1 1/8 M | 1:51.60 | $15,000+ | |
| 1947 | Carolyn A. | Ronnie Nash | James P. Conway | Ben F. Whitaker | 1 1/8 M | 1:57.80 | $20,000+ | |
| 1946 | Pellicle | Andrew LoTurco | E. Leigh Cotton | Hal Price Headley | 1 1/8 M | 1:52.80 | $15,000+ | |
| 1945 | Race not held | | | | | | | |
| 1944 | Olympic Zenith | Nick Jemas | Edward L. Snyder | William G. Helis Sr. | 1 1/8 M | 1:54.00 | $15,000+ | |
| 1943 | Amber Light | Johnny Longden | Jack C. Hodgins | Charles T. Fisher | 1 1/8 M | 1:52.60 | $15,000+ | |
| 1940 | 1942 | Race not held | | | | | | |
| 1939 | Day Off | Eddie Arcaro | E. Leigh Cotton | Greentree Stable | 1 1/8 M | 1:52.60 | $12,000+ | |
| 1938 | Wise Fox | Johnny Longden | Alfred G. Tarn | Alfred G. Tarn | 1 1/8 M | 1:51.20 | $12,000+ | |
| 1937 | Grey Count | Charles Corbett | Anthony Pelleteri | Millsdale Stable | 1 1/8 M | 1:50.80 | $10,000+ | |
| 1936 | Rushaway | Johnny Longden | Alfred G. Tarn | Alfred G. Tarn | 1 1/8 M | 1:50.80 | $5,000+ | |
| 1935 | McCarthy | Paul Keester | Thomas E. Keating | Morrison & Keating | 1 1/8 M | 1:54.00 | $3,000+ | |
| 1934 | Hickory Lad | Jack Westrope | O. L. Foster | William C. Reichert | 1 1/8 M | 1:53.80 | $3,500+ | |
| 1933 | Col. Hatfield | Carl Meyer | John Parmalee | M. B. Cohen | 1 1/8 M | 1:56.80 | $5,000+ | |
| 1932 | Lucky Tom | Anthony Pascuma | Henry C. Riddle | J. J. Robinson | 1 1/8 M | 1:53.60 | $10,000+ | |
| 1931 | Spanish Play | Charles Landolt | George Land | Knebelkamp & Morris | 1 1/8 M | 1:51.20 | $7,500+ | |
| 1930 | Michigan Boy | Jimmy Shelton | J. Butler | John L. Pontius | 1 1/8 M | 2:00.20 | $10,000+ | |
| 1929 | Calf Roper | Frank Coltiletti | Charles E. Durnell | Three D's Stock Farm Stable | 1 1/8 M | 1:56.00 | $15,000+ | |
| 1928 | Jack Higgins | Charles E. Allen | William J. Curran | William J. Curran | 1 1/8 M | 1:52.00 | $15,000+ | |
| 1927 | Boo | G. Johnson | William A. Hurley | Idle Hour Stock Farm Stable | 1 1/8 M | 1:51.80 | $15,000+ | |
| 1926 | Bagenbaggage | Eric Blind | William A. Hurley | Idle Hour Stock Farm Stable | 1 1/8 M | 1:51.20 | $10,000+ | |
| 1925 | Quatrain | Harry Stutts | Thomas J. Harmon | Frederick Johnson | 1 1/8 M | 1:56.00 | $17,500+ | |
| 1924 | Black Gold | J. D. Mooney | Hanley Webb | Rosa M. Hoots | 1 1/8 M | 1:57.60 | $15,000+ | |
| 1923 | Amole | J. D. Mooney | Frank P. Letellier | Southland Stable | 1 1/8 M | 1:57.80 | $10,000+ | |
| 1921 | 1922 | Race not held | | | | | | |
| 1920 | Damask | Eddie Ambrose | Mose Goldblatt | Harry Payne Whitney | 1 1/8 M | 1:51.80 | $5,000+ | |
| 1909 | 1919 | Race not held | | | | | | |
| 1908 | Meelick | Eddie Dugan | Sam Hildreth | Sam Hildreth | 1 1/8 M | 1:51.80 | $7,825* | |
| 1907 | Montgomery | Carroll Shilling | Frank E. Brown | Emil Hertz | 1 1/8 M | 1:53.60 | $7,825* | |
| 1906 | Guiding Star | Jack Martin | Sam Hildreth | Sam Hildreth | 1 1/8 M | 1:54.40 | $7,140* | |
| 1905 | Right Royal | Jack Martin | Roger Minton | Morris L. Hayman | 1 1/8 M | 1:59.40 | $7,145* | |
| 1904 | Ostrich | Grover Fuller | | G. L. Richards | 1 1/8 M | 1:52.20 | $4,550* | |
| 1903 | Witfull | Willie Gannon | Sam Hildreth | Sam Hildreth | 1 1/8 M | 2:07.60 | $4,640* | |
| 1902 | Lord Quex | Jimmy Winkfield | Albert Simons | Albert Simons | 1 1/8 M | 2:00.25 | $3,450* | |
| 1901 | Henry Clay Rye | Harry Cochran | | Wallace C. Fessenden | 1 1/8 M | 1:55.00 | $2,840* | |
| 1900 | Prince of Veronia | Eddie McJoynt | Robert J. Walden | Alfred H Morris. & David H. Morris | 1 1/8 M | 2:00.00 | $2,840* | |
| 1899 | King Barleycorn | William Martin | Edward W. Heffner | Edward W. Heffner | 1 1/8 M | 1:54.25 | $2,840* | |
| 1898 | Presbyterian | Tommy Burns | George Walker | John W. Schorr | 1 1/8 M | 1:56.50 | $2,900* | |
| 1897 | Meadowthorpe | Tommy Murphy | | John W. Schorr | 1 1/8 M | | $2,000* | |
| 1895 | 1896 | Race not held | | | | | | |
| 1894 | Buckwa | Roy Williams | | T. H. Stevens | 1 M | 1:51.00 | $1,500* | |

- Winners in bold won a Triple Crown Race
- * Denotes amount of money awarded to winner.

== See also ==
- Louisiana Derby "top three finishers" and starters
- Road to the Kentucky Derby
