= Borderland Derby =

The Mine That Bird Derby (formerly the Borderland Derby) is an American Thoroughbred horse race held at Sunland Park Racetrack in Sunland Park, New Mexico. Named originally for the location of the track, which sits on the border of New Mexico and Texas, the race is a prep for the Sunland Derby (formerly the WinStar Derby), which is on the road to the Kentucky Derby. The Mine That Bird Derby is for three-year-olds and is run at the distance of 1-1/16 mi.

== Winners of the Mine That Bird / Borderland Derby ==
Year	Winner	Jockey	Trainer	Owner	Breeder	Distance	Time	Purse	Margin	Winner Paid
2015	Where's the Moon	Enrique Gomez	Henry Dominguez	J. Kirk and Judy Robison	Alexander Groves Matz, LLC	1-1/16 mi.	1:42.80	$100,000	2-1/2	28.80
2014	Proceed	Alfredo Juarez Jr.	Joel Marr	Michael C. Stinson	Michael C. Stinson	1-1/16 mi.	1:42.47	$120,000	2	4.60
2013	Dry Summer	Carlos Madeira	Joel Marr	Sam Britt & Michael House	Richard Shultz	1-1/16 mi.	1:45.32	$120,000	1-1/2	4.60
2012	Isn't He Clever	Alejandro Medellin	Henry Dominguez	J. Kirk and Judy Robison	Monticule	1-1/16 mi.	1:43.00	$150,000	1-3/4	5.00
2011	Fusa Code	Justin Shepherd	Steven Asmussen	Cathy and Bob Zollars	Northwest Farms LLC	1-1/16 mi.	1:45.06	$100,000	3/4	16.60
2010	Storming Saint	Luis Contreras	Henry Dominguez	Lathrop G. Hoffman	Harold J. Plumley	1-1/16 mi.	1:45.27	$100,000	Neck	5.60
2009	Scorewithcater	Michael Baze	Doug O'Neill	Robert Master	Hall's Family Trust	1-1/16 mi.	1:43.96	$100,000	Neck	6.60
2008	Poni Colada	Alfredo Juarez Jr.	Steven Asmussen	Bob Zollars & Mark Wagner	Hopewell Investments, LLC	1-1/16 mi.	1:47.19	$100,000	8	5.40
2007	Takedown	Glen Murphy	Steven Asmussen	Ackerley Brothers Farm	Glory Days Breeding, Inc.	1-1/16 mi.	1:44.64	$100,000	1-1/4	13.20
2006	Indy Wildcat	Michael Baze	Paula Capestro	Bearing Point Ventures & Paula Capestro	Kathleen Ann Schonefeld	1-1/16 mi.	1:44.82	$100,000	Head	20.00
2005	Southern Africa	Garrett Gomez	Michael Puhich	Al and Saundra S. Kirkwood	Hassan Ahamdi & Michael Anderson	1-1/16 mi.	1:43.18	$100,000	1-1/4	7.40
2004	Go Kitty Go	Miguel Fuentes	Mac Millar	Sylvia and Vernon R. Hauschild	Tommy Town Thoroughbreds, LLC	1 mi.	1:37.87	$100,000	1-1/14	50.40
2003	Mr. Decatur	Sal Gonazalez Jr.	Steven Asmussen	Heiligbrodt Racing Stable	Craig Bandoroff, John Clay & S. D. Brilie L.P	1 mi.	1:36.23	$100,000	Neck	7.80
2002	Premeditation	Michael Clark	William Leach	William L. Clifton, Jr.	Allen E. Paulson	1 mi.	1:36.16	$ 30,000	3-3/4	5.40
2001	Parting Guest	Duane Sterling	Steven Asmussen	Pin Oak Stable	Mike Hinkle & Summerhill Farm	1 mi.	1:38.60	$ 35,000	4-3/4	9.40
