= Pioneerof the Nile =

American-bred Thoroughbred racehorse

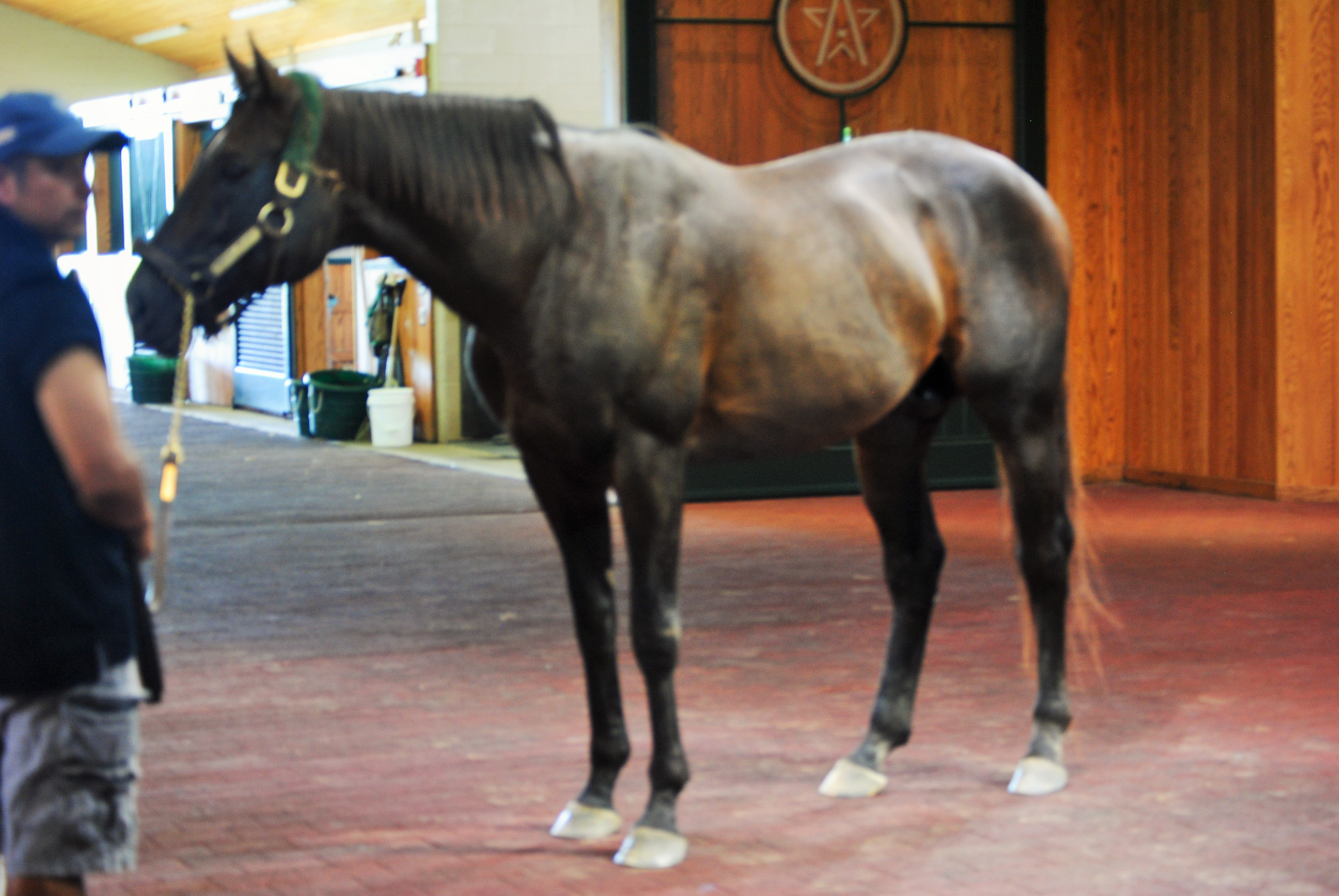
- Pioneerof the Nile at WinStar Farm
- Sire: Empire Maker
- Grandsire: Unbridled
- Dam: Star of Goshen
- Damsire: Lord at War
- Sex: Stallion
- Foaled: May 5, 2006
- Died: March 18, 2019 (aged 12); WinStar Farm; Versailles, Kentucky
- Country: United States
- Color: Dark Bay/Brown
- Breeder: Zayat Stables
- Owner: Zayat Stables
- Trainer: Bob Baffert
- Record: 10: 5–1–1
- Earnings: US$1,634,200

Major wins
- CashCall Futurity (2008); Robert B. Lewis Stakes (2009); San Felipe Stakes (2009); Santa Anita Derby (2009) American Classics placing: Kentucky Derby 2nd (2009)

Pioneerof the Nile (May 5, 2006 – March 18, 2019) was an American Thoroughbred racehorse who came second to Mine That Bird in the 2009 Kentucky Derby and sired the 2015 Triple Crown winner American Pharoah, as well as 2016 Champion 2-Year-Old Colt Classic Empire.

== Background ==
Pioneerof the Nile was a bay horse bred in Kentucky by its owner, Zayat Stables. He was sired by 2003 Belmont Stakes winner, Empire Maker. His dam, Star of Goshen, was a stakes-winning daughter of Lord at War, a multiple grade I winner whose victories included the 1985 Santa Anita Handicap. During his racing career, the colt was trained first by Bill Mott, and then by Bob Baffert.

Pioneerof the Nile's unusual name owes to the fact that The Jockey Club limits application submissions to 18 characters, including spaces; thus Zayat Stables dropped a space between "Pioneer" and "of".

At a 2007 yearling auction, the as-yet-unnamed Pioneerof the Nile was bought back by Zayat for $290,000 after failing to achieve bids commensurate with the owner's expectations. He matured to stand 16.2 hands (66 inches, 168 cm).

== Racing career ==
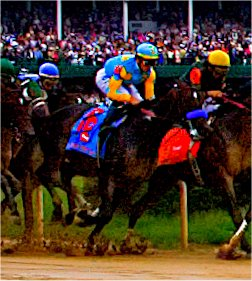
Pioneerof the Nile running in the 2009 Kentucky Derby

=== 2008: two-year-old-season ===
As a two-year-old, Pioneerof the Nile debuted August 4, 2008, in a Maiden Special Weight (1 1/16 of a mile on turf) at Saratoga, where he finished fourth, beaten two lengths and a half. His next race was on August 25, another 1 1/16 of a mile turf Maiden Special Weight at Saratoga. He jumped in the air at the break and stayed in seventh of the nine-horse field before moving up and challenging for the lead on the turn, gaining the lead off of the turn, and going on to win by a length with a time of 1:41.59.

His next start came in the Grade I Breeders' Futurity Stakes at Keeneland, where he stayed in last of the eleven runners before making a bold move on the far turn. He flattened out in the stretch to finish third, beaten 8 lengths by Square Eddie and Terrain. He then started as the eleventh choice (in a field of twelve) in the Breeders' Cup Juvenile, which was held at Santa Anita Park that year. He broke well, settled in mid-pack before being checked slightly on the first turn, and raced evenly in fifth on the backstretch. He made a mild bid on the turn, and while he made no impression on the leaders, he battled with the rest of the field to finish an even fifth, 2 3/4 lengths behind the winner, Midshipman.

Zayat Stables then switched Pioneerof the Nile to trainer Bob Baffert, with whom they had split with earlier in the year. "There's nothing like a good horse to help smooth over some of those hurt feelings," Baffert said. Ironically, Midshipman, with whom Baffert had won the Breeders' Cup Juvenile, was given to another trainer the same month as he was given Pioneerof the Nile. Pioneerof the Nile's first start for Baffert came in the CashCall Futurity, on December 20 at Hollywood Park. He started as the 1.40 favorite against a field 11 other two-year-olds. He broke evenly, and settled in fifth, about eight lengths off the lead. He moved up to third before the far turn and unleashed a rally and battled with I Want Revenge to win by a head in a final time of 1:41.95 for 1 1/16 miles. After the race, Baffert stated: “When he first got here I was trying to figure him out. Bill Mott sent him to me in great shape... When he takes the lead, he wants to pull himself up. He started doing that today, but as soon as the other horse came to him, he dug right back in again." His jockey, Garrett Gomez, said: "They told me in the paddock he's still a bit green and likes to wait on horses. When he saw that other horse (I Want Revenge) coming on the inside he really dug in."

=== 2009: three-year-old season ===
Pioneerof the Nile began his three-year-old season in the Robert B. Lewis Stakes, on February 7 at Santa Anita Park. He faced eight other three-year-olds, including previous rival and CashCall Futurity runner-up I Want Revenge. He broke well, and settled in sixth, about seven lengths behind a quick pace. He began to move up on the far turn, but entering the stretch, he still had about three lengths to make up. He determinedly ran down the leaders to win by a half length over Papa Clem, with a final time of 1:41.90. Baffert said: "With the trip he had, Gomez said he should have run third." His next start came in the San Felipe Stakes, against a mediocre field of six. He broke well, pulled his way up to pressure the front runner, New Bay, before moving alongside him on the turn, then took the lead in the stretch and opened up to win by 1 1/4 lengths, with a final time of 1:43.35. “He’s becoming very professional... I like what I saw today." Baffert said of the win.

On April 4, Pioneerof the Nile started in the Santa Anita Derby, in what was slated to be a showdown between him and Sham Stakes winner The Pamplemousse. But with The Pamplemousse's scratch due to injury the morning of the race, his main competition was El Camino Real Derby winner Chocolate Candy. Pioneerof the Nile broke well, was checked slightly behind a horse on the first turn, and was in fourth position on the backstretch. He then began to pull at the bridle, until he tugged himself to the lead, where he settled down and finally stopped tugging. Feisty Suances took the lead, with Pioneerof the Nile a length behind in second. When they entered the stretch, Pioneerof the Nile took the lead, and started to pull clear, but had to withstand a late charge from Chocolate Candy. Pioneerof the Nile crossed the wire a length in front, with a final time of 1:49.17. Gomez, who said afterwards that he could not hold Pioneerof the Nile back on the backstretch, said: "We won, but it wasn't really the way we wanted to do it."

On April 16, Pioneerof the Nile arrived at Churchill Downs for the Kentucky Derby. He breezed twice over the track before the Kentucky Derby, with Baffert saying that he was pleased with his works. The Kentucky Derby would be Pioneerof the Nile's first start on dirt, with all his prior races having been on turf or synthetic surfaces. Baffert didn't think it would bother the horse, stating: "He's got a long stride as it is, but he really moves better over the dirt." On May 2, Pioneerof the Nile started from post 16, as the third choice, against a field of eighteen other colts. The track was sealed, and listed as sloppy. He broke very well, was bumped slightly, moved up to co-third with Papa Clem, where he settled down the backstretch, outside and about three lengths behind the leaders. around the far turn, he began to make his move, and took a short lead mid-stretch. Mine That Bird, a 50-1 long shot, moved up the rail and quickly opened up a large lead. Pioneerof the Nile battled with the rest of the field and held second by a nose over Musket Man, but was 6 3/4 lengths behind Mine That Bird.

Pioneerof the Nile started next on May 16 in the Preakness Stakes, where he faced Mine That Bird again, along with the impressive Kentucky Oaks winner Rachel Alexandra. He was the second choice, behind heavy favorite Rachel Alexandra. He broke well, moved up to fourth, and stayed within striking distance of the leaders down the backstretch. He had to go wide on the turn, and began to fade, eventually being eased mid-stretch to finish eleventh in a thirteen-horse field.

== Stud career ==
Pioneerof the Nile was retired from racing after a soft tissue injury in July 2009. He first stood at the Vinery Stud in Lexington, Kentucky, in 2010 for a stud fee of $17,500. Zayat retained a 75% interest in the stallion, where he usually keeps a 25% share. His first crop of foals began racing in 2013. From his first crop he sired Derby prospects Cairo Prince, winner of the 2013 Nashua Stakes and the 2014 Holy Bull Stakes, Social Inclusion, an allowance winner who finished 3rd in the 2014 Wood Memorial and Preakness Stakes, and Vinceremos, winner of the 2014 Sam F. Davis Stakes and second-place finisher in the Tampa Bay Derby. Vinceremos was the only one of the three to make it to the Kentucky Derby, finishing 17th In his second season at stud he sired the 2014 American Champion Two-Year-Old Male Horse American Pharoah, who became an eight-time-grade I winner and the 12th U.S. Triple Crown winner in 2015. In 2016, his son Classic Empire won the Breeders' Futurity and Breeders' Cup Juvenile, earning the title of Champion Two-Year-Old Colt. Classic Empire went on to win the 2017 Arkansas Derby, before finishing a troubled fourth in the Kentucky Derby, and then suffering a head defeat in the Preakness Stakes.

Pioneerof the Nile stood at WinStar Farm. In 2015 his fee was increased to $60,000. Following the racing success of American Pharoah, in October 2015, it was announced that Pioneerof the Nile's stud fee had more than doubled, and he would stand the 2016 season for a fee of $125,000, though Justin Zayat, son of Ahmed Zayat, said offers as high as $150,000 had been entertained for 2016. For 2017, his stud fee was set at $110,000.

=== Notable progeny ===
c = colt, f = filly, g = gelding

Foaled	Name	Sex	Major Wins
2011	Midnight Storm	c	Shoemaker Mile Stakes
2012	American Pharoah	c	Del Mar Futurity, FrontRunner Stakes, Arkansas Derby, Kentucky Derby, Preakness Stakes, Belmont Stakes, Haskell Invitational Stakes, Breeders' Cup Classic
2014	Classic Empire	c	Breeders' Futurity Stakes, Breeders' Cup Juvenile, Arkansas Derby
2019	Matareya	f	Acorn Stakes, Derby City Distaff Stakes

=== Death ===
After breeding a mare on the morning of March 18, 2019, Pioneerof the Nile began acting uncomfortable once he was back in his stall. WinStar Farm immediately loaded him in a trailer to transport him to the vet clinic, but the stallion died en route. A necropsy was performed on his body, revealing that Pioneerof the Nile suffered a heart attack.

== Race record ==
Date	Track	Race	Distance	Finish
8/4/2008	Saratoga	Maiden Special Weight	1 1/16 miles (turf)	4th
8/25/2008	Saratoga	Maiden Special Weight	1 1/16 miles (turf)	1st
10/4/2008	Keeneland	Breeders' Futurity Stakes	1 1/16 miles	3rd
10/25/2008	Santa Anita Park	Breeders' Cup Juvenile	1 1/16 miles	5th
12/20/2008	Hollywood Park	CashCall Futurity	1 1/16 miles	1st
2/7/2009	Santa Anita Park	Robert B. Lewis Stakes	1 1/16 miles	1st
3/14/2009	Santa Anita Park	San Felipe Stakes	1 1/16 miles	1st
4/4/2009	Santa Anita Park	Santa Anita Derby	1 1/8 miles	1st
5/2/2009	Churchill Downs	Kentucky Derby	1 1/4 miles	2nd
5/16/2009	Pimlico	Preakness Stakes	1 3/16 miles	11th
