= Friesan Fire =

American-bred Thoroughbred racehorse

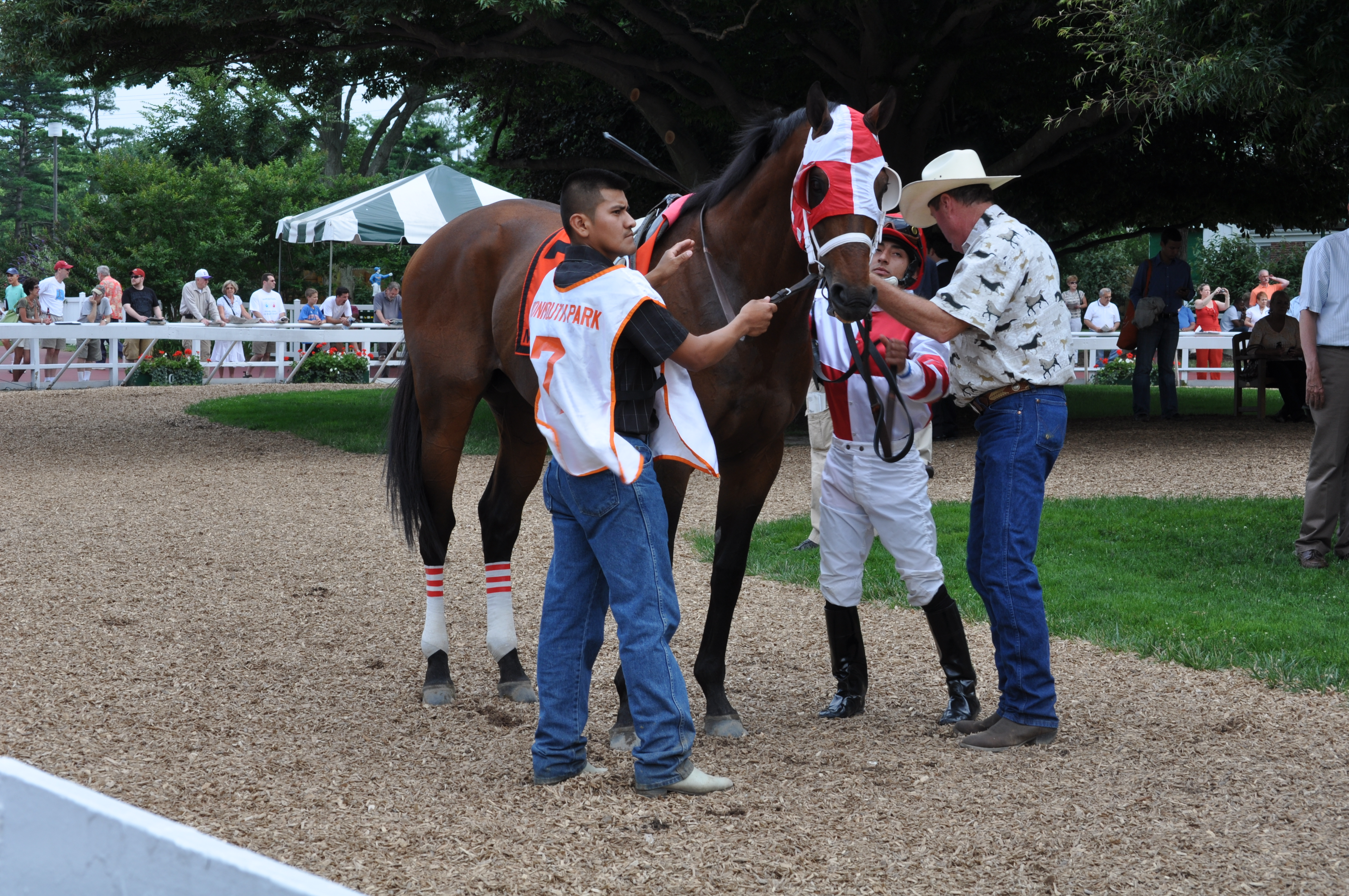
- Friesan Fire at 2011 Salvator Mile Stakes.
- Sire: A.P. Indy
- Grandsire: Seattle Slew
- Dam: Bollinger
- Damsire: Dehere
- Sex: Stallion
- Foaled: April 30, 2006
- Country: United States
- Colour: Bay
- Breeder: Grapestock LLC
- Owner: Vinery Stud Stakes & Fox Hill Farm
- Trainer: J. Larry Jones
- Record: 16: 5-1-3
- Earnings: US$ 676,506 (ongoing)

Major wins
- Lecomte Stakes (2009); Risen Star Stakes (2009); Louisiana Derby (2009); Louisiana Handicap (2010)

Friesan Fire (foaled April 30, 2006, in Kentucky) is an American Thoroughbred racehorse. He was sired by 1992 American Horse of the Year, A.P. Indy, a son of the 1977 U.S. Triple Crown winner, Seattle Slew. His dam, Bollinger, is an Australian Group One winner and a daughter of 1993 American Champion Two-Year-Old Colt, Dehere. Bred by Grapestock LLC, he was sold for $725,000 at the Keeneland yearling sale in September 2007.

Owned and raced by Vinery Stud Stakes & Fox Hill Farm, Friesan Fire is trained by J. Larry Jones, who trained Eight Belles, the 2008 Kentucky Derby second-place finisher. The colt's best result racing as a two-year-old was a third-place finish in the 2008 Belmont Futurity Stakes. However, after winning three important Graded stakes races including the Louisiana Derby, he became a leading contender for the Kentucky Derby, the first leg of the U.S. Triple Crown series, and was the favorite on Derby Day at 7:2 after I Want Revenge scratched. He finished 18th.

On January 23, 2010, Fresian Fire, racing in blinkers, he took the Louisiana Handicap wire to wire, beating General Quarters, a horse also on the 2009 Derby trail. He was fourth in the Texas Mile Stakes in 2011.

== Stud career ==
Friesan Fire's descendants include:

c = colt, f = filly

Foaled	Name	Sex	Major Wins
2013	Morning Fire	c	Pasco Stakes, Spectacular Bid Stakes
2014	Army Mule	c	Carter Handicap
2016	Call Paul	c	Swale Stakes, Saratoga Special Stakes
