= Belmont Stakes top three finishers =

List of the top three annual finishers in the Belmont Stakes

This is a listing of the horses that finished in either first, second, or third place and the number of starters in the Belmont Stakes, the third leg of the United States Triple Crown of Thoroughbred Racing run at 1 1/2 miles (12 furlongs; 2,414 m) on dirt for three-year-olds at Belmont Park in Elmont, New York.

Year	Winner	Second	Third	Starters
2026 BS	Golden Tempo	Commandment	Renegade	9
2025 BS	Sovereignty	Journalism	Baeza	8
2024 BS	Dornoch	Mindframe	Sierra Leone	10
2023 BS	Arcangelo	Forte	Tapit Trice	9
2022 BS	Mo Donegal	Nest	Skippylongstocking	8
2021 BS	Essential Quality	Hot Rod Charlie	Rombauer	8
2020 BS	Tiz the Law	Dr, Post	Max Player	10
2019 BS	Sir Winston	Tacitus	Joevia	10
2018 BS	Justify†	Gronkowski	Hofburg	10
2017 BS	Tapwrit	Irish War Cry	Patch	11
2016 BS	Creator	Destin	Lani	13
2015 BS	American Pharoah†	Frosted	Keen Ice	8
2014 BS	Tonalist	Commissioner	Medal Count	11
2013 BS	Palace Malice	Oxbow	Orb	14
2012 BS	Union Rags	Paynter	Atigun	11
2011 BS	Ruler on Ice	Stay Thirsty	Brilliant Speed	12
2010 BS	Drosselmeyer	Fly Down	First Dude	12
2009 BS	Summer Bird	Dunkirk	Mine That Bird	10
2008 BS	Da'Tara	Denis of Cork	Anak Nakal	9
2007 BS	Rags To Riches ‡	Curlin	Tiago	7
2006 BS	Jazil	Bluegrass Cat	Sunriver	12
2005 BS	Afleet Alex	Andromeda's Hero	Nolan's Cat	11
2004 BS	Birdstone	Smarty Jones	Royal Assault	9
2003 BS	Empire Maker	Ten Most Wanted	Funny Cide	6
2002 BS	Sarava	Medaglia d'Oro	Sunday Break	11
2001 BS	Point Given	A P Valentine	Monarchos	9
2000 BS	Commendable	Aptitude	Unshaded	11
1999 BS	Lemon Drop Kid	Vision and Verse	Charismatic	12
1998 BS	Victory Gallop	Real Quiet	Thomas Jo	11
1997 BS	Touch Gold	Silver Charm	Free House	7
1996	Editor's Note	Skip Away	My Flag ‡	14
1995	Thunder Gulch	Star Standard	Citadeed	11
1994	Tabasco Cat	Go for Gin	Strodes Creek	6
1993	Colonial Affair	Kissin Kris	Wild Gale	13
1992	A. P. Indy	My Memoirs	Pine Bluff	11
1991 BS	Hansel	Strike the Gold	Mane Minister	11
1990	Go And Go	Thirty Six Red	Baron de Vaux	9
1989	Easy Goer	Sunday Silence	Le Voyageur	10
1988	Risen Star	Kingpost	Brian's Time	6
1987	Bet Twice	Cryptoclearance	Gulch	9
1986	Danzig Connection	Johns Treasure	Ferdinand	10
1985	Creme Fraiche	Stephan's Odyssey	Chief's Crown	11
1984	Swale	Pine Circle	Morning Bob	11
1983	Caveat	Slew o' Gold	Barberstown	15
1982	Conquistador Cielo	Gato Del Sol	Illuminate	11
1981	Summing	Highland Blade	Pleasant Colony	11
1980	Temperence Hill	Genuine Risk ‡	Rockhill Native	10
1979	Coastal	Golden Act	Spectacular Bid	8
1978 BS	Affirmed †	Alydar	Darby Creek Road	5
1977 BS	Seattle Slew †	Run Dusty Run	Sanhedrin	8
1976	Bold Forbes	McKenzie Bridge	Great Contractor	10
1975	Avatar	Foolish Pleasure	Master Derby	9
1974	Little Current	Jolly Johu	Cannonade	9
1973 BS	Secretariat †	Twice a Prince	My Gallant	5
1972	Riva Ridge	Ruritania	Cloudy Dawn	10
1971	Pass Catcher	Jim French	Bold Reason	13
1970	High Echelon	Needles n Pines	Naskra	10
1969	Arts and Letters	Majestic Prince	Dike	6
1968	Stage Door Johnny	Forward Pass	Call Me Prince	9
1967	Damascus	Cool Reception	Gentleman James	9
1966	Amberoid	Buffle	Advocator	11
1965	Hail To All	Tom Rolfe	First Family	8
1964	Quadrangle	Roman Brother	Northern Dancer	8
1963	Chateaugay	Candy Spots	Choker	7
1962	Jaipur	Admiral's Voyage	Crimson Satan	8
1961	Sherluck	Globemaster	Guadalcanal	9
1960	Celtic Ash	Venetian Way	Disperse	7
1959	Sword Dancer	Bagdad	Royal Orbit	9
1958	Cavan	Tim Tam	Flamingo	8
1957	Gallant Man	Inside Tract	Bold Ruler	6
1956	Needles	Career Boy	Fabius	8
1955	Nashua	Blazing Count	Portersville	8
1954	High Gun	Fisherman	Limelight	13
1953	Native Dancer	Jamie K.	Royal Bay Gem	6
1952	One Count	Blue Man	Armageddon	6
1951	Counterpoint	Battlefield	Battle Morn	9
1950	Middleground	Lights Up	Mr. Trouble	9
1949 BS	Capot	Ponder	Palestinian	9
1948 BS	Citation †	Better Self	Escadru	8
1947	Phalanx	Tide Rips	Tailspin	9
1946 BS	Assault †	Natchez	Cable	7
1945	Pavot	Wildlife	Jeep	8
1944	Bounding Home	Pensive	Bull Dandy	7
1943 BS	Count Fleet †	Fairy Manhurst	Deseronto	3
1942	Shut Out	Alsab	Lochinvar	7
1941 BS	Whirlaway †	Robert Morris	Yankee Chance	4
1940	Bimelech	Your Chance	Andy K.	6
1939	Johnstown	Belay	Gilded Knight	6
1938	Pasteurized	Dauber	Cravat	6
1937 BS	War Admiral †	Sceneshifter	Vamoose	8
1936	Granville	Mr. Bones	Hollyrood	10
1935 BS	Omaha †	Firethorn	Rosemont	5
1934	Peace Chance	High Quest	Good Goods	8
1933	Hurryoff	Nimbus	Union	9
1932	Faireno	Osculator	Flag Pole	11
1931	Twenty Grand	Sun Meadow	Jamestown	3
1930 BS	Gallant Fox †	Whichone	Questionnaire	4
1929	Blue Larkspur	African	Jack High	8
1928	Vito	Genie	Diavolo	6
1927	Chance Shot	Bois de Rose	Flambino ‡	6
1926	Crusader	Espino	Haste	9
1925	American Flag	Dangerous	Swope	7
1924	Mad Play	Mr. Mutt	Modest	11
1923	Zev	Chickvale	Rialto	8
1922	Pillory	Snob II	Hea	4
1921	Grey Lag	Sporting Blood	Leonardo II	4
1920 BS	Man o' War	Donnacona	none	2
1919 BS	Sir Barton †	Sweep On	Natural Bridge	3
1918	Johren	War Cloud	Cum Sah	4
1917	Hourless	Skeptic	Wonderful	3
1916	Friar Rock	Spur	Churchill	4
1915	The Finn	Half Rock	Pebbles	6
1914	Luke McLuke	Gainer	Charlestonian	3
1913	Prince Eugene	Rock View	Flying Fairy ‡	4
1912	no race	no race	no race	0
1911	no race	no race	no race	0
1910 BS	Sweep	Duke of Ormonde	none	2
1909	Joe Madden	Wise Mason	Donald MacDonald	5
1908	Colin	Fair Play	King James	4
1907	Peter Pan	Superman	Frank Gill	5
1906	Burgomaster	The Quail	Accountant	6
1905	Tanya ‡	Blandy	Hot Shot	7
1904	Delhi	Graziallo	Rapid Water	8
1903	Africander	Whorler	Red Knight	4
1902	Masterman	Ranald	King Hanover	6
1901	Commando	The Parader	All Green	3
1900	Ildrim	Petruchio	Missionary	7
1899 BS	Jean Bereaud	Half Time	Glengar	4
1898	Bowling Brook	Previous	Hamburg	4
1897	Scottish Chieftain	On Deck	Octagon	6
1896	Hastings	Handspring	Hamilton II	4
1895	Belmar	Counter Tenor	Nanki Pooh	5
1894	Henry of Navarre	Prig	Assignee	3
1893	Commanche	Dr Rice	Rainbow	5
1892	Patron	Shellbark	none	2
1891	Foxford	Montana	Laurestan	6
1890	Burlington	Devotee	Padishah	9
1889	Eric	Diablo	Zephyrus	3
1888 BS	Sir Dixon	Prince Royal	none	2
1887	Hanover	Oneko	none	2
1886	Inspector B	The Bard	Linden	5
1885 BS	Tyrant	St. Augustine	Tecumseh	6
1884	Panique	Knight of Ellerslie	Himalaya	4
1883	George Kinney	Trombone	Renegade	4
1882 BS	Forester	Babcock	Wyoming	3
1881	Saunterer	Eole	Baltic	6
1880	Grenada	Ferncliffe	Turenne	4
1879	Spendthrift	Monitor	Jericho	6
1878	Duke of Magenta	Bramble	Sparta	6
1877	Cloverbrook	Loiterer	Baden-Baden	13
1876	Algerine	Fiddlesticks	Barricade	5
1875	Calvin	Aristides	Millner	14
1874	Saxon	Grinstead	Aaron Pennington	9
1873	Springbok	Count d'Orsay	Strachino	10
1872	Joe Daniels	Meteor	Shylock	9
1871	Harry Bassett	Stockwood	By The Sea	11
1870	Kingfisher	Foster	Midday ‡	7
1869	Fenian	Glenelg	Invercauld ‡	8
1868	General Duke	Northumberland	Fanny Ludlow ‡	6
1867 BS	Ruthless ‡	DeCourcy	Rivoli	4

A † designates a Triple Crown Winner.
A ‡ designates a Filly.
Note: D. Wayne Lukas swept the 1995 Triple Crown with two different horses.
