= 1867 Belmont Stakes =

American horse race

1st Belmont Stakes
- Belmont Stakes
- Location: Jerome Park Racetrack
- Date: June 19, 1867
- Distance: 1 5/8 mi (13 furlongs; 2615 m)
- Winning horse: Ruthless
- Winning time: 3:05.00
- Jockey: Gilbert W. Patrick
- Trainer: A. Jack Minor
- Owner: Francis Morris
- Conditions: Heavy
- Surface: Dirt

The 1867 Belmont Stakes was the first running of the Belmont Stakes. It was held on June 19, 1867, at Jerome Park Racetrack in Fordham, Westchester County—now part of The Bronx.

In a field of four horses, the only filly that entered, Ruthless, won the inaugural event by a head over second place DeCourcey. Instead of having to carry 110 pounds like the other three horses, Ruthless only had to carry 107. For winning, Ruthless's owners received $1,850.

Ruthless was the first of only three fillies to win the Belmont Stakes. The other two are Tanya (1905) and Rags to Riches (2007).

== Results ==
Finish	Horse	Jockey	Trainer	Owner	Win $
1	Ruthless	Gilbert W. Patrick	A. Jack Minor	Francis Morris	$1,850
2	De Courcey	Casey		Casey	
3	Rivoli	Forbes		Swim	
4	Monday	T. Stewart		Francis Morris	
