= Belmont Stakes =

American stakes race for Thoroughbreds, part of the Triple Crown

- Previous: 2026 Belmont Stakes; June 6, 2026; Next: 2027 Belmont Stakes; June 5, 2027
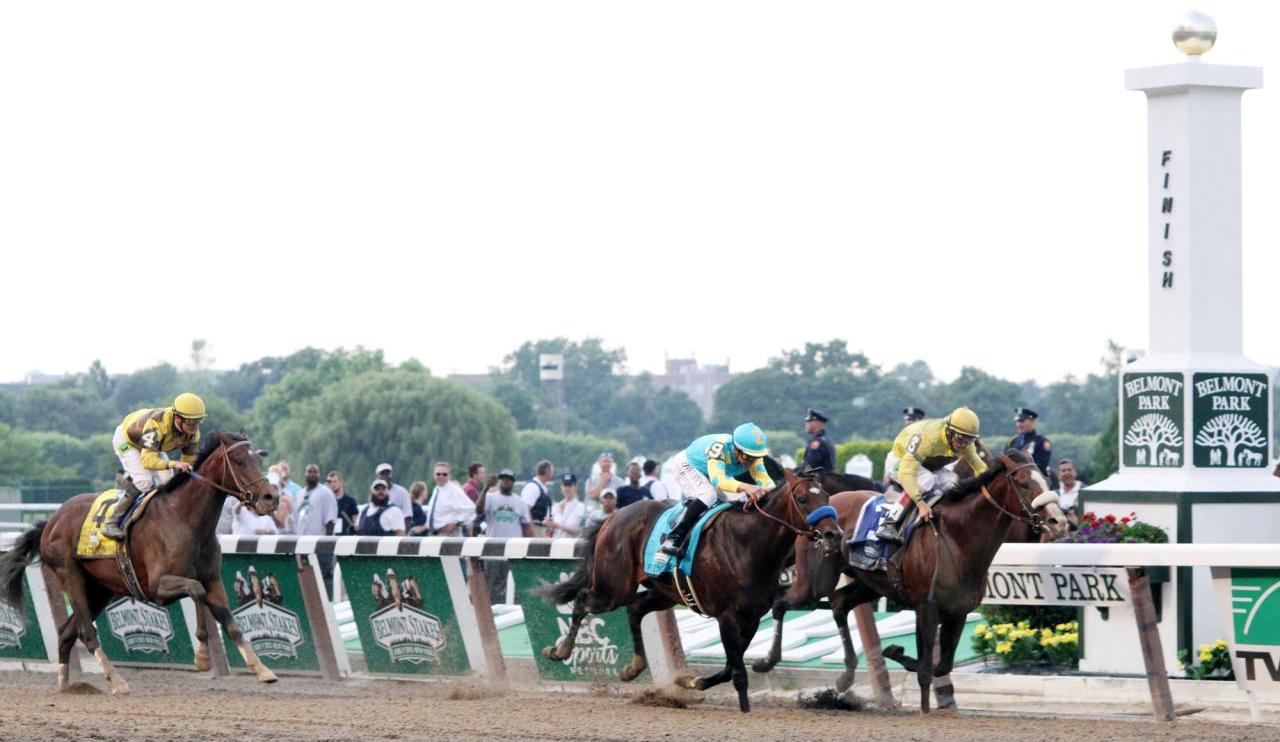
- "The Test of the Champion" "The Test of Champions" "The Run for the Carnations" "The Third Jewel of the Triple Crown"
- Class: Grade I
- Location: Belmont Park; Elmont, New York, U.S.
- Inaugurated: June 19, 1867 (159 years ago)
- Race type: Thoroughbred
- Website: www.nyra.com/belmont-stakes

Race information
- Distance: 1 1/2 mi (12 furlongs; 2.4 km)
- Record: 2:24, Secretariat (1973) more
- Surface: Dirt
- Track: Left-handed
- Qualification: 3-year-old
- Weight: Colt/Gelding: 126 pounds (57 kg); Filly: 121 pounds (55 kg)
- Purse: US$ 2 million (2024)

The Belmont Stakes is an American Grade I stakes race for three-year-old Thoroughbreds run at Belmont Park in Elmont, New York. It is run over the worldwide classic distance of 1 1/2 miles (12 furlongs; 2,414 metres). Colts and geldings carry a weight of 126 pounds (57 kg); fillies carry 121 pounds (55 kg). The race, nicknamed "The Test of the Champion", "The Test of Champions" and "The Run for the Carnations", is the traditional third and final leg of the Triple Crown and will be the second race in the Thoroughbred Championship Series. It is usually held on the first or second Saturday in June, five weeks after the Kentucky Derby and three weeks after the Preakness Stakes. The 1973 Belmont Stakes and Triple Crown winner Secretariat holds the track record (which is also a world record on dirt) of 2:24.

The race covers one full lap of Belmont Park, known as "The Championship Track" because nearly every major American champion in racing history has competed on the racetrack. Belmont Park, with its large, wide, sweeping turns and long homestretch, is considered one of the fairest racetracks in America. Despite the distance, the race tends to favor horses with tactical speed: relatively few winners close from far behind the early leaders.

The attendance at the Belmont Stakes is among the American thoroughbred racing top-attended events. The 2004 Belmont Stakes drew a television audience of 21.9 million viewers, and had the highest household viewing rate since 1977 when Seattle Slew won the Triple Crown.

The 158th Belmont Stakes was run on Saturday, June 6, 2026, at Saratoga Race Course and was won by Golden Tempo.

== History ==
=== 1867–1929: Early years ===
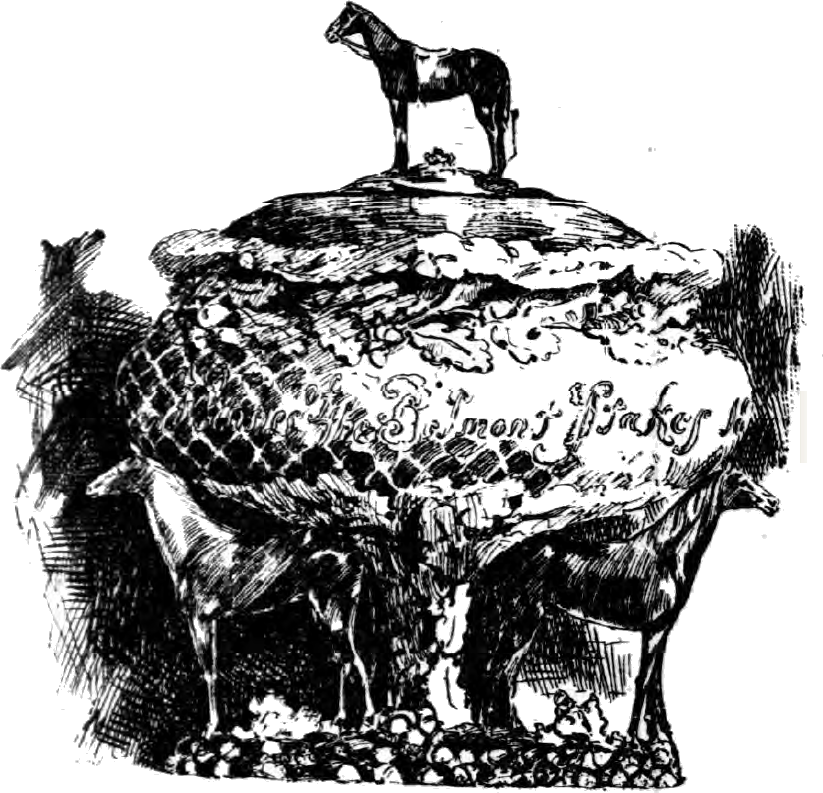
August Belmont Trophy, presented annually to the winning owner since 1926.

The first Belmont Stakes was held at Jerome Park Racetrack in the Bronx, built in 1866 by stock market speculator Leonard Jerome (1817–1891) and financed by August Belmont Sr. (1816–1890), for whom the race was named. The first race in 1867 saw the filly Ruthless win, while the following year was won by General Duke. The first post parade in the United States was at the 14th Belmont, in 1880. The race continued to be held at Jerome Park until 1890, when it was moved to the nearby facility, Morris Park Racecourse. The 1895 race was almost not held because of new laws that banned bookmaking in New York: it was eventually rescheduled for November 2. The race remained at Morris Park Racecourse until the May 1905 opening of the new Belmont Park, 430-acre (1.7 km^{2}) racetrack in Elmont, New York, on Long Island, just outside the New York City borough of Queens. When anti-gambling legislation was passed in New York State, Belmont Racetrack was closed, and the race was cancelled in 1911 and 1912.

The first winner of the Triple Crown was Sir Barton, in 1919, before the series was recognized as such. In 1920, the Belmont was won by the great Man o' War, who won by 20 lengths, setting a new stakes and American record, while under a stout pull.

Starting in 1926, the winner of the Belmont Stakes has been presented with August Belmont Trophy. The owner may keep the trophy for one year, and also receives a silver miniature for permanent use.

=== 1930–2000: Evolution of the Triple Crown series ===
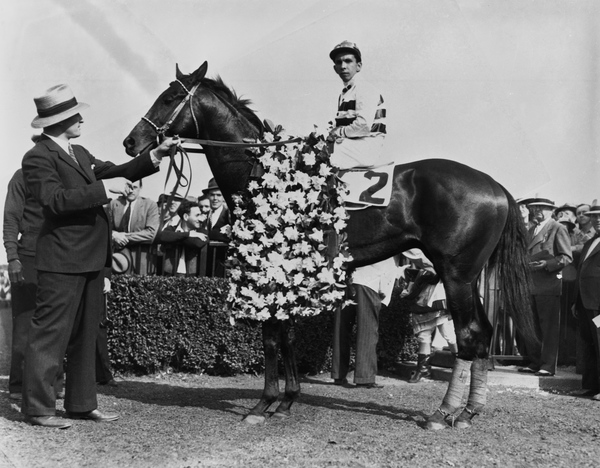
1940 winner Bimelech in the winner's circle

The term Triple Crown was first used when Gallant Fox won the three races in 1930, but the term did not enter widespread use until 1935 when his son Omaha repeated the feat. Sir Barton was then honored retroactively. Since 1931, the order of Triple Crown races has been the Kentucky Derby first, followed by the Preakness Stakes, and then the Belmont Stakes. Prior to 1931, the Preakness was run before the Derby eleven times. On May 12, 1917, and again on May 13, 1922, the Preakness and the Derby were run on the same day. On eleven occasions, the Belmont Stakes was run before the Preakness Stakes. The date of each event is now set by the Kentucky Derby, which is always held on the first Saturday in May. The Preakness Stakes is currently held two weeks later; and the Belmont Stakes is held three weeks after the Preakness (five weeks after the Derby). The earliest possible date for the Derby is May 1, and the latest is May 7; the earliest possible date for the Belmont is thus June 5, and the latest is June 11. In 2020, due to the cancellation of the original dates due to the COVID-19 pandemic, the order changed with the Belmont first on June 20, the Kentucky Derby on September 5 and the Preakness on October 3—all with no spectators—before the Triple Crown races resumed their normal schedule in 2021.

In 1937, War Admiral became the fourth Triple Crown winner after winning the Belmont in a new track record time of 2:28 3/5. In the 1940s, four Triple Crown winners followed: Whirlaway in 1941, Count Fleet in 1943, Assault in 1946 and Citation in 1948. Count Fleet won the race by a then-record margin of twenty-five lengths. He also set a stakes record of 2:28 1/5, a record tied by Citation. In 1957, the stakes record was smashed when Gallant Man ran the Belmont in 2:26 3/5 in a year when the Triple Crown series was split three ways.

The Belmont Stakes race was held at Aqueduct Racetrack from 1963 to 1967, while the track at Belmont was restored and renovated.

The largest crowd of the 20th century was in 1971 with over 80,000 people, supplemented by the city's Latino community, there to cheer on their new hero, Cañonero II, the Venezuelan colt who had won the Kentucky Derby and Preakness Stakes and was poised to win the U.S. Triple Crown. However, due to a foot infection that had bothered the horse for several days, Cañonero II failed to win the Triple Crown when he struggled across the finish line in 4th place behind Pass Catcher, ridden by Walter Blum. Despite this loss, Cañonero II was named the winner of the first Eclipse Award for Outstanding Three-Year-Old Male Horse.

On June 9, 1973, Secretariat won the Belmont Stakes by thirty-one lengths in a record time of 2:24, becoming a Triple Crown champion, ending a 25-year gap between Citation, the Belmont and Triple Crown winner in 1948. Secretariat's record still stands as the fastest running of the Belmont Stakes and an American record for 1 1/2 miles on the dirt. In 1977, Seattle Slew became the first horse to win the Triple Crown while undefeated. Affirmed was the last winner of the Triple Crown in the 20th century, taking the Belmont Stakes in 2:26 4/5 on June 10, 1978. Ridden by eighteen-year-old Steve Cauthen, Affirmed defeated rival Alydar with Jorge Velásquez in the saddle. At the time the race was the third-slowest start and the third-fastest finish with the quarter in 25, the half in 50, 3/4 in 1:14, the mile in 1:37 2/5.

In 1988, Secretariat's son Risen Star won the Belmont in 2:26 2/5, then the second-fastest time in the history of the race. The next year, Easy Goer lowered the mark for second-fastest time to 2:26. Easy Goer also holds a Beyer Speed Figure of 122 for the race, the best of any Triple Crown race since these ratings were first published in 1987.

=== 2001–present: Recent years ===
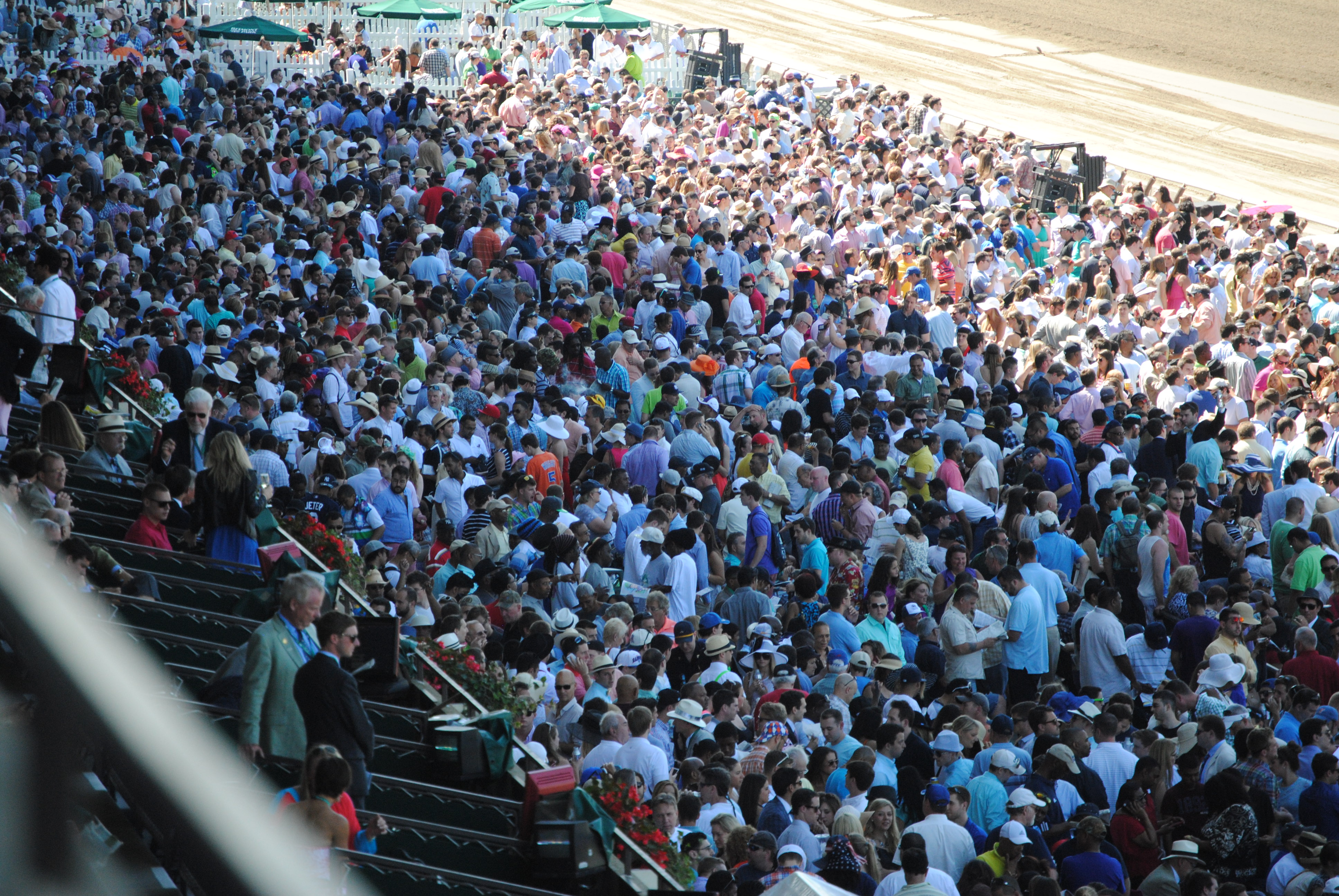
The crowd packs the facility when a Triple Crown is on the line

For three years in a row, horses came to the Belmont Stakes with a Triple Crown on the line only to fail. In 2002, Belmont Park hosted what was then the largest crowd in its history when 103,222 saw War Emblem lose to longshot Sarava after stumbling at the start. In 2003, 101,864 watched Funny Cide finish third behind Empire Maker. In 2004, the attendance record was shattered when 120,139 people saw Smarty Jones upset by Birdstone.

In 2007, Rags to Riches became the first filly to win the race since Tanya in 1905. Three more failed Triple Crown bids followed: in 2008, Big Brown lost to Da' Tara; in 2012, I'll Have Another was withdrawn due to injury; and in 2014, California Chrome was beaten by Tonalist. This fueled debate about whether the series needed to be changed, for example by lengthening the period between races.

American Pharoah won the 2015 race, becoming the 12th horse in history to win the Triple Crown and the first in 37 years. The crowd that year was limited for the first time, to 90,000. His time of 2:26.65 was the sixth-fastest in Belmont Stakes history, and the second-fastest time for a Triple Crown winner. In 2018, Justify became the 13th Triple Crown winner and only the second horse to do so while undefeated.

Justify won the 150th Belmont Stakes in 2018 to become the 13th Triple Crown champion.

The 152nd running of the Belmont Stakes took place without in-person fans on June 20, 2020, delayed from June 6 as a result of the COVID-19 pandemic. Leading to the announcement, NYRA considered various dates after evaluating the spring-summer meeting at Belmont Park and after the other three majors set their respective dates: the Kentucky Derby moving to September 5, the Preakness Stakes moving to October 3, and the Breeders' Cup Classic slated for November 7. Governor Andrew Cuomo of New York announced on May 16 that horse racing tracks statewide, including Belmont Park, would be permitted to resume races without in-person fans on June 1. The 2020 contest also marked the first time in history that the Belmont Stakes served as the Triple Crown's opening leg, with its running length shortened accordingly to 1 1/8 miles (9 furlongs), its shortest distance since 1894.

==== Temporary move to Saratoga ====
The New York Racing Association held both the 2024 Belmont Stakes and the 2025 Belmont Stakes at Saratoga Race Course because of ongoing construction and renovations at Belmont Park. The purse of the race was increased to US$2 million, with the winner receiving $1,200,000. It was run at a shorter distance of 1 1/4 miles (2.0 km) instead of the usual 1 1/2 miles (2.4 km) due to the smaller size of the Saratoga dirt track.

On June 13, 2025, it was announced that the 2026 Belmont Stakes would also be held at Saratoga Race Course.

The 2026 Belmont Stakes was the final running held at Saratoga Race Course before the race will return to its rebuilt home at Belmont Park in 2027.

==== Introduction of Thoroughbred Championship Series ====
On August 5, 2026, the NYRA and Churchill Downs Incorporated announced the Thoroughbred Championship Series (TCS), a six-race series for three-year-old thoroughbreds that is set to begin in 2027. The Belmont Stakes was designated as the second race of the new series, skipping over the Preakness Stakes in the process. The TCS has called the future of the Triple Crown into jeopardy as result.

== Locations ==
Over the years the race has been held at five racetracks in the state of New York:

- 1867–1889: Jerome Park Racetrack (23 times)
- 1890–1904: Morris Park Racecourse (15 times)
- 1905–1910: 1st Belmont Park (6 times)
- 1911–1912: Not held due to Hart-Agnew Law
- 1913–1962: 1st Belmont Park (56 times)
- 1963–1967: Aqueduct Racetrack (5 times)
- 1968–2023: 2nd Belmont Park (56 times)
- 2024–2026: Saratoga Race Course (3 times)

== Distance and race details ==
Race Length	Years
A mile and a furlong (1.125 miles)	1893–1894, 2020
A mile and a quarter	1890–1892, 1895, 1904–1905, 2024–2026
A mile and three furlongs (1.375 miles)	1896–1903, 1906–1925
A mile and a half	1874–1889, 1926–2019, 2021–2023
A mile and five furlongs (1.625 miles)	1867–1873

The purse for the first running in 1867 was $1,500 added, meaning the purse was supplemented by nomination and entry fees. This made the total purse $2,500, with the winner receiving $1,850. The purse increased sharply in the Roaring Twenties, from Man O'War's earnings of $7,950 in 1920 to Gallant Fox's take of $66,040 in 1930. Purses declined as a result of the Great Depression, with War Admiral earning only $28,020 in 1937, then began to recover. Throughout the sixties and early seventies, the value to the winner was roughly $100,000, depending on the added money generated by entry fees (larger fields thus leading to higher prize money). The purse was repeatedly raised in the eighties and nineties, reaching $500,000 added, with the winner receiving roughly $400,000. In 1998, the purse was changed to $1,000,000 guaranteed, with the winner receiving $600,000. In 2014, the purse was raised to $1,500,000.

With one exception, the race has been run at a level weight of 126 pounds (with a 5-pound allowance for fillies) since 1900. The 126 pounds comes from the English Classics, where the standard weight is 9 stone, with one stone equaling 14 pounds. In 1913, the Belmont was run as a handicap with the winner carrying only 109 pounds compared to the runner-up carrying 126 pounds. Races run prior to 1900 had varied weight conditions.

The first post parade in the United States was at the 14th Belmont, in 1880. Before 1921, the race was run in the clockwise tradition of English racing. Since then, the race has been run in the American, or counter-clockwise, direction.

== Traditions ==
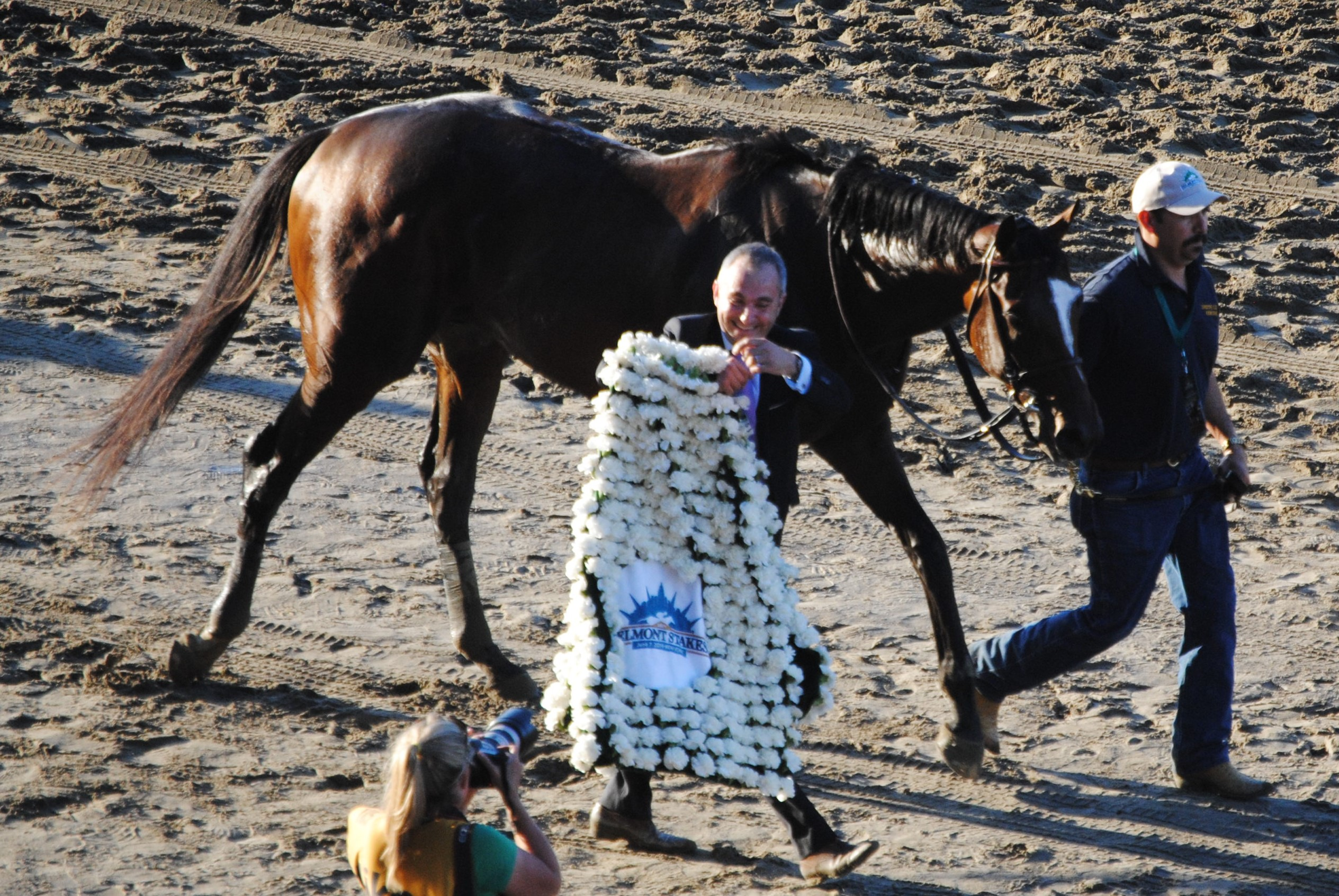
The winner's blanket, made of white carnations

The Belmont Stakes is traditionally called "The Test of the Champion" because it is by far the longest of the Triple Crown races (1.5 miles–a full lap around the enormous Belmont main track). It is also one of the longest first-class races on dirt in the United States. Most three-year-olds are unaccustomed to the distance, and lack the experience, if not the stamina, to maintain a winning speed for so long. In a long race such as the Belmont, positioning of the horse and the timing of the move to chase for the lead can be critical.

Unlike the Kentucky Derby or Preakness Stakes, a notable recording artist does not sing the national anthem during the pre-race ceremony.

It is also known as "The Run for the Carnations" because the winning horse is draped with a blanket of white carnations after the race, in similar fashion to the blanket of roses and black-eyed Susans for the Derby and Preakness, respectively.

=== Trophy ===
The winning owner is ceremonially presented with the silver winner's trophy, designed by Paulding Farnham for Tiffany and Co. It was first presented to August Belmont Jr. in 1896 and donated by the Belmont family for annual presentation in 1926.

=== Official song ===
Despite the fact that the Belmont Stakes is the oldest of the Triple Crown races, its traditions have been more subject to change. Until 1996, the post parade song was "The Sidewalks of New York". From 1997 to 2009, the song was changed to a recording by Frank Sinatra of the "Theme from New York, New York" in an attempt to appeal to younger fans. In 2010, the song was changed to Jay-Z's "Empire State of Mind" sung by Jasmine V before reverting to "Theme from New York, New York" from 2011 through the present. This tradition is similar to the singing of the state song at the post parades of the first two Triple Crown races: "My Old Kentucky Home" at the Kentucky Derby and "Maryland, My Maryland" at the Preakness Stakes. The change of song gave rise to "the myth of Mamie O'Rourke", a reference to a character in the lyrics of "The Sidewalks of New York." Before American Pharoah won the Triple Crown in 2015, some claimed that changing the official Belmont song "cursed" the Triple Crown and was why no horse had won since Affirmed in 1978. Others note that there was no Triple Crown winner between 1979 and 1996, even though "Sidewalks" was still played.

=== Official drink ===
Belmont Breeze Single Serving Ingredients:

- 1 1/2 oz. bourbon whiskey
- 2 oz. lemonade
- 1 oz. pomegranate juice
- Lemon wedge, orange zest, or cherry (for garnish)

Along with the change of song in 1997, the official drink was also changed, from the "White Carnation" to the "Belmont Breeze." The New York Times reviewed both cocktails unfavorably, calling the Belmont Breeze "a significant improvement over the nigh undrinkable White Carnation" despite the fact that it "tastes like a refined trashcan punch".

In 2011, the Belmont Breeze was again changed to the current official drink known as the "Belmont Jewel."

While the origin of the white carnation as the official flower of the Belmont Stakes is unknown, traditionally, pure white carnations stand for love and luck. It takes approximately 700 "select" carnations imported from Colombia to create the 40-pound blanket draped over the winner of the Belmont Stakes. The NYRA has long used The Pennock Company, a wholesale florist based in Philadelphia to import the carnations used for the mantle.

== Records ==
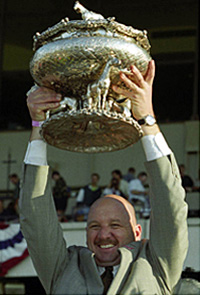
Kenny McPeek – 2002 Belmont Stakes (G1) win with Sarava, who at odds of 70–1, upset War Emblem's bid for the Triple Crown.

Speed record: (Note: Before 1991, times were measured in fractions. Since then, decimal times to the hundredth have been used. When comparing the fractional times to decimal values, it is racing convention to round the decimal time down to the nearest fifth. Thus A.P. Indy's time of 2:26.13 is considered equivalent to Easy Goer's time of 2:26 flat.)

- 2:24 flat – Secretariat (1973; 1 1/2 miles). Secretariat also holds the fastest 1/2-, 3/4-, 1- and 1 1/4-mile fractions in Belmont history.
- 2:14.20 – Man o' War (1920; 1 3/8 miles)
- 2:56 flat – Harry Bassett (1871; 1 5/8 miles)
- 1:46.53 – Tiz the Law (2020; 1 1/8 miles)
- 2:00.69 – Sovereignty (2025; 1 1/4 miles)

Biggest Margin of Victory:

- 31 lengths – Secretariat (1973)
- 25 Lengths – Count Fleet (1943)
- 20 Lengths – Man o' War (1920)

Most wins by a jockey:

- 6 – Jim McLaughlin (1882, 1883, 1884, 1886, 1887, 1888)
- 6 – Eddie Arcaro (1941, 1942, 1945, 1948, 1952, 1955)

Most wins by a trainer:

- 8 – James G. Rowe Sr. (1883, 1884, 1901, 1904, 1907, 1908, 1910, 1913)

Most wins by an owner:

- 6 – Belair Stud (1930, 1932, 1935, 1936, 1939, 1955)
- 6 – James R. Keene (1879, 1901, 1904, 1907, 1908, 1910)

== Trivia ==
- James G. Rowe Sr. and George M. Odom have each won the Belmont Stakes as a jockey and a trainer.
- On 5 June 1993, thoroughbred racing's all-time leading female jockey, Julie Krone, became the first woman to win a Triple Crown race when she rode to victory in the Belmont Stakes aboard Colonial Affair.
- In 1984, Sarah Lundy became the first female trainer to saddle a horse in the Belmont Stakes, sending out Minstrel Star, who finished eleventh.
- The 2004 race had the biggest attendance in the park's history with 120,139.
- Sarava, at odds of 70–1, upset War Emblem's bid for the Triple Crown.
- Braulio Baeza has the distinction of winning three Belmont Stakes over three different surfaces. He won in his Belmont Stakes debut on 65 to 1 long-shot Sherluck in 1961 at the old Belmont Park, won in 1963 on Chateaugay when the race was run at Aqueduct, and won in 1969 on Arts and Letters at the new Belmont Park.
- Prior to the 2016 running, bay horses had the most victories with 56. Chestnuts were close behind with 54 wins, followed by 33 dark bay/browns. Only three gray/roan horses had won (Belmar in 1895, Native Dancer in 1953, and High Echelon in 1970). In 2016, gray horses swept the top three positions.
- Fifteen Belmont Stakes winners have sired at least one Belmont winner. Leading this list is Man o' War, who sired three subsequent winners — American Flag, Crusader and Triple Crown winner War Admiral.
- Twenty-three horses missed their chance at a Triple Crown by not winning the Belmont. Eight of these finished second: Pensive (1944), Tim Tam (1958), Forward Pass (1968), Majestic Prince (1969), Sunday Silence (1989), Silver Charm (1997), Real Quiet (1998), and Smarty Jones (2004). Five finished third: Northern Dancer (1964), Spectacular Bid (1979), Pleasant Colony (1981), Charismatic (1999), and Funny Cide (2003). Four finished fourth: Kauai King (1966), Canonero II (1971), Alysheba (1987), and California Chrome (2014). Carry Back (1961) finished seventh, War Emblem (2002) finished eighth and Big Brown (2008) did not finish. Finally, three Derby/Preakness winners did not race in the Belmont: Burgoo King (1932), Bold Venture (1936) and I'll Have Another (2012), though I'll Have Another was injured and was scratched the day before his Belmont Stakes in 2012.
- In June 1971, mentalist The Amazing Kreskin predicted that the winner of the next Belmont Stakes "would have an S in the third or fourth letter of his name." The winning horse that year was Pass Catcher.
- On June 10, 2023, Jena M. Antonucci became the first woman to train a winner of an American Triple Crown race, having conditioned Arcangelo to victory in the 2023 Belmont Stakes.

== Fillies in the Belmont ==
Only 24 fillies have run in the Belmont; three of which have won:

- 1867 – Ruthless
- 1905 – Tanya
- 2007 – Rags to Riches

This gives them a respectable 13% win rate when entered. For context, three fillies have won the Kentucky Derby while six have won the Preakness Stakes. On average, fillies have won between 2% and 3% of the Triple Crown races, with similar numbers for geldings; while about 95% of these races have been won by colts. The last filly as of June 11, 2022, to run in the Belmont was in 2022 when Nest ran second (placed) behind the winner her stable mate Mo Donegal.

== Foreign-born winners ==
- 1874 – Saxon (United Kingdom)
- 1898 – Bowling Brook (United Kingdom)
- 1917 – Hourless (United Kingdom)
- 1918 – Johren (United Kingdom)
- 1957 – Gallant Man (Republic of Ireland)
- 1958 – Cavan (Republic of Ireland)
- 1960 – Celtic Ash (United Kingdom)
- 1990 – Go And Go (Republic of Ireland)
- 1998 – Victory Gallop (Canada)

== Winners (since 1867) ==
Triple Crown winners are in bold.

Year	Winner	Jockey	Trainer	Owner	Track	Distance	Track	Time*
2026	Golden Tempo	José Ortiz	Cherie DeVaux	Phipps Stable, St. Elias Stable	Saratoga	1 1/4-miles	Fast	2:03.49
2025	Sovereignty	Junior Alvarado	William I. Mott	Godolphin	Saratoga	1 1/4-miles	Good	2:00.69
2024	Dornoch	Luis Saez	Danny Gargan	West Paces Racing, et al.	Saratoga	1 1/4-miles	Fast	2:01.64
2023	Arcangelo	Javier Castellano	Jena M. Antonucci	Blue Rose Farm	Belmont Park	1 1/2-miles	Fast	2:29.23
2022	Mo Donegal	Irad Ortiz Jr.	Todd A. Pletcher	Repole Stable & Donegal Racing	Belmont Park	1 1/2-miles	Fast	2:28.28
2021	Essential Quality	Luis Saez	Brad H. Cox	Godolphin Stables	Belmont Park	1 1/2-miles	Fast	2:27.11
2020	Tiz the Law	Manny Franco	Barclay Tagg	Sackatoga Stable	Belmont Park	1 1/8-miles	Fast	1:46.53
2019	Sir Winston	Joel Rosario	Mark E. Casse	Tracy Farmer	Belmont Park	1 1/2-miles	Fast	2:28.30
2018	**Justify**	Mike Smith	Bob Baffert	WinStar Farm, et al.	Belmont Park	1 1/2-miles	Fast	2:28.18
2017	Tapwrit	José Ortiz	Todd A. Pletcher	Bridlewood Farm, et al.	Belmont Park	1 1/2-miles	Fast	2:30.02
2016	Creator	Irad Ortiz Jr.	Steven M. Asmussen	WinStar Farm & Bobby Flay	Belmont Park	1 1/2-miles	Fast	2:28.51
2015	**American Pharoah**	Victor Espinoza	Bob Baffert	Zayat Stables, LLC	Belmont Park	1 1/2-miles	Fast	2:26.65
2014	Tonalist	Joel Rosario	Christophe Clement	Robert S. Evans	Belmont Park	1 1/2-miles	Fast	2:28.52
2013	Palace Malice	Mike Smith	Todd A. Pletcher	Dogwood Stable	Belmont Park	1 1/2-miles	Fast	2:30.70
2012	Union Rags	John R. Velazquez	Michael Matz	Phyllis M. Wyeth	Belmont Park	1 1/2-miles	Fast	2:30.42
2011	Ruler on Ice	Jose Valdivia Jr.	Kelly Breen	George and Lori Hall	Belmont Park	1 1/2-miles	Sloppy (sealed)	2:30.88
2010	Drosselmeyer	Mike Smith	William Mott	WinStar Farm LLC	Belmont Park	1 1/2-miles	Fast	2:31.57
2009	Summer Bird	Kent Desormeaux	Tim Ice	Kalarikkal & Vilasini Jayaraman	Belmont Park	1 1/2-miles	Fast	2:27.54
2008	Da'Tara	Alan Garcia	Nick Zito	Robert V. LaPenta	Belmont Park	1 1/2-miles	Fast	2:29.65
2007	Rags to Riches †	John R. Velazquez	Todd A. Pletcher	Michael Tabor & Derrick Smith	Belmont Park	1 1/2-miles	Fast	2:28.74
2006	Jazil	Fernando Jara	Kiaran McLaughlin	Shadwell Farm	Belmont Park	1 1/2-miles	Fast	2:27.86
2005	Afleet Alex	Jeremy Rose	Timothy Ritchey	Cash is King LLC	Belmont Park	1 1/2-miles	Fast	2:28.75
2004	Birdstone	Edgar Prado	Nick Zito	Marylou Whitney Stables	Belmont Park	1 1/2-miles	Fast	2:27.50
2003	Empire Maker	Jerry Bailey	Robert Frankel	Juddmonte Farms	Belmont Park	1 1/2-miles	Sloppy	2:28.26
2002	Sarava	Edgar Prado	Kenneth McPeek	New Phoenix Stable	Belmont Park	1 1/2-miles	Fast	2:29.71
2001	Point Given	Gary Stevens	Bob Baffert	The Thoroughbred Corp.	Belmont Park	1 1/2-miles	Fast	2:26.56
2000	Commendable	Pat Day	D. Wayne Lukas	Bob & Beverly Lewis	Belmont Park	1 1/2-miles	Fast	2:31.19
1999	Lemon Drop Kid	José A. Santos	Scotty Schulhofer	Jeanne G. Vance	Belmont Park	1 1/2-miles	Fast	2:27.88
1998	Victory Gallop	Gary Stevens	W. Elliott Walden	Prestonwood Farm	Belmont Park	1 1/2-miles	Fast	2:29.16
1997	Touch Gold	Chris McCarron	David Hofmans	Frank Stronach	Belmont Park	1 1/2-miles	Fast	2:28.82
1996	Editor's Note	René R. Douglas	D. Wayne Lukas	Overbrook Farm	Belmont Park	1 1/2-miles	Fast	2:28.96
1995	Thunder Gulch	Gary Stevens	D. Wayne Lukas	Michael Tabor	Belmont Park	1 1/2-miles	Fast	2:32.02
1994	Tabasco Cat	Pat Day	D. Wayne Lukas	David P. Reynolds & Overbrook Farm	Belmont Park	1 1/2-miles	Fast	2:26.82
1993	Colonial Affair	Julie Krone	Scotty Schulhofer	Centennial Farms	Belmont Park	1 1/2-miles	Good	2:29.97
1992	A.P. Indy	Ed Delahoussaye	Neil Drysdale	Tomonori Tsurumaki	Belmont Park	1 1/2-miles	Good	2:26.13
1991	Hansel	Jerry Bailey	Frank L. Brothers	Lazy Lane Farm	Belmont Park	1 1/2-miles	Fast	2:28.10
1990	Go And Go	Michael Kinane	Dermot K. Weld	Moyglare Stud Farm	Belmont Park	1 1/2-miles	Good	2:27.20
1989	Easy Goer	Pat Day	C. R. McGaughey III	Ogden Phipps	Belmont Park	1 1/2-miles	Fast	2:26.00
1988	Risen Star	Ed Delahoussaye	Louie J. Roussel III	Louie J. Roussel III	Belmont Park	1 1/2-miles	Fast	2:26.40
1987	Bet Twice	Craig Perret	Jimmy Croll	Blanche P. Levy	Belmont Park	1 1/2-miles	Fast	2:28.20
1986	Danzig Connection	Chris McCarron	Woody Stephens	Henryk de Kwiatkowski	Belmont Park	1 1/2-miles	Sloppy	2:29.80
1985	Creme Fraiche	Eddie Maple	Woody Stephens	Brushwood Stables	Belmont Park	1 1/2-miles	Muddy	2:27.00
1984	Swale	Laffit Pincay Jr.	Woody Stephens	Claiborne Farm	Belmont Park	1 1/2-miles	Fast	2:27.20
1983	Caveat	Laffit Pincay Jr.	Woody Stephens	August Belmont IV	Belmont Park	1 1/2-miles	Fast	2:27.80
1982	Conquistador Cielo	Laffit Pincay Jr.	Woody Stephens	Henryk de Kwiatkowski	Belmont Park	1 1/2-miles	Sloppy	2:28.20
1981	Summing	George Martens	Luis S. Barrera	Charles T. Wilson Jr.	Belmont Park	1 1/2-miles	Fast	2:29.00
1980	Temperence Hill	Eddie Maple	Joseph B. Cantey	Loblolly Stable	Belmont Park	1 1/2-miles	Muddy	2:29.80
1979	Coastal	Ruben Hernandez	David A. Whiteley	William Haggin Perry	Belmont Park	1 1/2-miles	Fast	2:28.60
1978	**Affirmed**	Steve Cauthen	Laz Barrera	Harbor View Farm	Belmont Park	1 1/2-miles	Fast	2:26.80
1977	**Seattle Slew**	Jean Cruguet	William H. Turner Jr.	Karen L. Taylor	Belmont Park	1 1/2-miles	Muddy	2:29.60
1976	Bold Forbes	Ángel Cordero Jr.	Laz Barrera	E. Rodriguez Tizol	Belmont Park	1 1/2-miles	Fast	2:29.00
1975	Avatar	Bill Shoemaker	Tommy Doyle	Arthur A. Seeligson Jr.	Belmont Park	1 1/2-miles	Fast	2:28.20
1974	Little Current	Miguel A. Rivera	Lou Rondinello	Darby Dan Farm	Belmont Park	1 1/2-miles	Fast	2:29.20
1973	**Secretariat**	Ron Turcotte	Lucien Laurin	Meadow Stable	Belmont Park	1 1/2-miles	Fast	**2:24.00**
1972	Riva Ridge	Ron Turcotte	Lucien Laurin	Meadow Stud	Belmont Park	1 1/2-miles	Fast	2:28.00
1971	Pass Catcher	Walter Blum	Eddie Yowell	October House Farm	Belmont Park	1 1/2-miles	Fast	2:30.40
1970	High Echelon	John L. Rotz	John W. Jacobs	Ethel D. Jacobs	Belmont Park	1 1/2-miles	Sloppy	2:34.00
1969	Arts and Letters	Braulio Baeza	J. Elliott Burch	Rokeby Stables	Belmont Park	1 1/2-miles	Fast	2:28.80
1968	Stage Door Johnny	Heliodoro Gustines	John M. Gaver Sr.	Greentree Stable	Belmont Park	1 1/2-miles	Fast	2:27.20
1967	Damascus	Bill Shoemaker	Frank Y. Whiteley Jr.	Edith W. Bancroft	Aqueduct	1 1/2-miles	Fast	2:28.80
1966	Amberoid	William Boland	Lucien Laurin	Reginald N. Webster	Aqueduct	1 1/2-miles	Fast	2:29.60
1965	Hail To All	Johnny Sellers	Eddie Yowell	Zelda Cohen	Aqueduct	1 1/2-miles	Fast	2:28.40
1964	Quadrangle	Manuel Ycaza	J. Elliott Burch	Rokeby Stables	Aqueduct	1 1/2-miles	Fast	2:28.40
1963	Chateaugay	Braulio Baeza	James P. Conway	Darby Dan Farm	Aqueduct	1 1/2-miles	Good	2:30.20
1962	Jaipur	Bill Shoemaker	Bert Mulholland	George D. Widener Jr.	Belmont Park	1 1/2-miles	Fast	2:28.80
1961	Sherluck	Braulio Baeza	Harold Young	Jacob Sher	Belmont Park	1 1/2-miles	Fast	2:29.20
1960	Celtic Ash	Bill Hartack	Thomas J. Barry	Joseph E. O'Connell	Belmont Park	1 1/2-miles	Fast	2:29.20
1959	Sword Dancer	Bill Shoemaker	J. Elliott Burch	Brookmeade Stable	Belmont Park	1 1/2-miles	Sloppy	2:28.40
1958	Cavan	Pete Anderson	Thomas J. Barry	Joseph E. O'Connell	Belmont Park	1 1/2-miles	Fast	2:30.20
1957	Gallant Man	Bill Shoemaker	John A. Nerud	Ralph Lowe	Belmont Park	1 1/2-miles	Fast	2:26.60
1956	Needles	David Erb	Hugh L. Fontaine	D & H Stable	Belmont Park	1 1/2-miles	Fast	2:29.80
1955	Nashua	Eddie Arcaro	Jim Fitzsimmons	Belair Stud	Belmont Park	1 1/2-miles	Fast	2:29.00
1954	High Gun	Eric Guerin	Max Hirsch	King Ranch	Belmont Park	1 1/2-miles	Fast	2:30.80
1953	Native Dancer	Eric Guerin	Bill Winfrey	Alfred G. Vanderbilt Jr.	Belmont Park	1 1/2-miles	Fast	2:28.60
1952	One Count	Eddie Arcaro	Oscar White	Sarah F. Jeffords	Belmont Park	1 1/2-miles	Fast	2:30.20
1951	Counterpoint	Dave Gorman	Sylvester Veitch	Cornelius V. Whitney	Belmont Park	1 1/2-miles	Fast	2:29.00
1950	Middleground	William Boland	Max Hirsch	King Ranch	Belmont Park	1 1/2-miles	Fast	2:28.60
1949	Capot	Ted Atkinson	John M. Gaver Sr.	Greentree Stable	Belmont Park	1 1/2-miles	Fast	2:30.20
1948	**Citation**	Eddie Arcaro	Horace A. Jones	Calumet Farm	Belmont Park	1 1/2-miles	Fast	2:28.20
1947	Phalanx	Ruperto Donoso	Sylvester Veitch	Cornelius V. Whitney	Belmont Park	1 1/2-miles	Fast	2:29.40
1946	**Assault**	Warren Mehrtens	Max Hirsch	King Ranch	Belmont Park	1 1/2-miles	Fast	2:30.80
1945	Pavot	Eddie Arcaro	Oscar White	Walter M. Jeffords Sr.	Belmont Park	1 1/2-miles	Fast	2:30.20
1944	Bounding Home	Gayle Smith	Matthew P. Brady	William Ziegler Jr.	Belmont Park	1 1/2-miles	Fast	2:32.20
1943	**Count Fleet**	Johnny Longden	Don Cameron	Fannie Hertz	Belmont Park	1 1/2-miles	Fast	2:28.20
1942	Shut Out	Eddie Arcaro	John M. Gaver Sr.	Greentree Stable	Belmont Park	1 1/2-miles	Fast	2:29.20
1941	**Whirlaway**	Eddie Arcaro	Ben A. Jones	Calumet Farm	Belmont Park	1 1/2-miles	Fast	2:31.00
1940	Bimelech	Fred A. Smith	William A. Hurley	Edward R. Bradley	Belmont Park	1 1/2-miles	Fast	2:29.60
1939	Johnstown	James Stout	Jim Fitzsimmons	Belair Stud	Belmont Park	1 1/2-miles	Fast	2:29.60
1938	Pasteurized	James Stout	George M. Odom	Carol Harriman Plunkett	Belmont Park	1 1/2-miles	Fast	2:29.40
1937	**War Admiral**	Charley Kurtsinger	George Conway	Glen Riddle Farm	Belmont Park	1 1/2-miles	Fast	2:28.60
1936	Granville	James Stout	Jim Fitzsimmons	Belair Stud	Belmont Park	1 1/2-miles	Fast	2:30.00
1935	**Omaha**	Willie Saunders	Jim Fitzsimmons	Belair Stud	Belmont Park	1 1/2-miles	Sloppy	2:30.60
1934	Peace Chance	Wayne D. Wright	Pete Coyne	Joseph E. Widener	Belmont Park	1 1/2-miles	Fast	2:29.20
1933	Hurryoff	Mack Garner	Henry McDaniel	Joseph E. Widener	Belmont Park	1 1/2-miles	Fast	2:32.60
1932	Faireno	Tommy Malley	Jim Fitzsimmons	Belair Stud	Belmont Park	1 1/2-miles	Fast	2:32.80
1931	Twenty Grand	Charley Kurtsinger	James G. Rowe Jr.	Greentree Stable	Belmont Park	1 1/2-miles	Fast	2:29.60
1930	**Gallant Fox**	Earl Sande	Jim Fitzsimmons	Belair Stud	Belmont Park	1 1/2-miles	Good	2:31.60
1929	Blue Larkspur	Mack Garner	Herbert J. Thompson	Edward R. Bradley	Belmont Park	1 1/2-miles	Sloppy	2:32.80
1928	Vito	Clarence Kummer	Max Hirsch	Alfred H. Cosden	Belmont Park	1 1/2-miles	Fast	2:33.20
1927	Chance Shot	Earl Sande	Pete Coyne	Joseph E. Widener	Belmont Park	1 1/2-miles	Fast	2:32.40
1926	Crusader	Albert Johnson	George Conway	Glen Riddle Farm	Belmont Park	1 1/2-miles	Sloppy	2:32.20
1925	American Flag	Albert Johnson	Gwyn R. Tompkins	Glen Riddle Farm	Belmont Park	1 3/8-miles	Fast	2:16.80
1924	Mad Play	Earl Sande	Sam Hildreth	Rancocas Stable	Belmont Park	1 3/8-miles	Good	2:18.80
1923	Zev	Earl Sande	Sam Hildreth	Rancocas Stable	Belmont Park	1 3/8-miles	Good	2:19.00
1922	Pillory	Charles H. Miller	Thomas J. Healey	Richard T. Wilson Jr.	Belmont Park	1 3/8-miles	Fast	2:18.80
1921	Grey Lag	Earl Sande	Sam Hildreth	Rancocas Stable	Belmont Park	1 3/8-miles	Fast	2:16.80
1920	Man o' War	Clarence Kummer	Louis Feustel	Glen Riddle Farm	Belmont Park	1 3/8-miles	Fast	2:14.20
1919	**Sir Barton**	Johnny Loftus	H. Guy Bedwell	J. K. L. Ross	Belmont Park	1 3/8-miles	Fast	2:17.40
1918	Johren	Frank Robinson	Albert Simons	Harry P. Whitney	Belmont Park	1 3/8-miles	Fast	2:20.40
1917	Hourless	James H. Butwell	Sam Hildreth	August Belmont Jr.	Belmont Park	1 3/8-miles	Good	2:17.80
1916	Friar Rock	Everett Haynes	Sam Hildreth	August Belmont Jr.	Belmont Park	1 3/8-miles	Muddy	2:22.00
1915	The Finn	George Byrne	Edward W. Heffner	Harry C. Hallenbeck	Belmont Park	1 3/8-miles	Fast	2:18.40
1914	Luke McLuke	Merritt C. Buxton	John F. Schorr	John W. Schorr	Belmont Park	1 3/8-miles	Fast	2:20.00
1913	Prince Eugene	Roscoe Troxler	James G. Rowe Sr.	Harry P. Whitney	Belmont Park	1 3/8-miles	Fast	2:18.00
1912	No races held due to the Hart–Agnew Law.							
1911	No races held due to the Hart–Agnew Law.							
1910	Sweep	James H. Butwell	James G. Rowe Sr.	James R. Keene	Belmont Park	1 3/8-miles	Fast	2:22.00
1909	Joe Madden	Eddie Dugan	Sam Hildreth	Sam Hildreth	Belmont Park	1 3/8-miles	(not listed)	2:21.60
1908	Colin	Joe Notter	James G. Rowe Sr.	James R. Keene	Belmont Park	1 3/8-miles	(not listed)	N/A
1907	Peter Pan	George Mountain	James G. Rowe Sr.	James R. Keene	Belmont Park	1 3/8-miles	(not listed)	N/A
1906	Burgomaster	Lucien Lyne	John W. Rogers	Harry P. Whitney	Belmont Park	1 3/8-miles	(not listed)	2:20.00
1905	Tanya ‡	Gene Hildebrand	John W. Rogers	Harry P. Whitney	Belmont Park	1 1/4-miles	(not listed)	2:08.00
1904	Delhi	George M. Odom	James G. Rowe Sr.	James R. Keene	Morris Park	1 1/4-miles	Fast	2:06.60
1903	Africander	John Bullman	Richard O. Miller	Hampton Stable	Morris Park	1 3/8-miles	Fast	2:21.75
1902	Masterman	John Bullman	John J. Hyland	August Belmont Jr.	Morris Park	1 3/8-miles	Fast	2:22.60
1901	Commando	Henry Spencer	James G. Rowe Sr.	James R. Keene	Morris Park	1 3/8-miles	Fast	2:21.00
1900	Ildrim	Nash Turner	H. Eugene Leigh	H. Eugene Leigh	Morris Park	1 3/8-miles	Fast	2:21.25
1899	Jean Bereaud	Richard Clawson	Sam Hildreth	Sydney Paget	Morris Park	1 3/8-miles	Fast	2:23.00
1898	Bowling Brook	Fred Littlefield	R. Wyndham Walden	Alfred Hennen Morris & Dave Hennen Morris	Morris Park	1 3/8-miles	Heavy	2:32.00
1897	Scottish Chieftain	Joe Scherrer	Matt Byrnes	Marcus Daly	Morris Park	1 3/8-miles	Fast	2:23.25
1896	Hastings	Henry Griffin	John J. Hyland	Belmont Stable	Morris Park	1 3/8-miles	Good	2:24.50
1895	Belmar	Fred Taral	Edward Feakes	Preakness Stables	Morris Park	1 1/4-miles	Heavy	2:11.50
1894	Henry of Navarre	Willie Simms	Byron McClelland	Byron McClelland	Morris Park	1 1/8-miles	Fast	1:56.50
1893	Comanche	Willie Simms	Gus Hannon	Empire Stable	Morris Park	1 1/8-miles	Fast	1:53.25
1892	Patron	William Hayward	Louis Stuart	Louis Stuart	Morris Park	1 1/4-miles	Muddy	2:17.00
1891	Foxford	Edward H. Garrison	Michael Donavan	C. E. Rand	Morris Park	1 1/4-miles	Good	2:08.75
1890	Burlington	Shelby "Pike" Barnes	Albert Cooper	Hough Bros.	Morris Park	1 1/4-miles	Fast	2:07.75
1889	Eric	William Hayward	John Huggins	A. J. Cassatt	Jerome Park	1 1/2-miles	Good	2:47.25
1888	Sir Dixon	Jim McLaughlin	Frank McCabe	Dwyer Bros. Stable	Jerome Park	1 1/2-miles	Fast	2:40.25
1887	Hanover	Jim McLaughlin	Frank McCabe	Dwyer Bros. Stable	Jerome Park	1 1/2-miles	Heavy	2:43.50
1886	Inspector B	Jim McLaughlin	Frank McCabe	Dwyer Bros. Stable	Jerome Park	1 1/2-miles	Fast	2:41.00
1885	Tyrant	Patsy Duffy	William R. Claypool	James B. A. Haggin	Jerome Park	1 1/2-miles	Good	2:43.00
1884	Panique	Jim McLaughlin	James G. Rowe Sr.	Dwyer Bros. Stable	Jerome Park	1 1/2-miles	Good	2:42.00
1883	George Kinney	Jim McLaughlin	James G. Rowe Sr.	Dwyer Bros. Stable	Jerome Park	1 1/2-miles	Fast	2:42.50
1882	Forester	Jim McLaughlin	Lewis Stewart	Appleby & Johnson	Jerome Park	1 1/2-miles	Fast	2:43.00
1881	Saunterer	Tom Costello	R. Wyndham Walden	George L. Lorillard	Jerome Park	1 1/2-miles	Heavy	2:47.00
1880	Grenada	Lloyd Hughes	R. Wyndham Walden	George L. Lorillard	Jerome Park	1 1/2-miles	Good	2:47.00
1879	Spendthrift	George Evans	Thomas Puryear	James R. Keene	Jerome Park	1 1/2-miles	Sloppy	2:42.75
1878	Duke of Magenta	Lloyd Hughes	R. Wyndham Walden	George L. Lorillard	Jerome Park	1 1/2-miles	Muddy	2:43.50
1877	Cloverbrook	Cyrus Holloway	Jeter Walden	Edwin Augustus Clabaugh	Jerome Park	1 1/2-miles	Heavy	2:46.00
1876	Algerine	William Donohue	Thomas W. Doswell	Doswell & Co.	Jerome Park	1 1/2-miles	Fast	2:40.50
1875	Calvin	Robert Swim	Ansel Williamson	H. Price McGrath	Jerome Park	1 1/2-miles	Fast	2:42.25
1874	Saxon	George Barbee	William Pryor	Pierre Lorillard IV	Jerome Park	1 1/2-miles	Fast	2:39.50
1873	Springbok	James G. Rowe Sr.	David McDaniel	David McDaniel	Jerome Park	1 5/8-miles	Fair	3:01.75
1872	Joe Daniels	James G. Rowe Sr.	David McDaniel	David McDaniel	Jerome Park	1 5/8-miles	Fair	2:58.25
1871	Harry Bassett	W. Miller	David McDaniel	David McDaniel	Jerome Park	1 5/8-miles	Fast	2:56.00
1870	Kingfisher	Edward D. Brown	Raleigh Colston Sr.	Daniel Swigert	Jerome Park	1 5/8-miles	Fast	2:59.50
1869	Fenian	C. Miller	Jacob Pincus	August Belmont	Jerome Park	1 5/8-miles	Heavy	3:04.25
1868	General Duke	Robert Swim	Andrew Thompson	McConnell & Co.	Jerome Park	1 5/8-miles	Fast	3:02.00
1867	Ruthless †	Gilbert Patrick	A. Jack Minor	Francis Morris	Jerome Park	1 5/8-miles	Heavy	3:05.00

- Note: Timed to the 1/4 second 1867 to 1901 and 1903, and to the 1/5 second in 1902 and from 1904 to 1991. Decimal timing, to the nearest 1/100, is now used, though race calls and many charts still use fifths.

A † designates a filly.

== Sire lines ==
Winners of the Belmont Stakes can be connected to each other due to the practice of arranging horse breeding based on their previous success. All of the horses can be traced back to the three foundational sires, with Godolphin Arabian the ancestor of 18 winners, Byerley Turk the ancestor of 14 winners, and Darley Arabian the ancestor of 125 winners, including all winners since 2009.

The Mr Prospector direct sire line has produced 3 of the last 4 Belmont Stakes winners, most recently Golden Tempo in 2026.

=== Darley Arabian line ===
- the Darley Arabian (1700c) sire line (all branched through the Eclipse (1764) line) produced 126 Stakes winners (121 colts, 2 geldings, 3 fillies), including all winners from 2009 to present. The main branches of this sire line are:
  - the Joe Andrews (1778) branch produced 1 winner (most recently Saxon in 1874)
  - the King Fergus (1775) branch (all branched through the Voltigeur (1847) line), produced 15 winners. His sire line continued primarily through his son Vedette (1854) with 13 winners, due primarily to his son Galopin (1872) with 10 winners (exclusively through St Simon (1881), most recently Colonial Affair in 1993)
  - the Potoooooooo (1773) branch produced 110 winners (all branched through the Waxy (1790) line). The primary branch of this sire line is through Whalebone (1807), which has produced 108 winners. In turn, the primary branch continues through Sir Hercules (1826), which has produced 86 winners, and then the Birdcatcher (1833) branch which produced 80 winners. From Birdcatcher, the branch of The Baron (1842) has produced 72 winners (nearly exclusively through the Stockwell (1849) line with 71 winners). Birdcatcher's grandson Doncaster (1870) sired Bend Or (1877), whose sire line accounts for 66 winners. The main branch of the Bend Or sire line continued through his son Bona Vista (1889) with 58 winners, exclusively through the Phalaris (1913) line, which has dominated in the last several decades (including all winners from 2009 to present) through the following sons:
    - the Pharamond (1925) branch (1 winner, most recently Capot in 1949);
    - the Sickle (1924) branch (26 winners exclusively through Native Dancer (1950) with his win in the 1953 Belmont Stakes, continued primarily through his son Raise a Native (1961) with 23 winners, down through Mr Prospector (1970) with 20 winners through 11 different sons: Conquistador Cielo, with his win in the 1982 Belmont Stakes, and 10 other sons through their progeny (most recently Golden Tempo in 2026), continued primarily through his son Fappiano (1977) with 6 winners (nearly exclusively through his son Unbridled (1987) with 5 winners, most recently Arcangelo in 2023));
    - the Pharos (1920) branch (31 winners all branched through the Nearco (1935) line, through his sons Mossborough (1947), Royal Charger (1942), Nearctic (1954), and Nasrullah (1940)). The Mossborough branch produced 1 winner (most recently Cavan in 1958), The Royal Charger branch produced 4 winners (most recently Temperence Hill in 1980), the Nearctic branch produced 10 winners (nearly exclusively through his son Northern Dancer (1961) with 9 winners, most recently Sovereignty in 2025), while the Nasrullah branch produced 16 winners, (most recently Mo Donegal in 2022), primarily through his son Bold Ruler (1954) with 13 winners primarily through his son Boldnesian (1963) with 9 winners (exclusively through the Seattle Slew (1974) line, with his win in the 1977 Belmont Stakes and 8 other progeny, nearly exclusively through A.P. Indy, winner of the 1992 Belmont Stakes and 6 other progeny winners, with 5 winners through A.P. Indy's son Pulpit (1994) (exclusively through Pulpit's son Tapit (2001)), most recently Essential Quality in 2021).
    - special notes:
      - the Whalebone (1807) branch produced two main lines: the primary branch of Sir Hercules (1826), and the secondary branch of Camel (1822) which produced 18 winners (exclusively through the Touchstone (1831) line). The Camel branch continued primarily through two of this grandsons: the Newminster (1848) branch (8 winners, primarily through the Bay Ronald (1893) line with 6 winners, most recently Creme Fraiche in 1985) and the Orlando (1841) branch (9 winners, exclusively through the Eclipse (1855) line, most recently Shut Out in 1942).
      - the Sir Hercules (1826) branch produced two main lines: the primary branch of Birdcatcher (1833), and the secondary branch of Faugh-a-Ballagh (1841) which produced 6 winners (exclusively through the Leamington (1853) line), most recently 1894 Belmont Stakes winner Henry of Navarre.
      - the Birdcatcher (1833) branch produced two main lines: the primary branch of The Baron (1842), and the secondary branch of Oxford (1857) which produced 7 winners (exclusively through the Sterling (1868) line), most recently 1964 Belmont Stakes winner Quadrangle.
      - the Bend Or (1877) branch produced two main lines: the primary branch of Bona Vista (1889), and the secondary branch of Ormonde (1883) which produced 7 winners (exclusively through the Teddy (1913) line), most recently 1967 Belmont Stakes winner Damascus.

=== Godolphin Arabian line ===
- the Godolphin Arabian (1724c) sire line produced 18 colts. The main branches of this sire (all branched through the West Australian (1850) line) are:
  - the Solon (1861) branch produced 2 winners (exclusively through the Ogden (1894) line, most recently Zev in 1923)
  - the Australian (1858) branch produced 16 winners, including:
    - Joe Daniels (1869), winner of the 1872 Belmont Stakes
    - Springbok (1870), winner of the 1873 Belmont Stakes
    - the Abd-El-Kader (1865) branch produced 1 winner (most recently Algerine in 1876)
    - the Spendthrift (1876) branch produced 13 winners, including his win in the 1879 Belmont Stakes and 12 progeny including:
      - the Kingston (1884) branch produced 1 winner (most recently Ildrim in 1900)
      - the Hastings (1893) branch produced 11 winners (his win in the 1896 Belmont Stakes and 10 progeny, including 1902 Belmont Stakes winner Masterman (1899) and 9 winners through the Fair Play (1905) line, with 5 winners primarily through the Man o' War (1917) line, with his win in the 1920 Belmont Stakes plus 4 winners through his progeny, most recently Da'Tara in 2008)

=== Byerley Turk line ===
- the Byerley Turk (1680c) sire line produced 14 winners (13 colts, 1 gelding). The main branches of this sire (all branched through the Herod (1758) line) are:
  - the Florizel (1768) branch produced 7 winners (all branched through the Boston (1833) line). The main branches of this sire line are:
    - the Ringgold (1842) branch produced 1 winner (most recently Calvin in 1875)
    - the Lexington (1850) branch produced 6 winners (most recently Eric in 1889)
  - the Woodpecker (1773) branch produced 7 winners (all branched through the Buzzard (1787) line). The main branches of this sire line are:
    - the Castrel (1801) branch produced 2 winners (all branched through the Pantaloon (1824) line, most recently Huryoff in 1933)
    - the Selim (1802) branch produced 5 winners (all branched through the Sultan (1816) line). The main branches of this sire line are:
      - the Bay Middleton (1833) branch produced 1 winner (most recently Amberoid in 1966)
      - the Glencoe (1831) branch produced 4 winners (all branched through the Hindoo (1878) line), including Hanover, winner of the 1887 Belmont Stakes and 3 other progeny (most recently Prince Eugene in 1913)

Belmont Stakes winners with male-line descendants including other Belmont Stakes winners

- Native Dancer (1953 winner) – 25 colts; most recently Golden Tempo (2026)
- Spendthrift (1879 winner) – 12 colts; most recently Da' Tara (2008)
- Hastings (1896 winner) – 10 colts; most recently Da' Tara (2008)
- Seattle Slew (1977 winner) – 8 colts; most recently Essential Quality (2021)
- Commando (1901 winner) – 6 colts; most recently Shut Out (1942)
- A.P. Indy (1992 winner) – 6 colts; most recently Essential Quality (2021)
- Man o' War (1920 winner) – 4 colts; most recently Da' Tara (2008)
- Peter Pan (1907 winner) – 3 colts; most recently Shut Out (1942)
- Gallant Fox (1930 winner) – 2 colts; most recently Granville (1936)
- Count Fleet (1943 winner) – 2 colts; most recently One Count (1952)
- Duke of Magenta (1878 winner) – 1 colt; Eric (1889)
- Hanover (1887 winner) – 1 colt; Joe Madden (1909)
- The Finn (1915 winner) – 1 colt; Zev (1923)
- Chance Shot (1927 winner) – 1 colt; Peace Chance (1934)
- Friar Rock (1916 winner) – 1 colt; Phalanx (1947)
- Sword Dancer (1959 winner) – 1 colt; Damascus (1967)
- Secretariat (1973 winner) – 1 colt; Risen Star (1988)
- Thunder Gulch (1995 winner) – 1 colt; Point Given (2001)
- Birdstone (2004 winner) – 1 colt; Summer Bird (2009)
- Empire Maker (2003 winner) – 1 colt; American Pharoah (2015)

== See also ==
- American thoroughbred racing top attended events
- Belmont Stakes top three finishers
- Grand Slam of Thoroughbred Racing
- List of Belmont Stakes broadcasters
- Triple Crown of Thoroughbred Racing
- Triple Crown Productions
