= 1888 Belmont Stakes =

American horse race

22nd Belmont Stakes
- Belmont Stakes
- Location: Jerome Park Racetrack; The Bronx, New York, U.S.
- Date: June 9, 1888
- Distance: 1 1/2 mi (12 furlongs; 2,400 m)
- Winning horse: Sir Dixon
- Winning time: 2:40 1/4
- Final odds: 0.36 to 1
- Jockey: Jim McLaughlin
- Trainer: Frank McCabe
- Owner: Dwyer Brothers Stable
- Conditions: Fast
- Surface: Dirt

The 1888 Belmont Stakes was the 22nd running of the Belmont Stakes and the 22nd time it was held at Jerome Park Racetrack in The Bronx, New York where it had been first run in 1867. It was run on June 9, 1888. The race drew only two starters who both carried 118 pounds. It was won by heavily favored Sir Dixon whose winning time was 2:40¼ over a distance of 1½ miles on a dirt track rated fast.

Jockey Jim McLaughlin aboard Sir Dixon won his sixth Belmont Stakes, a record that still stands through the 2018 running, and one that has been equaled only by Eddie Arcaro in 1955.

== Results ==
Finished	Post	Horse	Jockey	Trainer	Owner	Odds	Time / behind	Win $
1	1	Sir Dixon	Jim McLaughlin	Frank McCabe	Dwyer Brothers Stable	0.36	2:40.25	$3,440
2	2	Prince Royal	P. Godfrey	James G. Rowe Sr.	August Belmont Sr.	10.00	12	

- Winning Breeder: Ezekiel F. Clay & Catesby Woodford breeding partnership (KY)
