= Rhett Butler (horse) =

Thoroughbred racehorse

- Sire: Galileo
- Grandsire: Saddler's Wells
- Dam: Rags to Riches
- Damsire: A.P. Indy
- Sex: Stallion
- Foaled: 2011
- Country: Ireland
- Color: Chestnut
- Owner: Voja Ivanović, Serbia
- Trainer: Petar Stefanović
- Record: 16: 8-3-1

Rhett Butler (foaled 26 March 2011, in Ireland) is an Irish bred racehorse who raced in Serbia and Hungary. By champion sire Galileo and out of the Belmont Stakes winner Rags to Riches, he won 8 out of 16 races in Serbia and Hungary and was named Champion Older Horse, Champion Long Distance Horse and HOTY in Hungary in 2016 and Champion Older Horse and HOTY in Serbia in 2017.

== Races won ==
=== Serbia ===
- Kup Princa Pavla G1 (2400 m)
- Grad Beograde G3 (2200 m)
- Kup Srema (Listed) (2200 m)
- Memorijal Darka Filipovića (L) (1800 m)
- Kup Ljubičeva G1 (2400 m)
- Djurdjevdan (L) (1600 m)
- Eldorado (L) (2000 m)

=== Hungary ===
- Kinscem Dij (L) (2000 m)
