= 1949 Belmont Stakes =

American horse race

81st Belmont Stakes
- Belmont Stakes
- Location: Belmont Park; Elmont, New York, U.S.
- Date: June 11, 1949
- Distance: 1 1/2 mi (12 furlongs; 2,414 m)
- Winning horse: Capot
- Winning time: 2:30 1/5
- Jockey: Ted Atkinson
- Trainer: John M. Gaver Sr.
- Owner: Greentree Stable
- Conditions: Fast
- Surface: Dirt

The 88th Belmont Stakes was an American Grade I stakes Thoroughbred horse race held at Belmont Park in Elmont, New York on June 11, 1949. From the fourteen starters, Capot won the race under a ride much praised in the media by future Hall of Fame jockey Ted Atkinson. While Capot had won the Preakness Stakes, there was no Triple Crown at stake as second-place finisher Ponder had won the Kentucky Derby.

The 1949 Belmont Stakes carried a gross purse of $91,500 which went to the first four finishers with the nominator of each of the top three horses receiving $2000, $1,000, and $500, respectively.

Results of the Race
Horse	Jockey	Trainer	Owner	Odds To $1	Earnings US$
Capot	Ted Atkinson	John M. Gaver Sr.	Greentree Stable	5.60	$60,900
Ponder	Steve Brooks	Ben Jones	Calumet Farm	.80	$15,000
Palestinian	Eddie Arcaro	Hirsch Jacobs	Isidor Bieber	2.25	$7,500
Sun Barham	Carson Kirk	Thomas D. Rodrock	Mrs. Eben H. Ellison Jr.	23.00	$3,750
Halt	Shelby N. Clark	Woody Stephens	Woodvale Farm (Royce G. Martin)	64.80	
Old Rockport	Gordon Glisson	Richard T. Watts	Clifford H. Mooers	12.30	
Saint Nicholas	Harold Keene	Wilbur Borton	J. Graham Brown	28.10	
Engel Man	Vincent Nodarse	William O. Hicks	David Shaer	196.50	

- Winning breeder: Greentree Stud, Inc.
