= 1910 Belmont Stakes =

American horse race

44th Belmont Stakes
- Belmont Stakes
- Location: Belmont Park; Elmont, New York, U.S.A.
- Date: May 30, 1910
- Distance: 1 3/8 mi (11 furlongs; 2,213 m)
- Winning horse: Sweep
- Winning time: 2:22.00
- Jockey: James Butwell
- Trainer: James G. Rowe Sr.
- Owner: James R. Keene
- Conditions: Fast
- Surface: Dirt

The 1910 Belmont Stakes was the 44th running of the Belmont Stakes. It was the 6th Belmont Stakes held at Belmont Park and was run on May 30. The race drew only two starters and was won by future U.S. Racing Hall of Fame jockey James Butwell riding the favorite Sweep. The colt cantered most of the way and won by six lengths with ease, reflected in the slow time of 2:22 flat for the 1 3/8 miles on dirt.

At age two, Sweep had won the Belmont Futurity Stakes and his performances in 1909 earned him American Champion Two-Year-Old Male Horse. His successes in 2010 earned him the Three-Year-Old Champion nation honors. For jockey Butwell the win was his first in the Belmont with a second coming in the 1917 edition. For another future Hall of Fame inductee, trainer James Rowe won the seventh of his record eight career wins in the Belmont Stakes. Owner James R. Keene's win marked his third Belmont Stakes triumph in four years and a record sixth overall. His record was equaled in 1955 by the Belair Stud Stable.

The 1910 Preakness Handicap was run on May 7 and the 1910 Kentucky Derby three days later on May 10. The Belmont was run twenty days after the Derby. The 1919 Belmont Stakes marked the first time the race was recognized as the third leg of a U.S. Triple Crown series.

As a result of New York State's Hart–Agnew anti-betting legislation, which contained penalties allowing for fines and up to a year in prison, racing ended in 1910. For the next two years racetracks in New York were closed. The Belmont Stakes would not be run again until 1913.

== Results ==
Finish	Post	Horse	Jockey	Trainer	Owner	Time / behind	Earnings US$
1	1	Sweep	James Butwell	James G. Rowe Sr.	James R. Keene	2:22 0/0	$8,700 + $1,000 gold plate
2	2	Duke of Ormonde	Vincent Powers	Charles J. Casey	Ormondale Stable (William O'Brien Macdonough)	6 lengths	

- Winning breeder: James R. Keene (KY)
- Times: 1/4 mile 0:25 1/5; 1/2 mile – 0:51 0/0; 3/4 mile – 1:16 0/0; mile – 1:41 0/0; 1 3/16 (final) – 2:22 0/0.
- Track condition: fast
