= Jerome Park =

Public park in the West Bronx, New York City

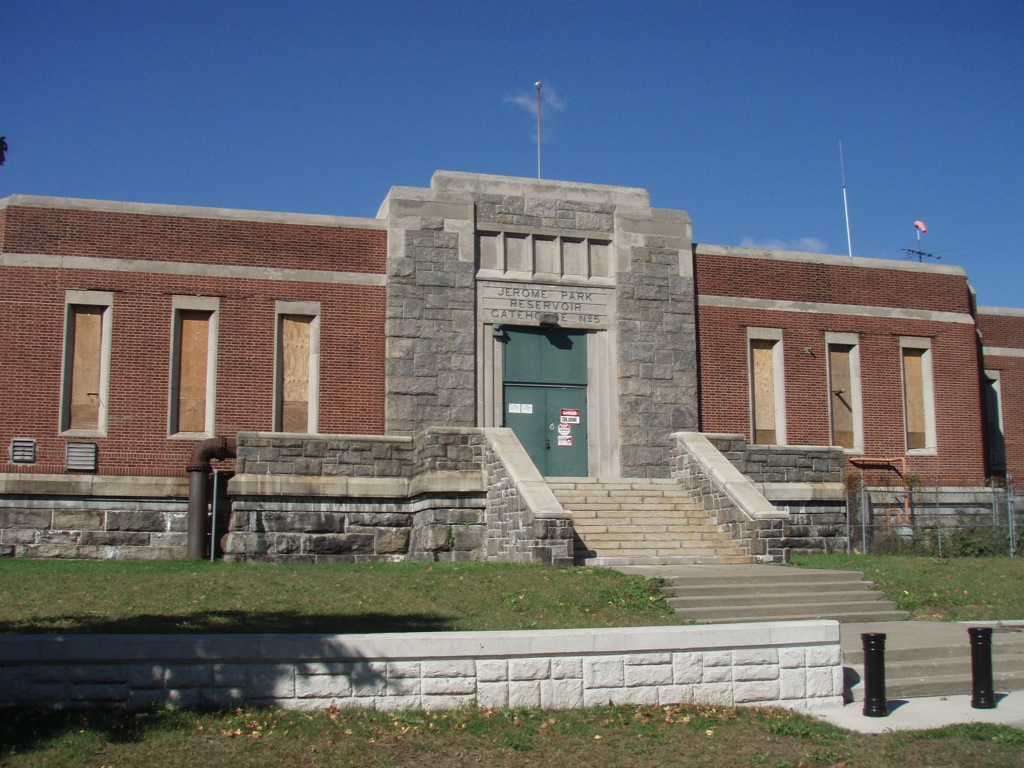
- Gatehouse No. 5 in Jerome Park.
- Interactive map of Jerome Park
- Type: Public park; municipal park
- Location: The Bronx, NY, US
- Coordinates: 40.88468°N 73.89104°W
- Area: 4.36 acres (1.76 ha)
- Opened: April 4, 1940
- Etymology: Leonard W. Jerome; Jerome Park Racetrack
- Operator: New York City Department of Parks and Recreation
- Status: open all year
- Public transit: Subway: at Bedford Park Boulevard–Lehman College station Bus: Bx1, Bx2
- Park ID: X137
- Website: www.nycgovparks.org/parks/jerome-park/

Jerome Park is a municipal park in the West Bronx of New York City. The park, along with the surrounding neighborhood of the same name, are both on land that was once Jerome Park Racetrack, which was founded by Leonard W. Jerome, grandfather of Winston Churchill. The park occupies a long and narrow strip of land between Jerome Park Reservoir and Goulden avenue. Neighboring the park are two "Education Mile" institutions: The Bronx High School of Science, and DeWitt Clinton High School. Harris Park, another New York City Department of Parks and Recreation property, is another neighbor. The Jerome Park Reservoir and its surroundings (including the park) were further developed under the federal Works Progress Administration. The park opened on April 4, 1940.

In June 2022, the Amateur Astronomers Association of New York (City) proposed relocating a public observatory to the park at the suggestion of The Bronx High School of Science. The proposed observatory was previously in use at Nassau Community College for more than 40 years. The 12-foot tall, 6-foot diameter observatory has enough space for 3 people.
