= 1935 Belmont Stakes =

American horse race

67th Belmont Stakes
- Belmont Stakes
- Location: Belmont Park; Elmont, New York, U.S.
- Date: June 8, 1935
- Distance: 1 1/2 mi (12 furlongs; 2,414 m)
- Winning horse: Omaha
- Winning time: 2:30 3/5
- Jockey: Willie "Smokey" Saunders
- Trainer: Jim Fitzsimmons
- Owner: Belair Stud
- Conditions: Good
- Surface: Dirt

The 1935 Belmont Stakes was the 67th running of the Belmont Stakes. It was the 29th Belmont Stakes held at Belmont Park in Elmont, New York and was held on June 8, 1935. With a field of five horses, Omaha, the winner of that year's Preakness Stakes and Kentucky Derby won the 1 1/2–mile race (12 f; 2.4 km) by 1 1/2 lengths over Firethorn.

With the win, Omaha became the third Triple Crown champion, and the only second-generation Triple Crown champion as of 2025 (his sire Gallant Fox won the Triple Crown in 1930).

== Results ==
Finish	PP	Horse	Jockey	Trainer	Owner	Final odds	Earnings US$
1	3	Omaha	Willie Saunders	Jim Fitzsimmons	Belair Stud Stable	7–10	$66,040
2	2	Firethorn	Raymond Workman	Preston M. Burch	Walter M. Jeffords Sr.	6–1	$7,500
3	5	Rosemont	Wayne D. Wright	Richard E. Handlen	Foxcatcher Farm Stable	13–5	$3,000
4	1	Cold Shoulder	Sam Renick	Joseph H. Stotler	Alfred G. Vanderbilt II	10–1	$1,000
5	4	Sir Beverley	Tommy Malley	Jim Fitzsimmons	Belair Stud Stable	7–10	$1,000
