= Ruthless (horse) =

19th-century American Thoroughbred racehorse

- Sire: Eclipse
- Grandsire: Orlando
- Dam: Barbarity
- Damsire: Simoon
- Sex: Filly
- Foaled: 1864
- Country: United States
- Colour: Bay
- Breeder: Francis Morris
- Owner: Francis Morris
- Trainer: A. Jack Minor
- Record: 11 starts, 7-4-0
- Earnings: $11,000 (approximately $253,000 as of 2025)

Major wins
- Nursery Stakes (1866); Sequel Stakes (1867); Travers Stakes (1867); American Classics wins: Belmont Stakes (1867)

Honours
- United States Racing Hall of Fame (1975); Ruthless Stakes at Aqueduct Racetrack

Ruthless (1864–1876) was an American Thoroughbred filly and a National Museum of Racing and Hall of Fame-inducted racehorse. She is best known as the winner of the inaugural Belmont Stakes.

== Early life ==
Owned and bred by Francis Morris of New York, she was foaled on Morris's farm at Throgg's Neck, New York. Ruthless was sired by the imported stallion Eclipse (born 1855) and out of the imported mare Barbarity who also produced several other award-winning daughters collectively known as the "Barbarous Battalion". The other "Battalion" members, all full sisters, were Remorseless, Relentless, Regardless, and Merciless. Barbarity was an 1854 bay mare sired by Simoon and her dam was named Dam who was sired by Buzzard, Eclipse was sired by Orlando and out of the mare Gaze by Bay Middleton. and was imported at the same time as Eclipse.

== Racing career ==
As a two-year-old, Ruthless won the Nursery Stakes in 1866. This was the inaugural running of the race, which took place at Jerome Park Racetrack and was a 1 mile (1,600 meters) race restricted to two-year-olds. Her jockey was Davidson and she carried 97 pounds (44 kilograms) for the win. Second place was Maid of Honor and third was Monday. The value to the winner was $2,450 (approximately $54,000 as of 2025) and the winning time was 1 minute 49 seconds. She won by six lengths, and the correspondent for The New York Times commented that she finished the race "galloping along as if she was at exercise".

On June 4, 1867, Ruthless ran in the Jersey Derby at Paterson, New York. This was a 1 1/2 miles (2,400 m) race for three-year-olds, and Ruthless placed second to her stablemate Monday, who won by two lengths. On June 19, 1867, Ruthless beat out De Courcey by a head at Jerome Park Racetrack to win the inaugural running of the Belmont Stakes. The winner's share of the purse was $1,850 (approximately $43,000 as of 2025) and the winning time was 3 minutes and 5 seconds. Her jockey was Gilbert Patrick, later inducted into the Hall of Fame, whose name was often abbreviated to "Gilpatrick" in the race results. The race was run at a distance of 1 5/8 miles (2,600 m) and the track was heavy. Rivoli came in third and the last place horse was Monday, also owned by Morris. Morris had originally intended Monday to win the race, but De Courcey's speed was such that Ruthless' jockey, in an attempt to help out Monday, managed to win the race. The correspondent for The New York Times called it a "splendid race home" and "a most exciting finish", as Ruthless won by "a short neck". Although seven other horses had originally been entered, the speed of Morris' two horses was such that they all forfeited the race rather than face Monday and Ruthless. Since Ruthless' victory, only two other fillies have won the Belmont Stakes. Tanya did it in 1905 and Rags to Riches in 2007.

Ruthless also won the 1867 Travers Stakes which was run at 1 3/4 miles (2,800 m). The winning time was 3 minutes 13 1/4 seconds, and she carried 103 pounds (47 kg). The second-place finisher was R. B. Connolly and third place went to De Courcey. The race added $2,850 (approximately $66,000 as of 2025) to her earnings. Again her jockey was Gilbert Patrick. There was one false start for the race, but she took the lead at the half-mile pole and never lost it, winning the race in a gallop by two horselengths.

In October 1867, Ruthless lost the St Leger Race at the Paterson Racetrack in Paterson, New York. This was a 2 1/4 miles (3,600 m) race, and she came in second to De Courcey, but managed to beat Number Three (owned also by Morris), Jubal and Clement.

Ruthless ended her racing career with a record of 11 starts, placing first 7 times and 4 second-place finishes. Her earnings were $11,000 (approximately $253,000 as of 2025) on the racetrack.

== Breeding career ==
As a broodmare, Ruthless was the dam of the stakes-winning colt Battle Axe. He was an 1871 bay stallion sired by Monday, and in 1873 he won the Kentucky Stakes. She died in 1876, after being shot by a hunter who was on her owner's farm in Westchester, New York.

== Posthumous honors ==
The Ruthless Stakes is named in her honor. It is run at Aqueduct Racetrack and is a race for three-year-old fillies only, at a distance of six furlongs. Ruthless was inducted in the National Museum of Racing and Hall of Fame in 1975. The racing journalist, W. S. Vosburgh, considered her to be the best three-year-old of her racing year.

Pedigree of Ruthless, bay mare, 1864
| Sire Eclipse | Orlando | Touchstone | Camel |
| Sire Eclipse | Orlando | Touchstone | Banter |
| Sire Eclipse | Orlando | Vulture | Langar |
| Sire Eclipse | Orlando | Vulture | Kite |
| Sire Eclipse | Gaze | Bay Middleton | Sultan |
| Sire Eclipse | Gaze | Bay Middleton | Cobweb |
| Sire Eclipse | Gaze | Flycatcher | Godolphin |
| Sire Eclipse | Gaze | Flycatcher | Sister to Cobweb |
| Dam Barbarity | Simoon | Camel | Whalebone |
| Dam Barbarity | Simoon | Camel | Selim Mare |
| Dam Barbarity | Simoon | Sea-Breeze | Paulowitz |
| Dam Barbarity | Simoon | Sea-Breeze | Zephyretta |
| Dam Barbarity | Buzzard mare | Buzzard | Blacklock |
| Dam Barbarity | Buzzard mare | Buzzard | Miss Newton |
| Dam Barbarity | Buzzard mare | Donna Maria | Partisan |
| Dam Barbarity | Buzzard mare | Donna Maria | Donna Clara (family: 32) |

== See also ==
- List of racehorses
