= 1943 Belmont Stakes =

American horse race

75th Belmont Stakes
- Belmont Stakes
- Grade I stakes race
- Location: Belmont Park; Elmont, New York, U.S.
- Date: June 5, 1943
- Distance: 1 1/2 mi (12 furlongs; 2,414 m)
- Winning horse: Count Fleet
- Winning time: 2:28 1/5
- Jockey: Johnny Longden
- Trainer: Don Cameron
- Owner: Fannie Hertz
- Conditions: Fast
- Surface: Dirt

The 1943 Belmont Stakes was the 75th running of the Belmont Stakes. It was the 37th Belmont Stakes held at Belmont Park in Elmont, New York and was held on June 5, 1943. With a field of three horses, heavily favored Count Fleet, the winner of that year's Kentucky Derby and Preakness Stakes won the 1 1/2–mile race (12 f; 2.4 km) by 25 lengths over Fairy Manhurst.

With the win, Count Fleet became the sixth U. S. Triple Crown champion.

== Results ==
Finish	PP	Horse	Jockey	Trainer	Owner	Final odds	Earnings US$
1	2	Count Fleet	Johnny Longden	Don Cameron	Fannie Hertz	.05	$35,340
2	1	Fairy Manhurst	John Gilbert	Richard E. Handlen	Foxcatcher Farm	28.85	$5,000
3	3	Deseronto	James Stout	James E. Fitzsimmons	Beverley Bogert	52.70	$2,500

- Winning breeder: Fannie Hertz; (KY)

== Payout ==
Horse	Straight
Count Fleet	$2.10

- Based on a $2 wager. No place or show wagers sold.
