= 1920 Belmont Stakes =

American horse race

52nd Belmont Stakes
- Belmont Stakes
- Grade I stakes race
- Location: Belmont Park; Elmont, New York, U.S.
- Date: June 12, 1920
- Winning horse: Man o' War
- Winning time: 2:14 1/5
- Jockey: Clarence Kummer
- Trainer: Louis Feustel
- Owner: Glen Riddle Farm
- Conditions: Fast
- Surface: Dirt

The 1920 Belmont Stakes was the 52nd running of the Belmont Stakes. It was the 14th Belmont Stakes held at Belmont Park in Elmont, New York and was held on June 12, 1920. With a field of only two horses, heavily favored Man o' War won the 1 3/8–mile race (11 f; 2.2 km) by 20 lengths over Donnacona.

Man o' War's time of 2:14.2 set a world record for 1 3/8–mile.

This was the last edition of the Belmont Stakes to be raced in a clockwise direction, with turns to the right. The following year, the track switched to counterclockwise racing, which has continued to this day.

== Results ==
| Finish | PP | Horse | Jockey | Trainer | Owner | Final odds | Earnings US$ |
|---|---|---|---|---|---|---|---|
| 1 | 1 | Man o' War | Clarence Kummer | Louis Feustel | Glen Riddle Farm | 1–25 | $7,700 |
| 2 | 2 | Donnacona | Newton Barrett | Max Hirsch | George W. Loft | 20–1 | $1,500 |
