= Rags to Riches (horse) =

American-bred Thoroughbred racehorse (2004–2025)

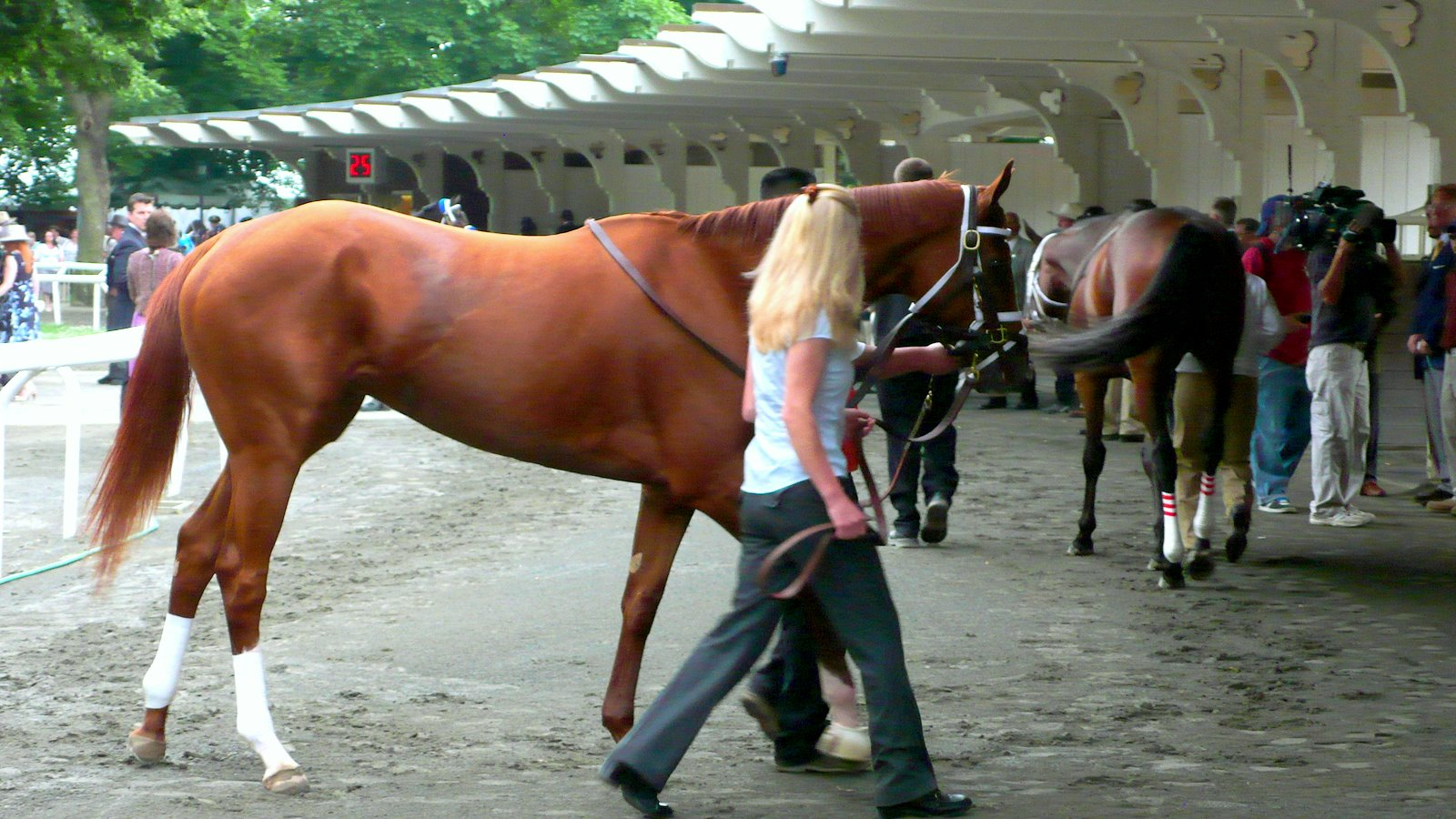
- Rags to Riches in the paddock area at Belmont Park during the day of the Belmont Stakes (June 9, 2007)
- Sire: A.P. Indy
- Grandsire: Seattle Slew
- Dam: Better Than Honour
- Damsire: Deputy Minister
- Sex: Mare
- Foaled: February 27, 2004; Kentucky, U.S.
- Died: November 24, 2025 (aged 21)
- Country: United States
- Colour: Chestnut
- Breeder: Skara Glen Stables
- Owner: Michael Tabor & Derrick Smith
- Trainer: Todd Pletcher
- Record: 7: 5-1-0
- Earnings: US$1,340,028

Major wins
- Las Virgenes Stakes (2007); Santa Anita Oaks (2007); Kentucky Oaks (2007); Triple Crown race wins: Belmont Stakes (2007)

Awards
- NTRA "Moment of the Year" (2007); World Champion 3-year-old Filly (2007); American Champion Three-Year-Old Filly (2007)

Honours
- Rags to Riches Invitational Stakes (2016) at Belmont Park; Rags to Riches Stakes (2013– ) at Churchill Downs

Rags to Riches (February 27, 2004 – November 24, 2025) was an American Thoroughbred champion racehorse who won the 2007 Belmont Stakes, the first filly to win it in over a century.

== Background ==
Rags to Riches was a chestnut mare sired by 1992 U.S. Horse of the Year and U.S. Racing Hall of Fame inductee A.P. Indy. She was out of the mare Better Than Honour, who also produced the 2006 Belmont Stakes winner, Jazil.

Bred by Skara Glen Stables, Rags to Riches was purchased for US$1.9 million in September 2005 at the Keeneland Sales by the partnership of Michael Tabor & Derrick Smith.

== Racing career ==
=== Early career ===
Sent to the track at age two under trainer Todd Pletcher, Rags to Riches made her first start at Churchill Downs in a 5½-furlong maiden race on June 10, 2006, finishing fourth.

=== 2007: Three-year-old season ===
Brought back to competition on January 7, 2007, she won her first race at Santa Anita Park by six lengths. A month later, ridden by Garrett Gomez, she won the 8-furlong Las Virgenes Stakes after running five wide for a good part of the race. In March, she drew away to win the 1-mile Grade I Santa Anita Oaks by 5½ lengths. Made the betting favorite for the prestigious Grade I Kentucky Oaks at Churchill Downs, she won by 4¼ lengths over a field that included the 2006 U.S. Champion 2-Yr-Old Filly and Breeders' Cup Juvenile Fillies winner, Dreaming of Anna.

==== Belmont Stakes ====
On June 5, 2007, the handlers of Rags to Riches announced that she would run in the third and longest leg of the U.S. Triple Crown, the Belmont Stakes. It was her first start against males.

In the race, Rags to Riches stumbled out of the starting gate but recovered to move within striking distance of the pacesetters. At the top of the stretch, she dueled head-to-head with Preakness Stakes and eventual Horse of the Year winner Curlin. Curlin put his nose in front briefly, but the filly fought back and beat him to the finish line by a head. Rags to Riches' win made her only the third filly to ever win the Belmont and the first since Tanya in 1905. She was also the first filly to win the race at the current 1½-mile distance at Belmont Park. (The race distance has varied: from 1867 until 1873, it was 1 5/8 miles (2.6 km). In 1874, the distance was reduced to 1 1/2 miles (2.4 km), and from 1890 to 1892, and in 1895, the distance was 1 1/4 miles (2.0 km). From 1896 until 1925, the distance was increased to 1 3/8 miles (2.2 km). In 1926, the race distance was set at the present 1 1/2 miles (2.4 km)). Tanya's win came 38 years after Ruthless captured the inaugural running of the Belmont in 1867.

Belmont Park track announcer Tom Durkin called the race:

"Here comes Hard Spun. And Curlin is coming through in between horses! And Rags to Riches is coming with a four-wide sweep! And Tiago is behind them. And at the top of the stretch, a filly is in front at the Belmont! But Curlin is right there with her! These two, in a battle of the sexes at the Belmont Stakes! It is Curlin on the inside – Rags to Riches on the outside. A desperate finish: Rags to Riches and Curlin! They're coming down to the wire. It's gonna be very close! And it's gonna be. ... a filly in the Belmont! Rags to Riches has beaten Curlin and a hundred years of Belmont history! The first filly to win it in over a century!"

==== Later 2007 season ====
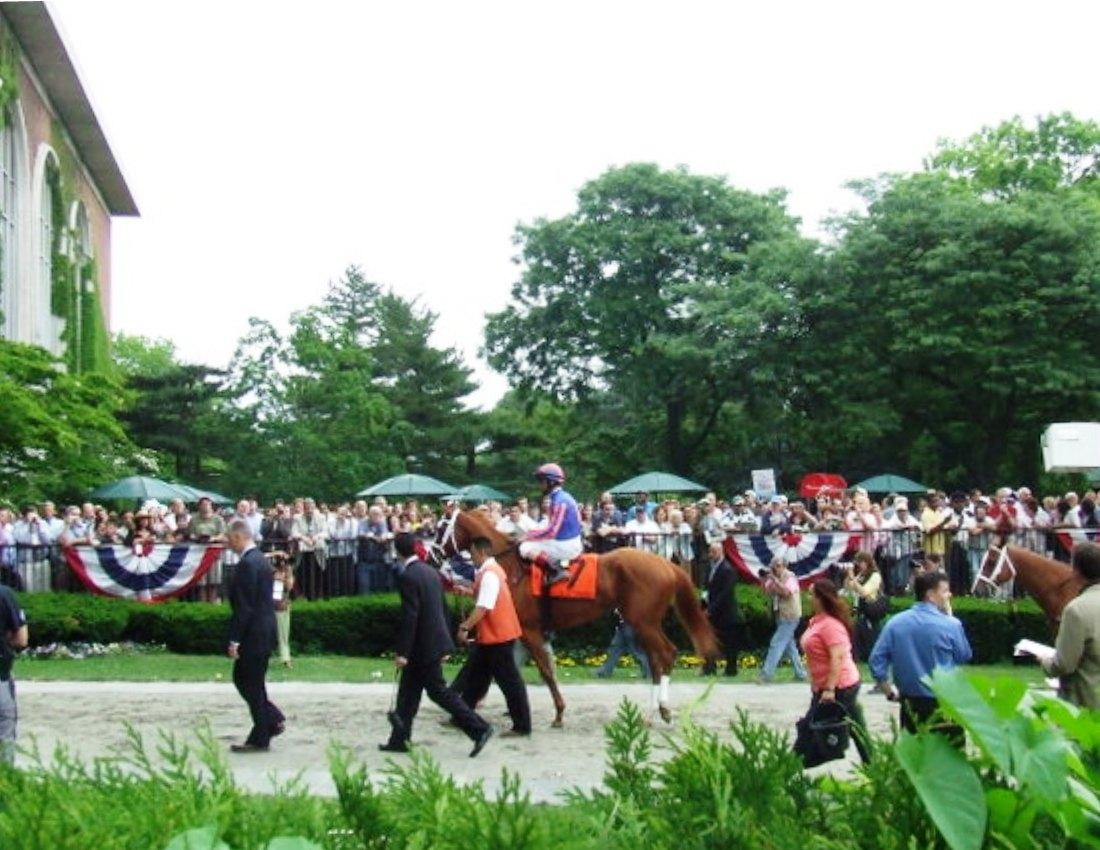
Rags to Riches in the paddock area at Belmont Park

Despite several minor medical problems over the summer, Rags to Riches continued to train at Belmont Park towards the 2007 Breeder's Cup. She made her return to the races in the $250,000 Gazelle Stakes at Belmont Park on September 15 and finished second to Lear's Princess. It was announced the next day, September 16, that X-rays had revealed a hairline fracture in her right front pastern, and that her trainer, Todd Pletcher, had taken her out of training. She was expected to make a full recovery and return to racing in 2008.

Rags to Riches received several honors at the end of her three-year-old season. Among voters, she was a Teen Choice Award nominee for Choice Female Athlete in 2007. She was also named 2007 World Champion 3-year-old filly by the International Federation of Horseracing Authorities (IFHA).

=== 2008: Four-year-old season ===
Rags to Riches resumed training at age 4. Then, on March 24, 2008, Todd Pletcher announced that she had re-injured her right front pastern and that she was retiring. Rags to Riches' career resulted in five wins in seven starts and $1.3 million in earnings.

== Breeding career ==
Rags to Riches was sent to Ashford Stud in Versailles, Kentucky where she had her first foal and was exported to Ireland in 2009. She was returned to America for the 2016 breeding season. That year, she was bred to Triple Crown winner American Pharoah, but she did produce a foal, so she was bred to Uncle Mo instead and produced a colt in 2017.

After not being bred for 2022, she was covered by Munnings for 2023 and then Uncle Mo for 2024.

Rags to Riches progeny:

- Opulence (foaled March 9, 2009), chestnut mare sired by Giant's Causeway. She did not race, and retired to broodmare duties, she produced three colts in the USA (by Stay Thirsty, colt now deceased; colt by Shanghai Bobby named The Bobby, unsuccessful racehorse, gelded, and retired; colt by Verrazano, who raced in Japan as Fort Wadsworth and is retired) before being exported to Japan, where she produced one named colt (Strike Rich, by American Pharoah), two named fillies (Tiffany Donna, by Duramente; Earl Grey, by Suave Richard), and two unnamed colts by Suave Richard and Admire Mars as of 2026.
- Admirer (foaled March 17, 2010, in Ireland), bay colt by Henrythenavigator. Did not place in one career start and is listed as deceased as of 2019.
- Rhett Butler (foaled March 26, 2011 in Ireland), chestnut colt sired by Galileo. Group I winner and multiple champion in Serbia and Hungary. He stands in Serbia at stud as of 2020.
- Rich and Righteous (foaled April 18, 2012, in Ireland), bay gelding sired by Galileo. Broke his maiden in Dubai on dirt, March 2016. Has since retired.
- Never So Few (foaled April 24, 201,3 in Ireland), bay horse sired by Galileo. Unplaced in six starts, all in America. Stands stud in Argentina as a Polo and racing stallion.
- Rather Special (foaled May 19, 2014, in Ireland), chestnut filly sired by Galileo. Unraced. As a broodmare, she has produced a gelding by American Pharoah (2018) named Grand Revival, who won on the flat and competed over hurdles in Europe, and five consecutive fillies; the one by Uncle Mo (2019) is deceased, while the one by American Pharoah (2020) is unraced, and she had two by Justify (2021 and 2022)–the former named Gilded Edge who won at Monmouth on July 21, 2024, while the latter was a $200,000 yearling and named Rather Distinct–and the final one by Munnings (2023).
- Stratification (foaled March 17, 2016, in Kentucky). Chestnut mare sired by Australia. Placed in England, she has since retired to broodmare duties, having produced a Justify colt in 2021 named Danon Strada, a colt by Lord Kanaloa in 2022, and a Kitasan Black colt in 2024, all in Japan.
- Bay colt by Uncle Mo (foaled April 30, 2017, in Kentucky).
- Gray or roan gelding by Tapit (foaled April 25, 2018, in Kentucky).
- Chestnut colt by Curlin (foaled April 24, 2019, in Kentucky).
- Chestnut colt by American Pharoah (foaled May 9, 2020, in Kentucky).
- Chestnut colt by Justify (foaled June 2, 2021, in Kentucky).
- Chestnut filly by Munnings (foaled February 8, 2023, in Kentucky).
- Bay colt by Uncle Mo (foaled March 10, 2024, in Kentucky).

In 2016, the New York Racing Association created a new race in her honor, the Rags to Riches Invitational Stakes. It was run on the Friday before the Belmont Stakes at 1½ miles. It was the only dirt race in the U.S. at longer than 1¼ miles for fillies and mares. Theogony won the inaugural running on June 10, defeating four other fillies and mares by eight lengths. The event was held once. Churchill Downs has held the Rags to Riches Stakes since 2013.

== Death ==
Rags to Riches died on November 24, 2025, at the age of 21. Her reported cause of death was infirmities of old age.

== Racing statistics ==
Date	Race	Racecourse	Grade	Distance	Finish	Margin	Time	Weight	Odds	Jockey	Ref
Jun 10, 2006	Maiden	Churchill Downs		4 1/2 Furlongs	4	(7 3/4 lengths)	1:03.55	119 lbs	3.20	Brice Blanc	
Jan 7, 2007	Maiden	Santa Anita Park		7 Furlongs	1	6 lengths	1:22.40	121 lbs	2.30	Garrett K. Gomez	
Feb 10, 2007	Las Virgenes Stakes	Santa Anita Park	|	1 mile	1	3/4 length	1:37.85	116 lbs	2.70*	Garrett K. Gomez	
Mar 11, 2007	Santa Anita Oaks	Santa Anita Park	|	1 1/16 miles	1	5 1/2 lengths	1:42.84	122 lbs	0.40*	Garrett K. Gomez	
May 4, 2007	Kentucky Oaks	Churchill Downs	|	1 1/8 miles	1	4 1/4 lengths	1:49.99	121 lbs	1.50*	Garrett K. Gomez	
Jun 9, 2007	Belmont Stakes	Belmont Park	|	1 1/2 miles	1	head	2:28.74	124 lbs	4.30	John R. Velazquez	
Sep 15, 2007	Gazelle Stakes	Belmont Park	|	1 1/8 miles	2	( 1/2 length)	1:47.86	122 lbs	0.45*	John R. Velazquez	

== Pedigree ==
Pedigree of Rags to Riches
Sire A.P. Indy	Seattle Slew	Bold Reasoning	Boldnesian
Sire A.P. Indy	Seattle Slew	Bold Reasoning	Reason To Earn
Sire A.P. Indy	Seattle Slew	My Charmer	Poker
Sire A.P. Indy	Seattle Slew	My Charmer	Fair Charmer
Sire A.P. Indy	Weekend Surprise	Secretariat	Bold Ruler
Sire A.P. Indy	Weekend Surprise	Secretariat	Somethingroyal
Sire A.P. Indy	Weekend Surprise	Lassie Dear	Buckpasser
Sire A.P. Indy	Weekend Surprise	Lassie Dear	Gay Missile
Dam Better Than Honour	Deputy Minister	Vice Regent	Northern Dancer
Dam Better Than Honour	Deputy Minister	Vice Regent	Victoria Regina
Dam Better Than Honour	Deputy Minister	Mint Copy	Bunty's Flight
Dam Better Than Honour	Deputy Minister	Mint Copy	Shakney
Dam Better Than Honour	Blush With Pride	Blushing Groom	Red God
Dam Better Than Honour	Blush With Pride	Blushing Groom	Runaway Bride
Dam Better Than Honour	Blush With Pride	Best In Show	Traffic Judge
Dam Better Than Honour	Blush With Pride	Best In Show	Stolen Hour
