= Tanya (horse) =

American-bred Thoroughbred racehorse

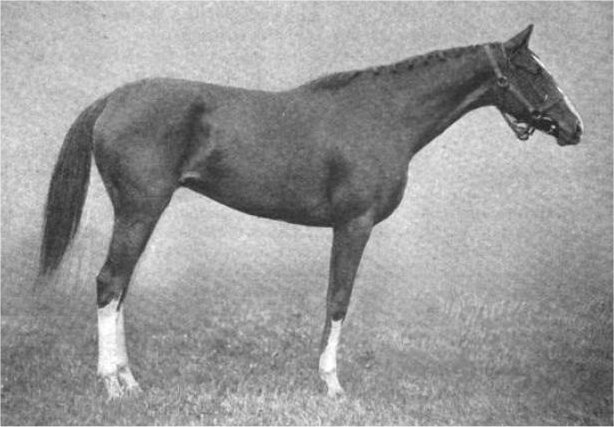
- Circa 1904
- Sire: Meddler
- Grandsire: St. Gatien
- Dam: Handspun
- Damsire: Hanover
- Sex: Filly
- Foaled: 1902
- Country: United States
- Colour: Chestnut
- Breeder: William Collins Whitney
- Owner: Harry Payne Whitney
- Trainer: John W. Rogers
- Record: 12: 6-2-1
- Earnings: $71,372

Major wins
- Hopeful Stakes (1904); National Stallion Stakes (1904); Spinaway Stakes (1904); Triple Crown Race wins: Belmont Stakes (1905)

Awards
- American Co-Champion Two-Year-Old Filly (1904); American Co-Champion Three-Year-Old Filly (1905)
- Last updated on December 15, 2020

Tanya (1902–1929) was an American Thoroughbred racehorse bred and raised in Kentucky. She was bred by William Collins Whitney and foaled at his Brookdale Farm in Lincroft, New Jersey. Sired by the outstanding English stallion Meddler, she was out of the mare Handspun.

Before Tanya could set foot on a track, William Whitney died. She, along with several other racers for the Whitney stable, was leased to Herman Duryea. As a 2-year-old, she won the Hopeful Stakes, the National Stallion Stakes, and the Spinaway Stakes under his colors.

== 1905 Belmont Stakes ==
Tanya is best known as one of three fillies to ever win the Belmont Stakes. Purchased for $7,000 by Whitney's son, Harry Payne Whitney, Tanya was trained by future Hall of Fame inductee John W. Rogers. Ridden by the 1904 U. S. Champion Jockey Gene Hildebrand, on May 24, 1905, the filly won the Belmont Stakes in its first running at the new Belmont Park. She beat second-place finisher Blandy and her half-brother Hot Shot, another Meddler colt, in a time of 2:08 3/5. The Belmont Stakes distance was one mile and a quarter in 1905.

Tanya was the second filly to win the Belmont Stakes after Ruthless won the inaugural race in 1867. The race was not won by another filly for more than a century, when Rags to Riches won in 2007.

== Pedigree ==
Pedigree of Tanya, chestnut filly, 1902
Sire Meddler	St. Gatien	The Rover	Blair Athol
Sire Meddler	St. Gatien	The Rover	Crinon
Sire Meddler	St. Gatien	Saint Editha	Kingley Vale
Sire Meddler	St. Gatien	Saint Editha	Lady Alice
Sire Meddler	Busybody	Petrarch	Lord Clifden
Sire Meddler	Busybody	Petrarch	Laura
Sire Meddler	Busybody	Spinaway (1872)	Macaroni
Sire Meddler	Busybody	Spinaway (1872)	Queen Bertha
Dam Handspun	Hanover	Hindoo	Virgil
Dam Handspun	Hanover	Hindoo	Florence
Dam Handspun	Hanover	Bourbon Belle	Bonnie Scotland
Dam Handspun	Hanover	Bourbon Belle	Ella D
Dam Handspun	Spinaway (1878)	Leamington	Faugh-a-Ballagh
Dam Handspun	Spinaway (1878)	Leamington	Pantaloon mare
Dam Handspun	Spinaway (1878)	Megara	Eclipse
Dam Handspun	Spinaway (1878)	Megara	Ulrica (family: 11)

== See also ==
- List of racehorses
