= Jerome Park Racetrack =

Horse racing course in the Bronx, New York

Coordinates: 40°52′42″N 73°53′43″W

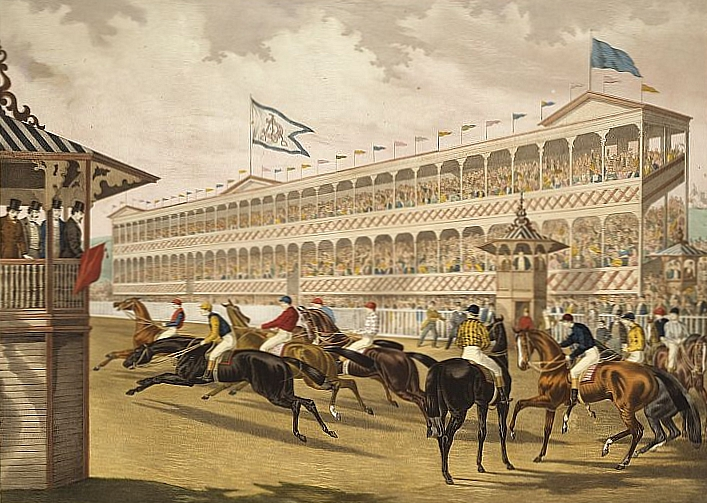
Jerome Park Racetrack, 1868

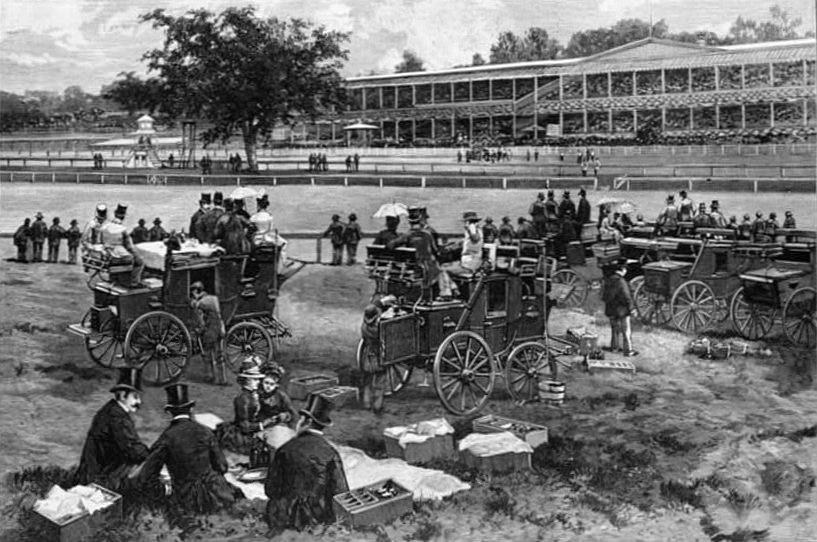
Coaches at the racetrack, 1886

Jerome Park Racetrack was an American thoroughbred horse racing facility from 1866 until 1894. It was located in a part of Westchester County, New York that was annexed into the city of New York in 1874. Jerome Park Racetrack was the first home of the Belmont Stakes, holding the event from 1867 until 1889. Today, Jerome Park is the name of a neighborhood adjoining the Jerome Park Reservoir, Bedford Park and Norwood in the northern Bronx.

== History ==
The racetrack opened in 1866 in the northwest part of Fordham, Westchester County (now in the Bronx), New York. Built on the old Bathgate estate, and operated by the American Jockey Club, its owner/members were led by financier Leonard W. Jerome and August Belmont, Sr. A luxurious clubhouse was built near a rise that looked over the race course on what was known as "The Bluff".

In those days, many would come to the racing park by horse, coach and carriage, or by railroad at Fordham Station, located at the bottom of Fordham Hill and Rose Hill in Old Fordham Village. Later in the century, it would connect to Bedford Park Station.

The first Belmont Stakes, the oldest of the three U.S. Triple Crown races which was named in honor of August Belmont, Sr., was held at Jerome Park Racetrack and continued to be run there until 1890 when it was moved to nearby Morris Park Racecourse. Jerome Park Racetrack was also the home to the Champagne Stakes from its inaugural running in 1867 through 1889 and the Ladies Handicap, created in 1868 and which today is run at Aqueduct Racetrack in Queens and is the oldest stakes race in the United States exclusively for fillies and mares.

In the spring of 1876, a group of polo enthusiasts founded the Westchester Polo Club at Jerome Park Racetrack. On May 13 of that year, the track was the site of the first outdoor polo match ever held in the United States.

It is alleged that Lord Randolph Churchill first met Jerome's daughter, Jennie Jerome, later to be courted and married, at the race park, but this allegation is false. As attested by Sir Winston Churchill in his biography of his father, Lord Randolph Churchill was never in America before his marriage, and the couple actually met in August 1873 at a ball on board the Imperial Russian cruiser "Ariadne" while it was moored at Cowes on the Isle of Wight.

The track closed on October 4, 1894 to make way for the Jerome Park Reservoir that was needed for the metropolitan New York City water supply system.

== Thoroughbred stakes races at Jerome Park ==
- Belmont Stakes
- Champagne Stakes
- Juvenile Stakes
- Ladies Handicap

== Later land usage ==
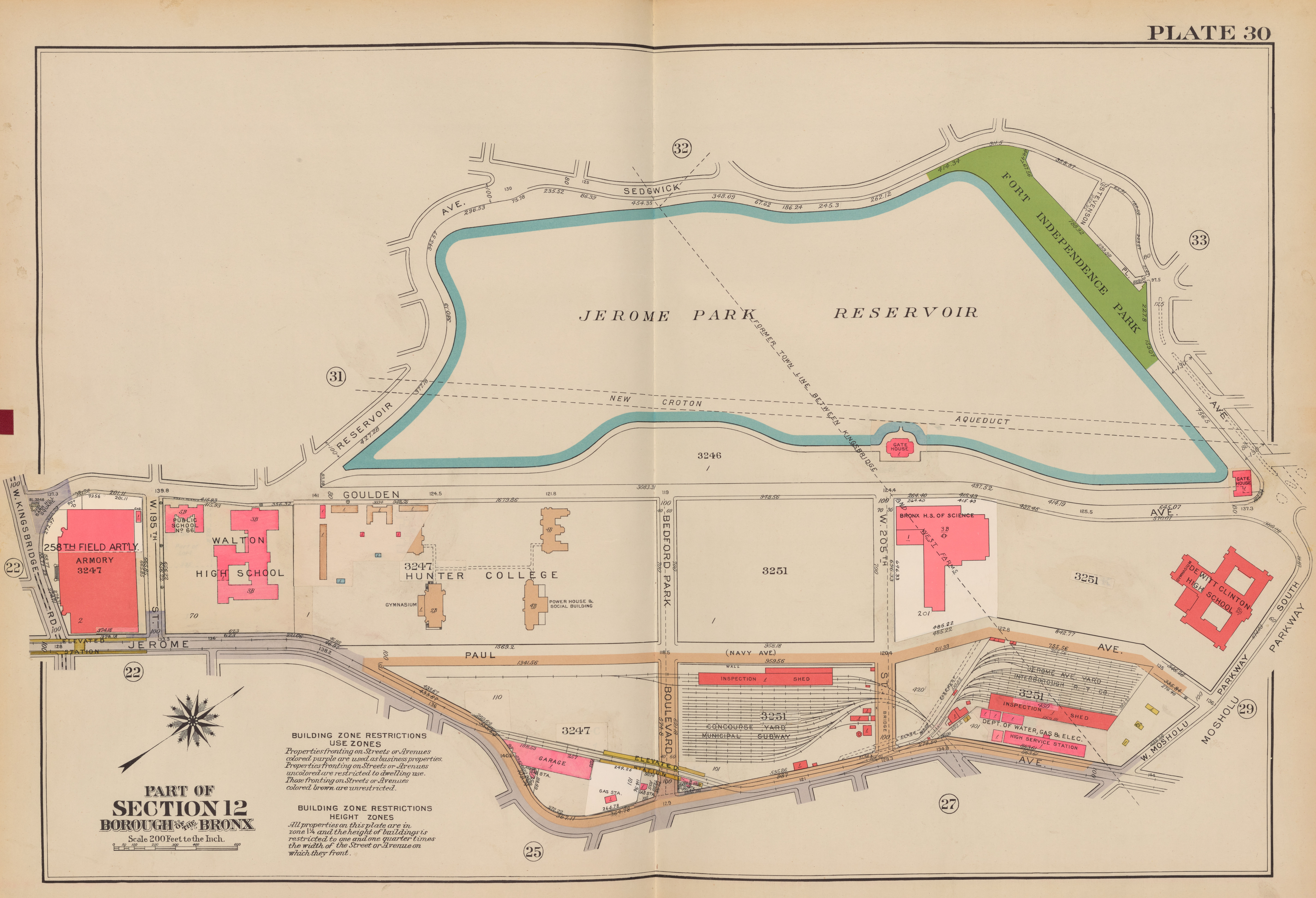
Bromley map of Jerome Park in 1957

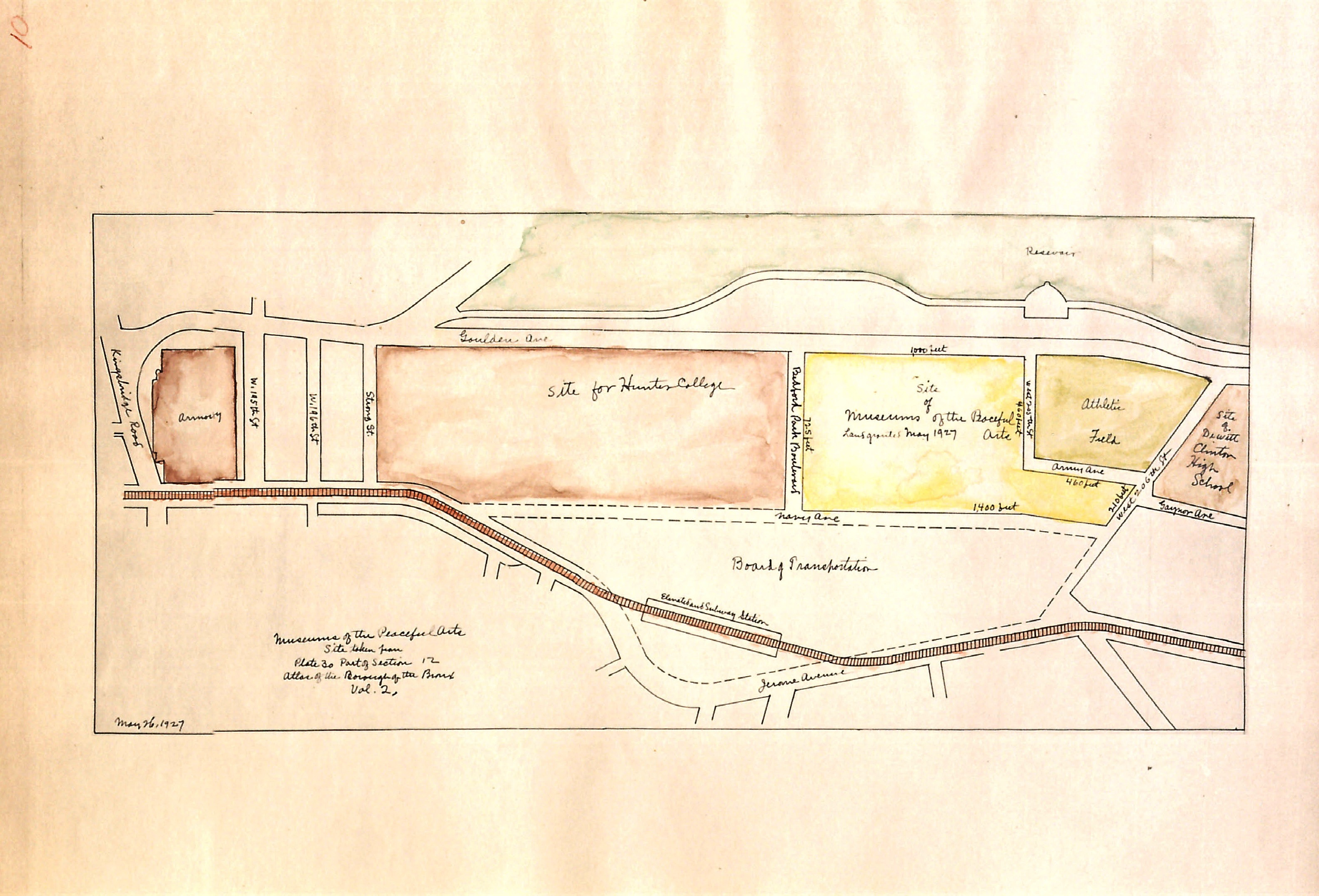
Eastern half of Jerome Park with a proposed Museum of the Peaceful Arts, 1927

The land that formed the western half of the Jerome Park Racetrack was turned into the Jerome Park Reservoir. The eastern half of the land was later used for:

- Kingsbridge Armory
- Walton High School
- Lehman College
- The Bronx High School of Science
- Jerome Park – a park of the New York City Department of Parks and Recreation.
- DeWitt Clinton High School
- High School of American Studies
- Jerome Yard
- Concourse Yard
- High Pumping Station
- Harris Field – a park of the New York City Department of Parks and Recreation.
- Tracey Towers, and Scott Tower – residential buildings built over the Jerome Yard.

During the 1920s, the eastern half of the land was considered as a possible site for the Museum of the Peaceful Arts.

== Other defunct New York race tracks ==
- Aqueduct Racetrack
- Brighton Beach Race Course
- Fleetwood Park Racetrack
- Gravesend Race Track
- Jamaica Race Course
- Morris Park Racecourse
- Roosevelt Raceway
- Sheepshead Bay Race Track
- Union Course
