= Capot =

American-bred Thoroughbred racehorse

- Sire: Menow
- Grandsire: Pharamond
- Dam: Piquet
- Damsire: St. Germans
- Sex: Stallion
- Foaled: 1946
- Country: United States
- Colour: Brown
- Breeder: Greentree Stable
- Owner: Greentree Stable
- Trainer: John M. Gaver Sr.
- Record: 28: 12–4–7
- Earnings: $345,260

Major wins
- Champagne Stakes (1948); Pimlico Futurity (1948); Jerome Handicap (1949); Pimlico Special (1949); Sysonby Handicap (1949); Wilson Stakes (1950) Triple Crown Race wins: Preakness Stakes (1949); Belmont Stakes (1949)

Awards
- U.S. Champion 3-Yr-Old Colt (1949); DRF United States Horse of the Year (1949)

Honours
- Aiken Thoroughbred Racing Hall of Fame (1977)

Capot (1946–1974) was an American Thoroughbred racehorse sired by Menow out of the mare Piquet. Owned and bred by Greentree Stable, Capot was trained by John M. Gaver, Sr.

== Two-year-old season ==
Racing as a two-year-old, Capot won the Champagne Stakes and the Wakefield Stakes. He capped off the year with his best performance in the prestigious Pimlico Futurity.

== Three-year-old season ==
At age three, Capot entered the 1949 Kentucky Derby as a 13–1 longshot. Ridden by Ted Atkinson in all the American Triple Crown races, Capot broke from the gate well and was forwardly placed early. He charged to the front of the field on the backstretch and held on willingly but was unable to withstand the rush from winner Ponder. Easily the best of the rest, he finished second, 4 1/2 lengths in front of Palestinian.

Then, in the second jewel of the Triple Crown, Capot opened as the 2.5–1 second favorite in the field of ten in the $75,000 Preakness. In that race, all broke well, and Capot sprinted near the lead in second as he passed the stands for the first time. Going into Pimlico's famous clubhouse turn, he was steadied in close quarters but held his position. Just inside the furlong pole coming down the lane, Capot assumed control and drew clear under pressure to stave off the rally of Palestinian and win by a head. It was three more lengths back to Noble Impulse in third, as favorite Ponder finished fifth. Capot won the Belmont Stakes three weeks later. His performances earned him 1949's Three-Year-Old Male Champion honors. He was also named the 1949 Horse of the Year by the Daily Racing Form but lost the Turf and Sport Digest poll to Coaltown.

== Four-year-old season ==
At age four, Capot won major stakes races including the 1950 Pimlico Special Handicap at "Old Hilltop" in Baltimore, Maryland. He is one of only four horses to win both of Maryland's top races in the Preakness Stakes and the Pimlico Special. The others were Triple Crown winners: Citation, Assault and Whirlaway. Later that year, Capot also won the Wilson Stakes and finished third in the Fleetwing Handicap to winner Sheilas Reward who broke the track record for six furlongs.

== Breeding ==
Pedigree of Capot
Sire Menow bay 1935	Pharamond brown 1925	Phalaris	Polymelus
Sire Menow bay 1935	Pharamond brown 1925	Phalaris	Bromus
Sire Menow bay 1935	Pharamond brown 1925	Selene	Chaucer
Sire Menow bay 1935	Pharamond brown 1925	Selene	Serenissima
Sire Menow bay 1935	Alcibiades ch. 1927	Supremus	Ultimus
Sire Menow bay 1935	Alcibiades ch. 1927	Supremus	Mandy Hamilton
Sire Menow bay 1935	Alcibiades ch. 1927	Regal Roman	Roi Herode
Sire Menow bay 1935	Alcibiades ch. 1927	Regal Roman	Lady Cicero
Dam Piquet black 1937	St. Germans bay 1921	Swynford	John O'Gaunt
Dam Piquet black 1937	St. Germans bay 1921	Swynford	Canterbury Pilgrim
Dam Piquet black 1937	St. Germans bay 1921	Hamoaze	Torpoint
Dam Piquet black 1937	St. Germans bay 1921	Hamoaze	Maid of the Mist
Dam Piquet black 1937	Parry brown 1929	Peter Pan	Commando
Dam Piquet black 1937	Parry brown 1929	Peter Pan	Cinderella
Dam Piquet black 1937	Parry brown 1929	Fair Feint	Fair Play
Dam Piquet black 1937	Parry brown 1929	Fair Feint	Felicity
