= 1919 Belmont Stakes =

American horse race

51st Belmont Stakes
- Belmont Stakes
- Grade I stakes race
- Location: Belmont Park; Elmont, New York, U.S.
- Date: June 11, 1919
- Distance: 1 3/8 mi (11 furlongs; 2,213 m)
- Winning horse: Sir Barton
- Winning time: 2:17 2/5
- Jockey: Johnny Loftus
- Trainer: H. Guy Bedwell
- Owner: J. K. L. Ross
- Conditions: Fast
- Surface: Dirt

The 1919 Belmont Stakes was the 51st running of the Belmont Stakes. It was the 13th Belmont Stakes held at Belmont Park in Elmont, New York and was held on June 11, 1919. With a field of only three horses, heavily favored Sir Barton won the 1 3/8–mile race (11 f; 2.2 km) by 5 lengths over Sweep On.

By winning the Belmont, Sir Barton became the first horse to win the Kentucky Derby, the Preakness Stakes, and the Belmont Stakes -- a feat which would later become known as the "Triple Crown."

Sir Barton's time of 2:17.4 set an American record for 1 3/8–mile.

== Results ==
Finish	PP	Horse	Jockey	Trainer	Owner	Final odds	Earnings US$
1	1	Sir Barton	Johnny Loftus	H. Guy Bedwell	J. K. L. Ross	7–20	$11,950
2	3	Sweep On	Charles Fairbrother	William H. Karrick	William R. Coe	12–5	$1,500
3	2	Natural Bridge	Linus McAtee	William H. Karrick	William R. Coe	12–5	$750
