= 2007 Belmont Stakes =

American horse race

139th Belmont Stakes
- Belmont Stakes
- "The Test of the Champion"
- Location: Belmont Park; Elmont, New York, U.S.
- Date: June 9, 2007
- Distance: 1 1/2 mi (12 furlongs; 2,414 m)
- Winning horse: Rags to Riches
- Winning time: 2:28.74
- Final odds: 4.30 (to 1)
- Jockey: John R. Velazquez
- Trainer: Todd Pletcher
- Owner: Michael Tabor & Derrick Smith
- Conditions: Fast
- Surface: Dirt

The 2007 Belmont Stakes was the 139th running of the Belmont Stakes. The race was held on June 9, 2007. Rags to Riches won the race by a head over Curlin before a crowd of 46,870, becoming the first filly to win the Belmont since 1905 and to win a Triple Crown race since the 1988 Kentucky Derby.

Post	Horse	Win	Place	Show
7	Rags to Riches	10.60	4.40	3.20
3	Curlin		3.00	2.30
2	Tiago			3.70

== Full results ==
Finished	Post	Horse	Jockey	Trainer	Owner	Time / behind
1st	7	Rags to Riches	John Velazquez	Todd Pletcher	Michael Tabor & Derrick Smith	2:28.74
2nd	3	Curlin	Robby Albarado	Steve Asmussen	Stonestreet, Padua,& Midnight Cry Stables	Head
3rd	2	Tiago	Mike E. Smith	John Shirreffs	Jerry & Ann Moss	
4th	6	Hard Spun	Garrett K. Gomez	J. Larry Jones	Fox Hill Farms	
5th	4	C P West	Edgar Prado	Nick Zito	Robert LaPenta	
6th	1	Imawildandcrazyguy	Mark Guidry	Bill Kaplan	Lewis Pell & Michael Eigner	
7th	5	Slew's Tizzy	Rafael Bejarano	Greg Fox	Joseph LeCombe Stables	

== Belmont Stakes feature key prep races list ==
This list contains the current 2007 standings that leads to the Belmont Stakes race.

Date	Track	Race	Grade	Distance	Purse (US$)	Surface track	Winning horse	Winning jockey
January 1	Calder Race Course	Tropical Park Derby	3	1 1/8 Miles	$100,000	Turf	Soldier's Dancer	C. Velázquez
January 6	Aqueduct Racetrack	Count Fleet Stakes		1 Mile and 70 Yards	$70,865	Inner Track (Dirt)	Pink Viper	N. Arroyo Jr.
January 7	Gulfstream Park	Spectacular Bid Stakes		6 Furlongs	$80,000	Dirt	Buffalo Man	E. Castro
January 7	Santa Anita Park	San Miguel Stakes		6 Furlongs	$80,000	Dirt	E. Z. Warrior	D. Flores
January 13	Santa Anita Park	San Rafael Stakes	2	1 Mile	$150,000	Dirt	Notional	C. Nakatani
January 13	Fair Grounds Race Course	LeComte Stakes	3	1 Mile	$98,000	Dirt	Hard Spun	M. Pino
January 15	Aqueduct Racetrack	Jimmy Winkfield Stakes		6 Furlongs	$62,082	Inner Track (Dirt)	Bill Place	R. Dominguez
January 27	Gulfstream Park	Sunshine Million Dash Stakes		6 Furlongs	$250,000	Dirt	Storm in May	M. Cruz
January 27	Tampa Bay Downs	Pasco Stakes		7 Furlongs	$75,000	Dirt	Barkley Sound	E. Jurado
January 28	Golden Gate Fields	California Derby		1-1/16 Miles	$150,000	Dirt	Bwana Bull	D. Lopez
February 3	Gulfstream Park	Holy Bull Stakes	3	1 Mile	$150,000	Dirt	Nobiz Like Shobiz	C. Velázquez
February 3	Gulfstream Park	Swale Stakes	2	6 1/2 Furlongs	$150,000	Dirt	Adore the Gold	C. Velázquez
February 3	Santa Anita Park	Sham Stakes	3	1 1/8 Miles	$101,500	Dirt	Ravel	G. Gomez
February 3	Laurel Park	Miracle Wood Stakes		1 Mile	$50,900	Dirt	Crafty Bear	M. Pino
February 10	Fair Grounds Race Course	Risen Star Stakes	3	1-1/16 Miles	$300,000	Dirt	Notional	R. Albarado
February 10	Aqueduct Racetrack	Whirlaway Stakes		1-1/16 Miles	$70,070	Inner Track (Dirt)	Summer Doldrums	M. Luzzi
February 10	Turfway Park	WEBN Stakes		1 Mile	$50,000	Dirt	Joe Got Even	M. Mena
February 11	Santa Anita Park	San Vicente Stakes	2	7 Furlongs	$150,000	Dirt	Noble Court	C. Nakatani
February 17	Tampa Bay Downs	Sam F. Davis Stakes		1-1/16 Miles	$150,000	Dirt	Any Given Saturday	J. Velázquez
February 17	Turf Paradise	Turf Paradise Derby		1-1/16 Miles	$100,000	Dirt	Tie Rod	J. Rivera
February 19	Oaklawn Park	Southwest Stakes		1 Mile	$250,000	Dirt	Teuflesberg	S. Elliott
February 19	Aqueduct Racetrack	Fred Caposella Stakes		6 Furlongs	$65,000	Dirt	Wollaston Bay	Shawn Bridgmohan
February 24	Gulfstream Park	Hallandale Beach Stakes		1-1/16 Miles	$100,000	Turf	Twilight Meteor	Edgar Prado
February 24	Oaklawn Park	Mountain Valley Stakes		6 Furlongs	$50,000	Dirt	Sir Five Star	J. Shepherd
March 3	Gulfstream Park	Fountain of Youth Stakes	2	1 1/8 Miles	$350,000	Dirt	Scat Daddy	John Velázquez
March 3	Gulfstream Park	Hutchesson Stakes	2	7 1/2 Furlongs	$150,000	Dirt	King of the Roxy	Edgar Prado
March 3	Santa Anita Park	Robert B. Lewis Stakes	2	1-1/16 Miles	$200,000	Dirt	Great Hunter	Corey Nakatani
March 3	Turfway Park	John Battaglia Memorial Stakes		1-1/16 Miles	$200,000	Dirt	Catman Running	W. Martinez
March 10	Aqueduct Racetrack	The Gotham Stakes	3	1-1/16 Miles	$200,000	Dirt	Cowtown Cat	R. Dominguez
March 10	Fair Grounds Race Course	Louisiana Derby	2	1-1/16 Miles	$594,000	Dirt	Circular Quay	John Velázquez
March 10	Bay Meadows	El Camino Real Stakes	3	1-1/16 Miles	$200,000	Dirt	Bwana Bull	Russell Baze
March 16	Santa Anita Park	Pasadena Stakes		1 Mile	$75,000	Turf	Whatsthescript (IRE)	I. Enriquez
March 17	Oaklawn Park	The Rebel Stakes	3	1-1/16 Miles	$300,000	Dirt	Curlin	Robby Albarado
March 17	Santa Anita Derby	San Felipe Stakes	2	1-1/16 Miles	$250,000	Dirt	Cobalt Blue	Victor Espinoza
March 17	Tampa Bay Downs	Tampa Bay Derby	3	1-1/16 Miles	$300,000	Dirt	Street Sense	C. Borel
March 18	Sunland Park	Winstar Derby		1 1/8 Miles	$600,000	Dirt	Song of Navarone	Victor Espinoza
March 24	Turfway Park	Lane's End Stakes	2	1 1/8 Miles	$500,000	Dirt	Hard Spun	M. Pino
March 24	Turfway Park	Rushaway Stakes		1-1/16 Miles	$100,000	Dirt	Dominican	Rafeal Bejarano
March 24	Laurel Park	Private Terms Stakes		1 Mile	$100,000	Dirt	Etude	Luis Garcia
March 24	Gulfstream Park	Palm Beach Stakes	3	1 1/8 Miles	$150,000	Turf	Duveen	Mark Guidry
March 31	Gulfstream Park	Florida Derby	1	1 1/8 Miles	$1,000,000	Dirt	Scat Daddy	Edgar Prado
March 31	Gulfstream Park	Aventura Stakes		7 Furlongs	$175,000	Dirt	Street Magician	Rafael Bejarano
April 7	Aqueduct Racetrack	Wood Memorial Stakes	1	1 1/8 Miles	$750,000	Dirt	Nobiz Like Shobiz	Cornelio Velázquez
April 7	Aqueduct Racetrack	Bay Shore Stakes	3	7 Furlongs	$150,000	Dirt	Bill Place	Cornelio Velázquez
April 7	Santa Anita Park	Santa Anita Derby	1	1 1/8 Miles	$750,000	Dirt	Tiago	Mike Smith
April 7	Hawthorne Race Course	Illinois Derby	2	1 1/8 Miles	$500,000	Dirt	Cowtown Cat	Fernando Jara
April 14	Keeneland Race Course	Blue Grass Stakes	1	1 1/8 Miles	$750,000	Dirt	Dominican	Rafeal Bejarano
April 14	Oaklawn Park	Northern Spur Breeders' Cup Stakes		1 Mile	$100,000	Dirt	Takedown	Robby Albarado
April 14	Oaklawn Park	Arkansas Derby	2	1 1/8 Miles	$1,000,000	Dirt	Curlin	Robby Albarado
April 14	Santa Anita Park	La Puente Stakes		1 Mile	$100,000	Turf	Golden Balls	Brice Blanc
April 21	Keeneland Race Course	Lexington Stakes	2	1-1/16 Miles	$325,000	Dirt	Slew's Tizzy	Robby Albarado
April 21	Pimlico Race Course	Federico Tesio Stakes		1 1/8 Miles	$125,000	Dirt	Xchanger	Ramon A. Dominguez
April 28	Churchill Downs	Derby Trial Stakes		7 1/2 Furlongs	$100,000	Dirt	Flying First Class	Mark Guidry
April 28	Aqueduct Racetrack	Withers Stakes	3	1 Mile	$150,000	Dirt	Divine Park	Alan Garcia
May 5	Churchill Downs	Kentucky Derby	1	1 1/4 miles	$11.80	Dirt	Street Sense	Calvin Borel
May 19	Pimlico Race Course	Preakness Stakes	1	1 3/16 Miles	?	Dirt	Curlin	Robby Albarado
