= Spinaway =

American Thoroughbred racehorse

- Sire: Leamington
- Grandsire: Faugh-a-Ballagh
- Dam: Megara
- Damsire: Eclipse
- Sex: Mare
- Foaled: 1878
- Country: United States
- Colour: Chestnut
- Breeder: Aristides Welch
- Owner: George L. Lorillard
- Trainer: R. Wyndham Walden
- Record: 9: 7-2-0

Major wins
- Bouquet Stakes (1880); Chestnut Hill Stakes (1880); Foam Stakes (1880); July Stakes (1880); Juvenile Stakes (1880); Surf Stakes (1880); Hopeful Stakes (Monmouth Park) (1880)

Awards
- American Champion Two-Year-Old Filly (1880)

Honors
- Spinaway Stakes at Saratoga Race Course

Spinaway (foaled 1878 at Erdenheim Stud Farm near Chestnut Hill near Philadelphia, Pennsylvania) was an American Thoroughbred filly for whom the Grade 1 Spinaway Stakes at Saratoga Race Course is named.

== Breeding ==
=== Male line ===
Bred by Aristides Welch, Spinaway's sire was Leamington, a multiple top-class stakes winner in England and a Leading sire in North America four times.

Leamington was also the sire of:

- Longfellow (1867) - brilliant runner, very successful sire, and U. S. Hall of Fame inductee;
- Aristides (1872) - won the first Kentucky Derby;
- Olitipa (1872) - Thoroughbred Heritage retrospective American Champion Two-Year-Old Filly and American Champion Three-Year-Old Filly;
- Parole (1873) - an 1870s top stakes and U. S. Hall of Fame inductee;
- Faithless (1873) - Thoroughbred Heritage retrospective American Champion Two-Year-Old Filly;
- Susquehanna (1874) - Thoroughbred Heritage retrospective American Champion Three-Year-Old Filly.
- Harold (1876) - Thoroughbred Heritage retrospective as the American Champion Two-Year-Old Colt and at three, won the Preakness Stakes;
- Rosalie (1877) - Thoroughbred Heritage retrospective American Champion Two-Year-Old Filly;
- Sensation (1877) - Thoroughbred Heritage retrospective American Champion Two-Year-Old Colt;
- Iroquois (1878) the first American horse to win England's Epsom Derby and St. Leger Stakes
- Saunterer (1878) - won 1878 Preakness and Belmont Stakes;
- Onondaga (1879) - Thoroughbred Heritage retrospective American Champion Two-Year-Old Colt.

Leamington was a son of Faugh-a-Ballagh who in 1844 became the first Irish-bred horse to win the British Classic Race, the St. Leger Stakes. At stud in France, Faugh-a-Ballagh sired Epsom and French Oaks winner Fille de l'Air whose race named in her honor has, through 2018, been run for more than 116 years.

=== Female line ===
Spinaway's dam was Megara who was bred by John Hunter, a founder of Saratoga Race Course and the first person to serve as chairman of The Jockey Club. Spinaway was by far the best of her foals.

Megara's dam, Ulrica, was the dam of Ben Ali who won the 1886 Kentucky Derby. Ulrica also produced Memento (1879) who won the first edition of the Spinaway Stakes in 1881.

Megara's good sire was Eclipse (1855) who also sired:

- Ruthless (1864) - U.S. Hall of Fame inductee won Belmont Stakes, Travers Stakes
- Remorseless (1867) - Thoroughbred Heritage retrospective U.S. Champion 2yo filly
- Alarm (1869) - sire of Himyar, Panique, Danger, Ann Fief, Fidele.
- Regardless (1871) At 2: Won: Flash Stakes --- At 3: Won: Alabama Stakes (NSR), Monmouth Oaks

== Racing career ==
Future Hall of Fame inductee Wyndham Walden trained Spinaway for owner George Lorillard. Her career was basically limited to her two-year-old season of 1880 when she was not just the dominant filly that year but also beat her male counterparts in every one of her seven stakes wins. Following its creation in 1997, Thoroughbred Heritage staff did a retrospective titled Champions of the Turf and selected Spinaway as the 1880 American Champion Two-Year-Old Female.

In a profile of Spinaway by Wallace's Monthly covering the year of 1880, they referred to a Spirit of the Times report on Spinaway's ability by their columnist known as "Albion" who had witnessed her win a maiden race at Jerome Park and the July Stakes at Monmouth Park. "Albion" wrote: "I have been a turf attendant for some years, and have seen a number of races and fine finishes, but I have never seen a horse finish like this filly."

A hoof injury led to Spinaway's retirement at age three.

== Broodmare ==
Owner George Lorillard died in 1886 and Spinaway became the property of his brother Pierre. By 1889 Spinaway had been sold to Milton Young, the owner of the important breeding operation, McGrathiana Stud. She would be sold again to Norman Kittson who in 1882 had purchased Erdenheim Stud Farm from Aristides Welch.

From eleven foals, Spinaway produced two good runners. The colt Lazzarone (1891), who won the Latonia Derby and Suburban Handicap, and a filly Handspun (1892) whose wins included the Kentucky Stakes, Willow Handicap and Tennessee Oaks.

Bred to Hanover, Spinaway foaled Handspun who in turn was the dam of the great racing filly Tanya, winner of the 1905 Belmont Stakes.

== Pedigree ==
Pedigree of Spinaway, chestnut filly, 1878
Sire Leamington	Faugh-a-Ballagh	Sir Hercules	Whalebone
Sire Leamington	Faugh-a-Ballagh	Sir Hercules	Peri
Sire Leamington	Faugh-a-Ballagh	Guiccioli	Bob Booty
Sire Leamington	Faugh-a-Ballagh	Guiccioli	Flight
Sire Leamington	Pantaloon mare	Pantaloon	Castrel
Sire Leamington	Pantaloon mare	Pantaloon	Idalia
Sire Leamington	Pantaloon mare	Daphne	Laurel
Sire Leamington	Pantaloon mare	Daphne	Maid of Honor
Dam Megara	Eclipse	Orlando	Touchstone
Dam Megara	Eclipse	Orlando	Vulture
Dam Megara	Eclipse	Gaze	Bay Middleton
Dam Megara	Eclipse	Gaze	Flycatcher
Dam Megara	Ulrica	Lexington	Boston
Dam Megara	Ulrica	Lexington	Alice Carneal
Dam Megara	Ulrica	Emilia	Young Emilius
Dam Megara	Ulrica	Emilia	Persian (family: 11)
