= 1875 in sports =

1875 in sports describes the year's events in world sport.

== American football ==
College championship

- College football national championship – Harvard Crimson

Events

- 13 November — first edition of "The Game", the annual contest between Yale Bulldogs and Harvard Crimson, is played under a modified set of rugby football rules known as "The Concessionary Rules". Yale loses 4–0, but finds that it prefers Harvard's adopted rugby style game.

== Association football ==
England

- FA Cup final – Royal Engineers 2–0 Old Etonians in a replay following a 1–1 draw (both games played at The Oval).
- 5 November — Blackburn Rovers founded at a meeting of enthusiasts in the St Leger Hotel, King William St, Blackburn.
- Birmingham City founded as Small Heath Alliance by cricketers from Holy Trinity Church in the Bordesley Green area of Birmingham.
- Introduction of crossbars.
- Wing play develops and the practice of "middling" (i.e., crossing) the ball is found to be effective. Heading is also introduced, apparently by players in Sheffield. Billy Mosforth of Sheffield FC is noted for his "screw shot" which gives him the ability to "bend" the ball in flight.

Scotland

- Scottish Cup final – Queen's Park 3–0 Renton at Hampden Park
- Hibernian FC founded in Edinburgh by Irish immigrants who give the club the Roman name for Ireland.

Australia

- A match is played between the inmates and staff of Woogaroo Lunatic Asylum and a visiting Australian Rules club. The rules used in the match state that the ball cannot be carried or handled.

== Baseball ==
National championship

- National Association of Professional Base Ball Players champion – Boston Red Stockings (fourth consecutive season)

== Boxing ==
Events

- No major bouts take place in 1875. Tom Allen retains the American Championship.

== Cricket ==
Events

- 18 August — formation of Somerset County Cricket Club by a team of amateurs at a meeting in Sidmouth, Devonshire, immediately after a match against a local side.

England

- Champion County – Nottinghamshire
- Most runs – W. G. Grace 1,498 @ 32.56 (HS 152)
- Most wickets – W. G. Grace 191 @ 12.94 (BB 9–48)

== Golf ==
Major tournaments

- British Open – Willie Park senior

== Horse racing ==
Events

- Inaugural running of the Kentucky Derby is won by Aristides

England

- Grand National – Pathfinder
- 1,000 Guineas Stakes – Spinaway
- 2,000 Guineas Stakes – Camballo
- The Derby – Galopin
- The Oaks – Spinaway
- St. Leger Stakes – Craig Millar

Australia

- Melbourne Cup – Wollomai

Canada

- Queen's Plate – Young Trumpeter

Ireland

- Irish Grand National – Scots Grey
- Irish Derby Stakes – Innishowen

USA

- Kentucky Derby – Aristides
- Preakness Stakes – Tom Ochiltree
- Belmont Stakes – Calvin

== Ice hockey ==
Events

- 3 March — first organised and recorded indoor game of ice hockey is played at the Victoria Skating Rink in Montreal.

== Rowing ==
The Boat Race

- 20 March — Oxford wins the 32nd Oxford and Cambridge Boat Race

== Rugby football ==
Events

- Barrow RLFC and Leinster Rugby are established in 1875
