= Calvin (horse) =

19th-century American Thoroughbred racehorse

- Sire: Tipperary
- Grandsire: Ringgold
- Dam: Lucy Fowler
- Damsire: Albion
- Sex: Stallion
- Foaled: 1872
- Country: United States
- Colour: Brown
- Breeder: H. Price McGrath
- Owner: H. Price McGrath
- Trainer: Ansel Williamson

Major wins
- July Stakes (1874); Jersey Derby (1875) American Classics wins: Belmont Stakes (1875)
- Last updated on 2019-10-08

Calvin (1872–1879) was an American Thoroughbred racehorse, winner of the 1875 Belmont Stakes. Besides the Belmont, Calvin won two other stakes races as a two and three year old horse. He was euthanized in 1879 after contracting tetanus.

== Background ==
Calvin was foaled in 1872, and was a brown stallion sired by Tipperary. He was bred by Price McGrath. Tipperary was sired by Ringgold and his dam was Roxana by the imported stallion Chesterfield. Calvin's dam was Lucy Fowler, who was sired by imported Albion. Lucy's dam was an unnamed mare sired by imported Leviathan. Calvin was a full brother to the stakes winner Aaron Pennington, who was foaled in 1871. Lucy was also the dam of the stakes winning Tom Bowling, who was sired by Lexington and was foaled in 1870.

== Racing career ==
As a two-year-old, Calvin won the 1874 July Stakes.

During his three-year-old year, Calvin won the ninth running of the Belmont Stakes in 1875 at Jerome Park Racetrack in a time of 2 minutes 40 1/4 seconds. He carried 110 pounds (50 kilograms) pounds in the race, and won $4,450 (equivalent to $127,000 in 2024) for his owner. The race was run on June 12 over a distance of 1 1/2 miles (12 furlongs (2,400 meters)) on a fast track. Calvin did not lead from the start, but instead came from behind to have a six-length lead at one point before fading a bit before the finish. Calvin won by two lengths from the second-placed finisher Aristides; the third place went to Milner. Both Calvin and Aristides were owned by H. Price McGarth. Calvin's trainer was U.S. Racing Hall of Fame Ansel Williams. The winning jockey was Robert Swim.

Besides his win in the Belmont, Calvin also won the 1875 Jersey Derby, where he beat future Hall of Fame horse Tom Ochiltree again, who was unplaced in the Belmont behind Calvin.

== Death ==
Calvin contracted tetanus in April 1879 from a nail penetrating his hoof and had to be euthanized. Calvin sired no stakes winners.
