= Sir Hercules =

Irish-bred Thoroughbred racehorse

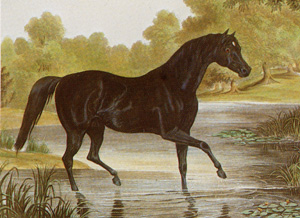
- Sire: Whalebone
- Grandsire: Waxy
- Dam: Peri
- Damsire: Wanderer
- Sex: Stallion
- Foaled: 1826
- Died: 1855 (aged 28–29)
- Country: Ireland
- Colour: Black
- Breeder: Mr. Lang
- Owner: Hercules Landford Rowley

Major wins
- Claret Stakes (1830)
- Last updated on 5 September 2009

Sir Hercules (1826–1855) was an Irish-bred Thoroughbred racehorse, and was later a successful sire.

== Pedigree ==
Sir Hercules was by the great sire Whalebone, winner of The Derby, out of Peri (1822) by Wanderer. Peri was bred to Whalebone at the age of three and Sir Hercules, her first foal, was born in 1826 at Petworth Stud. Sir Hercules was a half brother to Langford (by Starch) who was exported as a stallion to America.

Black with white ticking, Sir Hercules was 15 hands 2 inches high, and had a compact build, with identical length "...From the centre of the breast to the hind part of the shoulder, from hind part of shoulder to the hip, and from hip to whirl-bone," with "no more than room for a saddle on his back."

== Race record ==
=== As a two-year-old: 1828 ===
- Undefeated in Ireland where he won one race and a match race.

=== As a three-year-old: 1829 ===
Sir Hercules was taken to England where he won a Sweepstakes at York on 7 May. In September at Doncaster he finished third to Rowton and Voltaire in the St Leger and won a sweepstakes over one mile three days later.

=== As a four-year-old: 1830 ===
- won the Claret Stakes which appears to have been his only start that season.

=== As a five-year-old: 1831 ===
He was unplaced in Liverpool's Stand Cup which was his last start.

== Stud record ==
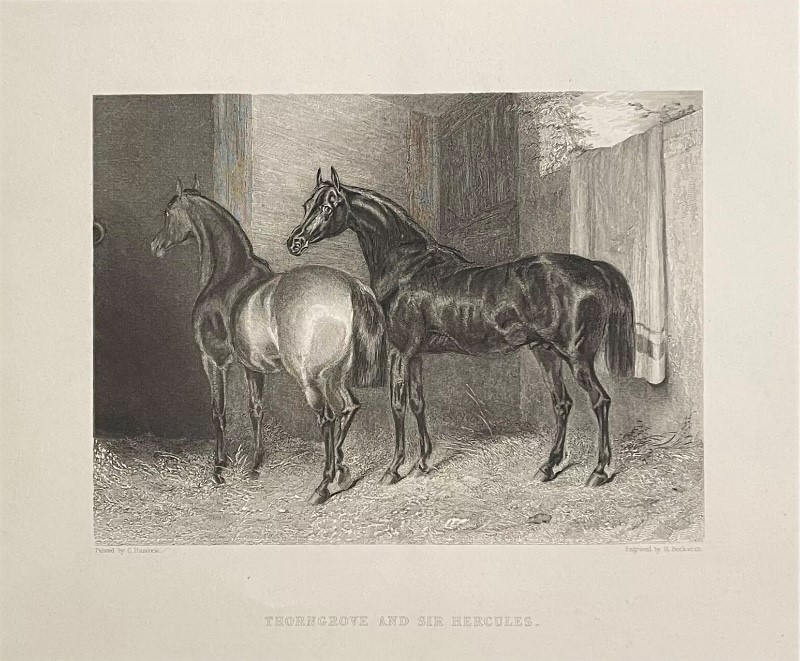
Thorngrove (left) and Sir Hercules (right) in their stable, painted by Charles Hancock and engraved in 1838 by Henry S. Beckwith.

Sir Hercules was purchased by Hercules Landford Rowley, the second Baron Langford of Summerhill in 1831 and was retired to Langford stud at Summer Hill in County Meath, Ireland. Initially he stood for a fee of £10 (equivalent to £900 in 2025). However, few Englishmen wished to breed their mares to him, and the young stallion was moved in 1832 to Rossmore Lodge at the Curragh. Sir Hercules was then sent to England in 1833 with the rest of Rowley's racing stud to be auctioned at Tattersalls. He was sold to America for 750 guineas, but it was decided that it was too late in the season to ship him overseas, and the stallion was resold to H.O. Weatherby.

Weatherby sent him to stand at stud at George Tattersall's stud, Dawley Wall Farm. In 1838, he was sent to East Acton, where he stood for a fee of £30 (equivalent to £2,880 in 2025). However, Weatherby died and Sir Hercules was sold to Sydney Herbert (later Lord Lea). In 1844, Herbert sent the stallion to Tattersall's Willesden Paddocks, where he was available to public mares. Soon, however, Herbert broke up his stud and sold Sir Hercules to Mr. Phillips of Bushbury Stud, where the stallion eventually died at the age of thirty.

Sir Hercules was influential in siring both flat and steeplechase race horses, including one winner of the Grand National. Both his sons and daughters had a profound impact on the bloodlines of horses in Australia, England, Ireland, the United States, and France.

Notable progeny include:

- Birdcatcher, his most famous son
- Coronation: won The Derby Stakes and Ascot Derby
- Faugh-a-Ballagh, won St. Leger Stakes, Grand Duke Michael Stakes, and Cesarewitch Stakes
- Gaslight (1850) exported to Australia and produced four stakes-winners for 16 stakes-wins.
- Gemma di Vergy (1854) won the Fernhill Stakes, the Reading Stakes, the Avon Stakes, the Nursery Handicap, the Whittlebury Stakes and the Racing Stakes, sire of Gemma-di-Vergy (1863) who was exported in utero to Australia where he was a sire.
- Hyllus, won Goodwood Cup* Paraguay, exported to Australia, dam of Sir Hercules (1843 by Cap-a-Pie, a good sire) and Whalebone (1844, another good sire)
- Lady Lift (1844), dam of Consul (won FR Two Thousand Guineas and FR Prix du Jockey Club) and Le Marechal (won GB Gimcrack Stakes)
- The Corsair, won Two Thousand Guineas
- Venus (1840), dam of Aphrodite (won GB One Thousand Guineas)

== Sire line tree ==
Descendants of Sir Hercules (click to show)
- Sir Hercules
  - Arthur
  - Birdcatcher
    - Ballinkeele
    - Mickey Free
      - Fenian
      - Milesian
    - King Fisher
    - The Baron
      - Chief Baron Nicholson
      - Stockwell
        - St Albans
        - Thunderbolt
        - Asteroid
        - Ace Of Clubs
        - Citadel
        - The Marquis
        - Grimston
        - Blair Athol
        - Bothwell
        - Breadalbane
        - Broomielaw
        - Caterer
        - Knowsley
        - Lord Ronald
        - The Duke
        - Lord Lyon
        - Monarch Of The Glen
        - Savernake
        - Historian
        - Uncas
        - Rustic
        - Countryman
        - Belladrum
        - Doncaster
        - Gang Forward
      - Rataplan
        - Knutsford
        - Kettledrum
        - Rapparee
        - The Miner
        - Elland
        - Blinkhoolie
        - The Drummer
        - Dalnacardoch
        - Drummond
        - Ben Battle
        - Austerlitz
      - Remunerateur
      - Isolier
      - Fort-a-Bras
      - Tonnerre des Indes
      - Zouave
        - Glaieul
        - Tiralleur
        - Avant Garde
        - Enfant de Troupe
      - Costa
      - Baronella
    - Bryan O'Linn
    - Caurouch
    - Chanticleer
      - Vengeance
      - Cock Robin
    - Marquis
      - Blood Royal
    - Rory O'More
    - Augur
    - Daniel O'Rourke
      - Sledmere
        - Daniel O'Rourke
      - Dalby
      - Ladykirk
        - Haricot
    - Womersley
      - Amati
      - Black Tommy
      - Condrington
      - General Willams
        - Holderness
      - St Giles
        - Giles The First
        - Wild Huntsman
      - Marignon
        - Le Petit Caporal
      - Provacateur
    - Lord Fauconberg
      - Royal Oak Day
      - Rama
    - Bandy
    - Gamekeeper
    - Grey Plover
      - Sir Robert Peel
      - Golden Plover
    - Knight Of St George
      - Dan O'Connell
        - The Liberator
      - Knight Of St Patrick
        - Moslem
      - Melbourne Jr
        - Bazil
        - Incommode
        - Malvern
      - Knighthood
    - Papageno
      - Master George
    - Warlock
      - Vaucresson
      - War
      - Tynedale
        - Border Minstrel
        - Riversdale
    - Saunterer
      - Digby Grand
        - Tartar
      - Saunterer
      - Regal
    - Red Eagle
    - Oxford
      - The Student
      - Oxonian
      - Blenheim
      - Sterling
        - Isonomy
        - Sterlingworth
        - Beaudesert
        - Discount
        - Fernandez
        - Geologist
        - Play Actor
        - Energy
        - Keir
        - The Golden Farmer
        - Harvester
        - Esterling
        - Metal
        - Paradox
        - Atheling
        - Doubloon
        - Silver
        - Stalwart
        - Cherry Ripe
        - Enterprise
        - Top Gallant
        - Loyalist
        - Enthusiast
        - Gold
        - Endurance
        - Paderewski
        - Encounter
        - Kingsley
      - Wilberforce
      - Nuneham
      - Playfair
      - Chandos
      - Standard
        - Hambledon
  - The Hydra
    - Chief Justice
    - Mark Tapely
  - Hyllus
  - The Corsair
  - Coronation
  - Robert de Gorham
    - Sir Colin
  - Newcourt
    - Cotswold
  - Faugh-a-Ballagh
    - Goldfinder
    - Le Juif
    - Ethelwolf
    - Father Thames
    - Lucio
    - Morning Star
    - Ethelbert
      - Big Ben
      - King Of Kent
        - Pagnini
      - Adalbert
    - Barrel
    - Fearless
    - Knight Of The Garter
    - Leamington
      - Enquirer
        - Falsetto
        - Emperor
        - Inspector B
      - Longfellow
        - Leonard
        - Longtaw
        - Passaic
        - Freeland
        - Leonatus
        - The Bard
        - Long Dance
        - Longstreet
        - Riley
        - Wadsworth
      - Lynchburg
      - Lyttleton
      - Eolus
        - Eole
        - Knight of Ellerslie
        - St Saviour
        - Morello
      - Reform
        - Azra
      - Aristides
      - Hyder Ali
        - Spokane
      - James A
      - Rhadamanthus
      - Parole
      - Stratford
        - Foxford
      - Harold
      - Sensation
        - Refund
        - Jean Beraud
        - Donnie
        - Democrat
      - Iroquois
        - Cayuga
      - Huron
        - Tammany
        - G W Johnson
      - Saunterer
      - Onandaga
      - Powhattan
        - Burlington
    - The Brewer
    - Master Bagot
      - Lottery
    - The Hadji
      - Terror
    - Ben Brace
    - Blackthorn
    - Knight Of The Blaze
    - Garibaldi
    - Pretendant
    - L'Africain
    - Armagnac
    - Jarnicoton
  - Discount
  - Hagley
  - Hartneitstein
  - Hotspur
  - Landgrave
  - Knight Of The Shire
  - Gemma di Vergy
    - Lucifer
      - Don Juan
    - Rococo
      - Old Buck
        - Grudon
  - Gunboat
    - Torpedo
  - Lifeboat
    - The Mariner
      - Jolly Tar
        - Jack Tar
          - Cabin Boy
  - Sir Hercules
