= 1875 Kentucky Derby =

Horse race

1st Kentucky Derby
- Kentucky Derby
- Grade I stakes race
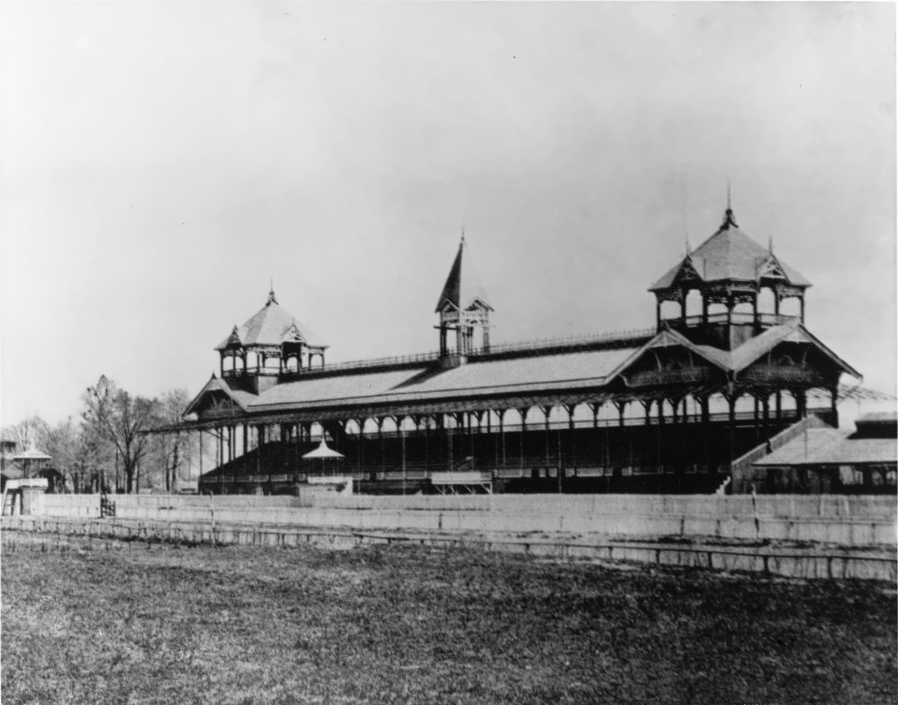
- Grandstands of the Louisville Jockey Club grounds, 1875
- Location: Churchill Downs
- Date: May 17, 1875
- Winning horse: Aristides
- Jockey: Oliver Lewis
- Trainer: Ansel Williamson
- Owner: H. Price McGrath
- Surface: Dirt

The 1875 Kentucky Derby was the first running of the annually recurring race, taking place on May 17, 1875. It took place on the Louisville Jockey Club Grounds as a 1.5-mile run. The track was not called Churchill Downs until 1884 and the traditional distance of 1.25 miles was not established until 1896. That first Derby was a 1.5-mile race, and the traditional distance of 1.25 miles was not established until the 1896 Derby. For the first several years the betting format at this race was as auction pools in which people bid for the right to bet on the horse and the highest bidder then placed his bet. The bettor who picked the winning horse won the whole pot. Thirteen of the fifteen jockeys in the race, including winner Oliver Lewis, were African-American. Attendance was estimated at 10,000.

The winner was Aristides, by two lengths. Ansel Williamson trained him and H. Price McGrath. Aristides' half-brother and stablemate Chesapeake also ran in the race. Both Aristides' jockey and trainer were black. Aristides's time of 2 minutes and 37.75 seconds was at the time a world record for the distance.

== Full results ==
Finished	Post	Horse	Jockey	Trainer	Owner	Time / behind
1st	1	Aristides	Oliver Lewis	Ansel Williamson	H. Price McGrath	2:37.75
2nd		Volcano	H. Williams		George H. Rice	
3rd		Verdigris	W. Chambers		C. A. Lewis	
4th		Bob Woolley	William Walker		Robinson, Morgan & Co.	
5th		Ten Broeck	M. Kelso	Harry Colston	Frank B. Harper	
6th		Grenoble	J. Carter		Allen Bashford	
7th		Bill Bruce	M. Jones		S. J. Salyer	
8th		Chesapeake	W. Henry		H. Price McGrath	
9th		Searcher	Raleigh Colston Jr.		J. B. Rodes	
10th		Ascension	William Lakeland		William Cottrill	
11th		Enlister	Cyrus Holloway		Stringfield & Clay	
12th		McCreery	D. Jones		Gen. Abe Buford	
13th		Warsaw	Masterson		Stringfield & Clay	
14th		Vagabond	J. Houston		A.B. Lewis & Co.	
15th		Gold Mine	Stradford		James A. Grinstead	

== Payout ==
The winner received a purse of $2,850. The second-place finisher received $200.
