= Jerome Stakes =

- Class: Non-Graded Stakes
- Location: Aqueduct Racetrack; Queens, New York, United States
- Inaugurated: 1866
- Race type: Thoroughbred – Flat racing
- Website: www.nyra.com

Race information
- Distance: 1 mile
- Surface: Dirt
- Track: left-handed
- Qualification: Three-year-olds
- Weight: Allowance
- Purse: US$150,000 (2021)

The Jerome Stakes is a stakes race for thoroughbred horses run each January at Aqueduct Racetrack. Open to three year olds, the race is run at one mile and carries a purse of $150,000. It is a Road to the Kentucky Derby qualifying race, with the winner receiving 10 points towards qualification for the Kentucky Derby.

The Jerome is the second oldest stakes race in the United States behind the Travers Stakes. It is named after Leonard W. Jerome, the grandfather of Winston Churchill and the founder of the old Jerome Park Racetrack in The Bronx.

Notable horses that have won the Jerome include inaugural Kentucky Derby winner Aristides in 1875, Fitz Herbert in 1909, Bold Ruler in 1957, Kelso in 1960, Carry Back in 1961 and Fusaichi Pegasus in 2000.

Up until 2009 the race was typically held in the fall at Belmont Park, after the major three-year-old classics. Following a hiatus in 2010, the Jerome was run for two years at the end of the Aqueduct Spring meet in April before moving to its current position in early January.

The Jerome was first run at Jerome Park from 1866 to 1889, then at Morris Park Racecourse until 1905, at Belmont Park from 1906 to 1959 and 1968 to 2009, and also at Aqueduct Racetrack in 1960, from 1962 to 1967 and from 2011 to the present. There was no race run from 1910 to 1913 and there were two divisions from 1866 to 1870. Since inception it has been contested at a variety of distances:

- 2 miles: 1871–1877
- 1 3/4 miles: 1878–1889
- 1 5/16 miles: 1890–1891, 1903
- 1 1/2 miles: 1892
- 1 1/4 miles: 1893–1894, 1896–1909
- 1 1/8 miles: 1895
- 1 mile, 70 yards: 2011–2017

== Records ==
Speed record: (at current distance of one mile)

- 1:33.20 – Noble Nashua (1981)

Most wins by a trainer:

- 5 – Sam Hildreth (1908, 1909, 1914, 1919, 1922)

Most wins by a jockey:

- 6 – Eddie Arcaro (1946, 1950, 1955, 1957, 1958, 1960)

Most wins by an owner:

- 4 – Harry Payne Whitney (1906, 1907, 1921, 1926)
- 4 – Joseph E. Widener (1927, 1930, 1933, 1940)

== Winners ==
Year	Winner	Jockey	Trainer	Owner	Time
2026	My World	Jaime Rodriguez	Brad H. Cox	LaPenta, Robert V. and Madaket Stables LLC	1:38.96
2025	Cyclone State	Luis R. Rivera Jr.	Chad Summers	Gold Square LLC, Messina, George and Lee, Michael	1:40.82
2024	Drum Roll Please	Javier Castellano	Brad H. Cox	Gold Square LLC	1:41.91
2023	Lugan Knight	Dylan Davis	Michael W. McCarthy	BG Stables (George Yager)	1:37.77
2022	Courvoisier	José Ortiz	Kelly Breen	Hill 'n' Dale Farms & James D. Spry	1:38.86
2021	Capo Kane	Dylan Davis	Harold Wyner	Leonard Liberto & Bing Cherry Racing LLC	1:38.02
2020	Independence Hall	José Ortiz	Michael J. Trombetta	Eclipse Thoroughbreds & Twin Creek Stables	1:37.27
2019	Mind Control	John Velazquez	Gregory D. Sacco	Red Oak Stable & Madaket Stables	1:39.06
2018	Firenze Fire	Manuel Franco	Jason Servis	Mr. Amore Stable	1:42.88
2017	El Areeb	Trevor McCarthy	Cathal A. Lynch	M M G Stables	1:46.17
2016	Flexibility	Irad Ortiz Jr.	Chad C. Brown	Klaravich Stables & William H. Lawrence	1:42.98
2015	El Kabeir	Charles C. Lopez	John P. Terranova II	Zayat Stables	1:44.69
2014	Noble Moon	Irad Ortiz Jr.	Leah Gyarmati	Treadway Racing Stable	1:45.08
2013	Vyjack	Cornelio Velásquez	Rudy R. Rodriguez	Pick Six Racing	1:40.67
2012	The Lumber Guy	Michael J. Luzzi	Michael E. Hushion	Barry K. Schwartz	1:36.04
2011	Adios Charlie	Rajiv Maragh	Stanley M. Hough	S. M. Hough & Robert Sahn	1:36.81
2010	no race				
2009	Girolamo	Alan Garcia	Saeed bin Suroor	Godolphin Racing	1:33.81
2008	Tale of Ekati	Cornelio Velásquez	Barclay Tagg	Charles E. Fipke	1:36.17
2007	Daaher	Mike Luzzi	Kiaran McLaughlin	Shadwell Racing	1:34.28
2006	Discreet Cat	Garrett Gomez	Saeed bin Suroor	Godolphin Racing	1:36.46
2005	Silver Train	Edgar Prado	Richard E. Dutrow Jr.	Buckram Oak Farm	1:34.24
2004	Teton Forest	Shaun Bridgmohan	Bob Baffert	B. Wayne Hughes	1:35.74
2003	During	José A. Santos	Bob Baffert	James McIngvale	1:36.32
2002	Boston Common	Jorge Chavez	Michael V. Pino	Richard Englander	1:36.12
2001	Express Tour	John Velazquez	Saeed bin Suroor	Godolphin Racing	1:34.57
2000	Fusaichi Pegasus	Kent Desormeaux	Neil D. Drysdale	Sekiguchi & Shadai	1:34.07
1999	Doneraile Court	Chris Antley	Nick Zito	Tabor & Magnier	1:35.63
1998	Limit Out	Jean-Luc Samyn	H. Allen Jerkens	Joseph V. Shields Jr.	1:36.22
1997	Richter Scale	Shane Sellers	Patrick B. Byrne	Nancy & Richard Kaster	1:35.88
1996	Why Change	Chuck C. Lopez	Joseph H. Pierce Jr.	Marvin Delfiner	1:34.22
1995	French Deputy	Gary Stevens	Neil D. Drysdale	Irving & Marjorie Cowan	1:33.53
1994	Prenup	Jerry Bailey	Mark A. Hennig	Edward P. Evans	1:34.59
1993	Schossberg	Jerry Bailey	Phil England	Steve Stavro	1:35.53
1992	Furiously	Jerry Bailey	Claude R. McGaughey III	Mill House Stable	1:34.20
1991	Scan	José A. Santos	Flint S. Schulhofer	William Haggin Perry	1:34.09
1990	Housebuster	Craig Perret	Warren A. Croll Jr.	Robert P. Levy	1:34.14
1989	De Roche	Dennis Carr	Thomas Bohannan	Loblolly Stable	1:34.56
1988	Evening Kris	Jerry Bailey	Philip Gleaves	Robert E. Brennan	1:37.80
1987	Afleet	Gary Stahlbaum	Phil England	Richard R. Kennedy	1:33.80
1986	Ogygian	Walter Guerra	Jan H. Nerud	Tartan Farms	1:34.00
1985	Creme Fraiche	Eddie Maple	Woody Stephens	Brushwood Stables	1:34.60
1984	Is Your Pleasure	Don MacBeth	Edward I. Kelly Sr.	Brookfield Farm	1:35.20
1983	A Phenomemon	Ángel Cordero Jr.	Angel Penna Jr.	Brownell Combs II	1:35.20
1982	Fit To Fight	Jerry Bailey	MacKenzie Miller	Rokeby Stables	1:35.40
1981	Noble Nashua	Cash Asmussen	Jose A. Martin	Flying Zee Stable	1:33.20
1980	Jaklin Klugman	Chris McCarron	LeRoy Jolley	Jack Klugman	1:34.20
1979	Czaravich	Jean Cruguet	William H. Turner Jr.	William L. Reynolds	1:35.20
1978	Sensitive Prince	Jacinto Vásquez	H. Allen Jerkens	Top the Marc Stable	1:36.00
1977	Broadway Forli †	Pat Day	Homer C. Pardue	Strapro Stable	1:36.20
1976	Dance Spell	Ruben Hernandez	James W. Maloney	Christiana Stables	1:35.00
1975	Guards Up	Carlos Lopez	Thomas H. Heard Jr.	Heardsdale	1:34.20
1974	Stonewalk	Ángel Cordero Jr.	Daniel J. Lopez	Timberland Stable	1:34.00
1973	Step Nicely	Ángel Cordero Jr.	H. Allen Jerkens	Hobeau Farm	1:34.00
1972	True Knight	Ángel Cordero Jr.	Lou Rondinello	Darby Dan Farm	1:36.60
1971	Tinajero	Eddie Belmonte	Laz Barrera	Rafael Escudero	1:35.80
1970	Great Mystery	Phil Grimm	Lynn S. Whiting	Dario Bacchiocchi	1:34.80
1969	Mr. Leader	Jorge Velásquez	MacKenzie Miller	Cragwood Stables	1:36.00
1968	Iron Ruler	Jorge Velásquez	Edward J. Yowell	October House Farm	1:35.20
1967	High Tribute	Laffit Pincay Jr.	Victor J. Nickerson	Elmendorf Farm	1:34.80
1966	Bold and Brave	Braulio Baeza	Edward A. Neloy	Wheatley Stable	1:38.00
1965	Bold Bidder	Eldon Nelson	Randy Sechrest	Paul Falkenstein	1:36.00
1964	Irvkup	John L. Rotz	Burley Parke	Harbor View Farm	1:35.00
1963	Chateaugay	Braulio Baeza	James P. Conway	Darby Dan Farm	1:36.00
1962	Black Beard	Braulio Baeza	James P. Conway	Darby Dan Farm	1:34.60
1961	Carry Back	Johnny Sellers	Jack A. Price	Katherine Price	1:36.00
1960	Kelso	Eddie Arcaro	Carl Hanford	Bohemia Stable	1:34.80
1959	Intentionally	Manuel Ycaza	Edward Kelly Sr.	Brookfield Farm	1:35.40
1958	Warhead	Eddie Arcaro	Kay Erik Jensen	Mabel D. Scholz	1:37.20
1957	Bold Ruler	Eddie Arcaro	James Fitzsimmons	Wheatley Stable	1:35.00
1956	Reneged	Angel Valenzuela	Homer C. Pardue	Woodley Lane Farm	1:35.40
1955	Traffic Judge	Eddie Arcaro	Woody Stephens	Clifford Mooers	1:35.20
1954	Martyr	Stanley Small	G. Carey Winfrey	Jan Burke	1:35.80
1953	Navy Page	Nick Shuk	Gordon J. McCann	E. P. Taylor	1:37.00
1952	Tom Fool	Ted Atkinson	John M. Gaver Sr.	Greentree Stable	1:37.00
1951	Alerted	Ovie Scurlock	Jimmy Penrod	Hampton Stable	1:36.20
1950	Hill Prince	Eddie Arcaro	Casey Hayes	Christopher Chenery	1:35.80
1949	Capot	Ted Atkinson	John M. Gaver Sr.	Greentree Stable	1:36.80
1948	Coaltown	Newbold Pierson	Horace A. Jones	Calumet Farm	1:36.00
1947	Donor	Job Dean Jessop	George P. Odom	W. Deering Howe	1:37.40
1946	Mahout	Eddie Arcaro	Oscar White	Sarah F. Jeffords	1:37.00
1945	Buzfuz	Tommy Luther	Joe Rosen	Sunshine Stable	1:37.20
1944	Occupy	Otto Grohs	Burley Parke	John Marsch	1:37.20
1943	Slide Rule	Jack Westrope	Cecil Wilhelm	William E. Boeing	1:37.00
1942	King's Abbey	Carroll Bierman	Graceton Philpot	Louis B. Mayer	1:36.40
1941	Stimady	Porter Roberts	Robert R. Tilden	Michael E. Ryan	1:37.20
1940	Roman	Wayne D. Wright	Daniel E. Stewart	Joseph E. Widener	1:37.20
1939	Easy Mon	Leon Haas	Ben A. Jones	Calumet Farm	1:35.80
1938	Cravat	Alfred Robertson	Walter Burrows	Townsend B. Martin	1:36.40
1937	Pasha	Lester Balaski	J. Thomas Taylor	Myron Selznick	1:38.20
1936	Goldeneye	Ira Hanford	A. A. Baroni	A. A. Baroni	1:36.60
1935	Good Harvest	Sam Renick	Bud Stotler	Alfred G. Vanderbilt II	1:36.20
1934	Kievex	Wayne D. Wright	J. J. Waldron	William Graham	1:37.00
1933	Golden Way	Mack Garner	Pete Coyne	Joseph E. Widener	1:38.60
1932	Larranaga	Raymond Workman	Edward J. Bennett	Anall Stable (Allan A. Ryan)	1:37.40
1931	Ironclad	Lester Pichon	Preston M. Burch	Walter M. Jeffords	1:37.00
1930	Mr. Sponge	Mack Garner	Henry McDaniel	Joseph E. Widener	1:37.40
1929	Soul of Honor	George Fields	Robert A. Smith	Audley Farm Stable	1:36.20
1928	Sun Edwin	Linus McAtee	Louis Feustel	Arden Farms	1:36.80
1927	Osmand	Earl Sande	G. Hamilton Keene	Joseph E. Widener	1:38.00
1926	Croyden	Linus McAtee	James G. Rowe Sr.	Harry Payne Whitney	1:38.00
1925	Primrose	John Maiben	Thomas J. Healey	Walter J. Salmon Sr.	1:38.60
1924	Priscilla Ruley	John Maiben	James Fitzsimmons	Belair Stud	1:37.80
1923	Cherry Pie	Frank Coltiletti	Scott Harlan	Greentree Stable	1:35.40
1922	Kai-Sang	Laverne Fator	Sam Hildreth	Rancocas Stable	1:37.00
1921	Tryster	Frank Coltiletti	James G. Rowe Sr.	Harry Payne Whitney	1:38.20
1920	Busy Signal	Clarence Kummer	William A. Hurley	Edward R. Bradley	1:37.60
1919	Thunderclap	Laverne Fator	Sam Hildreth	Sam Hildreth	1:39.40
1918	Sunny Slope	John Callahan	Not found	William Martin	1:38.40
1917	Bally	Lawrence Lyke	John H. McCormack	James Butler	1:38.00
1916	Spur	Johnny Loftus	John H. McCormack	James Butler	1:39.00
1915	Trial By Jury	Thomas McTaggart	J. Simon Healy	Edward B. Cassatt	1:38.40
1914	Stromboli	Clarence Turner	Sam Hildreth	August Belmont Jr.	1:36.60
1909	Fitz Herbert	Eddie Dugan	Sam Hildreth	Sam Hildreth	2:11.00
1908	Fair Play	Clifford Gilbert	Sam Hildreth	August Belmont Jr.	2:10.40
1907	Perseverance	D. R. "Puddin" McDaniel	John W. Rogers	Harry Payne Whitney	2:13.80
1906	Ironsides	Herman Radtke	John W. Rogers	Harry Payne Whitney	2:10.60
1905	Bedouin	Willie Shaw	John Huggins	E. W. Jewett	2:10.60
1904	Ostrich	William Crimmins	Frank Lightfoot	Boston Stable	2:13.00
1903	Eugenia Burch	Grover Fuller	W. P. Maxwell	Libby Curtis	2:15.00
1902	Hermis	Ted Rice	John H. McCormack	Louis V. Bell	2:06.20
1901	Blues	Willie Shaw	Frank D. Weir	Frank J. Farrell	2:05.75
1900	Alcedo	Patrick McCue	James H. McCormick	Patrick Dunne	2:07.00
1899	King Barleycorn	George M. Odom	Edward Heffner	J. P. Robinson	2:09.00
1898	Handball	Nash Turner	Frank McCabe	Philip J. Dwyer	2:06.00
1897	Rensselaer	E. Hewitt	Henry Harris	John E. McDonald	2:07.00
1896	Soufflé	Joe Hill	Jim M. Murphy	Jim M. Murphy	2:09.00
1895	Counter Tenor	Willie Simms	William Lakeland	Jacob Ruppert Jr.	1:54.00
1894	Rubicon	William Midgely	Henry Harris	John E. McDonald	2:09.75
1893	Young Arion	John Lamely	William Lakeland	Jacob Ruppert Jr.	2:08.75
1892	Tammany	Edward Garrison	Matthew Byrnes	Marcus Daly	2:36.25
1891	Picknicker	Alonzo Clayton	Louis Stuart	L. Stuart & Co.	2:22.60
1890	Tournament	William Hayward	Matthew M. Allen	George Hearst	2:16.00
1889	Longstreet	Isaac Burns Murphy	Hardy Campbell Jr.	L. Stuart & Co.	3:11.00
1888	Prince Royal	Edward Garrison	James G. Rowe Sr.	August Belmont	3:10.25
1887	Firenze	Edward Garrison	Matthew Byrnes	James B. A. Haggin	3:09.75
1886	The Bard	William Hayward	John Huggins	Alexander Cassatt	N/A
1885	Longview	William Fitzpatrick	Not found	Lamasney Bros.	3:20.00
1884	Water Lily	Matthew Feakes	Not found	Mr. Kelso	3:16.00
1883	George Kinney	William Fitzpatrick	James G. Rowe Sr.	Dwyer Brothers Stable	3:19.00
1882	Carley B.	Jim McLaughlin	James G. Rowe Sr.	Dwyer Brothers Stable	3:21.50
1881	Barrett	Matthew Feakes	Matthew Byrnes	Pierre Lorillard IV	3:13.00
1880	Grenada	Lloyd Hughes	R. Wyndham Walden	George L. Lorillard	3:12.60
1879	Monitor	Lloyd Hughes	R. Wyndham Walden	George L. Lorillard	3:12.00
1878	Duke of Magenta	Lloyd Hughes	R. Wyndham Walden	George L. Lorillard	3:11.50
1877	Bazil	George Evans	Jacob Pincus	Pierre Lorillard IV	3:43.00
1876	Charley Howard	W. Lakewood	David McDaniel	David McDaniel	3:47.75
1875	Aristides	Robert Swim	Ansel Williamson	H. Price McGrath	3:43.00
1874	Acrobat	John Sparling	Charles S. Lloyd	K. W. Sears	3:37.75
1873	Tom Bowling	Robert Swim	Ansel Williamson	H. Price McGrath	3:40.00
1872	Joe Daniels	James Rowe Sr.	David McDaniel	David McDaniel	3:40.25
1871	Harry Bassett	James Rowe Sr.	David McDaniel	David McDaniel	3:54.75
1870	Kingfisher	Burns	Raleigh Colston Sr.	Daniel Swigert	1:49.00
1869	Glenelg	Charles Miller	Jacob Pincus	August Belmont	1:48.50
1868	Bayonet	Charles Miller	T. G. Moore	T. G. Moore	1:45.25
1867	Metairie	Patsy Hennessey	Jacob Pincus	Robert Underwood	1:49.25
1866	Watson	Abe Hawkins	Jacob Pincus	Robert A. Alexander	1:48.75

* † In 1977, To The Quick finished first but was disqualified and placed second and Affiliate who finished second was disqualified and placed third.
