= Oliver Lewis =

American jockey

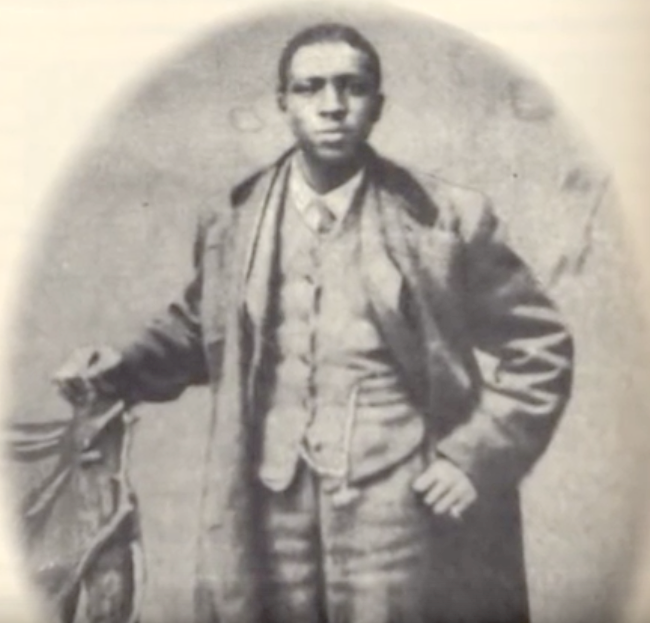
- Oliver Lewis, winning jockey of the first Kentucky Derby

Personal information
- Born: December 22, 1856 Versailles, Kentucky
- Died: January 30, 1924 (aged 67) Cincinnati, Ohio
- Resting place: African Cemetery No. 2 (Lexington, Kentucky)
- Occupation: Jockey
- Spouse: Lucy Wright (m. 1881)
- Children: 6

Horse racing career
- Sport: Horse racing

Major racing wins
- American Classics wins: Kentucky Derby (1875)

Honours
- Oliver Lewis Way, Lexington, Kentucky

Significant horses
- Aristides

Oliver Lewis (December 22, 1856 – January 30, 1924) was an American jockey in Thoroughbred horse racing. On May 17, 1875, Lewis won the very first Kentucky Derby aboard Aristides. The pair won by a reported two lengths, setting a new American record time for a mile-and-a-half race. Lewis and Aristides took second place in the Belmont Stakes, which is now the third race of the U.S. Triple Crown series.

== Early life ==
Oliver Lewis was born December 22, 1856, in Versailles, Kentucky, to his parents Goodson Lewis (1830–1880) and Elanora Keys Lewis (1837–1894). Lewis was born free and was the second of ten children. In the 1870s, his family moved from Woodford County, Kentucky, settling in Lexington, Kentucky.

== Career ==
Lewis was only 19 years old when he entered the first Kentucky Derby. The race was held at what was then the Louisville Jockey Club on May 17, 1875, but is now known as Churchill Downs. Ten thousand spectators watched this first race. Lewis rode a horse named Aristides, which was one of two colts entered by their owner, H. Price McGrath of Jessamine, Kentucky. The other horse, Chesapeake, was ridden by William Henry. Although the same owner entered both horses, Chesapeake was favored to win the $2,850 purse, and Lewis was told that his job was to lead most of the race to tire out the other horses. Out of the fifteen jockeys in the field, at this first Kentucky Derby, thirteen of them were African American. Aristides' trainer, Ansel Williamson, was also an African American.

Oliver Lewis followed his instructions and was pushing most of the field while trailing a horse named Volcano for most of the race. However, in the late stretch, Chesapeake was unexpectedly far back in the pack while Aristides and Volcano were running neck and neck for first place. Lewis and Aristides pulled away near the finish line and won the race by two lengths. With that victory, Lewis became the first jockey to win the Kentucky Derby, America's longest continuous sporting event. Later that season, Lewis came in second in the Belmont Stakes in New York and won three more races at the Louisville Jockey Club, riding Aristides in all of them. He would never ride in the Kentucky Derby again, however, and would retire after that racing season for unknown reasons.

== Post-career ==
After retiring from racing, Lewis worked for a short time as a day laborer, but then began providing handicapping tables and racing forms to bookies. He later became a bookie himself, which was legal in Kentucky at that time. He also worked as a teamster.

Shortly after 1900, Lewis moved his family from Lexington, Kentucky, to Cincinnati, Ohio, where he lived for the rest of his life, working as a street asphalt worker for the City of Cincinnati.

== Personal life, death, and legacy ==
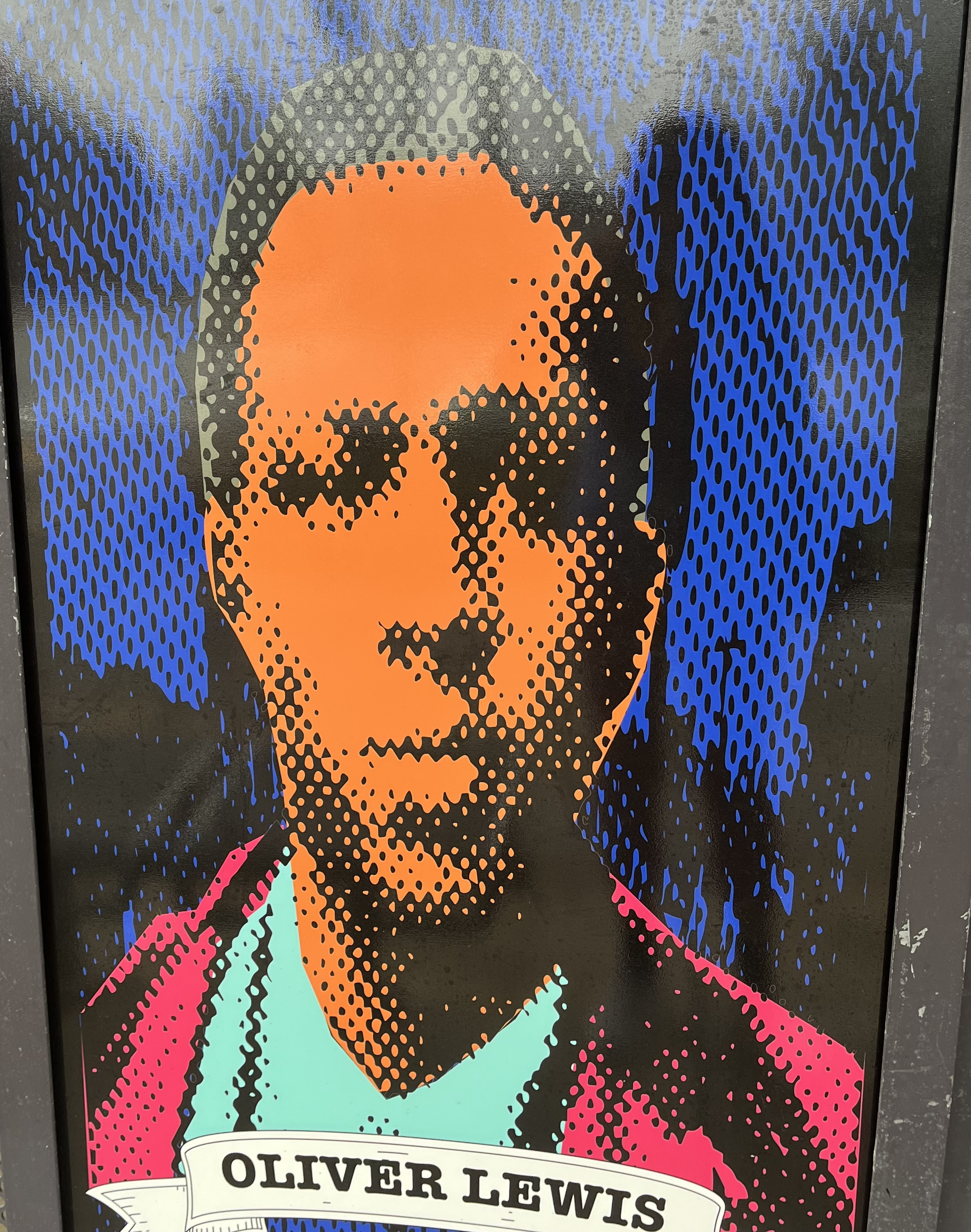
Lewis as portrayed in public art in Lexington KY, corner of 3rd St. and Elm Tree Lane

Lewis married Lucy Wright Lewis (1862–1958) in 1881, in Lexington. The couple had six children: James Andrew Lewis (1881–1972), who inherited his father's lucrative bookmaking business, Julia Lewis Brown (1886–1907), Irvin Lewis (1889–1966), Pearl Banister Lewis (1897–1969), Queenie Lewis Bibb (1901–1966), and Stanley Lewis (1904–1933).

Oliver Lewis died from mitral insufficiency and kidney disease in Cincinnati, Ohio, on January 30, 1924, at the age of 67. His widow Lucy Lewis died 34 years later, in Cincinnati, on November 29, 1958, at the age of 96.

After his death in 1924, Lewis was buried in Benevolent Society No. 2 Cemetery, in Lexington, Kentucky, which is now known as African Cemetery No. 2.

On September 8, 2010, the Newtown Pike Extension in Lexington, Kentucky was named Oliver Lewis Way in honor of Lewis's historic accomplishments. Oliver Lewis is the great-great-grandfather of actor Rodney Van Johnson.
