= Foxford (disambiguation) =

Foxford is a town in Ireland. It may also refer to:

- Foxford (horse), an American racehorse
- Foxford Community School, a secondary school in Coventry, England
- Foxford railway station, a railway station in Foxford, Ireland
- Foxford, a character in the television series Monster High
- Baron Foxford, a subsidiary title of the Earl of Limerick
