= Faugh-a-Ballagh =

Irish-bred Thoroughbred racehorse

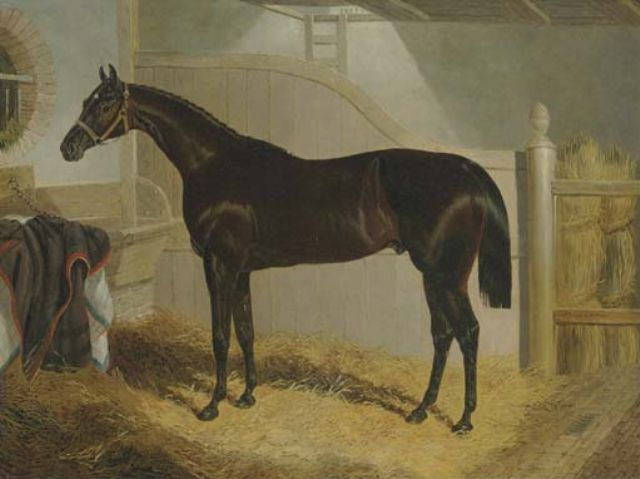
- Faugh-a-Ballagh
- Sire: Sir Hercules
- Grandsire: Whalebone
- Dam: Guiccioli
- Damsire: Bob Booty
- Sex: Stallion
- Foaled: 1841
- Country: Ireland
- Colour: Brown, with a star
- Breeder: Lord Chedworth
- Owner: Mr. Martindale; E. J. Erwin
- Trainer: John Forth

Major wins
- St. Leger Stakes (1844); Cesarewitch Handicap (1844)
- Last updated on 7 June 2010

Faugh-a-Ballagh (foaled 1841 in Ireland) was a Thoroughbred racehorse. A brother to Birdcatcher, Faugh-a-Ballagh was sold to E. J. Erwin in 1842. He ran once as a two-year-old at the Doncaster's Champagne Stakes, finishing third to The Cure and Sorella. He then began his three-year-old season as the first Irish-bred horse to win the St. Leger Stakes, then beat Corona in a match race. He won the Grand Duke Michael Stakes, then the Cesarewitch, and came second to Evenus at the Cambridgeshire. As a four-year-old, he finished second to The Emperor in the Emperor of Russia's Plate.

In 1855, Faugh-a-Ballagh was exported to France. There he sired Fille de l'air, The Oaks and French Oaks winner. He also sired the great stallion Leamington, that sired the American racehorse and leading sire Longfellow, as well as Iroquois, the first American-bred horse to win The Derby.

== Sire line tree ==
- Faugh-a-Ballagh
  - Goldfinder
  - Le Juif
  - Ethelwolf
  - Father Thames
  - Lucio
  - Morning Star
  - Ethelbert
    - Big Ben
    - King Of Kent
      - Pagnini
    - Adalbert
  - Barrel
  - Fearless
  - Knight Of The Garter
  - Leamington
    - Enquirer
      - Falsetto
        - Patron
        - Chant
        - Bright Phoebus
        - Counter Tenor
        - His Eminence
        - The Picket
        - Sir Huon
      - Emperor
      - Inspector B
        - The Foreman
    - Longfellow
      - Leonard
      - Longtaw
        - Sam Corey
      - Passaic
      - Freeland
      - Leonatus
        - Tillo
        - Pink Coat
      - The Bard
        - Gold Heels
      - Long Dance
      - Longstreet
        - The Parader
        - Stone Street
      - Riley
      - Wadsworth
        - Stonewood
    - Lynchburg
    - Lyttleton
    - Eolus
      - Eole
      - Knight of Ellerslie
        - Henry of Navarre
      - St Saviour
      - Morello
    - Reform
      - Azra
    - Aristides
    - Hyder Ali
      - Spokane
    - James A
    - Rhadamanthus
    - Parole
    - Stratford
      - Foxford
    - Harold
    - Sensation
      - Refund
      - Jean Beraud
      - Donnie
      - Democrat
    - Iroquois
      - Cayuga
        - Parachute
      - Huron
      - Tammany
      - G W Johnson
        - Lieutenant Gibson
    - Saunterer
    - Onandaga
    - Powhattan
      - Burlington
  - The Brewer
  - Master Bagot
    - Lottery
  - The Hadji
    - Terror
  - Ben Brace
  - Blackthorn
  - Knight Of The Blaze
  - Garibaldi
  - Pretendant
  - L'Africain
  - Armagnac
  - Jarnicoton

== Pedigree ==
Pedigree of Faugh-a-Ballagh (IRE) Br. 1841
Sire Sir Hercules Br. 1841	Whalebone; 1807	Waxy	Potoooooooo
Sire Sir Hercules Br. 1841	Whalebone; 1807	Waxy	Maria
Sire Sir Hercules Br. 1841	Whalebone; 1807	Penelope	Trumpator
Sire Sir Hercules Br. 1841	Whalebone; 1807	Penelope	Prunella
Sire Sir Hercules Br. 1841	Peri; 1822	Wanderer	Gohanna
Sire Sir Hercules Br. 1841	Peri; 1822	Wanderer	Catherine*
Sire Sir Hercules Br. 1841	Peri; 1822	Thalestris	Alexander
Sire Sir Hercules Br. 1841	Peri; 1822	Thalestris	Rival
Dam Guiccioli 1823	Bob Booty; 1804	Chanticleer	Woodpecker*
Dam Guiccioli 1823	Bob Booty; 1804	Chanticleer	Eclipse mare
Dam Guiccioli 1823	Bob Booty; 1804	Ierne	Bagot*
Dam Guiccioli 1823	Bob Booty; 1804	Ierne	Gamahoe Mare
Dam Guiccioli 1823	Flight; 1809	Escape	Commodore
Dam Guiccioli 1823	Flight; 1809	Escape	Moll in the Wad
Dam Guiccioli 1823	Flight; 1809	Young Heroine	Bagot*
Dam Guiccioli 1823	Flight; 1809	Young Heroine	Old Heroine

* Faugh-a-Ballagh is inbred 4D x 4D to the stallion Bagot, meaning that he appears fourth generation twice on the dam side of his pedigree.

* Faugh-a-Ballagh is inbred 5S x 4D to the stallion Woodpecker, meaning that he appears fifth generation (via Catherine) on the sire side of his pedigree, and fourth generation on the dam side of his pedigree.
