= Eight Thirty =

American-bred Thoroughbred racehorse

- Sire: Pilate
- Grandsire: Friar Rock
- Dam: Dinner Time
- Damsire: High Time
- Sex: Stallion
- Foaled: 1936
- Country: United States
- Colour: Chestnut
- Breeder: George D. Widener Jr.
- Owner: Erdenheim Farm
- Trainer: Bert Mulholland
- Record: 27: 16-3-5
- Earnings: $155,475

Major wins
- Christiana Stakes (1938); Flash Stakes (1938); Wilson Stakes (1939, 1940); Saratoga Handicap (1939); Travers Stakes (1939); Whitney Handicap (1939); Suburban Handicap (1940); Massachusetts Handicap (1940); Toboggan Handicap (1940, 1941); Metropolitan Handicap (1941)

Honours
- United States Racing Hall of Fame (1994) #78 - Top 100 U.S. Racehorses of the 20th Century; Eight Thirty Stakes at Delaware Park Racetrack
- Last updated on January 13, 2007

Eight Thirty (March 27, 1936 – April 7, 1965) was an American Hall of Fame Thoroughbred racehorse. He was owned by George D. Widener Jr. and bred by his Erdenheim Farm. Widener is one of only five people ever named an Exemplar of Racing. Eight Thirty was a descendant of Fair Play, who had been purchased from the estate of August Belmont Jr. by Widener's uncle, Joseph E. Widener.

Racing at age two in 1938, Eight Thirty won two important graded stakes races but was overshadowed by William Ziegler Jr.'s Champion 2-Yr-Old Colt El Chico.

In 1939, Eight Thirty started his three-year-old racing season slowly and did not enter any of the American Classic Races. However, competing in the East Coast racing scene along with greats such as Johnstown and Challedon, in one month alone, Eight Thirty won four straight important stakes races. He ended his season with seven wins out of his ten starts. Racing at age four and five, he won six of ten starts while setting a track record in his win in the 1940 Massachusetts Handicap.

Retired to stud duty at his owner's breeding farm, Eight Thirty proved to be a successful Stallion. He sired 44 stakes winners and was the damsire of 1962 Belmont Stakes winner Jaipur. Eight Thirty died on April 7, 1965.

Eight Thirty was inducted into the National Museum of Racing and Hall of Fame in 1994.

== Pedigree ==
Pedigree of Eight Thirty, chestnut colt, 1936
Sire Pilate	Friar Rock	Rock Sand	Sainfoin
Sire Pilate	Friar Rock	Rock Sand	Roquebrune
Sire Pilate	Friar Rock	Fairy Gold	Bend Or
Sire Pilate	Friar Rock	Fairy Gold	Dame Masham
Sire Pilate	Herodias	The Tetrarch	Roi Herode
Sire Pilate	Herodias	The Tetrarch	Vahren
Sire Pilate	Herodias	Honora	Gallinule
Sire Pilate	Herodias	Honora	Word of Honour
Dam Dinner Time	High Time	Ultimus	Commando
Dam Dinner Time	High Time	Ultimus	Running Stream
Dam Dinner Time	High Time	Noonday	Domino
Dam Dinner Time	High Time	Noonday	Sundown
Dam Dinner Time	Seaplane	Man o' War	Fair Play
Dam Dinner Time	Seaplane	Man o' War	Mahubah
Dam Dinner Time	Seaplane	Bathing Girl	Spearmint
Dam Dinner Time	Seaplane	Bathing Girl	Summer Girl (family: 11-g)
