= Leamington (horse) =

19th-century American Thoroughbred racehorse and sire

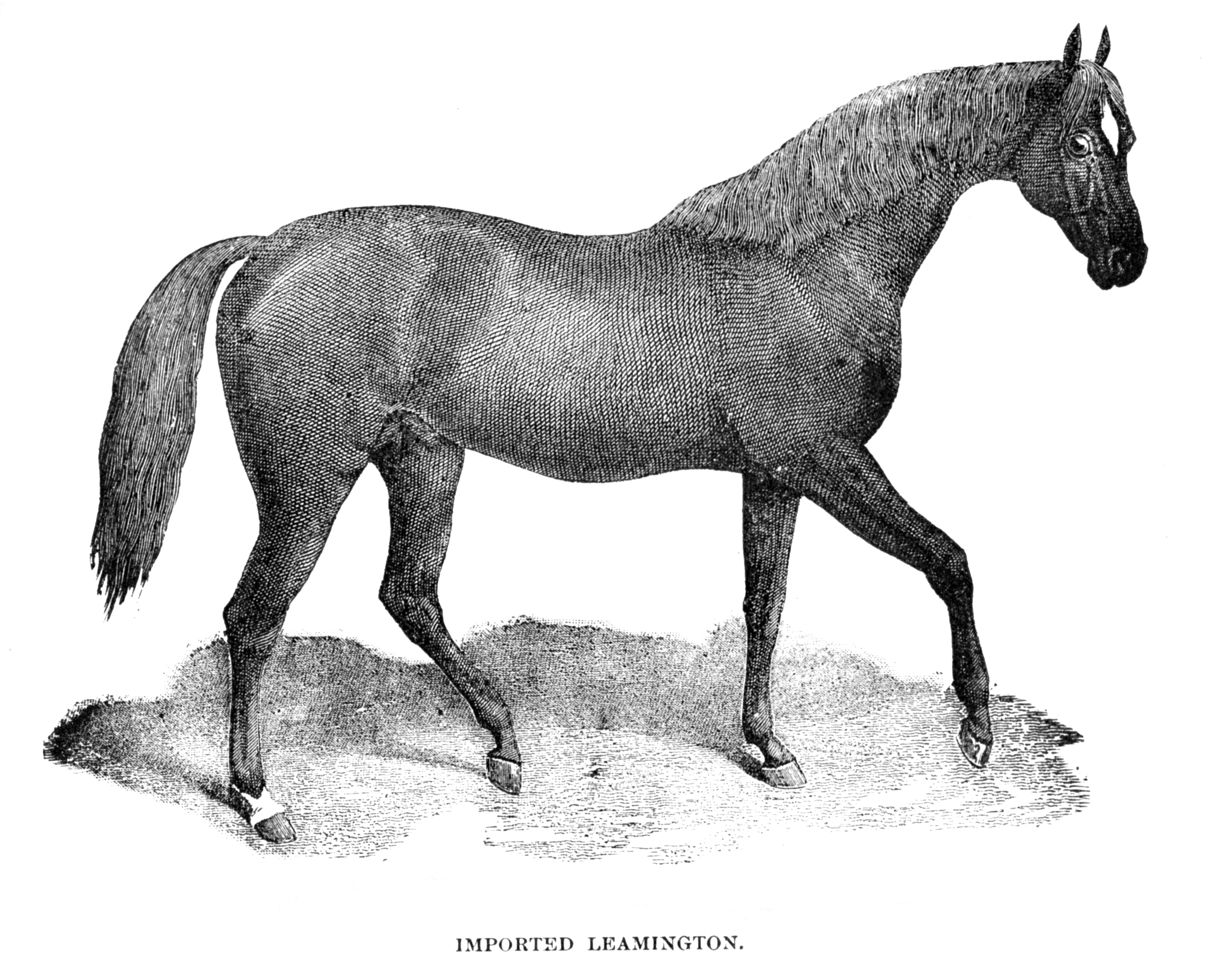
- Leamington from Wallace's Monthly Magazine, July 1877
- Sire: Faugh-a-Ballagh
- Grandsire: Sir Hercules
- Dam: Pantaloon Mare (14) (1841)
- Damsire: Pantaloon
- Sex: Stallion
- Foaled: 1853
- Country: Great Britain
- Colour: Brown
- Breeder: Mr. Halford
- Owner: Mr. Higgins
- Record: 25 starts, 8 places
- Earnings: £8,790

Major wins
- Woodcote Stakes (1855); Chesterfield Stakes (1855); Stewards' Cup (1856); Goodwood Stakes (1857); Chester Cup (1857, 1859)

Awards
- Leading sire in North America (1875, 1877, 1879, 1881)
- Last updated on 1 August 2011

Leamington (1853–1878) was a champion American Thoroughbred racehorse and an influential sire in the United States during the second half of the nineteenth century.

== Background ==
Leamington was a brown horse bred in England by Mr. Halford. Leamington was by the top racehorse and sire Faugh-a-Ballagh (by Sir Hercules). His dam was an unnamed mare by Pantaloon who was bred by the Marquis of Westminster.

== Racing career ==
=== 1855: Two-Year-Old Season ===
Halford began racing him at age two, and then sold him to a Mr. Higgins. Leamington won the Woodcote Stakes at Warwick and the Chesterfield Stakes before retiring for the year.

=== 1856: Three-Year-Old Season ===
As a three-year-old, he was planning to run the colt in The Derby, but he contracted strangles, and this affected his whole three-year-old season. However, his owners and trainers appeared to have planned his losses to help keep his handicap weight down. After losing four small races and carrying little weight, he won the Wolverhampton, before losing several more. He was then "allowed" to win the Stewards' Cup carrying only 98 pounds (44 kg).

=== 1857: Four-Year-Old Season ===
Leamington's four-year-old season began with the 2.25 mile Chester Cup. Leamington only carried 93 pounds (42 kg), due to his poor reputation gained as a three-year-old, and he easily won the race. The colt then came fourth at the Ascot Gold Cup. He went on to the Goodwood Stakes, carrying only 118 pounds (54 kg) with odds of 100 to 3, and easily won the race by a length. His owners won quite a bit of money from wagering on him that day, after their longshot with 100 to 3 odds beat out a field of 19. However, his win earned him top weight of 131 pounds (59 kg) at his next race, the Chesterfield Cup, and he could not hold out.

=== 1858: Five-Year-Old Season ===
Leamington only made one start as a five-year-old, carrying 130 pounds (59 kg) as the handicapper realized how Leamington's owners had been manipulating his races. The weight was too much for Leamington to carry and he couldn't win.

=== 1859: Six-Year-Old Season ===
Leamigton had a successful start to his six-year-old season, easily winning the Chester Cup against a good field. He finished second in his next race, the Gold Vase at Ascot Racecourse.

In his final race of the season, the Goodwood Cup, Leamington injured his right foreleg.

=== 1860: Seven-Year-Old Season ===
Leamington trained up for The Whip Stakes, a strenuous four-mile race. He broke down while preparing for the race, and was retired to stud at Rawcliffe Paddocks.

== Stud career ==
Leamington sired 19 winners of 42 races while at Rawcliffe. He was then purchased by the Canadian Roderick W. Cameron for £1,575, and stood at General Abe Buford's Bosque Bonita Stud near Versailles, Kentucky for the 1866 season. He bred only thirteen mares, but produced an outstanding crop of foals, including Longfellow, Enquirer, Lyttleton, Lynchburg, Anna Mace, and Miss Alice.

Cameron then sent the stallion to his own Clifton Stud on Staten Island. He was then moved to New Jersey in 1868, before being shipped to Annieswood Farm in 1871. His offspring were now noted for their speed and included Aristides, the winner of the first Kentucky Derby.

Leamington was sold to Aristides Welch, who stood the stallion at his Erdenheim Stud, near Philadelphia, Pennsylvania. Leamington finished his life here, dying on May 6, 1878, at the age of 25. During his breeding career, he was the leading sire in North America four times, including leading Lexington in 1875 for the first time in 16 years. He also earned this title in 1877, 1879, and 1881.

Horses sired by Leamington included:

- Aristides (1872) won the first Kentucky Derby and Withers Stakes
- Harold (1876) won 1879 Preakness Stakes
- Iroquois (1878) the first American horse to win Epsom Derby and GB St. Leger Stakes
- Eolus (1868), sire of Knight of Ellerslie (1881), winner of the 1884 Preakness Stakes
- Longfellow (1867) a great sire himself
- Parole (1873) one of the three greatest runners in the 1870s
- Saunterer, won Belmont Stakes and Preakness Stakes

== Sire line tree ==
- Leamington
  - Enquirer
    - Falsetto
      - Patron
      - Chant
      - Bright Phoebus
      - Counter Tenor
      - His Eminence
      - The Picket
      - Sir Huon
    - Emperor
    - Inspector B
      - The Foreman
  - Longfellow
    - Leonard
    - Longtaw
      - Sam Corey
    - Passaic
    - Freeland
    - Leonatus
      - Tillo
      - Pink Coat
        - Pink Star
    - The Bard
      - Gold Heels
    - Long Dance
    - Longstreet
      - The Parader
      - Stone Street
    - Riley
    - Wadsworth
      - Stonewood
  - Lynchburg
  - Lyttleton
  - Eolus
    - Eole
    - Knight of Ellerslie
      - Henry of Navarre
        - June Gayle
        - Dick Turpin
        - Don Diego
    - St Saviour
    - Morello
  - Reform
    - Azra
  - Aristides
  - Hyder Ali
    - Spokane
  - James A
  - Rhadamanthus
  - Parole
  - Stratford
    - Foxford
  - Harold
  - Sensation
    - Refund
    - Jean Beraud
    - Donnie
    - Democrat
  - Iroquois
    - Cayuga
      - Parachute
        - Pebbles
    - Huron
    - Tammany
    - G W Johnson
      - Lieutenant Gibson
  - Saunterer
  - Onandaga
  - Powhattan
    - Burlington

== Pedigree ==
Pedigree of Leamington (GB), brown stallion, 1853
Sire Faugh-a-Ballagh (IRE) Br. 1841	Sir Hercules; 1826	Whalebone	Waxy
Sire Faugh-a-Ballagh (IRE) Br. 1841	Sir Hercules; 1826	Whalebone	Penelope
Sire Faugh-a-Ballagh (IRE) Br. 1841	Sir Hercules; 1826	Peri	Wanderer
Sire Faugh-a-Ballagh (IRE) Br. 1841	Sir Hercules; 1826	Peri	Thalestris
Sire Faugh-a-Ballagh (IRE) Br. 1841	Guiccioli; 1823	Bob Booty	Chanticleer
Sire Faugh-a-Ballagh (IRE) Br. 1841	Guiccioli; 1823	Bob Booty	Ierne
Sire Faugh-a-Ballagh (IRE) Br. 1841	Guiccioli; 1823	Flight	Escape
Sire Faugh-a-Ballagh (IRE) Br. 1841	Guiccioli; 1823	Flight	Young Heroine
Dam Pantaloon Mare 1841	Pantaloon; 1824	Castrel	Buzzard
Dam Pantaloon Mare 1841	Pantaloon; 1824	Castrel	Alexander mare
Dam Pantaloon Mare 1841	Pantaloon; 1824	Idalia	Peruvian
Dam Pantaloon Mare 1841	Pantaloon; 1824	Idalia	Musidora
Dam Pantaloon Mare 1841	Daphne; 1837	Laurel	Blacklock
Dam Pantaloon Mare 1841	Daphne; 1837	Laurel	Wagtail
Dam Pantaloon Mare 1841	Daphne; 1837	Maid of Honor	Champion
Dam Pantaloon Mare 1841	Daphne; 1837	Maid of Honor	Etiquette (Family: 14)
