= Harold (horse) =

American-bred Thoroughbred racehorse

- Sire: Leamington
- Grandsire: Faugh-a-Ballagh
- Dam: Maggie B. B.
- Damsire: Australian
- Sex: Stallion
- Foaled: 1876
- Country: United States
- Colour: Chestnut
- Breeder: Aristides Welch
- Owner: George L. Lorillard
- Trainer: R. Wyndham Walden
- Record: Not found
- Earnings: Not found

Major wins
- Flash Stakes (1878); Saratoga Stakes (1878); July Stakes (1878) Triple Crown wins: Preakness Stakes (1879)

Awards
- American Champion Two-Year-Old Colt (1878)

Harold (foaled 1876 in Pennsylvania) was an American Thoroughbred racehorse.

== Background ==
Harold was a chestnut horse bred by Aristides Welch who owned both his sire and his dam. Sired by Leamington, a four-time Leading sire in North America, he was out of the mare, Maggie B. B. who produced two other Classic winners: Iroquois, a full brother to Harold who became the first American-bred horse to ever win England's renowned Epsom Derby, plus the colt Panique by Alarm who won the 1884 Belmont Stakes.

Harold was acquired by the prominent New York stable owner, George L. Lorillard. He entrusted his race conditioning to future U.S. racing Hall of Fame trainer R. W. Walden who would call Harold the best horse he had ever trained

== Racing career ==
Racing at age two, Harold won important races in 1878 and is regarded historically as the American Champion Two-Year-Old Male Horse. At age three, he won the Preakness Stakes, but in the ensuing Withers Stakes he suffered a ruptured blood vessel from which he never fully recovered and won only one more race before being retired to stud.

== Stud record ==
Harold died after serving just one full season at stud.

== Pedigree ==
Pedigree of Harold
Sire Leamington 1853	Faugh-a-Ballagh 1841	Sir Hercules	Whalebone
Sire Leamington 1853	Faugh-a-Ballagh 1841	Sir Hercules	Peri
Sire Leamington 1853	Faugh-a-Ballagh 1841	Guiccioli	Bob Booty
Sire Leamington 1853	Faugh-a-Ballagh 1841	Guiccioli	Flight
Sire Leamington 1853	Pantaloon Mare 1841	Pantaloon	Castrel
Sire Leamington 1853	Pantaloon Mare 1841	Pantaloon	Idalia
Sire Leamington 1853	Pantaloon Mare 1841	Daphne	Laurel
Sire Leamington 1853	Pantaloon Mare 1841	Daphne	Maid of Honor
Dam Maggie B. B. 1867	Australian 1858	West Australian	Melbourne
Dam Maggie B. B. 1867	Australian 1858	West Australian	Mowerina
Dam Maggie B. B. 1867	Australian 1858	Emilia	Young Emilius
Dam Maggie B. B. 1867	Australian 1858	Emilia	Persian
Dam Maggie B. B. 1867	Madeline 1849	Boston	Timoleon
Dam Maggie B. B. 1867	Madeline 1849	Boston	Sister to Tuckahoe
Dam Maggie B. B. 1867	Madeline 1849	Magnolia	Glencoe
Dam Maggie B. B. 1867	Madeline 1849	Magnolia	Myrtle
