= Refund (horse) =

American-bred Thoroughbred racehorse

- Sire: Sensation
- Grandsire: Leamington
- Dam: Letty
- Damsire: Australian
- Sex: Stallion
- Foaled: 1885
- Country: United States
- Colour: Chestnut
- Breeder: R. Wyndham Walden
- Owner: R. Wyndham Walden
- Trainer: R. Wyndham Walden

Major wins
- American Classics wins: Preakness Stakes (1888)

Refund was an American Thoroughbred racehorse. Ridden by Fred Littlefield, he won the 1888 Preakness Stakes.

== Pedigree ==
Pedigree of Refund, chestnut colt, 1885
Sire Sensation	Leamington	Faugh-a-Ballagh	Sir Hercules
Sire Sensation	Leamington	Faugh-a-Ballagh	Guiccioli
Sire Sensation	Leamington	Pantaloon mare	Pantaloon
Sire Sensation	Leamington	Pantaloon mare	Daphne
Sire Sensation	Susan Beane	Lexington	Boston
Sire Sensation	Susan Beane	Lexington	Alice Carneal
Sire Sensation	Susan Beane	Sally Lewis	Glencoe
Sire Sensation	Susan Beane	Sally Lewis	Motto
Dam Letty	Australian	West Australian	Melbourne
Dam Letty	Australian	West Australian	Mowerina
Dam Letty	Australian	Emilia	Young Emilius*
Dam Letty	Australian	Emilia	Persian
Dam Letty	Little Miss	Sovereign	Emilius*
Dam Letty	Little Miss	Sovereign	Fleur-de-Lis
Dam Letty	Little Miss	Little Mistress	Shamrock
Dam Letty	Little Miss	Little Mistress	Glance (family: 4-r)

* Refund is inbred 5D x 4D to the stallion Emilius, meaning that he appears fifth generation (via Young Emilius) and fourth generation on the dam side of his pedigree.
