= Aristides Welch =

American racehorse breeder

- Born: September 28, 1811; Shippensburg, Pennsylvania, U.S.
- Died: April 9, 1890 (aged 78); Philadelphia, Pennsylvania, U.S.
- Resting place: Oak Hill Cemetery, Washington, D.C., U.S.
- Occupation: Thoroughbred racehorse breeder
- Known for: Erdenheim Stud Farm
- Spouse: Henrietta Armstrong (1832-1870)
- Parent: Ebenezer & Mary Heap Welch
- Honors: Aristides

Aristides J. Welch (September 28, 1811 – April 9, 1890) was an American Thoroughbred racehorse breeder.

Welch owned Erdenheim Stud Farm at Chestnut Hill, Pennsylvania. In 1870, he purchased the mare Maggie B. B. from Captain T. G. Moore and stood her at Erdenheim. In 1872, he purchased the sire Leamington. Welch's broodmare selections led to Leamington becoming the leading sire in North America in 1875, 1877, 1879, and 1881. Maggie B B produced three Classic winners, two of which were sired by Leamington. Their first was the 1879 Preakness Stakes winner, Harold, and their second was Iroquois, who in 1881 became the first American-bred horse to ever win England's famous Epsom Derby. Maggie B. B.'s third Classic winner was the colt Panique by Welch's stallion, Alarm. Panique won the 1884 Belmont Stakes.

Welch served with the United States Navy from June 1846 to February 1856, initially as a purser aboard the USS Princeton.

Among Welch's clients was friend and fellow Lexington breeder, H. Price McGrath, owner of McGrathiana Stud. McGrath's mare Sarong was one of Leamington's mates in his first season at stud for Welch, producing a colt which McGrath named Aristides in honor of his friend. The horse Aristides won the inaugural running of the Kentucky Derby.

In May 1882, Welch sold Erdenheim Stud and the bulk of its bloodstock to Commodore Norman Kittson and his brother James of Saint Paul, Minnesota.

Welch died on April 9, 1890. He was buried at Oak Hill Cemetery in Washington, D.C.
