= Jaipur (horse) =

American-bred Thoroughbred racehorse

- Sire: Nasrullah
- Grandsire: Nearco
- Dam: Rare Perfume
- Damsire: Eight Thirty
- Sex: Stallion
- Foaled: 1959
- Country: United States
- Colour: Dark Bay
- Breeder: Erdenheim Farm
- Owner: George D. Widener Jr.
- Trainer: Winbert F. Mulholland
- Record: 19: 10-6-0
- Earnings: $618,926

Major wins
- Flash Stakes (1961); Cowdin Stakes (1961); Hopeful Stakes (1961); Gotham Stakes (1962); Choice Stakes (1962); Travers Stakes (1962); Withers Stakes (1962); Triple Crown race wins: Belmont Stakes (1962)

Awards
- U.S. Champion 3-Yr-Old Colt (1962)

Honours
- Jaipur Stakes at Belmont Park
- Last updated on February 20, 2007

Jaipur (April 8, 1959 – July 27, 1987) was an American Thoroughbred racehorse who won the 1962 Belmont Stakes and was voted that year's U.S. Eclipse Award for Outstanding 3-Year-Old Male Horse.

== Background ==
Jaipur was a son of Nasrullah out of the mare Rare Perfume, whose sire was Eight Thirty. He was bred by George D. Widener Jr.'s Erdenheim Farm and foaled at Old Kenney Farm in Lexington.

As a yearling, Jaipur was broken and exercised by soon-to-be jockey Michael Tornambe, who was the first person to ride the colt. He was also under the care of farm manager Ralph Delaney.

== Racing career ==
=== 1961: Two-year-old season ===
Trained by future U.S. Racing Hall of Fame inductee Bert Mulholland and ridden by Eddie Arcaro, Jaipur won his maiden race with a margin of over six lengths at Aqueduct. He would go onto win the Hopeful and Cowdin Stakes while placing second in his other three stakes starts: the Saratoga Special, Futurity Stakes, and the Champagne Stakes. Jaipur was retired for the rest of the year by late-October.

=== 1962: Three-year-old season ===
After spending the winter at Hialeah, Jaipur returned to Aqueduct. Because of Arcaro's retirement, Bill Shoemaker had been chosen to replace him as the horse's jockey. On April 7, Jaipur ran in the Gotham Stakes, winning despite the sloppy going and beating opponents Sunrise County and Donut King.

The horse was unable to run in the Wood Memorial Stakes due to a bruised heel. He also was not entered in the Kentucky Derby due to Widener's belief that the race was too early in the season and at too long of a distance for a three-year-old to run. Jaipur returned in mid-May, winning the Withers Stakes before being sent to Pimlico to compete in the Preakness Stakes.

Jaipur was made one of the favorites going into the Preakness. Ridden by Bobby Ussery, Jaipur was positioned towards the front for most of the race. Starting at the final turn, Jaipur began to fade and finished tenth in an eleven-horse field.

Over a week later, Jaipur was brought to Garden State for the Jersey Derby. He, Crimson Satan, and Admiral's Voyage, entered into a three-way duel as they came into the final stretch. Approaching the final furlong, Crimson Satan lugged in and bumping against Admiral's Voyage, which caused him to hit Jaipur. The stewards disqualified Crimson Satan and his jockey, Larry Gilligan, and moved them to third place for this incident. Jaipur and jockey Larry Adams were then moved to first place, winning the race.

A similar event would occur at the Belmont Stakes, Jaipur's next start. The same three horses were heading towards the finish line when Crimson Satan drifted towards the other two once again, bumping into Jaipur. According to Shoemaker, who was riding Jaipur, being hit upset the horse and made him "[want] to get away". He would win the Belmont by a nose, becoming the first and only horse owned by George D. Widener Jr. to achieve that victory.

In the days following his win in the Belmont Stakes, Jaipur's temperament started to become hard to manage. The colt would refuse to work out at the main track at Belmont. When he was brought to the training track, he threw his exercise rider and ran to the barns. Hoping the break would improve the horse's temper, Mulholland would send Jaipur to Widener's Erdenheim Farm for seven weeks, a decision that came at the cost of running in the Leonard Richards Stakes.

The horse was able to return to training and would go on to win the Choice Stakes at Monmouth Park.

On August 18, Jaipur and Ridan would go head-to-head the entire 1 1/4-mile distance of the Travers Stakes at Saratoga, a race that would determine the 1962 U.S. Champion Three-Year-Old Horse. Both horses would break Man o' War's previous race record by 1/5 of a second, finishing a narrow nose apart. The margin was so close that footage from the photo-finish camera had to be reviewed before Jaipur was declared the winner.

Jaipur did not win any more races that year. On September 29, he would be beaten by Kelso by four-and-a-half lengths at the Woodward Stakes. In October, he placed sixth in the Manhattan Handicap due to his bit falling out around the half-mile pole. His final start of the year would be in November, at the Roamer Handicap where he placed second behind Dead Ahead.

== Stud career ==
Pensioned in 1974, Jaipur died on July 27, 1987.
