= Norman Kittson =

American steamboat operator and railroad entrepreneur (1814-1888)

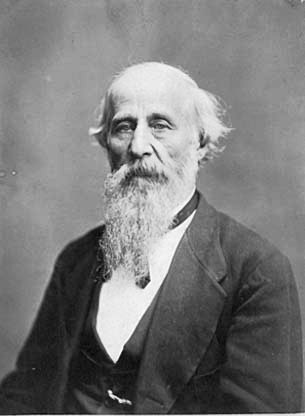
- Kittson c. 1880

Personal details
- Born: Norman Kittson; March 6, 1814 Sorel, Lower Canada
- Died: May 10, 1888 (aged 74) traveling near St. Paul, Minnesota, U.S.
- Resting place: Oakland Cemetery, Saint Paul, Minnesota
- Spouses: Élise Marion (died 1868): Sophia Perret; Mary Cochrane
- Children: 9
- Occupation: Steamboat operator, railroad entrepreneur

Norman Wolfred Kittson (March 6, 1814 – May 10, 1888) was one of early Minnesota's most prominent citizens. He was a fur trader, then a steamboat-line operator and finally a railway entrepreneur and owner of thoroughbred racehorses. He was part of the original syndicate that created the Canadian Pacific Railway. Kittson County, Minnesota is named for him. Norman County, Minnesota also was named for him.

== Early years ==
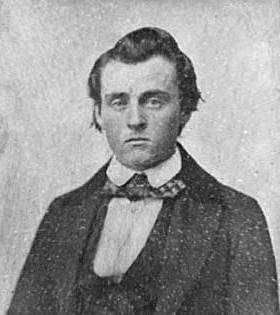
Kittson as a young man

Norman Wolfred Kittson was the eighth of ten children born to George Kittson (1779–1832), and Ann Tucker. George was a merchant, Justice of the Peace, clerk of the Commisariat and King's auctioneer at Sorel, and later Principal Cashier of the Bank of Canada in Montreal, both in Lower Canada. Ann Tucker, of Sorel, was the daughter of Sergeant John Tucker (d.1782) of the 53rd Regiment of Foot. Norman was born 6 March 1814, and baptized on 27 March of the same year in Sorel. His middle name 'Wolfred' was given to Norman to honour a family friend, Wolfred Nelson.

Norman's grandfather, Thomas Kittson, was in the British Army, probably in the 24th Regiment of Foot, and likely was killed or taken prisoner in the fall of 1777 at the Battles of Saratoga. Thomas was married to Julia Calcutt (1756–1835), who had likely travelled with him and the Regiment in April 1776 from Cork, Ireland to Trois-Rivières. By 1779, Julia and her infant son George were living with Alexander Henry in Montreal. Julia and Alexander had four children out of wedlock, and did marry by licence in Montreal in 1785, likely after receiving the official news that Thomas Kittson was deceased. They had a fifth child after getting married.

== Fur trading ==
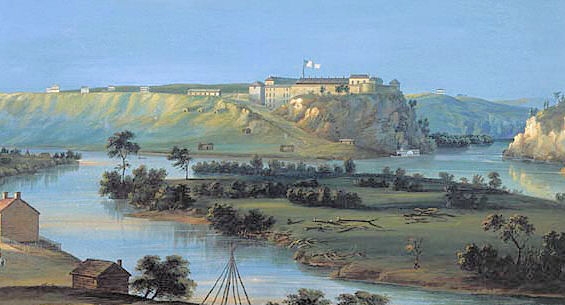
Fort Snelling in 1844

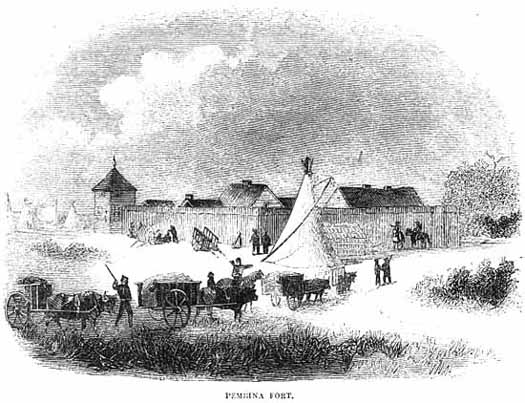
Fort Pembina, circa 1870

Kittson received a grammar school education at Sorel, and like everyone in his family he was perfectly bilingual. His step-grandfather Alexander Henry and four of his five paternal uncles had all been active in the fur trade, particularly the North West Company. It therefore was no surprise that, seeking adventure, in 1830 he took an apprenticeship with the American Fur Company at Michilimackinac, where Alexander Henry and many others from Sorel had been active. Kittson served at various posts in what became Minnesota Territory in the United States.

Kittson left the American Fur Company in 1833 to become a clerk to the sutler at Fort Snelling. In 1839, he went into business for himself, setting up as a fur trader and supply merchant at Cold Lake, near Fort Snelling. Henry Hastings Sibley, Kittson's old friend from the American Fur Company had risen to managing agent of the AFC, but left in 1843 to form a partnership with Kittson.

In 1844, maintaining a large degree of independence, Kittson established a permanent post at Pembina, North Dakota, where he made his headquarters. Covering the Red River Valley, he boldly set himself up in direct competition to the Hudson's Bay Company, whose headquarters were only 100 km away in the Red River Colony at Rupert's Land. Kittson's almost immediate success at Pembina threatened the trade monopoly exerted by the HBC.

He served in the Minnesota Territorial Council from 1852 to 1855, while living in Pembina.

Kittson collected furs from James Sinclair and established strong connections to the local French Canadians. Through his first wife, he became particularly attached to the Métis people, employing them as tripmen and trading extensively with them. All of this enabled him to play a significant part in bringing about free trade to the settlement in 1849. Guillaume Sayer was trading with Kittson prior to the trial that ended the monopoly. In 1852, Kittson relocated from Pembina to St. Joseph to avoid the periodic flooding of the Red River of the North.

== St. Paul, Minnesota ==
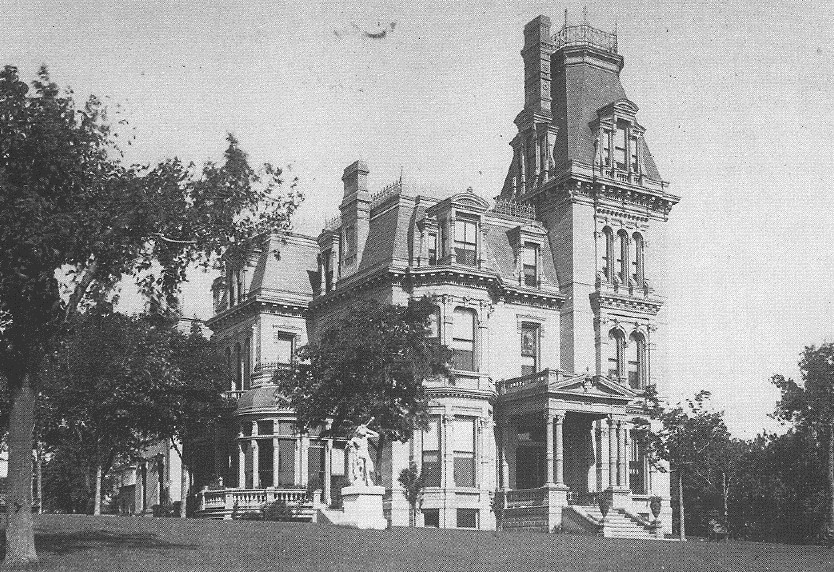
Norman Kittson's house at St. Paul

In the 1850s, a contemporary described Kittson as a "sprightly, fine-looking man; cleanly and really elegantly dressed; hair just turning gray; eyes bright, with a quiet, pleasant voice; genial in nature and a man of excellent characteristics". Kittson moved to Minnesota's new capital, St. Paul, in 1854, becoming one the city's most influential businessman. He operated a fur and goods business and had several investments and real estate holdings. Kittson served on the St. Paul City Council from 1856 to 1858. From 1858 to 1859 he served as mayor.

During this period, his business interests extended into the Red River Colony, which he was committed to developing. In 1856, he opened a store at St. Boniface (now modern Winnipeg, Manitoba) and the following year he and other merchants shipped over $120,000 of furs from the Red River Settlement to St Paul. Although he sold the store in 1861, Kittson continued to import furs from the settlement and provide it with supplies. He was a long-time operator of Red River cart brigades on the Red River Trails, which served his trading businesses.

== Steamboat operations ==
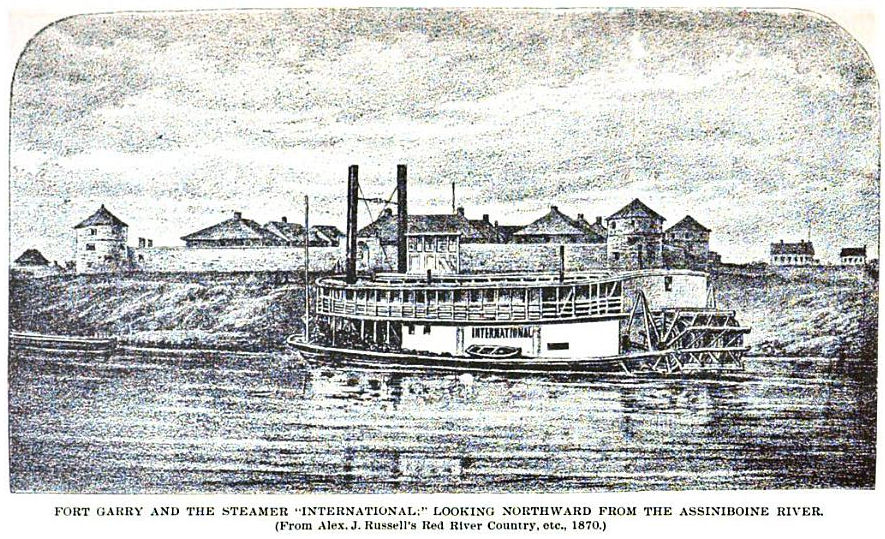
The steamship International at Fort Garry, c. 1870

Sir George Simpson, the governor of Kittson's old rival, the Hudson's Bay Company, described him in the 1850s as "the most extensive and respectable of the American traders doing business at Red River". In 1858 Kittson was instrumental in establishing a steamboat service on the Red River of the North, a route which was also used by the HBC. Simpson's successor, Alexander Grant Dallas, managed to convert Kittson "from an opponent into an ally". In 1862, the Hudson's Bay Company appointed him shipping agent and head of navigation on the Red River, a position he retained throughout the 1860s to the great mutual benefit of both Kittson and the HBC. He co-ordinated the import of trade goods from Britain and the export of furs by cart brigades between St. Paul and Georgetown, and by the steamship International between Georgetown and the Red River Settlement.

The creation of the province of Manitoba from the former Rupert's Land in 1870 marked the end of the HBC trade monopoly. In 1872 Kittson joined up with another former competitor, James Jerome Hill, forming the Red River Transportation Company. The line had five steamboats, and Kittson had invested $75,000 by 1873. They were the only operators on the Red River during the 1870s, and were important factors in the development of Winnipeg and south Manitoba through the transportation of immigrants, mail and supplies.

== Railway entrepreneur ==
In 1879, though in poor health, Kittson embarked on his last major venture. With James Hill, Kittson joined forces with Hudson's Bay Company representative Donald Alexander Smith and Montreal banker George Stephen to purchase the struggling Saint Paul and Pacific Railroad, reorganizing it into the St. Paul, Minneapolis and Manitoba Railway. It established the first rail link between St. Boniface and St. Paul. In 1880, its net worth was $728,000; in 1885 it was $25,000,000. When Kittson sold his shares in the company in 1881, it made him a very wealthy man, running his investments into the millions. These same men later formed the nucleus of a syndicate established in 1880 that built the Canadian Pacific Railway and Great Northern Railway.

== Thoroughbred racing ==
Norman Kittson was possessed of "a sartorial elegance and a love of race horses," and it was this latter interest on which he concentrated after retiring from business. His stables at Midway Park, St. Paul and at Erdenheim Farm near Philadelphia, kept some of the finest thoroughbreds and made him one of the most prominent race horse owners in the country. His filly, Glidelia, won the 1880 Alabama Stakes. In 1882, with his brother, James, they had purchased Aristides Welch's renowned stud farm at Erdenheim, Pennsylvania, and the bulk of its bloodstock at Chestnut Hill for $100,000. In 1884, the Kittson's colt, Rataplan, won the prestigious Travers Stakes at the Saratoga Race Course. Kittson's sons, Louis and James, were both well-known horsemen and managed Erdenheim after their father's death. They sold the studs at auction in 1896.

== Family ==
Norman Kittson was married three times. His first wife was Élise Marion (1831–1868), a Métis from the Red River Colony. She was a daughter of blacksmith Narcisse Marion and the sister of Roger Marion (1846–1920), a conservative Member of Parliament. Kittson had many friends among the Red River Métis, including a first cousin, Ambrose Lépine, who was an associate of Louis Riel. The Marion family, however, opposed Riel's Red River Rebellion. When Élise died in 1868, Kittson took her body back to St. Boniface for burial among her family and childhood friends. He then married Sophia Perret (1817–1889), a Swiss woman who was the daughter of Abraham Perret (also sometimes spelled Perry). He later married Mary Cochrane (1842–1886). Kittson fathered nine children by his three wives.

Kittson died May 10, 1888 in a dining car after ordering dinner while he was traveling on the Chicago and North Western Railway towards St. Paul. It was said of him that "he gave willingly but not ostentatiously to charitable causes." Kittson left an estate of over 1.2 million dollars to be divided among his children. There was a claim against his estate by a woman named Margaret Robinson, who declared that she had been married to Norman Kittson in 1833, as shown on a marriage certificate she produced. However, her claim for a third of the estate was denied, as neither the locale nor the state (Wisconsin) where the marriage supposedly took place was then extant, the priest named on the certificate was in Ohio in 1833, and the type of paper on which the certificate was printed was of more recent origin.

== Papers ==
Papers of Norman W. Kittson are available for research use at the Minnesota Historical Society. They include fur trade account books (1851–1853, 1863–1866) and miscellaneous papers pertaining to lands, accounts, and other investments.

== Notes and references ==
=== References ===
- Minnesota Place Names – People Information. Accessed July 16, 2006.
- Gilman, Rhoda R.; Carolyn Gilman; Deborah M. Stultz (1979). The Red River Trails. St. Paul: Minnesota Historical Society Press. ISBN 0-87351-133-6.
