= Knight of Ellerslie =

American-bred Thoroughbred racehorse

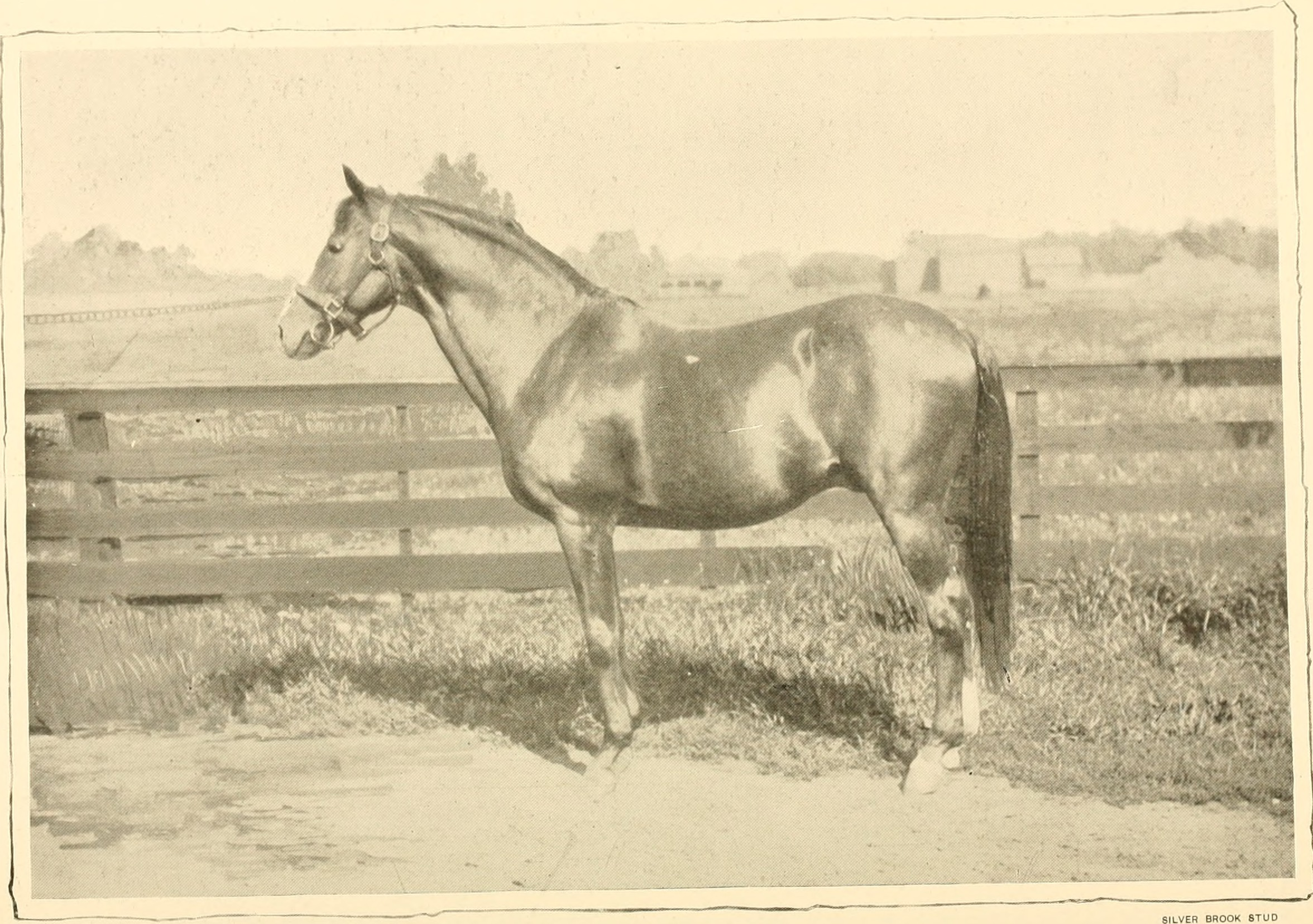
- From The American turf (1898)
- Sire: Eolus
- Grandsire: Leamington
- Dam: Lizzie Hazlewood
- Damsire: Scathelock
- Sex: Stallion
- Foaled: 1881
- Country: United States
- Color: Chestnut
- Breeder: Richard J. Hancock
- Owner: Thomas W. Doswell
- Trainer: Thomas W. Doswell

Major wins
- Vernal Stakes (Pimlico) (1884) American Classics wins: Preakness Stakes (1884)

Knight of Ellerslie (1881 – 1906) was an American Thoroughbred racehorse. In 1884 he won the Preakness Stakes and was second to Panique in the Belmont Stakes. These two important races would become the second and third legs of the U.S. Triple Crown series.

Knight of Ellerslie was bred at Ellerslie Stud in Albemarle County, Virginia, owned by Richard Hancock. He was the father of Arthur B. Hancock, who would have inherited Ellerslie Stud but who later sold it in order to consolidate his breeding operations at his Claiborne Farm in Paris, Kentucky. Knight of Ellerslie was purchased by Major Thomas Walker Doswell of Bullfield Farm in Doswell, Virginia, who trained and raced him throughout his career on the track.

As a sire, Knight of Ellerslie’s most notable offspring was Henry of Navarre, who was named American Horse of the Year in 1894 and 1895 and later inducted into the U.S. Racing Hall of Fame.

Knight of Ellerslie died at Woodburn Stud in Kentucky in November 1906.

== Sire line tree ==
- Knight of Ellerslie
  - Henry of Navarre
    - June Gayle
    - Dick Turpin
    - Don Diego
