= 1875 Grand National =

English steeplechase horse race

- Grand National
- Location: Aintree
- Date: 18 March 1875
- Winning horse: Pathfinder
- Starting price: 100/6
- Jockey: Mr Tommy Pickernell
- Trainer: W. Reeves
- Owner: Hubert Bird
- Conditions: Good (good to soft in places)

The 1875 Grand National was the 37th official renewal of the Grand National horse race that took place at Aintree near Liverpool, England, on 18 March 1875.

== Course ==
In a bid to make the first two fences fairer, the hedges at fences one and two were both replaced. A sketch of the second fence this year shows it to have been a rail and ditch.

First circuit: From the start, the runners had a long run away from the racecourse, across the lane towards Fence 1 {13} Hedge. Fence 2 {14} Rail and Ditch, Fence 3 {15} Double Rails, Fence 4 {16} Rails and Ditch, Fence 5 {17} Becher's Brook Fence 6 {18} Post and Rails, Fence 7 {19} The Canal Turn, referred to this year as the turn for Valentine's. Fence 8 {20} Valentine's Brook, Fence 9 {21} Drop, Fence 10 {22} Post and Rails.

The runners then crossed the lane at the canal bridge, where a table jump had formerly stood, to re-enter the racecourse proper, turning at the first opportunity towards the fences in front of the stands. Fence 11 Bush, Fence 12 Stand Water.

Second circuit: The runners then turned away from the Grandstands and crossed the lane again, following the first circuit until reaching the racecourse. This time the runners continued to the wider extreme of the course after crossing the lane at canal bridge before turning to run up the straight in front of the stands where two hurdles, Fence 23 and Fence 24 had to be jumped

The runners then bypassed the Bush and Stand Water inside before reaching the winning post in front of the Main Stand.

== Leading contenders ==
6/1 La Viene was sent off as co favourite in what was considered by the press to be a substandard field in comparison with recent years. Duel winning rider, Johnny Page took this as his eleventh ride in the race.

6/1 Jackal would be ridden by his trainer, Dick Marsh, who had yet to complete the course in his three previous attempts.

7/1 Congress Was a veteran of two previous Nationals, neither of which had suggested he was a contender to win the race. As in both those previous occasions, he was partnered by Ted Wilson.

9/1 Clonave offered what the public believed to be the best chance of a rider making their debut winning the race when Gavin took the mount.

100/8 Duc de Beaufort was a fourth mount in the race for Captain Arthur Smith, known to all as 'Doggie' Twice he'd previously finished down the field watching the finish play out in front of him.

100/8 Marmora was a second mount in the race for trainer, Jack Jones, whose debut last year on Chimney Sweep had seen him finish second.

100/8 Sailor was a debut ride in the race for Fleming.

The best of the money not going on the favourites went on Sparrow at 100/7, Pathfinder at 100/6, largely only due to being partnered by triple winning rider, Tommy Pickernell, Laburnam and Grand Steeplechase de Paris winner Miss Hungerford at 20/1 and Dainty on 25/1.

== Race ==
There was drama before the nineteen runners were sent on their way when Congress took a heavy and painful looking kick to the mouth, but after a quick inspection, was considered able to continue. Apparently not too the worse for wear, it was Congress who went to the front on the way to the first fence where Furley refused and Messager fell. New York, Clonave and St Aubyn joined the casualties at the second fence as just fourteen runners negotiated the rest of the first circuit without any further incident of note.

Congress had largely led throughout as they crossed the water to complete the first circuit, followed by Victoire, La Viene and Sparrow with a small gap back to Pathfinder, Marmora, Duc de Beaufort, Jackal and Miss Hungerford with another brief gap to Sailor, Bar One, Laburnam, Dainty and Fleuriste as whipper in, dropping her hind legs in the water to give a splash for the crowd.

Sailor overjumped at the second fence on the second circuit, bringing Miss Hungerford down with him. and while the latter was remounted, she pulled up before reaching Bechers. La Viene was in front here with Congress, Victoire, Sparrow and Bar One with Dainty and Laburnam starting to make progress from the rear.

At the turn for Valentine's the beaten tail ender, Fleuriste came down to leave eleven continuing down the canal side with all still harbouring some hope of being involved in the finish. Tommy Pickernell had even considered pulling Pathfinder up going to Bechers but now felt that the weakening front runners gave his mount hope.

Congress took up the running as the runners began to bunch up crossing the Anchor Bridge with Victoire second ahead of the rapildly improving Dainty. La Viene was next with Bar One, Duc de Beaufort, Marmora, Pathfinder and Jackal all still very much carrying hopes of victory. Sparrow was next but under pressure while Laburnam was last and appearing to be in some distress, stumbling badly upon entering the straight where it was clear the horse had badly broken down and was pulled up.

Turning into the straight Congress was quickly passed by Dainty, La Viene, Pathfinder, Jackal and Marmora, thee five being the only ones appearing to have the remaining energy to fight out a finish. Dainty led over the two hurdles but Pickernell wore her down on Pathfinder to clinch his third Grand National victory by a length, La Viene was three lengths down and finishing third, just a head up on Jackal.

== Finishing Order ==
Position	Name	Jockey	Handicap (st-lb)	SP	Distance	Colours
Winner	Pathfinder	Tommy Pickernell	10-11	100-6	One length	Purple and white hoops, white cap, purple piping
Second	Dainty	Joseph Hathaway	11-0	25-1	3 lengths	Green, black sash and cap
Third	La Veine	Johnny Page	11-12	6-1 Co Fav	A head	Brown, red cap
Fourth	Jackal	Dick Marsh	11-11	6-1 Co Fav		Blue, black cap
Fifth	Marmora	Jack Jones	11-2	100-8		Brown, blue sleeves and cap
Sixth	Victoire	Jerry Barnes	10-3	50-1		Yellow, blue cap
Seventh	Sparrow	Alfred Gregory	11-2	100-7		Brown, black cap
Eighth	Duc De Beaufort	Captain Doggie Smith	11-13	100-8	Eased and walked in	Purple, cerise sleeves, black cap
Ninth	Congress	Ted Wilson	12-4	7-1	Eased and walked in	White, orange sash and cap
Run In	Bar One	Nicholson	11-4	50-1	Pulled up and when lying 8th and did not pass the post	Cerise, whites sleeves, black cap
Fence 23 {Penultimate Hurdle}	Laburnum	James Jewitt	11-12	20-1	Broke down badly and pulled up	White, blue cap
Fence 19 {Turn for Valentine's}	Fleuriste	Robert I'Anson	11-0	33-1	Fell	Purple, yellow sash, black cap
Fence 14 {Rails and Ditch}	Miss Hungerford	Gilbert Elliott	11-10	20-1	Brought Down	Blue, white sleeves and cap
Fence 14 {Rail and Ditch}	Sailor	S Fleming	11-7	100-8	Fell	Buff, red sleeves and cap
Fence 2 {Rail and Ditch}	Clonave	Pat Gavin	12-1	9-1	Fell	Black, white sash and cap
Fence 2 {Rails and Ditch}	New York	E. Dalglish	10-13	50-1	Fell	Pink and black hoops, pink cap
Fence 2 {Rails and Ditch}	St Aubyn	Thomas Pickett	11-7	40-1	Fell	Buff, red sash and cap
Fence 1 {Hedge}	Furley	John Goodwin	12-2	50-1	Refused	Blue, black and red quartered cap
Fence 1 {Hedge}	Messager	Whiteley	11-7	33-1	Fell	Brown, blue cap

== Aftermath ==
It later emerged that Tommy Pickernell had overindulged in a pre race drink to such an extent that he allegedly asked one of his rivals, which was he should be facing at the start. Having regained his sobriety to a suitable extent in running, Pickernell actually considered pulling Pathfinder up approaching Bechers for the second time, feeling that his horse was out of contention. However, the pace dropped off to such an extent along the Canal side that all those still in the race were tightly packed approaching the race course for the final time.

Laburnam had pulled up having badly broken down entering the racecourse and despite the vets working for two weeks to restore the horse to health, were unable to do so.
