= Iroquois (horse) =

19th-century American Thoroughbred racehorse

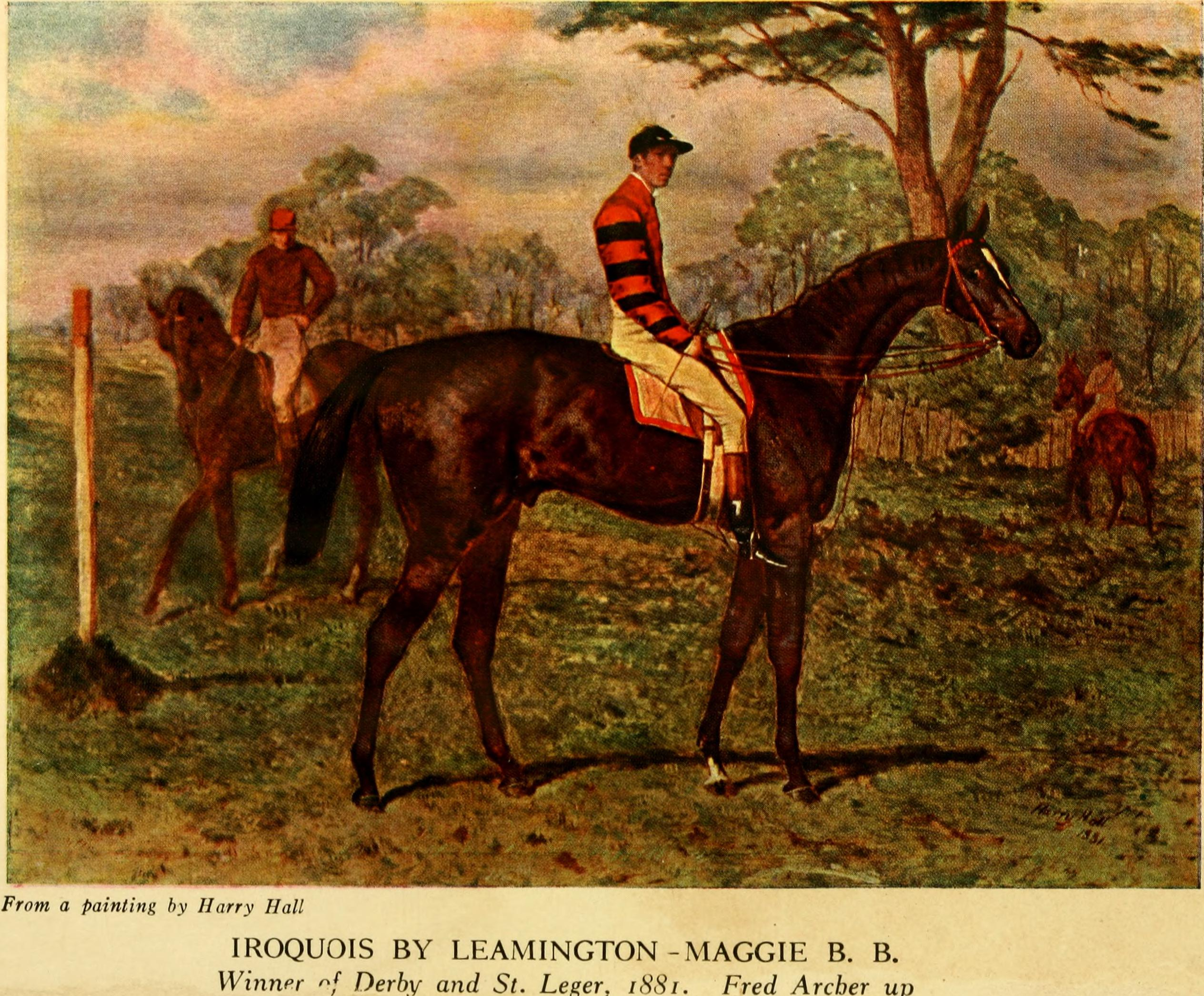
- From Sport on land and water (1913)
- Sire: Leamington
- Grandsire: Faugh-a-Ballagh
- Dam: Maggie B. B.
- Damsire: Australian
- Sex: Stallion
- Foaled: 1878
- Country: United States
- Colour: Brown
- Breeder: Aristides Welch
- Owner: 1) Pierre Lorillard IV; 2) Belle Meade Stud (1886)
- Trainer: Jacob Pincus
- Record: 26 starts: 12–4–3
- Earnings: $101,613

Major wins
- Epsom Derby (1881); St. Leger (1881); Payne Stakes (1881); Prince of Wales's Stakes at Ascot (1881); St. James's Palace Stakes (1881); Stockbridge Cup (1883)

Awards
- Leading sire in North America (1892)

Honours
- Iroquois Handicap at Belmont Park; Iroquois Stakes at Churchill Downs; Iroquois Steeplechase at Percy Warner Park
- Last updated on August 27, 2008

Iroquois (1878–September 17, 1899), was the first American-bred Thoroughbred race horse to win the prestigious Epsom Derby at Epsom Downs Racecourse, Epsom, Surrey, England. He then went on to win the St. Leger Stakes at Doncaster Racecourse.

== Background ==
Sired by the notable stallion Leamington, he was bred in Pennsylvania by the wealthy stockman, Aristides Welch (the man the winner of the first Kentucky Derby was named for Aristides) and foaled on his Erdenheim Stud farm. His dam was the mare Maggie B. B. by Australian. Aside from Iroquois, she foaled Harold, a full brother to Iroquois, who won the 1879 Preakness Stakes, and Panique, winner of the 1884 Belmont Stakes. Her sire, Australian (who founded the Fair Play sire line), was by West Australian, the first winner of the British Triple Crown.

Another millionaire, Pierre Lorillard IV of the tobacco and snuff family fame, loved the progeny of Leamington so much that in 1879 he bought every Leamington yearling the breeder Aristides Welch had on offer. One of the yearlings he brought home to his Rancocas Stable in Jobstown, New Jersey was Iroquois.

Once before, in 1878, Pierre Lorillard had sent a number of yearlings to England in the hopes of an American horse winning an important English race. The first group included Duke of Magenta and Parole. Due to Parole's sensational wins, that effort proved so successful that in 1880, he sent a second group, including Iroquois. In England, Lorillard's horses were trained by Jacob Pincus at Newmarket. Pincus was an American who trained for Lorillard and was sent to England with the second wave of Lorillard's horses.

== Racing career ==
Iroquois was not particularly tall for a Thoroughbred, maturing at 15.2^{-1}/_{2} hands (61.5 inches, 156 cm). Though he matured slowly, he won four of his two-year-old races that he ran on British soil.

In his first race as a three-year-old, Iroquois placed in the 2,000 Guineas. Most horseman (including Sam Hildreth) said he wasn't quite himself at the time. Even so, England's champion jockey, Fred Archer (called "The Tin Man"), was there that day and asked for the mount in the Epsom Derby even though he was contracted to ride the horses of Lord Falmouth. Lord Falmouth allowed Archer to ride the American horse. Iroquois and Archer (in the cherry and black colors of Lorillard) beat the favorite, Peregrine, by a neck on June 1, 1881. (Peregrine had won the 2,000 Guineas.) Archer retained the mount on Iroquois for the St. Leger on September 14, 1881. They won against a field of fourteen. Iroquois' victory made him a byword in the United States; there was an immediate upswing in American racetrack attendance.

Iroquois raced seven times as a three-year-old, winning five. As a winner of the Derby and the St. Leger, if Iroquois had won the 2,000 Guineas instead of coming in second, he would have taken England's Triple Crown.

When Iroquois was four he became a "bleeder," meaning that he bled from his nose when making the kind of effort a racehorse must make to be a successful contender. He also became difficult to train, probably because of this. Therefore, he did not run at four. Lorillard sent him back to the United States in July 1883.

Home again, Iroquois won the Stockbridge Cup, placed in the Hardwicke Stakes and came in third in the Monmouth Stakes.

== Stud record ==
In 1886, Iroquois was purchased by William Hicks Jackson, a former Confederate Civil War general to stand stud at Belle Meade, a thoroughbred horse farm. The horse was transported to the Belle Meade farm near Nashville. Iroquois did well at stud, becoming the leading sire of 1892. Among his notable offspring was the stakes winner Tammany, retrospective American Horse of the Year for 1892.

Iroquois died at the age of twenty-two on September 17, 1899.

== Sire line tree ==
- Iroquois
  - Cayuga
    - Parachute
      - Pebbles
  - Huron
  - Tammany
  - G W Johnson
    - Lieutenant Gibson

== See also ==
- List of racehorses
