= Panique (horse) =

American-bred Thoroughbred racehorse

- Sire: Alarm
- Grandsire: Eclipse
- Dam: Maggie B. B.
- Damsire: Australian
- Sex: Stallion
- Foaled: 1881
- Country: United States
- Breeder: Aristides Welch
- Owner: Dwyer Brothers
- Trainer: James G. Rowe Sr.
- Earnings: $63,875

Major wins
- Saratoga Stakes (1883); Withers Stakes (1884); Triple Crown wins: Belmont Stakes (1884)
- Last updated on March 5, 2022

Panique (1881–1895) was an American Thoroughbred racehorse best known for winning the 1884 Belmont Stakes.

== Background ==
Panique was bred at Erdenheim Farm in Pennsylvania by Aristides Welch. His dam was Maggie B. B., a daughter of leading sire Australian who had already given birth to two stakes winners. His sire was Alarm.

== Racing career ==
As a two-year-old, Panique won the Saratoga Stakes, and came second in the Kentucky Stakes. As a three-year-old, he won the Withers Stakes. The Dwyer Brothers, Philip J. Dwyer and Michael F. Dwyer, were so impressed by the colt's victory that they purchased him from his previous owner, Commodore Kitteon, on June 5, the night before the Belmont, for $14,000. The following day, Panique went into the Belmont the favorite. Another strong competitor in the race, Knight of Ellersie, had been off his feed and coughing in the days before the race. Panique ended up winning the race, beating out Knight of Ellersie by a neck. The race was called "the grandest Belmont ever run".

After his victory in the Belmont, Panique did not show the same skill he had previously. He came third in the Kenner Stakes, but was known as an inconsistent horse. He was later sold for a much smaller sum than the Dwyers had originally paid for him.

== Later life ==
In 1885, Panique broke down during a race, ending his racing career. He started to become better known for his aggressive behavior than his prior accomplishments in racing. At some point, he ended up in the hands of Oscar Rudolph Gleason, a renowned horse trainer who specialized in dealing with particularly unruly horses. Gleason agreed with the assessment that Panique was "the worst stallion ever handled in the city of New York".

Panique died in the spring of 1895.

== Pedigree ==
Pedigree of Panique
Sire Alarm 1869	Eclipse 1855	Orlando	Touchstone*
Sire Alarm 1869	Eclipse 1855	Orlando	Vulture
Sire Alarm 1869	Eclipse 1855	Gaze	Bay Middleton
Sire Alarm 1869	Eclipse 1855	Gaze	Flycatcher
Sire Alarm 1869	Maud 1859	Stockwell	The Baron
Sire Alarm 1869	Maud 1859	Stockwell	Pocahontas*
Sire Alarm 1869	Maud 1859	Countess of Albemarle	Lanercost
Sire Alarm 1869	Maud 1859	Countess of Albemarle	Velocipede Mare
Dam Maggie B. B. 1867	Australian 1858	West Australian	Melbourne
Dam Maggie B. B. 1867	Australian 1858	West Australian	Mowerina*
Dam Maggie B. B. 1867	Australian 1858	Emilia	Young Emilius
Dam Maggie B. B. 1867	Australian 1858	Emilia	Persian
Dam Maggie B. B. 1867	Madeline 1849	Boston	Timoleon
Dam Maggie B. B. 1867	Madeline 1849	Boston	Sister to Tuckahoe
Dam Maggie B. B. 1867	Madeline 1849	Magnolia	Glencoe*
Dam Maggie B. B. 1867	Madeline 1849	Magnolia	Myrtle

* Panique is inbred 4S x 5D to the stallion Touchstone, meaning that he appears fourth generation on the sire side of his pedigree, and fifth generation (via Mowerina) on the dam side of his pedigree.

* Panique is inbred 5S x 4D to the stallion Glencoe, meaning that he appears fifth generation (via Pocahontas) on the sire side of his pedigree, and fourth generation on the dam side of his pedigree.
