= Ansel Williamson =

American horse trainer

Personal information
- Born: Virginia
- Occupation: Racehorse trainer

Horse racing career
- Sport: Horse racing

Major racing wins
- Jersey Derby (1866, 1873, 1875); Travers Stakes (1866, 1873); Jerome Handicap (1873, 1875); July Stakes (1874); Withers Stakes (1875) American Classics wins: Kentucky Derby (1875); Belmont Stakes (1875)

Honors
- National Museum of Racing and Hall of Fame (1998)

Significant horses
- Aristides, Calvin, Merrill, Tom Bowling, Virgil
- Updated on 2019-10-08

Ansel Williamson (c. 1806–1881) was an American thoroughbred horse racing trainer and a member of the National Museum of Racing and Hall of Fame. He trained horses who won the Kentucky Derby, Travers Stakes, Belmont Stakes, Jerome Handicap, Phoenix Stakes and Withers Stakes.

Williamson was born a slave in Virginia in about 1806. His early horse racing experience came for owner Thornton Boykin Goldsby, where he notably trained champion horse Brown Dick to victories in top races in Atlanta, Mobile, New Orleans and Charleston. In 1864 he was purchased by Robert A. Alexander, owner of the famous Woodburn Stud near Midway, Kentucky. Taught the breeding and training of horses, after he was freed Williamson remained in Alexander's employ. He conditioned a number of successful horses including the undefeated U.S. champion three-year-old male, Norfolk and the undefeated Asteroid.

Williamson was the trainer for Merrill, ridden by Abe Hawkins when he won the third Travers Stakes in 1866. Williamson won that prestigious race again in 1873 with Tom Bowling who would win 14 of his 17 career races.

Following Robert Alexander's death in 1867, Williamson went on to train many great horses including Virgil who was the sire of the great Hindoo. However, he is best remembered for having trained Aristides, the winner of the inaugural Kentucky Derby in 1875. That same year, his horse Calvin won the Belmont Stakes. In addition, Williamson trained horses who won other major races such as the Jerome Handicap and the Withers Stakes.

In 1998 Ansel Williamson was inducted posthumously into the National Museum of Racing and Hall of Fame.
