= Erdenheim Farm =

Farm in Pennsylvania, USA

Coordinates: 40°05′51″N 75°14′13.49″W

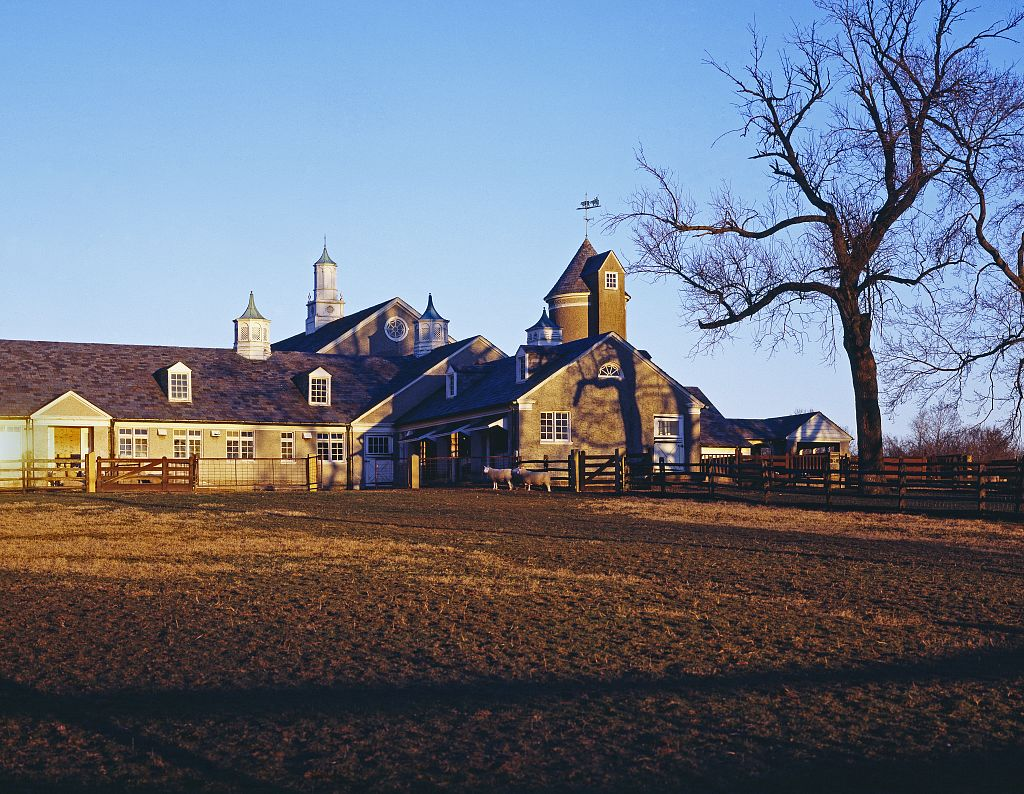
Sheep barn (built c. 1917), Erdenheim Farm, Whitemarsh Township, Pennsylvania. Looking north from Flourtown Road.

Erdenheim Farm is a 475-acre (1.92 km^{2}) working farm in Springfield and Whitemarsh Townships, Montgomery County, Pennsylvania, United States. Located just outside the Chestnut Hill section of Philadelphia, it is bordered by the Morris Arboretum & Gardens to the east, Whitemarsh Valley Country Club to the south, Carson Valley School to the north, and Corson's Quarry to the west. The Wissahickon Creek flows through the farm and Stenton Avenue crosses it. All but 23 acres of the land is now protected from development by conservation easements. The property was listed on the National Register of Historic Places in 2026.

== Early history ==
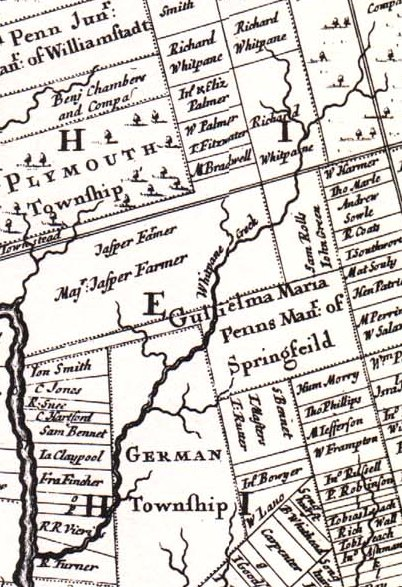
Detail of Thomas Holme's 1687 map of Pennsylvania. Erdenheim Farm is located where the "Whitpane Creek" (now Wissahickon Creek) passes through "Gulielma Maria Penns Man.^{r} of Springfeild" (now Springfield Township).

In 1765, Johannes Georg "George" Hocker (1733–1820), a German immigrant, paid £1,600 to buy 200 acres in Springfield Township west of the Wissahickon Creek. He named his farm "Erdenheim", to mean "earthly home".

=== Welch ===
Aristides Welch purchased the mare Pearl from Atherton Blight, a Philadelphia attorney, and created Erdenheim Stock Farm in 1862, on about 150 acres east of the Wissahickon Creek. Blight bred some of the finest Thoroughbred racehorses in the United States. In 1872, he purchased the British stud Leamington, who sired the champions Iroquois, Harold, and Saunterer at Erdenheim. Welch expanded his land holdings to 280 acres, including the old Hocker farmhouse. By 1881, his stables held more than a hundred horses.

The road to Norristown (now Flourtown Road) forded the Wissahickon Creek at Erdenheim Farm. The circa-1866 construction of a bridge at Lancasterville Road (now Stenton Avenue) led to the closing of the public ford, and the diversion of Flourtown Road northward through the Lukens Farm.

=== Kittson ===
Welch sold the stock farm and its Thoroughbreds to Norman Kittson (1814–1888) for $100,000 in 1882. The property included a 1-mile racetrack, a 1/2-mile track, and a covered 1/8-mile track. To this, Kittson added the Lukens Farm, bringing his land holdings to about 400 acres.

Following Kittson's death in 1888, his estate auctioned off the Thoroughbreds.

=== Carson ===
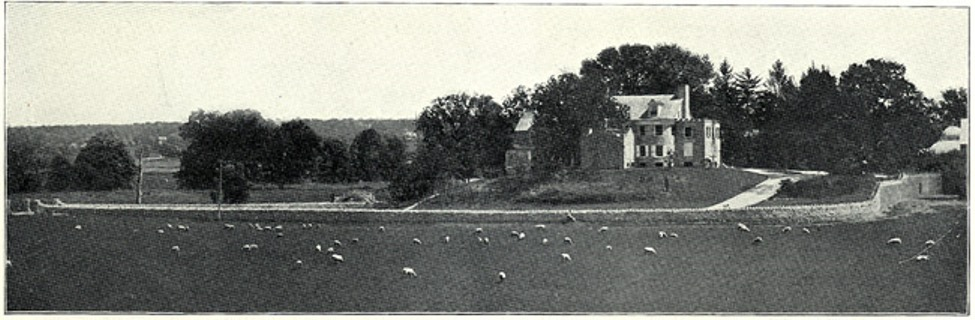
Erdenheim Farm in 1901, looking southeast toward Chestnut Hill. Carson altered the Hocker farmhouse into a "rustic" summer house.

Kittson's son Louis sold the stock farm and the Lukens Farm to Robert N. Carson (1844–1907) in 1896. Carson had made his fortune in Philadelphia streetcar lines, first horse-drawn, then electrified. He altered the old Hocker farmhouse into a "rustic" summer house.

In his will, Carson bequeathed 100 acres of the stock farm and a $5 million endowment to found Carson College for Orphan Girls (now Carson Valley School), modeled on Philadelphia's Girard College for Orphan Boys.

== Widener ==
George D. Widener Jr. (1889–1971), a grandson and heir of Peter A. B. Widener, lost his father and brother in the 1912 sinking of the RMS Titanic. That same year, he purchased Erdenheim Farm (minus the 100 acres that had gone to the girls school) from the estate of Carson's widow. Widener had architect Horace Trumbauer alter and expand Carson's "rustic" house into a 60-room Colonial Revival mansion, "Erdenheim" (1916–17), and design a number of matching barns and outbuildings.

Widener became a major figure in Thoroughbred horseracing, serving as president of the National Museum of Racing and Hall of Fame from 1960 to 1968. His champions included Jamestown, winner of the 1930 Belmont Futurity Stakes; Eight Thirty, winner of the 1940 Massachusetts Handicap; and Jaipur, winner of the 1962 Belmont Stakes. Widener kept his Thoroughbreds at Erdenheim Farm and Old Kenney Farm (now Green Gates Farm) in Lexington, Kentucky. Jack Joyner was Widener's trainer, between 1917–1932, and lived at Erdenheim Farm until his death in 1943. Bert Mulholland began working for Widener in 1923 and was his trainer between 1933–1967.

Widener wed Jessie Sloane Dodge (1883–1968) in 1917. They were married for more than fifty years, but had no children. Upon his death in 1971, he bequeathed Erdenheim Farm and his entire estate to his nephew, Fitz Eugene Dixon Jr. (1923–2006).

=== Briar Hill ===
Widener's cousin, William McIntire Elkins (1882–1947), purchased an adjacent 95-acre tract and hired Trumbauer to design his mansion, "Briar Hill" (1929–30). Elkins's widow sold the mansion on 47 acres to Dr. Stephen J. Deichelmann in 1948, who converted it into Eugenia Hospital, a psychiatric facility. The land along Flourtown Road, she sold to Widener.

== Dixon ==
Fitz Eugene Dixon Jr. raised thoroughbred horses, Aberdeen Angus cattle, and Border Cheviot sheep on Erdenhiem Farm. His horses also competed in show jumping and dressage. He kept the farm largely intact for thirty years.

The farm is divided into five tracts:

- Angus Tract – 98 acres, west side of Thomas Road and south side of Flourtown Road.
- Sheep Tract – 109 acres, north side of Flourtown Road, west side of Flourtown Road, and south side of Stenton Avenue.
- Wissahickon Tract – 113 acres, east side of Thomas Road, south side of Flourtown Road, west side of Stenton Avenue to Morris Arboretum.
- Main House Tract – 23 acres, east side of Thomas Road to Wissahickon Creek corridor.
- Equestrian Tract – 103 acres, south side of West Mill Road, east side of Stenton Avenue, and north side of Wissahickon Avenue (continuation of Northwestern Avenue).

=== Land sales and preservation ===
The Hill at Whitemarsh, established in the early 2000s as a retirement community, bought Eugenia Hospital, intending to demolish it and built a complex of 55+ age-group cluster-housing and luxury apartments. In 2001, Dixon sold about 50 acres of the Angus Tract to the retirement community. In reaction to this sale, a non-profit organization, the Whitemarsh Foundation, was founded to preserve Erdenheim Farm.

Since Dixon's death in 2006, his heirs have sold land in a series of transactions. However, the work of organizations and government entities such as the Whitemarsh Foundation, the Whitemarsh Township Preservation Society, Whitemarsh Township, and public and private foundation records illustrate, that such work—just as the Wideners and Dixons did themselves—along with donations from the McCausland family, do work. The farm has remained undeveloped since The Hill at Whitemarsh's construction. Although 2018–2021 are being executed for Hawk Ridge development in an area where the Agnus cattle used to graze and is owned by the Hill at Whitemarsh. However, given that the large majority of the farm is mostly untouched and preserved in perpetuity since the time of William Penn, the continuation of what the farm is today will live on through philanthropy, donations, and to those who drive by. It is a lasting symbol of what America was and still is, today. Given its location on the border of Philadelphia, it may be considered the "Central Park" of the region to which it is preserved for all to enjoy and exist in its likeness for decades to come.

- 2008–98-acre Angus Tract, sold by Dixon's heirs and The Hill at Whitemarsh to Whitemarsh Foundation for $13.5 million.
- 2009–91 acres of the Sheep Tract, sold by Dixon's heirs to Whitemarsh Foundation for $12.5 million.
- 2009–259 acres, sold to Peter and Bonnie McCausland. This includes all of the Wissahickon and Main House Tracts, and sections of the Sheep and Equestrian Tracts.
- 2009–14 acres of the Equestrian Tract, retained by Dixon's heirs.
