= Aristides (horse) =

American thoroughbred racehorse

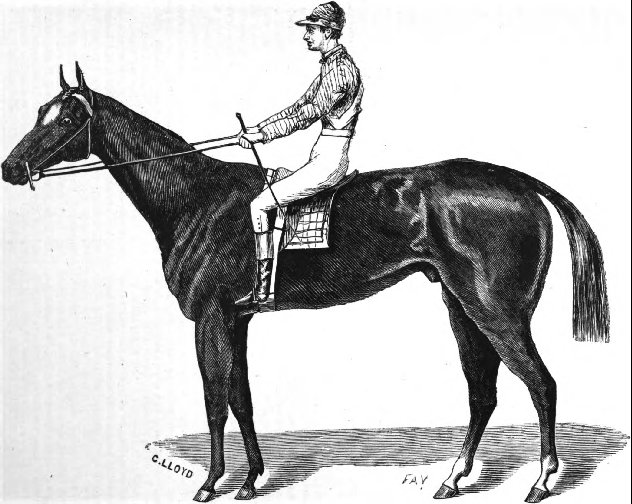
- 1877 drawing by C. Lloyd
- Sire: Leamington
- Grandsire: Faugh-a-Ballagh
- Dam: Sarong
- Damsire: Lexington
- Sex: Stallion
- Foaled: 1872
- Died: June 21, 1893 (aged 20–21)
- Country: United States
- Colour: Chestnut
- Breeder: H. Price McGrath
- Owner: H. Price McGrath
- Trainer: Ansel Williamson
- Record: 21: 9-5-1
- Earnings: $18,325

Major wins
- Jerome Handicap (1875); Withers Stakes (1875) American Classics wins: Kentucky Derby (1875)

Awards
- U.S. Champion 3-Yr-Old Colt (1875) (historic)

Honours
- Life-sized statue at Churchill Downs; Aristides Stakes at Churchill Downs; National Museum of Racing and Hall of Fame (2024)
- Last updated on December 21, 2006

Aristides (1872 – June 21, 1893) was an American Thoroughbred racehorse that won the first Kentucky Derby in 1875.

In 1875, the Derby was raced at a mile and a half, the distance it would remain until 1896, when it was changed to its present mile and a quarter. Aristides also had a relative racing in the first Kentucky Derby in 1875.

== Lineage ==
A chestnut Thoroughbred with a white star and two hind stockings, Aristides was bred by H. Price McGrath and foaled in 1872. He was sired by the great English stud Leamington, which made him a half brother to another great sire, Hall of Famer Longfellow, who, during his racing career, was called "King of the Turf". McGrath did not consider Aristides first rate, though his dam (Sarong) was by one of the United States' greatest sires, Lexington, whose bloodline went back to Glencoe and Hall of Famer Boston.

Aristides (named for his breeder's good friend and fellow horse breeder, Pennsylvanian Aristides Welch, who owned Erdenheim Stud and had imported Leamington into the United States) was foaled late in the season and was small, never standing taller than about 15 hands. His stablemate the bay Chesapeake, also sired by Lexington, was expected to do well at the races.

Price McGrath was born to poverty in Jessamine County, Kentucky, and had gone west for the great California Gold Rush. He did well enough to open a gambling house in New York. In a single night, he won $105,000, which allowed him to return to Kentucky and establish a stud farm.

Both Aristides and Chesapeake were born and bred on the McGrathiana Farm in Fayette County, Kentucky, a short distance from Lexington.

== Kentucky Derby ==
=== African-American success ===
Fifteen horses were entered in the first Kentucky Derby, two of them fillies. The track was fast, the weather was fine, and 10,000 people were in attendance. Aristides was one of two horses entered by Price McGrath. The other was Chesapeake. Both horses wore the green and orange silks of H. P. McGrath. Trained by future Hall of Famer Ansel Williamson, an African American, Aristides was ridden by Oliver Lewis, also African-American. McGrath expected the smaller speedball Aristides to be the "rabbit". He was to go out front fast and force the pace so that Chesapeake, considered the better McGrath horse, could stalk the front runners, and, when they and Aristides tired, come from behind to win.

=== The race ===
Just as McGrath had planned, Aristides broke in front and took the lead, but McCreery quickly overtook him near the end of the first quarter. Aristides fought back to lead again, followed by McCreery, Ten Broeck, Volcano, and Verdigris. Chesapeake, meanwhile, was almost the last to break and was not doing much at the back of the pack. As the "rabbit", Aristides kept increasing his lead until there was virtually no chance that Chesapeake could catch up. Aristides's jockey, Oliver Lewis, knowing he was not supposed to win, looked to owner McGrath, who waved him on. Both Volcano and Verdigris challenged Aristides in the stretch, but Aristides won by a length and took the $2850 pool. Ten Broeck finished fifth and Chesapeake eighth.

The Louisville Courier-Journal wrote: "It is the gallant Aristides, heir to a mighty name, that strides with sweeping gallop toward victory...and the air trembles and vibrates again with the ringing cheers that followed."

== Further races, stud career, breeding record and death ==
Aristides, again ridden by Oliver Lewis, came in second in the Belmont Stakes, the race that today is the third race in the Triple Crown of American Thoroughbred horse racing. He also took the Jerome Handicap, the Withers Stakes, the Breckinridge (beating Tom Ochiltree), and a match race over Ten Broeck. He came in second in the Thespian Stakes and the Ocean Hotel Stakes and was third in the Travers Stakes.

On May 10, 1876, Aristides set the fastest time on record for two and an eighth miles at 3:45 1/2 at Lexington, Kentucky. Ten Broeck finished second in this race for four-year-olds.

Aristides raced 21 times with 9 wins, five places, and one show before retiring after an injury in 1877.

After McGrath died in 1881, Aristides was sold multiple times, and eventually purchased by St. Louis businessman and philanthropist Robert S. Brookings. Aristides lived on Brookings' farm in what is now Affton, Missouri.

Aristides died on June 21, 1893, at the St. Louis Jockey Club at what is now Fairground Park in St. Louis. He was sold twice in the two weeks preceding his death. In 1988, the Aristides Stakes was inaugurated at Churchill Downs to honor him. A life-sized bronze statue of Aristides by Carl Regutti stands in the Clubhouse Gardens as a memorial.

== Honors ==
In 2024 Aristides was selected for induction into the National Museum of Racing and Hall of Fame by its Historic Review Committee.

== Pedigree ==
Pedigree of Aristides
Sire Leamington 1853	Faugh-a-Ballagh 1841	Sir Hercules	Whalebone
Sire Leamington 1853	Faugh-a-Ballagh 1841	Sir Hercules	Peri
Sire Leamington 1853	Faugh-a-Ballagh 1841	Guiccioli	Bob Booty
Sire Leamington 1853	Faugh-a-Ballagh 1841	Guiccioli	Flight
Sire Leamington 1853	Pantaloon Mare 1841	Pantaloon	Castrel
Sire Leamington 1853	Pantaloon Mare 1841	Pantaloon	Idalia
Sire Leamington 1853	Pantaloon Mare 1841	Daphne	Laurel
Sire Leamington 1853	Pantaloon Mare 1841	Daphne	Maid Of Honor
Dam Sarong 1867	Lexington 1850	Boston	Timoleon
Dam Sarong 1867	Lexington 1850	Boston	Florizel Mare
Dam Sarong 1867	Lexington 1850	Alice Carneal	Sarpedon
Dam Sarong 1867	Lexington 1850	Alice Carneal	Rowena
Dam Sarong 1867	Greek Slave 1855	Glencoe	Sultan
Dam Sarong 1867	Greek Slave 1855	Glencoe	Trampoline
Dam Sarong 1867	Greek Slave 1855	Margaret Hunter	Margrave
Dam Sarong 1867	Greek Slave 1855	Margaret Hunter	Mary Hunt

== See also ==
- List of racehorses
