= Foxford (horse) =

American thoroughbred racehorse

- Sex: Colt
- Country: United States

Major wins
- American Classics wins: Belmont Stakes (1891)

Foxford was an American Thoroughbred racehorse who won the 1891 Belmont Stakes.

== Background ==
Foxford was bred in Pennsylvania. A. J. Cassatt was Foxford's breeder, with M. Donovan being his trainer. Foxford was owned by C. E. Rand. Foxford is part of the family descending from the Jack of Diamonds mare, with the family being the rare A1b haplotype.

== Horse racing career ==
In 1891, Foxford won the Belmont Stakes, with Edward "Snapper" Garrison as the jockey. Finishing the Belmont with a time of 2:08.75, Foxford won the race after a grand finish by Garrison, winning by a neck over the heavily-favored Montana. Foxford has been noted by horse racing writers as the most recent Pennsylvania-bred horse to win the race.
