= H. Price McGrath =

American sporting-man (1814–1881)

- Born: January 13, 1814; Jessamine County, Kentucky
- Died: July 5, 1881 (aged 67); Long Branch, New Jersey
- Occupations: Thoroughbred racehorse owner & breeder, Industrial hemp manufacturer
- Parent: Terrence McGrath

Henry Price McGrath (January 13, 1814 - July 5, 1881) was a "sporting-man" who opened the first gambling house in the American South, and bred the race horse, Aristides, the winner of the first Kentucky Derby in 1875. In the 905 page book prepared by Dr. Robert Peter, Professor of Chemistry at the Agricultural and Mechanical College and Chemist to the Kentucky Geological Survey, that was published in 1882 under the title Fayette County, Kentucky With An Outline Sketch of the Blue Grass Region, the biographical section dedicated to Henry Price McGrath called him the "first turfman America has produced".

== Life ==
McGrath was born in Jessamine County, Kentucky. His father was a tailor and taught his son the trade, but McGrath sought looked to the business world to seek his fortune. He travelled about the American South and West. In 1852, he opened the first gambling house in the South, at New Orleans, Louisiana. He and his partners conducted pools, finally having to charge $10 a head to enter the house. With the wealth he accumulated, McGrath bought 500 acres near Lexington, Kentucky. This land became one of the great stock farms in the United States and was called "McGrathiana." McGrath conducted his business honestly and openly, always backed his own horses, and died with an estate worth $200,000.

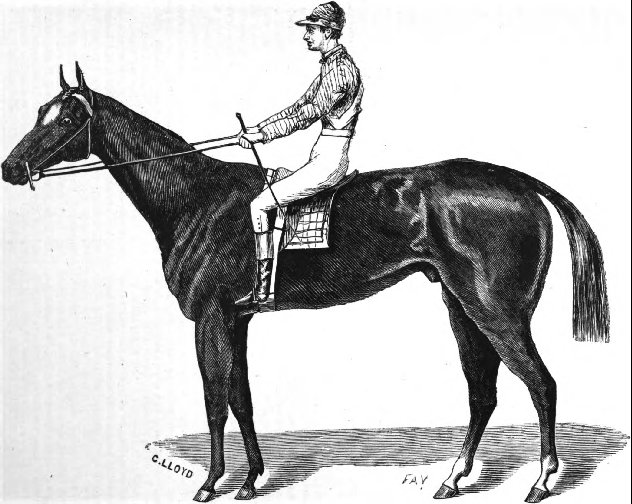
McGrath's Aristides in 1877
