= 2026 Road to the Kentucky Derby =

Thoroughbred horse racing series

The 2026 Road to the Kentucky Derby was a series of races through which horses qualified for the 2026 Kentucky Derby, which was held on May 2. The field for the Derby was limited to 20 horses, with up to four 'also eligibles' in case of a late withdrawal from the field. There were three separate paths for horses to take to qualify for the Derby: the main Road consisting of races in North America, the Japan Road consisting of four races in Japan, and the Euro/MidEast road consisting of ten races in England, Ireland, United Arab Emirates and France. The top five finishers in the specified races received points, with higher points awarded in the major prep races in March and April. Earnings in non-restricted stakes races acted as a tie breaker.

For 2026, the main Road to the Kentucky Derby resembled the 2025 Road to the Kentucky Derby, consisting of 36 races, with 20 races for the Kentucky Derby Prep Season and 16 races for the Kentucky Derby Championship Season without any changes: (Note: See the following list for details)

The following changes were introduced to the Euro/Mideast Road to the Kentucky Derby with three new events were added:

- The Group 3 UAE 2000 Guineas
- The Group 3 Saudi Derby
- The Listed Dubai Road to the Kentucky Derby Stakes (formerly the Al Bastakiya)

With the addition of more qualifying events the top two qualifiers gained a place in the starting field.

== Standings ==
The following table shows the points earned in the eligible races for the main series. Entrants that have been nominated are ranked in the standings.

As of 6 May 2026

Rank	Horse	Points	Earnings (Note: Earnings from non-restricted stakes prior to the running of the Kentucky Derby serve as a tie-breaker.)	Trainer	Owner	Ref
1	Commandment	150	$943,020	Brad H. Cox	Wathnan Racing	
2	Further Ado	135	$1,068,095	Brad H. Cox	Spendthrift Farm	
3	Renegade	125	$1,002,500	Todd A. Pletcher	Robert & Lawana Low & Repole Stable	
4	So Happy	115	$444,000	Mark Glatt	Norman Stables & Saints or Sinners	
5 - scratched (Note: Fulleffort was scratched from the event on Thursday, April 30, two days before the event after returning from a workout and "off" in his left hind leg. X-rays reaveal a small bone chip.)	Fulleffort	110	$507,900	Brad H. Cox	St. Elias Stable & Starlight Racing	
6 - scratched (Note: The Puma was scratched from the event on the day of the event with connections indicating some leg swelling caused by a skin infection.)	The Puma	106	$428,000	Gustavo Delgado	OGMA Investments, JR Ranch & High Step Racing	
7 - scratched (Note: Silent Tactic was scratched from the event on Wednesday, April 29, three days before the event after developing a bruised foot.)	Silent Tactic	100	$1,020,130	Mark E. Casse	John C. Oxley	
8	Emerging Market	100	$600,000	Chad C. Brown	Klaravich Stables	
9	Albus	100	$400,000	Riley Mott	Pin Oak Stud	
10	Potente	100	$220,000	Bob Baffert	Speedway Stables	
11	Pavlovian	70	$527,000	Doug F. O'Neill	Reddam Racing	
12 - scratched (Note: Right to Party was scratched immediately before the deadline on Friday, May 1, after regulatory veterinarians concluded that there may have been clinical signs disposing Right to Party to injury should he have run in the Derby.)	Right to Party (Note: Connections of Right to Party paid the $6,000 late nomination fee)	65	$176,000	Kenneth G. McPeek	Chester Broman Sr.	
injured (Note: Paladin was sidelined from the Kentucky Derby trail after suffering a non-displaced condylar fracture of his right front ankle during preparations for the Blue Grass Stakes.)	Paladin	60	$437,500	Chad C. Brown	Derrick Smith, Mrs. John Magnier, Michael Tabor, Peter Brant, Brook T. Smith & Summer Wind Equine	
13	Incredibolt	60	$424,570	Riley Mott	Pin Oak Stud	
14	Golden Tempo	60	$300,000	Cherie DeVaux	Phipps Stable & St. Elias Stable	
bypassing (Note: Connections of Ottinho have indicated that he will bypass the Kentucky Derby in preference for the Preakness Stakes of the Peter Pan Stakes)	Ottinho	56	$267,750	Chad C. Brown	Three Chimneys Farm	
injured (Note: After scratching from the Blue Grass, Class President's connections announced that the colt had developed bone bruising and would skip the Triple Crown.)	Class President	50	$569,700	Todd A. Pletcher	WinStar Farm, First Go Racing & China Horse Club	
bypassing (Note: Connections of Stark Contrast indicated that he would bypass the Kentucky Derby in preference of the G1 American Turf Stakes on the same racecard)	Stark Contrast	50	$439,900	Michael McCarthy	Amerman Racing	
bypassing (Note: Connections of Iron Honor have indicated that the horse will bypass the Kentucky Derby in preference to The Preakness Stakes)	Iron Honor	50	$182,500	Chad C. Brown	St. Elias Stable, William H. Lawrence & Glassman Racing	
15	Chief Wallabee	50	$175,800	William I. Mott	Michael & Katherine Bell	
bypassing (Note: Trainer Steven Asmussen indicated after Chip Honcho's training run on April 25, that he would bypass the Kentucky Derby and aim for the Preakness Stakes)	Chip Honcho	49	$190,000	Steven M. Asmussen	Leland Ackerley Racing	
injured (Note: Connections of Ted Noffey announced that the horse was off the Derby trail after developing bone bruising)	Ted Noffey	40	$1,602,963	Todd A. Pletcher	Spendthrift Farm	
16	Intrepido	38	$290,000	Jeff Mullins	Dutch Girl Holdings & Irving Ventures	
bypassing	Universe	38	$244,650	Kenneth G. McPeek	Four G Racing, Gregg Day & Steven Crain	
bypassing	Grittiness	36	$150,000	Todd A. Pletcher	Repole Stable	
bypassing	Talkin	35	$233,625	Danny Gargan	Reeves Thoroughbred Racing, Pine Racing Stables, Legendary Thoroughbreds, Belmar Racing & Breeding & R. A. Hill Stable	
bypassing	Nearly	35	$220,450	Todd A. Pletcher	Centennial Farms	
bypassing	Bravaro	35	$118,700	Saffie Joseph Jr.	Albert Ciuffetelli, Stephanie S. Brennan, Shining Stables, BAG Racing Stables & Paul Braverman	
17	Litmus Test	34	$429,688	Bob Baffert	SF Racing, Starlight Racing, Madaket Stables, Stonestreet Stables, Dianne Bashor, Determined Stables, Golconda Stable, Waves Edge Capital & Catherine Donovan	
18	Danon Bourbon	Japan	$221,246	Manabu Ikezoe	Danox Co. Ltd.	
19	Wonder Dean (JPN)	E/ME (Note: European/Middle East qualifier)	$725,172	Daisuke Takayanagi	Yoshinari Yamamoto	
20	Six Speed	E/ME	$314,366	Bhupat Seemar	Brunetti Dugan Stables, Black Type Thoroughbreds, Steve Adkisson, Swinbank Stables	
21 - scratched (Note: Great White was scratched at the starting gate after falling over and throwing off his jockey.)	Great White	30	$117,440	John Eniss	Three Chimneys Farm & John Ennis	
not nominated	Crown the Buckeye	28	$73,500	Michael J. Maker	Paradise Farms, David Staudacher & Hooties Racing	
bypassing	Napoleon Solo	25	$286,520	Chad Summers	Gold Square	
bypassing	Blackout Time	25	$237,875	Kenneth G. McPeek	Brookdale Racing, Lance Gasaway & Magdalena Racing	
not nominated	Taptastic	25	$138,750	Steven M. Asmussen	Winchell Thoroughbreds & Stonestreet Stables	
not nominated	Medici	25	$94,950	Richard Mandella	Perry R. & Ramona S. Bass	
22	Ocelli	25	$80,200	Whitworth D. Beckman	Ashley Durr, Anthony Tate & Front Page Equestrian	
not nominated	Vitruvian Man	25	$60,000	Doug F. O'Neill	Glenn Sorgenstein WC Racing	
23	Robusta	25	$41,000	Doug F. O'Neill	Calumet Farm	
bypassing	Plutarch	23	$140,000	Bob Baffert	Derrick Smith, Mrs. John Magnier & Michael Tabor	
bypassing	Bricklin	21	$135,250	Rodolphe Brisset	Imagine Racing	
bypassing	Trendsetter	20	$309,462	Ben Colebrook	Midway Racing	
bypassing	Express Kid (Note: Before January 12, 2026 Express Kid was trained by Wade Rarick and owned by Steve Haahr)	20	$308,800	Justin Evans	Bradley James & Sharon Kleven	
bypassing	Talk to Me Jimmy	20	$135,000	Rudy R. Rodriguez	SEI Thoroughbreds & Rudy R. Rodriguez	
not nominated	Wayne's Law	20	$134,700	Amador Merei Sanchez	Baalbek Corp.	
bypassing	Soldier N Diplomat	18	$258,350	Steven M. Asmussen	St. Elias Stable	
bypassing	Confessional	17	$66,500	Brad H. Cox	Steve Landers Racing	
bypassing	Buetane	16	$212,500	Bob Baffert	Zedan Racing Stables	
bypassing	Secured Freedom	16	$24,000	Tim Yakteen	Leslie A.& Pierre Jean Amestoy Jr. & Roger K. Beasley	
injured (Note: Mr. A. P.'s trainer Vladimir Cerin announced that the horse is injured and that he is doubtful the horse will be ready to run in the Kentucky Derby.)	Mr. A. P.	15	$340,000	Vladimir Cerin	Holly & David Wilson	
bypassing	Solitude Dude	15	$190,470	Saffie Joseph Jr.	Chris Fountoukis	
bypassing	Creole Chrome	15	$48,750	Joe Sharp	Gulf Haven Farms	
bypassing	Stop the Car	15	$39,975	Brendan P. Walsh	Trade Winds Farm	
injured (Note: Trainer Chad Brown announced that Canaletto would be sidelined until the fall with an undisclosed injury.)	Canaletto	15	$35,000	Chad C. Brown	Derrick Smith, Mrs. John Magnier, Michael Tabor, Peter Brant & Brook T. Smith	
bypassing	Brant	14	$364,000	Bob Baffert	Zedan Racing Stables	
bypassing	Balboa (Note: Before November 2025 Balboa was trained by Bob Baffert)	14	$144,000	Brittany T. Russell	SF Racing, Starlight Racing, Madaket Stables, Stonestreet Stables, Dianne Bashor, Determined Stables, Golconda Stable, Waves Edge Capital & Catherine Donovan	
bypassing	Spice Runner	11	$247,426	Steven M. Asmussen	Winchell Thoroughbreds	
bypassing	Carson Street	11	$35,000	Brendan P. Walsh	Ike & Dawn Thrash	
bypassing	Argos	10	$265,160	Brad H. Cox	David S. Romanik, Warren Cheekes, Deborah K. Dougherty, C2 Racing Stable, BAG Racing Stable & Robert Liedel	
bypassing	Strategic Risk	10	$204,500	Mark E. Casse	John C. Oxley	
bypassing	My World	10	$165,000	Brad H. Cox	Robert LaPenta & Madaket Stables	
bypassing	The Hell We Did	10	$95,200	Todd Fincher	Peacock Family Racing Stable	
bypassing	Redland Rebels	10	$89,400	Patrick Biancone	Calypso Racing Stables 2022	
injured (Note: Mesquite was taken off the Kentucky Derby trail due to a soft tissue injury)	Mesquite	10	$50,000	Cherie DeVaux	LBD Stable	
not nominated	Exhibition Only	10	$23,000	Rudy R. Rodriguez	SEI Thoroughbreds & Rudy R. Rodriguez	
bypassing	Start The Ride	10	$10,500	Dan Blacker	Harris Farms	
bypassing	Desert Gate	9	$216,000	Bob Baffert	Karl Watson, Michael E. Pegram & Paul Weitman	
bypassing	Baytown Dreamer	7	$171,109	Paul McEntee	Baytown Partnerships	
bypassing	Maximus Prime	7	$81,411	Anthony Mitchell	Gary & Tiffany Bizzack	
bypassing	Very Connected	6	$42,525	Kenneth G. McPeek	Dream Big Racing	
24	Corona de Oro	6	$38,000	Dallas Stewart	On Our Own Stable, Commonwealth Stable, U Racing Stables, Saints or Sinners, Titletown Racing, Jim Nichols, Edwin S. Barker, Daiel Rivers, John Haines & Dallas Stewart	
not nominated	I Did I Did	6	$30,175	Michael J. Maker	Paradise Farms, David Staudacher, Turman Racing Stable & Skychai Racing	
bypassing	Project Ace	6	$24,750	Dale L. Romans	Albaugh Family Stables	
bypassing	Comport	5	$264,050	Eddie Kenneally	Joseph W. Sutton	
bypassing	Rancho Santa Fe	5	$83,750	Brad H. Cox	Gary & Mary West	
bypassing	Arctic Beast	5	$60,000	Michael J. Maker	Paradise Farms, JP Racing Stable, David Staudacher, Zilla Racing Stables & Jennifer Rice	
bypassing	Blacksmith	5	$50,000	Bob Baffert	Wathnan Racing	
euthanized	Liberty National	5	$45,000	Kenneth G. McPeek	Brookdale Racing & Fern Circle Stables	
bypassing	Lockstocknpharoah	5	$15,000	Thomas Drury Jr.	Ashley Durr, Anthony Tate & Front Page Equestrian	
not nominated	Daneyko	4	$90,450	Edward Kereluk	Roys Mansur	
bypassing	Quality Mischief	4	$16,000	Brad H. Cox	West Paces Racing & Donegal Racing	
bypassing	Cannoneer	4	$12,375	Brad H. Cox	St. Elias Stable & Stonestreet Stables	
bypassing	Schoolyardsuperman	4	$12,000	Chad C. Brown	Hit The Bid Racing Stable & CMNWLTH	
bypassing	Game for It	4	$10,000	Chad Summers	Gold Square, Wynnstay & Chad Summers	
not nominated	Royalamerican	3	$33,000	C. R. Trout	C. R. Trout	
not nominated	Vost	3	$28,875	William Walden	OXO Equine	
bypassing	Provenance	3	$24,000	Bob Baffert	Spendthrift Farm	
bypassing	Enforced Agenda	3	$18,000	George Weaver	St. Elias Stable	
bypassing	Cherokee Nation	3	$14,305	Bob Baffert	SF Racing, Starlight Racing, Madaket Stables, Stonestreet Stables, Dianne Bashor, Determined Stables, Golconda Stable, Waves Edge Capital & Catherine Donovan	
not nominated	Diciassette	2	$75,762	Patrick Biancone	Green With MV Stable	
bypassing	Steel Imperium	2	$54,470	Caio Caramori	LCI	
bypassing	Civil Liberty	2	$54,000	Doug F. O'Neill	Great Friends Stables & Mark D. Davis	
bypassing	Courting	2	$42,500	Todd A. Pletcher	Whisper Hill Farm, Stonestreet Stables and Windancer Farm	
bypassing	Sleepingonfreedom	2	$38,875	Kenneth G. McPeek	Dream Big Racing & Magdalena Racing	
bypassing	Acknowledgemeplz	2	$36,000	Doug F. O'Neill	Purple Rein Racing & Mark D. Davis	
bypassing	Circle Tap	2	$33,000	Dallas Stewart	Willis Horton Racing	
bypassing	It's Our Time	2	$30,000	Thomas M. Amoss	Double Down Horse Racing	
not nominated	Western Man	2	$18,000	Joe Offotler	Bart D. & Sandra A. Howard	
bypassing	Forty Twenty	2	$14,850	Robertino Diodoro	Randy Howg	
bypassing	Nothing Personal	2	$14,438	Gregory Compton	Mag Racing	
not nominated	Star Sweeper	2	$11,000	Louis C. Linder Jr.	Bran Jam Stable & David W. Clark	
not nominated	Freedom's Echo	2	$9,000	Guadalupe Preciado	Nicholas Cammarano Jr.	
bypassing	Global Aviator	2	$7,425	Rohan G. Crichton	Special Aviators	
bypassing	Epic Desire	2	$7,200	Todd A. Pletcher	Epic Horses	
not nominated	Stradale	1	$42,500	Steven M. Asmussen	Kaleem Shah	
not nominated	Way Beyond	1	$14,000	Steven M. Asmussen	Ed & Susie Orr	
not nominated	Ganaas	1	$11,655	Andrew McKeever	Shadwell Stable	
bypassing	American King	1	$4,000	Ruben Gomez	Gary J. Folgner	

Legend:
Qualified for the Derby
Also eligible
Scratched
Injured/Bypassing/Inactive/Not nominated

== Prep season ==
=== Initial prep events ===
Note: 1st=10 points; 2nd=5 points; 3rd=3 points; 4th=2 points; 5th=1 point (except the Breeders' Cup Juvenile: 1st=30 points; 2nd=15 points; 3rd=9 points; 4th=6 points; 5th=3 points)

Race	Distance	Purse	Grade	Track	Date	1st	2nd	3rd	4th	5th	Ref
Iroquois	1 mile	$299,400	3	Churchill Downs	Sep 13 2025	Spice Runner	Comport	Vost	Nothing Personal	Maximus Prime	
Champagne	1 mile	$500,000	1	Aqueduct	Oct 4 2025	Napoleon Solo	Talkin	Universe	It's Our Time	Stradale	
American Pharoah	1 1/16 miles	$300,500	1	Santa Anita	Oct 4 2025	Intrepido	Desert Gate	Plutarch	Civil Liberty	Balboa	
Breeders' Futurity	1 1/16 miles	$642,594	1	Keeneland	Oct 4 2025	Ted Noffey	Blackout Time	Litmus Test	Diciassette	Spice Runner	
Street Sense	1 1/16 miles	$200,000	3	Churchill Downs	Oct 26 2025	Incredibolt	Universe	Very Connected	I Did I Did	Ganaas	
Breeders' Cup Juvenile	1 1/16 miles	$1,760,000	1	Del Mar	Oct 31 2025	Ted Noffey	Mr. A. P.	Brant	Litmus Test	Intrepido	
Kentucky Jockey Club	1 1/16 miles	$400,000	2	Churchill Downs	Nov 29 2025	Further Ado	Universe	Soldier N Diplomat	Very Connected	Cherokee Nation	
Remsen	1 1/8 miles	$250,000	2	Aqueduct	Dec 6 2025	Paladin	Renegade	Balboa	Courting	Grittiness	
Los Alamitos Futurity	1 1/16 miles	$200,500	2	Los Alamitos	Dec 13 2025	Litmus Test	Blacksmith	Provenance	Acknowledgemeplz	American King	
Gun Runner Stakes	1 1/16 miles	$100,000	Listed	Fair Grounds	Dec 20 2025	Chip Honcho	Liberty National	Crown the Buckeye	Quality Mischief	Very Connected	
Springboard Mile	1 mile	$300,000	Listed	Remington	Dec 20 2025	Express Kid	Arctic Beast	Royalamerican	Western Man	Way Beyond	
Jerome (Note: There were only four starters in the 2026 Jerome Stakes.)	1 mile	$139,500	Black-Type	Aqueduct	Jan 3 2026	My World	Balboa	Enforced Agenda	Freedom's Echo	—	
Smarty Jones	1 mile	$250,000	Listed	Oaklawn	Jan 3 2026	Strategic Risk	Silent Tactic	Baytown Dreamer	Sleepingonfreedom	Rancho Santa Fe	

=== Select prep events ===
Note: 1st=20 points; 2nd=10 points; 3rd=6 points; 4th=4 points; 5th=2 points

Race	Distance	Purse	Grade	Track	Date	1st	2nd	3rd	4th	5th	Ref
Lecomte	1 1/16 miles	$250,000	3	Fair Grounds	Jan 17 2026	Golden Tempo	Mesquite	Carson Street	Chip Honcho	Quality Mischief	
Holy Bull	1 mile	$267,500	3	Gulfstream	Jan 31 2026	Nearly	Bravaro	Project Ace	Cannoneer	Global Aviator	
Withers (Note: Originally scheduled for January 31st, the Withers was moved to February 6th due to inclement weather caused by Winter Storm Fern.)	1 1/8 miles	$200,000	Listed	Aqueduct	Feb 6 2026	Talk to Me Jimmy	Grittiness	Ottinho	Schoolyardsuperman	Star Sweeper	
Southwest (Note: Like the Withers, the Southwest was postponed from January 31st to February 6th due to inclement weather.)	1 1/16 miles	$1,000,000	3	Oaklawn	Feb 6 2026	Silent Tactic	Soldier N Diplomat	Buetane	Rancho Santa Fe	Circle Tap	
Sam F. Davis Stakes	1 1/16 miles	$210,000	Listed	Tampa Bay	Feb 7 2026	Renegade	Wayne's Law	The Puma	Game For It	Epic Desire	
Robert B. Lewis	1 mile	$101,000	3	Santa Anita	Feb 7 2026	Plutarch	Intrepido	Secured Freedom	Desert Gate	Cherokee Nation	
Sunland Park Derby	1 1/16 miles	$500,000	Listed	Sunland Park	Feb 15 2026	Pavlovian	Express Kid	Bricklin	Daneyko	Forty Twenty	
John Battaglia Memorial Stakes	1 1/16 miles	$174,835	Listed	Turfway	Feb 21 2026	Great White	Fulleffort	Maximus Prime	Baytown Dreamer	Steel Imperium	

== Championship series events ==
=== First leg of series ===
Note: 1st=50 points; 2nd=25 points; 3rd=15 points; 4th=10 points; 5th=5 points

Race	Distance	Purse	Grade	Track	Date	1st	2nd	3rd	4th	5th	Ref
Risen Star	1 1/8 miles	$495,000	2	Fair Grounds	Feb 14 2026	Paladin	Chip Honcho	Golden Tempo	Universe	Carson Street	
Gotham	1 mile	$300,000	3	Aqueduct	Feb 28 2026	Iron Honor	Crown the Buckeye	Right to Party	Exhibition Only	Balboa	
Fountain of Youth	1 1/16 miles	$400,000	2	Gulfstream	Feb 28 2026	Commandment	Chief Wallabee	Solitude Dude	Bravaro	Napoleon Solo	
Rebel	1 1/16 miles	$1,000,000	2	Oaklawn	Mar 1 2026	Class President	Silent Tactic	Litmus Test	Blackout Time	Soldier N Diplomat	
Tampa Bay Derby	1 1/16 miles	$350,000	3	Tampa Bay	Mar 7 2026	The Puma	Further Ado	Canaletto	Redland Rebels	Talkin	
San Felipe	1 1/16 miles	$201,000	2	Santa Anita	Mar 7 2026	Potente	Robusta	So Happy	Secured Freedom	Brant	
Virginia Derby	1 1/8 miles	$506,000	Black-Type	Colonial Downs	Mar 14 2026	Incredibolt	Grittiness	Confessional	Buetane	Lockstocknpharoah	

=== Second leg of series ===
These races are the major preps for the Kentucky Derby, and are thus weighted more heavily.
Note: 1st=100 points; 2nd=50 points; 3rd=25 points; 4th=15 points; 5th=10 points
with the exception of the Lexington Stakes; 1st=20 points; 2nd=10 points; 3rd=6 points; 4th=4 points; 5th=2 points

Race	Distance	Purse	Grade	Track	Date	1st	2nd	3rd	4th	5th	Ref
Jeff Ruby	1 1/8 miles	$777,000	3	Turfway	Mar 21 2026	Fulleffort	Stark Contrast	Medici	Stop The Car	Argos	
Louisiana Derby	1 3/16 miles	$1,000,000	2	Fair Grounds	Mar 21 2026	Emerging Market	Pavlovian	Golden Tempo	Universe	Chip Honcho	
Florida Derby	1 1/8 miles	$1,000,000	1	Gulfstream	Mar 28 2026	Commandment	The Puma	Chief Wallabee	Nearly	Wayne's Law	
Arkansas Derby	1 1/8 miles	$1,500,000	1	Oaklawn Park	Mar 28 2026	Renegade	Silent Tactic	Taptastic	Bricklin	Blackout Time	
Blue Grass Stakes	1 1/8 miles	$1,237,813	1	Keeneland	Apr 4 2026	Further Ado	Ottinho	Talkin	Creole Chrome	Great White	
Wood Memorial	1 1/8 miles	$750,000	2	Aqueduct	Apr 4 2026	Albus	Right to Party	Ocelli	Bravaro	Napoleon Solo	
Santa Anita Derby	1 1/8 miles	$501,000	1	Santa Anita	Apr 4 2026	So Happy	Potente	Vitruvian Man	Intrepido	Start the Ride	
Lexington	1 1/8 miles	$398,750	3	Keeneland	Apr 11 2026	Trendsetter	The Hell We Did	Corona De Oro	I Did I Did	Confessional	

== Euro/Mideast Road to the Kentucky Derby ==
The Euro/Mideast Road to the Kentucky Derby is designed on a similar basis to the Japan Road and is intended to provide a place in the Derby starting gate to the top two finishers in the series. If the connections of that horse decline the invitation, their place is offered to the second-place finisher and so on. If none of the top four accept, this place in the starting gate reverts to the horses on the main road to the Derby.

The series consists of ten races – In Europe four events run on the turf in late 2025 when the horses are age two, plus two races run on a synthetic surface in early 2026. The last four events are in the Middle East including the Group 2 UAE Derby.

Race	Distance	Track	Date	1st	2nd	3rd	4th	5th	Ref
Beresford Stakes	1 mile	The Curragh	Sep 27 2025	Hawk Mountain	Geryon	Al Haarith	Shaihaan	Port of Spain	
Royal Lodge Stakes	1 mile	Newmarket	Sep 27 2025	Bow Echo	Humidity	Action	Pacific Avenue	Daytona	
Prix Jean-Luc Lagardère	1,400 metres (about 7 furlongs)	Longchamp	Oct 5 2025	Puerto Rico	Nighttime	Rayif	Campacite; Imperial Me Cen (Note: Dead heat for fourth place)		
Futurity Trophy	1 mile	Doncaster	Oct 25 2025	Hawk Mountain	Action	Benvenuto Cellini	Rochfortbridge	Oxagon	
UAE 2000 Guineas	1,600 metres (about 1 mile)	Meydan	Jan 23 2026	Six Speed	Devon Island	Union Security	Lino Padrino	Raajehh	
Saudi Derby	1,600 metres (about 1 mile)	King Abdulaziz; Racetrack	Feb 14 2026	Al Haram	Obliteration	Satono Voyage	Wonder Dean	Keiai Agito	
Dubai Road to the Kentucky Derby Stakes	1,900 metres (about 1 3/16 miles)	Meydan	Feb 20 2026	Brotherly Love (GB)	Duke of Immatin	Lino Padrino	Sary Shahin	Raajehh	
European Road to the Kentucky Derby; Conditions Stakes (Note: There were only four starters in the 2026 European Road to the Kentucky Derby Conditions Stakes)	1 mile	Kempton Park	Feb 25 2026	Hidden Force (GB)	Venetian Prince	Tadej	Utmost Good Faith	—	
Patton Stakes	1 mile	Dundalk	Feb 27 2026	ƒ Blanc de Blanc	Whatchadoin	Redemption Road	Flanker Jet	Outlaw Man	
UAE Derby	1,900 metres (about 1 3/16 miles)	Meydan	Mar 28 2026	Wonder Dean (JP)	Six Speed	Pyromancer (JP)	Brotherly Love (GB)	Devon Island	

Note:

- the four races in 2025 for two-year-olds: 1st=10 points; 2nd=5 points; 3rd=3 points; 4th=2 points; 5th=1 point
- the European Road to the Kentucky Derby Conditions Stakes, Patton Stakes, UAE Two Thousand Guineas, Dubai Road to the Kentucky Derby Stakes: 1st=20 points; 2nd=10 points; 3rd=6 points; 4th=4 points; 5th=2 points
- the Saudi Derby: 1st=30 points; 2nd=15 points; 3rd=9 points; 4th=6 points; 5th=3 points
- the UAE Derby: 1st=100 points; 2nd=50 points; 3rd=25 points; 4th=15 points; 5th=10 points

ƒ Filly

Qualification Table

The top four horses (colored brown within the standings) are eligible to participate in the Kentucky Derby provided the two horses that can be nominated.

As of 30 March 2026

Rank	Horse	Points	Eligible Earnings	Trainer	Owner	Ref
1	Wonder Dean (JPN)	106	$725,172	Daisuke Takayanagi	Yoshinari Yamamoto	
2	Six Speed	80	$314,366	Bhupat Seemar	Brunetti Dugan Stables, Black Type Thoroughbreds, Steve Adkisson, Swinbank Stables	
not nominated	Brotherly Love (GB)	35	$180,704	Jamie Osborne	Jim & Claire Bryce	
not nominated	Al Haram (IRE)	30	$900,000	Abdullah Alsidrani	Sheikh Abdullah Almalek Alsabah	
3	Pyromancer (JPN)	30	$445,736	Keiji Yoshimura	Godolphin Racing	
not nominated	Hawk Mountain (IRE)	20	$233,829	Aidan O'Brien	Derrick Smith, Mrs. John Magnier & Michael Tabor	
not nominated	Devon Island	20	$68,122	Charlie Appleby	Godolphin Racing	
not nominated	Hidden Force (GB) (Note: Hidden Force is ahead of Blanc de Blanc due to more career earnings.)	20	$0	Charlie Appleby	Godolphin Racing	
not nominated	ƒ Blanc de Blanc	20	$0	Robson De Aguiar	AMO Racing	
bypassing	Obliteration	15	$824,250	Steven M. Asmussen	Leland Ackerley Racing, James Sherwood, Jode Shupe & John Cilia	
bypassing	Puerto Rico (IRE)	10	$476,281	Aidan O'Brien	Derrick Smith, Mrs. John Magnier & Michael Tabor	
not nominated	Bow Echo (IRE)	10	$132,683	George Boughey	Sheikh Mohammed Obaid Al Maktoum (Note: Sheikh Mohammed Obaid Al Maktoum died 29 December 2025)	
not nominated	Duke of Immatin	10	$43,568	Musabbeh Al Mheiri	Mohamed Eldubeba	
bypassing	Lino Padrino	10	$41,315	Bhupat Seemar	Suited & Booted – My Future Champion Racing	
not nominated	Whatchadoin (IRE)	10	$1,170	Josh Halley	Carly Halley	
not nominated	Venetian Prince (GB)	10	$0	Andrew Balding	Mr. J.C. Smith	
not nominated	Satono Voyage (JPN)	9	$328,707	Hiroyasu Tanaka	Hajime Satomi	
not nominated	Action (IRE)	8	$76,531	Aidan O'Brien	Derrick Smith, Mrs. John Magnier & Michael Tabor	
not nominated	Tadej (GB)	6	$60,151	Archie Watson	Jinky Farms & Partner	
not nominated	Union Security	6	$39,061	Ahmad Harmash	Mohammed Ahmad Ali Al Subousi	
not nominated	Redemption Road (GB)	6	$0	David Marnane	MRC International	
not nominated	Nighttime (FR)	5	$182,481	Christine Head	Alain & Gérard Wertheimer	
not nominated	Humidity (GB)	5	$141,313	Andrew Balding	Wathnan Racing	
not nominated	Geryon (IRE)	5	$53,404	Ger Lyons	Newtown Anner Stud Farm Ltd.	
not nominated	Raajehh	4	$12,253	Michael Costa	Ahmed bin Rashid Al Maktoum	
not nominated	Sary Shayan	4	$10,892	Doug Watson	Ardak Amirkulov, Shamil Kurbanov, Mamed Kurbanov & Allan Amirkulov	
not nominated	Flanker Jet (GB)	4	$3,355	Robson De Aguia	Giselle De Aguilar	
not nominated	Utmost Good Faith (GB)	4	$0	George Boughey	Middleham Park Racing CXIII & Partner	
not nominated	Benvenuto Cellini (IRE)	3	$132,508	Aidan O'Brien	Brant Mrs. John Magnier, Michael Tabor, Derrick Smith & Westerberg (Georg von Opel)	
not nominated	Rayif (IRE)	3	$96,517	Francis-Henri Graffard	Princess Zahra Aga Khan	
bypassing	Keiai Agito (JPN)	3	$45,000	Yukihiro Kato	Keiai Stallion Co Ltd.	
not nominated	Al Haarith (IRE)	3	$12,637	Joseph O’Brien	Alwasmiyah/Ballylinch/Umm Al Shukhout	
not nominated	Pacific Avenue (IRE)	2	$101,881	Charlie Appleby	Godolphin Racing	
not nominated	Rochfortbridge (IRE)	2	$42,052	Adrian Keatley	James & Scott Fyffe	
not nominated	Shaihaan (IRE)	2	$5,616	Donnacha O'Brien	Al Shaqab Racing	
not nominated	Outlaw Man	2	$0	M.D. O’Callaghan	Chad Schumer	
not nominated	Campacite (FR)	1.5	$86,561	Jean-Claude Rouget	Ecurie Friedrider	
not nominated	Imperial Me Cen (IRE)	1.5	$77,222	Patrik Olave Valdivielso	Yeguada Centurion Slu	
not nominated	Oxagon (FR)	1	$68,852	John & Thady Gosden	Prince A. A. Faisal	
not nominated	Daytona (IRE)	1	$62,230	Aidan O'Brien	Michael Tabor, Derrick Smith, Mrs. John Magnier, Westerberg (Georg von Opel) & Peter M. Brant	
not nominated	Port of Spain (IRE)	1	$9,100	Aidan O'Brien	Westerberg (Georg von Opel), Mrs. John Magnier, Michael Tabor & Derrick Smith	

Legend:
Can qualify for the Derby
Injured/Bypassing/Inactive/Not nominated

== Japan Road to the Kentucky Derby ==
The Japan Road to the Kentucky Derby is intended to provide a place in the Derby starting gate to the top finisher in the series. If the connections of that horse decline the invitation, their place is offered to the second-place finisher and so on through the top five finishers.

Race	Distance	Track	Date	1st	2nd	3rd	4th	5th	Ref
Cattleya Stakes	1,600 metres (~1 mile)	Tokyo Racecourse	Nov 29 2025	Satono Voyage	Don Erectus	Arcadia Cafe	ƒ Every Possible	Ho O Luxor	
Zen-Nippon Nisai Yushun	1,600 metres (~1 mile)	Kawasaki Racecourse	Dec 17 2025	Pyromancer	ƒ Tamamo Freesia	Best Green	Ayasan Jotaro	Cosmo Gigantea	
Hyacinth	1,600 metres (~1 mile)	Tokyo Racecourse	Feb 22 2026	Lucky Kid	Don Erectus	Itterasshai	Boku Mada Nemuiyo	Your Felicity	
Fukuryu	1,800 metres (~1 1/8 miles)	Nakayama Racecourse	Mar 28 2026	Danon Bourbon	Don Erectus	Charlie	Itterasshai	Sunrise Kevin	

Note:

ƒ Filly
Cattleya Sho: 1st=10 points; 2nd=5 points; 3rd=3 points; 4th=2 points; 5th=1 point
Zen-Nippon Nisai Yushun: 1st=20 points; 2nd=10 points; 3rd=6 points; 4th=4 points; 5th=2 points
Hyacinth: 1st=30 points; 2nd=15 points; 3rd=9 points; 4th=6 points; 5th=3 points
Fukuyru: 1st=40 points; 2nd=20 points; 3rd=12 points; 4th=8 points; 5th=4 points

Qualification Table

The top four horses (colored brown within the standings) are eligible to participate in the Kentucky Derby provided the horse is nominated.

As of 30 March 2026

Rank	Horse	Points	Eligible Earnings	Trainer	Owner	Ref
not nominated	Don Erectus (JPN)	40	$257,896	Noboru Takagi	Koichi Yamada	
1	Danon Bourbon	40	$221,246	Manabu Ikezoe	Danox Co. Ltd.	
bypassing	Lucky Kid (JPN)	30	$228,417	Yukihiro Kato	Godolphin Racing	
2	Pyromancer (JPN)	20	$496,606	Keiji Yoshimura	Godolphin Racing	
bypassing	Itterasshai (JPN)	17	$99,154	Makoto Saito	SNS Group Co. Ltd.	
not nominated	Charlie (JPN)	12	$160,955	Takeshi Okumura	Masaru Shimada	
not nominated	Satono Voyage (JPN)	10	$387,431	Hiroyasu Tanaka	Hajime Satomi	
not nominated	ƒ Tamamo Freesia (JPN)	10	$371,765	Yuki Ohashi	Tamamo	
bypassing	Best Green (JPN)	6	$242,388	Junji Tanaka	Guoxin Taixiu	
not nominated	Boku Mada Nemuiyo (JPN)	6	$101,851	Akishi Higashida	Hikaru Odagiri	
not nominated	Sunrise Kevin (JPN)	4	$129,007	Osamu Hirata	Takao Matsuoka	
not nominated	Ayasan Jotaro (JPN)	4	$118,817	Junji Tanaka	Yoshitomo Takayama	
bypassing	Arcadia Cafe (JPN)	3	$82,738	Noriyuki Hori	Koichi Nishikawa	
not nominated	Your Felicity (JPN)	3	$74,316	Naoto Chiba	Yoshiaki Tanaka	
not nominated	ƒ Every Possible (JPN)	2	$118,164	Koichi Shintani	G1 Racing Co. Ltd.	
not nominated	Idaten Shacho	2	$58,250	Hiroaki Kawazu	Miki House HK Service Co. Ltd.	
not nominated	Ho O Luxor (JPN)	1	$59,303	Toru Kurita	Yoshihisa Ozasa	

Legend:
Can qualify for the Derby
Injured/Bypassing/Inactive/Not nominated
