= Golden Tempo =

American racehorse (foaled 2023)

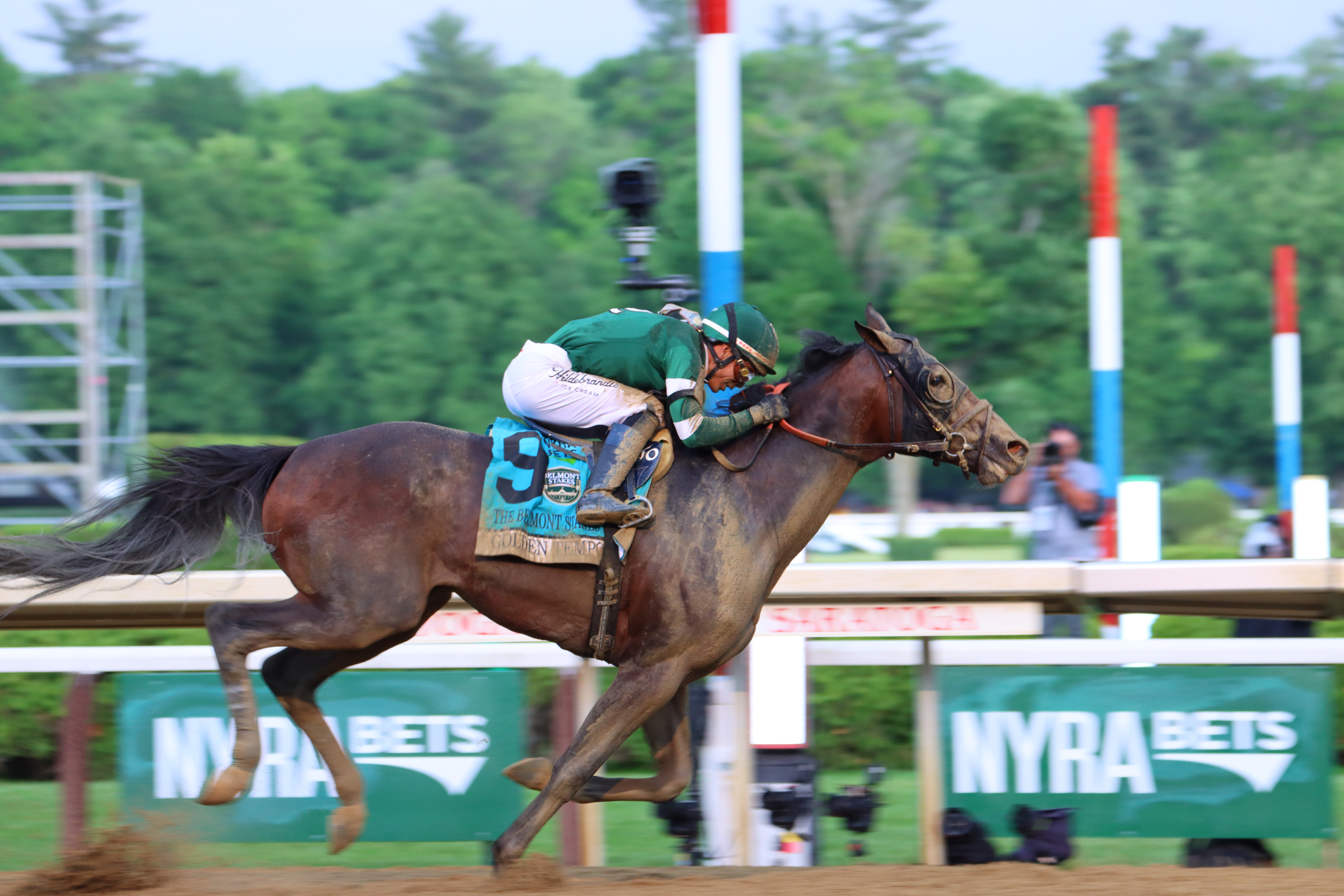
- Golden Tempo and jockey José Ortiz winning the 2026 Belmont Stakes
- Sire: Curlin
- Grandsire: Smart Strike
- Dam: Carrumba
- Damsire: Bernardini
- Sex: Colt
- Foaled: February 7, 2023 (age 3)
- Country: United States
- Color: Dark Bay
- Breeder: Phipps Stable
- Owner: Phipps Stable (Daisy Phipps Pulito), St. Elias Stable (Vincent Viola)
- Trainer: Cherie DeVaux
- Jockey: José Ortiz
- Record: 7: 4–0–3
- Earnings: US$4,783,000

Major wins
- Lecomte Stakes (2026); American Triple Crown wins: Kentucky Derby (2026); Belmont Stakes (2026)
- Last updated on June 6, 2026

Golden Tempo (foaled February 7, 2023) is an American thoroughbred racehorse best known for winning the 2026 Kentucky Derby and Belmont Stakes.

== Background ==
Golden Tempo is a bay colt that was bred in Kentucky by Phipps Stable out of Grade I-placed, graded stakes winner Carrumba. Carrumba was sired by Bernardini (sired by A.P. Indy), whose tail-female line goes back four generations with the Phipps family to Blitey. Carrumba did her best running at one mile or longer, highlighted by a victory in the 2016 Grade III Top Flight Invitational Handicap at 1 1/8 miles. She also broke her maiden at the same distance.

Golden Tempo's sire is Curlin, the 2007 and 2008 American Horse of the Year. He stood earlier in 2026 at Hill 'n' Dale Farms for $225,000 but, due to declining fertility, was relieved of stud duty.

Golden Tempo is owned in partnership by the Phipps Stable and Vinnie Viola's St. Elias Stable. Golden Tempo is trained by Cherie DeVaux, the first woman trainer to win the Kentucky Derby. She is the second to win the Belmont.

== Career ==
=== 2025: Two-year-old season ===
Golden Tempo made only one start in his two-year-old season, winning a maiden special weight at Fair Grounds by 1 1/2 lengths.

=== 2026: Three-year-old season ===
Golden Tempo won his first graded stakes race in the Grade 3 Lecomte Stakes, winning by 3/4 lengths against Mesquite. Following his victory in the Lecomte Stakes, he finished third in the Risen Star Stakes and the Louisiana Derby.

"But when the time came to make history, Golden Tempo kicked into gear and – guided by Ortiz – weaved through the field before eventually overtaking Renegade and the rest of the pack in the final moments of the race. He won, officially, by a neck – a finish that will go down in Derby lore as one of the most thrilling in race history.”

— CNN Sports supervising editor Kyle Feldscher

Golden Tempo won the 2026 Kentucky Derby, ridden by José Ortiz. Before the race, Golden Tempo's odds were given at 23-1. Early in the race, the horse was in last place. When rounding the final corner, Golden Tempo overtook 5 runners heading into the corner's exit, arriving at 13th place before the straight. Deep into the race, Golden Tempo was far behind the leader, but moved forward from 13th place to take the lead coming down the outside in the final stretch.

It was announced on May 6, 2026, that Golden Tempo would skip the 2026 Preakness Stakes, thus becoming the second straight Derby winner to give up the chance at the Triple Crown.

Golden Tempo's next race was the Belmont Stakes, where he won by 1 1/4 lengths. With jockey Jose Ortiz, he again came from behind, beating Commandment and favored Renegade.

Golden Tempo was going to run in Jim Dandy Stakes however, in late June 2026, Golden Tempo came down with a minor illness. Devaux decided to skip the race and enter him in Travers Stakes which he finished 3rd in.

== Statistics ==
Date	Distance	Race	Grade	Track	Odds	Field	Finish	Winning time	Winning (losing) margin	Winner (2nd Place)	Jockey	Ref.
Dec 20, 2025	6 furlongs	Maiden Special Weight		Fair Grounds	2.80	10	1st	1:10.66	1 1/2 lengths	(Fancy Fairlane)	José Ortiz	
Jan 17, 2026	1 1/16 miles	Lecomte Stakes	III	Fair Grounds	2.70*	10	1st	1:44.98	3/4 length	(Mesquite)	José Ortiz	
Feb 14, 2026	1 1/8 miles	Risen Star Stakes	II	Fair Grounds	3.90	8	3rd	1:49.14	(6 lengths)	Paladin	José Ortiz	
Mar 21, 2026	1 3/16 miles	Louisiana Derby	II	Fair Grounds	3.10	9	3rd	1:55.18	(1 length)	Emerging Market	José Ortiz	
May 2, 2026	1 1/4 miles	Kentucky Derby	I	Churchill Downs	23.12	18	1st	2:02.27	neck	(Renegade)	José Ortiz	
Jun 6, 2026	1 1/4 miles	Belmont Stakes	I	Saratoga	6.00	9	1st	2:03.49	1 1/4 lengths	(Commandment)	José Ortiz	
Aug 29, 2026	1 1/4 miles	Travers Stakes	I	Saratoga	2.34*	10	3rd	2:02.98	(2 1/4 lengths)	Leading Change	José Ortiz	
Oct 31, 2026	1 1/4 miles	Breeders' Cup Classic	I	Keeneland	5.70	7	6th	2:01.95	(12 lengths)	Sovereignty	José Ortiz	

Notes:
An (*) asterisk after the odds means Golden Tempo was the post-time favorite.

== Pedigree ==
Pedigree of Golden Tempo, bay colt, February 7, 2023
Sire Curlin (2004)	Smart Strike (1992)	Mr. Prospector* (1970)	Raise a Native (1961)
Sire Curlin (2004)	Smart Strike (1992)	Mr. Prospector* (1970)	Gold Digger (1962)
Sire Curlin (2004)	Smart Strike (1992)	Classy 'n Smart (1981)	Smarten (1976)
Sire Curlin (2004)	Smart Strike (1992)	Classy 'n Smart (1981)	No Class (1967)
Sire Curlin (2004)	Sheriff's Deputy (1994)	Deputy Minister (1979)	Vice Regent (1967)
Sire Curlin (2004)	Sheriff's Deputy (1994)	Deputy Minister (1979)	Mint Copy (1970)
Sire Curlin (2004)	Sheriff's Deputy (1994)	Barbarika (1985)	Bates Motel (1979)
Sire Curlin (2004)	Sheriff's Deputy (1994)	Barbarika (1985)	War Exchange (1972)
Dam Carrumba (2012)	Bernardini (2003)	A.P. Indy (1989)	Seattle Slew (1974)
Dam Carrumba (2012)	Bernardini (2003)	A.P. Indy (1989)	Weekend Surprise (1980)
Dam Carrumba (2012)	Bernardini (2003)	Cara Rafaela (1993)	Quiet American (1986)
Dam Carrumba (2012)	Bernardini (2003)	Cara Rafaela (1993)	Oil Fable (1986)
Dam Carrumba (2012)	Castanet (2006)	El Prado (IRE) (1989)	Sadler's Wells (1981)
Dam Carrumba (2012)	Castanet (2006)	El Prado (IRE) (1989)	Lady Capulet (1974)
Dam Carrumba (2012)	Castanet (2006)	Dancinginmydreams (1998)	Seeking The Gold* (1985)
Dam Carrumba (2012)	Castanet (2006)	Dancinginmydreams (1998)	Oh What a Dance (1987; family 20-b)

- Golden Tempo is inbred 3S x 5D to the stallion Mr. Prospector, meaning he appears in the third generation on the sire side and in the fifth generation (via Seeking the Gold) on the dam side of his pedigree.
