= 2026 Belmont Stakes =

American horse race

158th Belmont Stakes
- Belmont Stakes
- Grade I stakes race
- Location: Saratoga Race Course; Saratoga Springs, New York, US
- Date: June 6, 2026
- Distance: 1 1/4 mi (10 furlongs; 2,012 m)
- Winning horse: Golden Tempo
- Winning time: 2:03.49
- Final odds: 6.00
- Jockey: José Ortiz
- Trainer: Cherie DeVaux
- Owner: Phipps Stable (Daisy Phipps Pulito) & St. Elias Stable (Vincent Viola)
- Conditions: Fast
- Surface: Dirt
- Attendance: 46,128

The 2026 Belmont Stakes was the 158th running of the Belmont Stakes and took place on June 6, 2026, at Saratoga Race Course. The post time for the 2026 “Run for the Carnations” was at 7:01 p.m. ET, 3 minutes earlier due to impending weather.

This was the third time in as many years that the last leg of the Triple Crown would take place at Saratoga due to ongoing construction at the race's usual home of Belmont Park.

The winner was Golden Tempo who was also the winner of the 2026 Kentucky Derby. Winning trainer Cherie DeVaux became the second woman to train a Belmont winner, after Jena Antonucci in 2023.

== Background ==
New York Governor Kathy Hochul announced that the 2026 Belmont Stakes would be the third and final time Saratoga Race Course in Saratoga Springs, New York, would host the race. Due to Saratoga's smaller main track, the race was run at 1 1/4 mi (10 furlongs; 2,012 m), shorter than the usual 1 1/2 mi (12 furlongs; 2,414 m). Belmont Park is scheduled to reopen in the fall of 2026.

The most recent time a Belmont Stakes was held elsewhere was from 1963 to 1967 at Aqueduct Race Track in Ozone Park, Queens, the last time Belmont Park was under construction.

TV broadcast was won by Fox Sports, which was also show on Fox Sports 1 and FS2. Streaming coverage was free on Fubo. FS2 early coverage began at 10:30 a.m. ET and the main channel Fox coverage began at 3 p.m. ET.

The race itself was set to start at 7:04 p.m., also known as 'post time', but started at 7:01 p.m. due to impending weather.

== Entries ==
A field of 9 was drawn on June 1st. Kentucky Derby winner Golden Tempo drew post no. 9 and was given a morning line of 9-2. Renegade was installed as the favorite with 2-1 morning line odds.

== Results ==
Finish	Program Number	Horse	Jockey	Trainer	Morning Line Odds	Final Odds	Margin (Lengths)	Winnings
1	9	Golden Tempo	José Ortiz	Cherie DeVaux	9-2	6.00		$1,200,000
2	7	Commandment	John R. Velazquez	Brad H. Cox	6-1	6.04	1 1/4	$360,000
3	4	Renegade	Irad Ortiz Jr.	Todd A. Pletcher	2-1	1.75	5 1/4	$200,000
4	3	Chief Wallabee	Junior Alvarado	William I. Mott	3-1	5.03	8 1/2	$100,000
5	8	Emerging Market	Flavien Prat	Chad C. Brown	6-1	5.89	9	$60,000
6	6	Growth Equity	Manuel Franco	Chad C. Brown	12-1	13.85	9 1/4	$40,000
7	1	Vitruvian Man	Antonio Fresu	Doug O'Neill	30-1	24.20	11	$20,000
8	5	Ottinho	Dylan Davis	Chad C. Brown	20-1	21.28	17	$20,000
9	2	Powershift	Luis Saez	Todd A. Pletcher	12-1	11.44	23 3/4	

Track condition: Fast

Times: 1/4 mile – 23.96; 1/2 mile – 48.29; 3/4 mile – 1:12.38; mile – 1:37.56; final – 2:03.49.
Splits for each quarter-mile: (23.96) (24.33) (24.09) (25.18) (25.93)

== Payout ==
Pgm	Horse	Win	Place	Show
9	Golden Tempo	$14.00	$7.32	$3.88
7	Commandment		$7.02	$4.08
4	Renegade			$2.52

- $1.00 Exacta (9-7) $55.67
- $0.50 Trifecta (9-7-4) $51.32
- $0.10 Superfecta (9-7-4-3) $23.79

Preceded by 2026 Preakness Stakes	Triple Crown	Succeeded by 2027 Kentucky Derby
