= Napoleon Solo (horse) =

American racehorse, winner of the 2026 Preakness Stakes

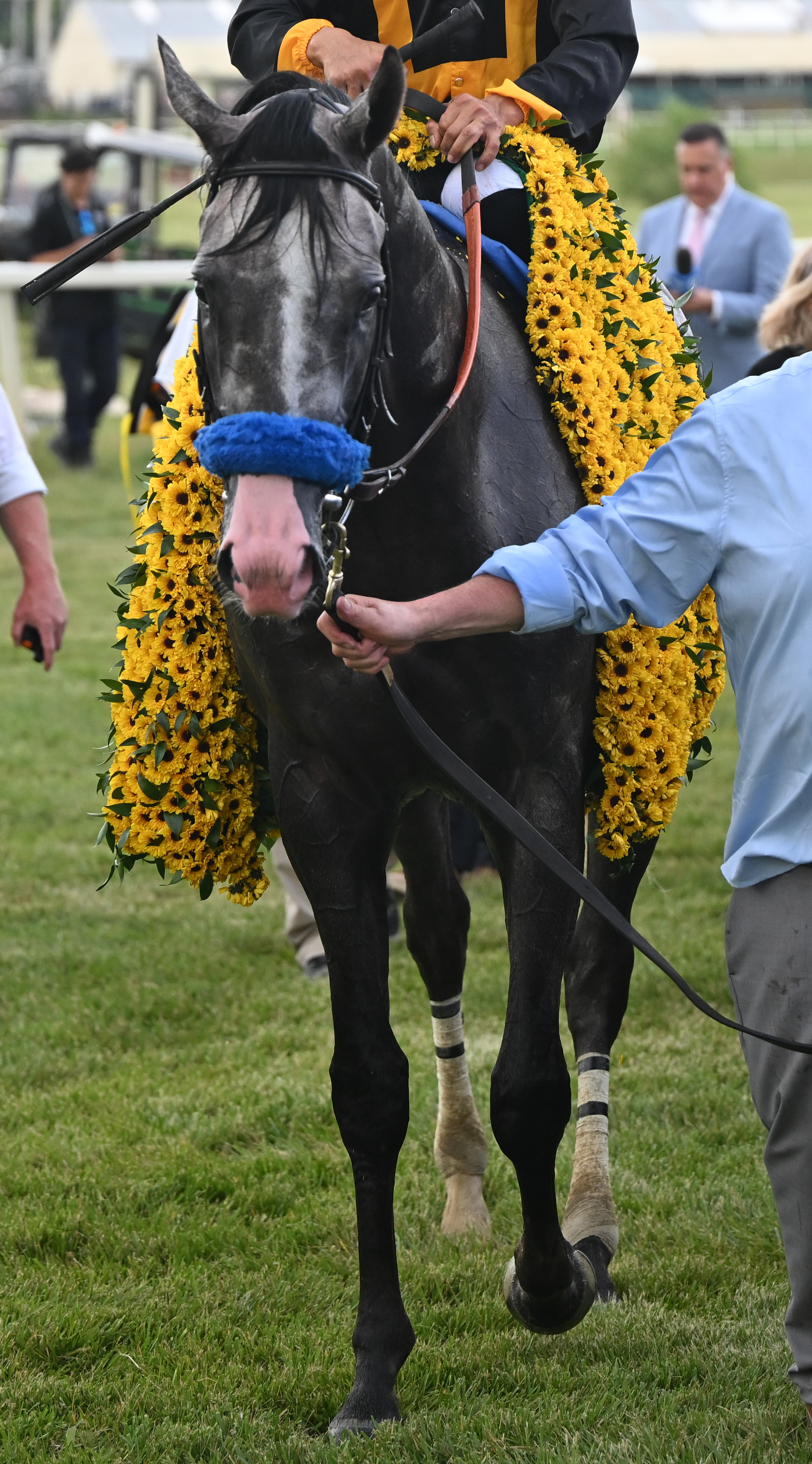
- Napoleon Solo after winning the 2026 Preakness Stakes
- Sire: Liam's Map
- Grandsire: Unbridled's Song
- Dam: Atomic Blonde
- Damsire: Scat Daddy
- Sex: Colt
- Foaled: February 17, 2023
- Country: United States
- Color: Gray
- Breeder: John D. Gunter and Eurowest Bloodstock
- Owner: 1: Gold Square (until May 2026); 2: ESPOIR USA, Inc. (Rifang Zhang) (May 2026–present)
- Trainer: Chad Summers
- Record: 7: 3-2-0
- Earnings: $2,010,520

Major wins
- Champagne Stakes (2025); Triple Crown Race wins: Preakness Stakes (2026)
- Last updated on August 30, 2026

Napoleon Solo (foaled February 17, 2023) is a multiple American Grade 1-winning Thoroughbred racehorse who won the 2025 Champagne Stakes and the 2026 Preakness Stakes.

== Background ==
Napoleon Solo is a gray horse, bred in Kentucky by John D. Gunter and Eurowest Bloodstock. He was foaled February 17, 2023, and is out of the Scat Daddy mare, Atomic Blonde, a winner herself. His sire, Liam's Map, was the winner of the 2014 Breeders' Cup Dirt Mile. He was sold for $40,000 as a yearling to his eventual trainer, Chad Summers.

Two weeks after Napoleon Solo won the The Preakness, owner Al Gold announced that the horse had been sold in a private transaction to ESPOIR USA, Inc. The sale price was not disclosed, and the identity of the person behind the new ownership was not immediately known. Bloodstock agent David Ingordo said that Napoleon Solo would remain training with Chad Summers, with plans to race through at least 2027 before standing stud at Lane's End Farm. It was later revealed that the principal owner of ESPOIR USA is Rifang Zhang.

== Racing career ==
=== 2025: Two-year-old season ===
Napoleon Solo's racing career began as a two-year-old horse in a maiden special weight race at Saratoga. Starting strongly, Napoleon Solo drew off to win by 5 1/4 lengths on the wire. His connections then pointed him to the Champagne Stakes, a prestigious race for American 2 year old thoroughbreds run in early October, traditionally run at Belmont Park but this year run at Aqueduct Racecourse. Seizing the early lead, Napoleon Solo would never be challenged en route to a 6 1/2 length victory over Talkin, who Napoleon Solo would later defeat in the 2026 Preakness Stakes.

=== 2026: Three-year-old season ===
Napoleon Solo began his three-year-old campaign by starting in the Grade 2 Fountain of Youth Stakes at Gulfstream Park after a four-month layoff. While in contention early, Napoleon Solo faded down the stretch, finishing fifth and beaten more than 11 1/4 lengths by the eventual winner, Commandment. His connections chose to keep Napoleon Solo on the Road to the Kentucky Derby after the race, opting to run him next in the Grade 2 Wood Memorial Stakes at Aqueduct Racecourse. However, Napoleon Solo would be beaten again there in similar fashion, getting off to a strong start before fading in the stretch and finishing fifth, this time being beaten by the winner, Albus, by only 2 3/4 lengths.

After Napoleon Solo did not make the field for the 2026 Kentucky Derby, his connections pointed him to the 2026 Preakness Stakes. During that race, he started well, challenging for the early lead with post-time favorite Taj Mahal before pulling away to win by 1 1/4 lengths, repelling the charge of Iron Honor.

== Statistics ==
Date	Distance	Race	Grade	Track	Odds	Field	Finish	Time	Margin	Jockey	Ref
2025 – Two-year-old season
Aug 8, 2025	6 furlongs	Maiden Special Weight		Saratoga	3.50	7	1	1:11.14	5 1/4 lengths	Kendrick Carmouche	
Oct 4, 2025	1 mile	Champagne Stakes	I	Aqueduct	6.97	9	1	1:34.57	6 1/2 lengths	Joel Rosario	
2026 – Three-year-old season
Feb 28, 2026	1 1/16 miles	Fountain of Youth Stakes	II	Gulfstream Park	3.40	9	5	1:45.31	(11 3/4 lengths)	Kendrick Carmouche	
Apr 4, 2026	1 1/8 miles	Wood Memorial	II	Aqueduct	3.57	12	5	1:52.25	(2 3/4 lengths)	Paco Lopez	
May 16, 2026	1 3/16 miles	Preakness Stakes	I	Laurel Park	7.90	14	1	1:58.69	1 1/4 lengths	Paco Lopez	
Jul 18, 2026	1 1/8 miles	Haskell Stakes	I	Monmouth Park	3.60	7	2	1:50.18	(1/2 length)	Paco Lopez	
Aug 29, 2026	1 1/4 miles	Travers Stakes	I	Saratoga	7.95	10	2	2:02.98	(1/2 length)	John Velazquez	
Oct 31, 2026	1 1/4 miles	Breeders' Cup Classic	I	Keeneland	16.52	7	7	2:00.36	(21 lengths)	John Velazquez	

== Pedigree ==
Pedigree of Napoleon Solo (USA) gray 2023
Sire Liam's Map (USA) (2011)	Unbridled's Song (USA) (1993)	Unbridled (1987)	Fappiano* (1977)
Sire Liam's Map (USA) (2011)	Unbridled's Song (USA) (1993)	Unbridled (1987)	Gana Facil (1981)
Sire Liam's Map (USA) (2011)	Unbridled's Song (USA) (1993)	Trolley Song (1983)	Caro (IRE) (1967)
Sire Liam's Map (USA) (2011)	Unbridled's Song (USA) (1993)	Trolley Song (1983)	Lucky Spell (1971)
Sire Liam's Map (USA) (2011)	Miss Macy Sue (USA) (2003)	Trippi (1987)	End Sweep (1991)
Sire Liam's Map (USA) (2011)	Miss Macy Sue (USA) (2003)	Trippi (1987)	Jealous Appeal (1983)
Sire Liam's Map (USA) (2011)	Miss Macy Sue (USA) (2003)	Yada Yada (1986)	Great Above (1972)
Sire Liam's Map (USA) (2011)	Miss Macy Sue (USA) (2003)	Yada Yada (1986)	Stem (1982)
Dam Atomic Blonde (USA) (2016)	Scat Daddy (USA) (2004)	Johannesburg (1999)	Hennessy (1993)
Dam Atomic Blonde (USA) (2016)	Scat Daddy (USA) (2004)	Johannesburg (1999)	Myth (1993)
Dam Atomic Blonde (USA) (2016)	Scat Daddy (USA) (2004)	Love Style (1999)	Mr. Prospector* (1970)
Dam Atomic Blonde (USA) (2016)	Scat Daddy (USA) (2004)	Love Style (1999)	Likable Style (1990)
Dam Atomic Blonde (USA) (2016)	Volver (IRE) (2006)	Danehill Dancer (IRE) (1993)	Danehill (1986)
Dam Atomic Blonde (USA) (2016)	Volver (IRE) (2006)	Danehill Dancer (IRE) (1993)	Mira Adonde (1986)
Dam Atomic Blonde (USA) (2016)	Volver (IRE) (2006)	Chanteleau (1998)	A.P. Indy (1989)
Dam Atomic Blonde (USA) (2016)	Volver (IRE) (2006)	Chanteleau (1998)	Navratilovna (1986)(Family: 2-s)

- Napoleon Solo is inbred 5S x 4D to the stallion Mr. Prospector, meaning that he appears once in the fifth generation on the sire side (via Fappiano) and once in the fourth generation on the dam side of his pedigree.
