= 2026 Preakness Stakes =

Horse race in the United States

151st Preakness Stakes
- Preakness Stakes
- Grade I stakes race
- Location: Laurel Park; Laurel, Maryland, U.S.
- Date: May 16, 2026
- Distance: 1 3/16 mi (9.5 furlongs; 1.9 km)
- Winning horse: Napoleon Solo
- Winning time: 1:58.69
- Final odds: 7.90
- Jockey: Paco Lopez
- Trainer: Chad Summers
- Owner: Gold Square
- Conditions: Fast
- Surface: Dirt

The 2026 Preakness Stakes was the 151st running of the Preakness Stakes, a Grade I stakes race for three-year-old Thoroughbreds at a distance of 1 3/16 miles (9 1/2 furlongs; 1,911 meters). It took place on May 16, 2026. For the first time in the race's history, it took place at Laurel Park due to construction at the race's usual home of Pimlico Race Course.

It was announced on May 6, 2026, that Golden Tempo, the 2026 Kentucky Derby winner, would not run in the Preakness, thus giving up the chance at the Triple Crown. Napoleon Solo won the race.

== Field ==
The field for the race was drawn on May 11, 2026. A full field of 14 was entered, with Iron Honor installed as the 9–2 morning line favorite drawing post no. 9.

== Results ==
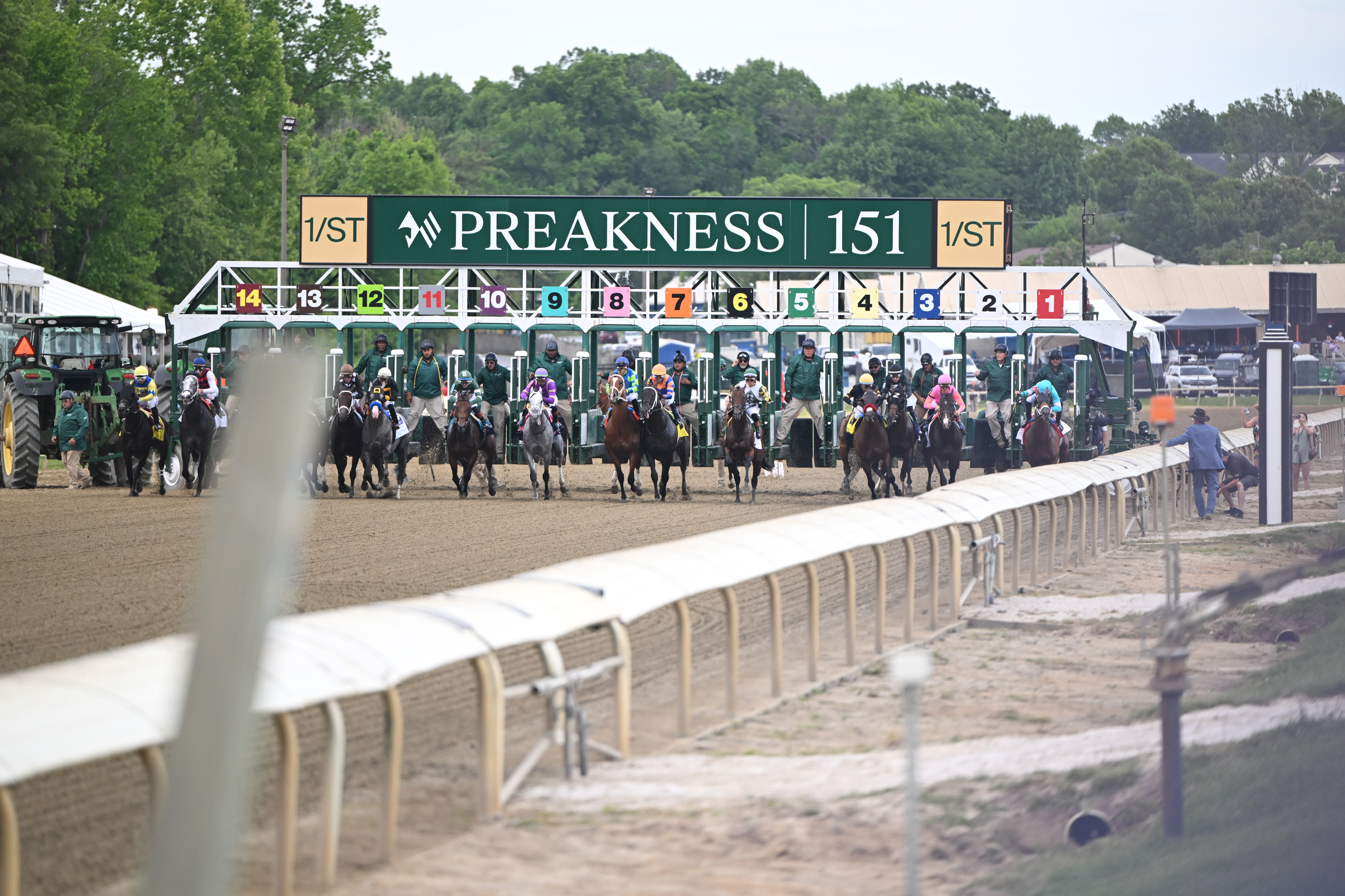
Horses launching from the starting line

Finish	Program Number	Horse	Jockey	Trainer	Morning Line Odds	Final Odds	Margin (Lengths)	Winnings
1	10	Napoleon Solo	Paco Lopez	Chad Summers	8-1	7.90		$1,200,000
2	9	Iron Honor	Flavien Prat	Chad C. Brown	9-2	8.20	1 1/4	$400,000
3	6	Chip Honcho	José Ortiz	Steven M. Asmussen	5-1	11.10	4 1/2	$220,000
4	2	Ocelli	Tyler Gaffalione	D. Whitworth Beckman	6-1	7.60	7 1/4	$120,000
5	12	Incredibolt	Jaime Torres	Riley Mott	5-1	5.80	7 1/2	$60,000
6	8	Bull by the Horns	Micah Husbands	Saffie A. Joseph Jr.	30-1	19.10	9 3/4	
7	7	The Hell We Did	Luis Saez	Todd W. Fincher	15-1	9.20	12 1/2	
8	13	Great White	Alex Achard	John Ennis	15-1	9.30	13	
9	4	Robusta	Rafael Bejarano	Doug O'Neill	30-1	28.00	13 1/4	
10	1	Taj Mahal	Sheldon Russell	Brittany T. Russell	5-1	4.70	13 3/4	
11	11	Corona de Oro	John R. Velazquez	Dallas Stewart	30-1	17.00	17 3/4	
12	5	Talkin	Irad Ortiz Jr.	Danny Gargan	20-1	11.50	19 1/2	
13	3	Crupper	Junior Alvarado	Donnie K. Von Hemel	30-1	29.20	21 1/4	
14	14	Pretty Boy Miah	Ricardo Santana Jr.	Jeremiah C. Inglehart	15-1	26.20	43	

Track condition: Fast

Times: 1/4 mile – 22.66; 1/2 mile – 46.66; 3/4 mile – 1:12.08; mile – 1:38.55; final – 1:58.69.
Splits for each quarter-mile: (22.66) (24.00) (25:42) (26.47) (20.14 for final 3/16)

== Payout ==
Pgm	Horse	Win	Place	Show
10	Napoleon Solo	$17.80	$9.80	$7.40
9	Iron Honor	–	$9.20	$6.60
6	Chip Honcho	–	–	$8.20

- $1 Exacta (10–9) $53.60
- $1 Trifecta: (10–9–6) $597.10
- $1 Superfecta: (10-9-6-2) $2,377.80
- $1 Super High Five (10-9-6-2-12) $12,015.70

Preceded by 2026 Kentucky Derby	Triple Crown	Succeeded by 2026 Belmont Stakes
