= Ted Noffey =

American Thoroughbred racehorse

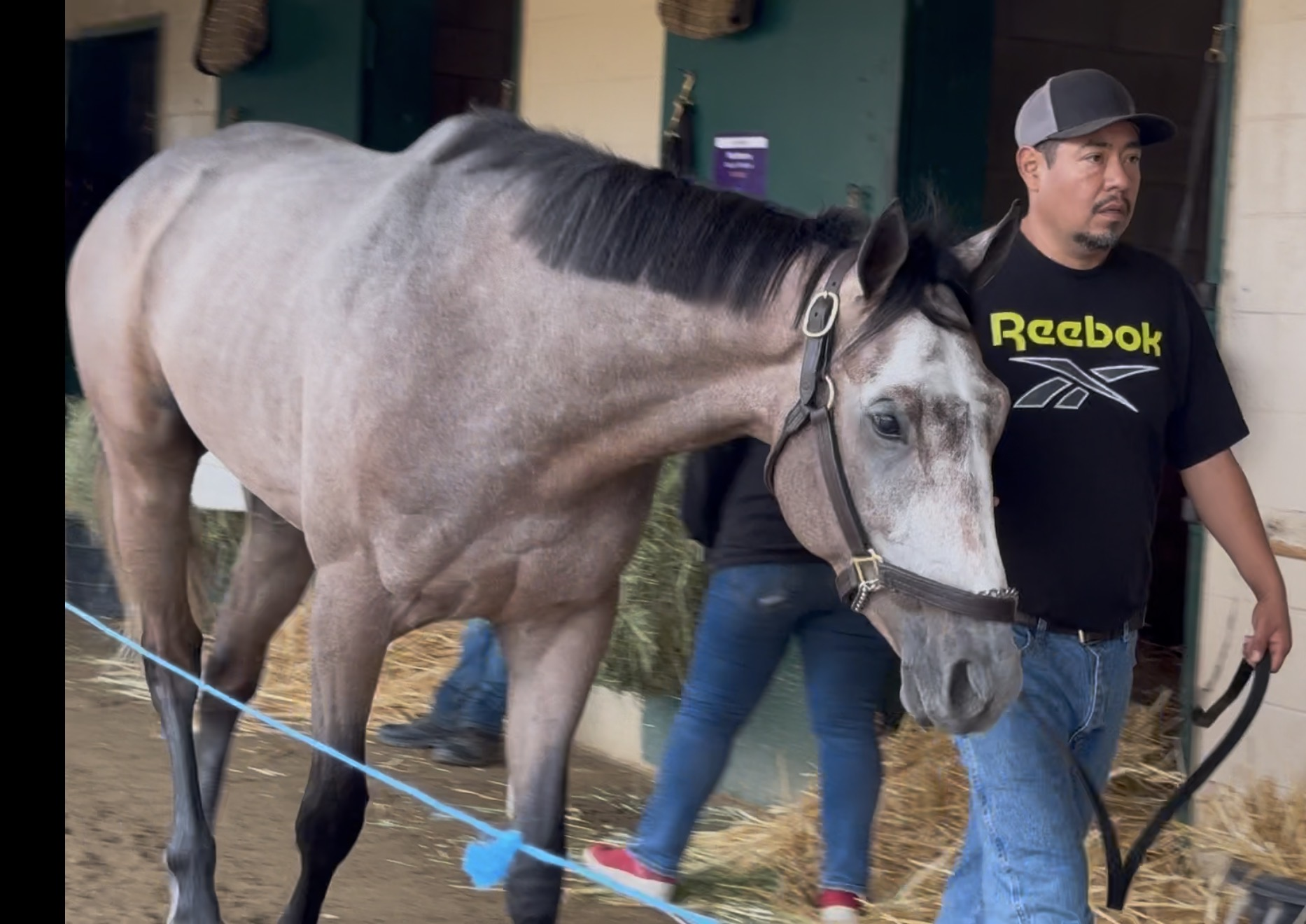
- Ted Noffey at Del Mar in 2025
- Sire: Into Mischief
- Grandsire: Harlan's Holiday
- Dam: Streak of Luck
- Damsire: Old Fashioned
- Sex: Colt
- Foaled: January 17, 2023 (age 3); Kentucky, U.S.
- Country: United States
- Color: Gray or Roan
- Breeder: Aaron & Marie Jones
- Owner: Spendthrift Farm
- Trainer: Todd A. Pletcher
- Jockey: John R. Velazquez
- Record: 5: 4 – 0 – 0
- Earnings: US$1,665,963

Major wins
- Hopeful Stakes; Breeders' Futurity; Breeders' Cup wins: Breeders' Cup Juvenile

Awards
- American Champion 2-Year-Old Male (2025)
- Last updated on November 8, 2026

Ted Noffey (foaled January 17, 2023) is a champion American former Thoroughbred racehorse. As a two-year-old he won the Grade I Breeders' Cup Juvenile, Hopeful Stakes and Breeders' Futurity, and was named Champion Two-Year-Old Male at the 2025 Eclipse Awards.

== Background ==
Ted Noffey is a Gray or Roan colt who was bred in Kentucky by Aaron and Marie Jones. He is out of the stakes-winning, graded-placed Old Fashioned mare Streak of Luck. Streak of Luck finished second in the 2019 Grade II Buena Vista Stakes at Santa Anita Park to Vasilika at 53/1 odds. Spendthrift Farm bought Ted Noffey for $650,000 from Taylor Made Sales Agency's consignment to the 2024 Keeneland September Yearling Sale.

Ted Noffey's sire is Into Mischief, a Grade I winner at the age of two who has been North America's leading sire by purse winnings in multiple years since 2018.

Ted Noffey is named after a transposed social media post meant to describe Spendthrift Farm general manager Ned Toffey. He was trained by Todd A. Pletcher and ridden by John R. Velazquez, both members of American racing's Hall of Fame.

== Racing career ==
=== 2025: Two-year-old season ===
Ted Noffey was undefeated in his four starts as a two-year-old in 2025, beginning with a Maiden victory at Saratoga Race Course on August 2 in his first career start. On September 1, he dominated Saratoga's season-ending Grade I race for two-year-olds, the Hopeful Stakes, winning by 8 1/2 lengths. He then was shipped to run in the October 4 Breeders' Futurity Stakes at Keeneland, which he won by 2 3/4 lengths.

In his fourth and final start of the year, Ted Noffey was sent off as the 4-5 favorite in the Breeders' Cup Juvenile at Del Mar. Ted Noffey pressed the pace early on, and maintained a one-length lead from the top of the stretch to the finish line. He paid $3.60 as the winning horse, which was the second-shortest win price in the history of the race.

For his accomplishments, Ted Noffey won the Eclipse Award as American Champion 2-Year-Old Male of the year.

=== 2026: Three-year-old season ===
Following his championship season as a two-year-old, in late January 2026 the connections of Ted Noffey announced that the horse would be stood down from training for approximately 90 days because of bone bruising, taking him out of consideration for the races leading up to the Triple Crown.

In August 2026, Ted Noffey was shipped from Ocala, Florida, where he had been spending the previous weeks, to Todd Pletcher's barn at Saratoga Race Course to prepare for a fall campaign. He was eventually entered into the November 7 Dwyer Stakes at Belmont Park against other three-year-olds, where he was never a factor and was beaten by 12 1/2 lengths. Days after his defeat, Noffey was officially retired by Spendthrift Farm without a public retirement ceremony.

== Statistics ==
Date	Distance	Race	Grade	Track	Odds	Field	Finish	Winning Time	Winning (Losing) Margin	Jockey	Ref
2025 – Two-year-old season
Aug 2, 2025	6 1/2 furlongs	Maiden Special Weight		Saratoga	3.80	8	1 (Note: Ted Noffey ran as part of two horse entry with Abrigado who finished fifth)	1:17.56	1 1/2 lengths	John R. Velazquez	
Sep 1, 2025	7 furlongs	Hopeful Stakes	I	Saratoga	3.81	7	1	1:22.35	8 1/2 lengths	John R. Velazquez	
Oct 4, 2025	1 1/16 miles	Breeders' Futurity	I	Keeneland	0.92*	6	1	1:43.98	2 3/4 lengths	John R. Velazquez	
Oct 31, 2025	1 1/16 miles	Breeders' Cup Juvenile	I	Del Mar	0.80*	6	1	1:42.25	1 length	John R. Velazquez	
2026 – Three-year-old season
Nov 7, 2026	1 mile	Dwyer Stakes	Listed	Belmont Park	1.79	8	5	1:33.64	(12 1/2 lengths)	John R. Velazquez	

Notes:
An (*) asterisk after the odds means Ted Noffey was the post-time favourite.

== Stud career ==
Three days after he was beaten in the 2026 Dwyer Stakes, it was announced that Ted Noffey would be retired from racing. Spendthrift's Ned Toffey said that he was "incredibly proud" of what the horse achieved on the racetrack. He added: "It’s getting late in the year in terms of having access to the best mares, and he’s a horse that deserves to have access to the very best mares."

Ted Noffey will stand at Spendthrift Farm in 2027 for a stud fee of $60,000.

== Pedigree ==
Pedigree of Ted Noffey, gray/roan colt, January 17, 2023
Sire Into Mischief (2005)	Harlan's Holiday (1999)	Harlan (1989)	Storm Cat (1983)
Sire Into Mischief (2005)	Harlan's Holiday (1999)	Harlan (1989)	Country Romance (1976)
Sire Into Mischief (2005)	Harlan's Holiday (1999)	Christmas in Aiken (1992)	Affirmed (1975)
Sire Into Mischief (2005)	Harlan's Holiday (1999)	Christmas in Aiken (1992)	Dowager (1980)
Sire Into Mischief (2005)	Leslie's Lady (1996)	Tricky Creek (1986)	Clever Trick (1976)
Sire Into Mischief (2005)	Leslie's Lady (1996)	Tricky Creek (1986)	Battle Creek Girl (1977)
Sire Into Mischief (2005)	Leslie's Lady (1996)	Crystal Lady (1990)	Stop the Music (1970)
Sire Into Mischief (2005)	Leslie's Lady (1996)	Crystal Lady (1990)	One Last Bird (1980)
Dam Streak of Luck (2015)	Old Fashioned (2006)	Unbridled's Song (1993)	Unbridled (1987)
Dam Streak of Luck (2015)	Old Fashioned (2006)	Unbridled's Song (1993)	Trolley Song (1983)
Dam Streak of Luck (2015)	Old Fashioned (2006)	Collect Call (1998)	Meadowlake (1983)
Dam Streak of Luck (2015)	Old Fashioned (2006)	Collect Call (1998)	Negative Pledge (1989)
Dam Streak of Luck (2015)	Valeria (2007)	Elusive Quality (1993)	Gone West (1984)
Dam Streak of Luck (2015)	Valeria (2007)	Elusive Quality (1993)	Touch Of Greatness (1986)
Dam Streak of Luck (2015)	Valeria (2007)	Lindsay Jean (1998)	Saint Ballado (CAN) (1989)
Dam Streak of Luck (2015)	Valeria (2007)	Lindsay Jean (1998)	Colony Bay (CAN) (1992) (family: 4-j)
