= Hyacinth Stakes =

Japanese horse race

Hyacinth Stakes ヒヤシンスステークス
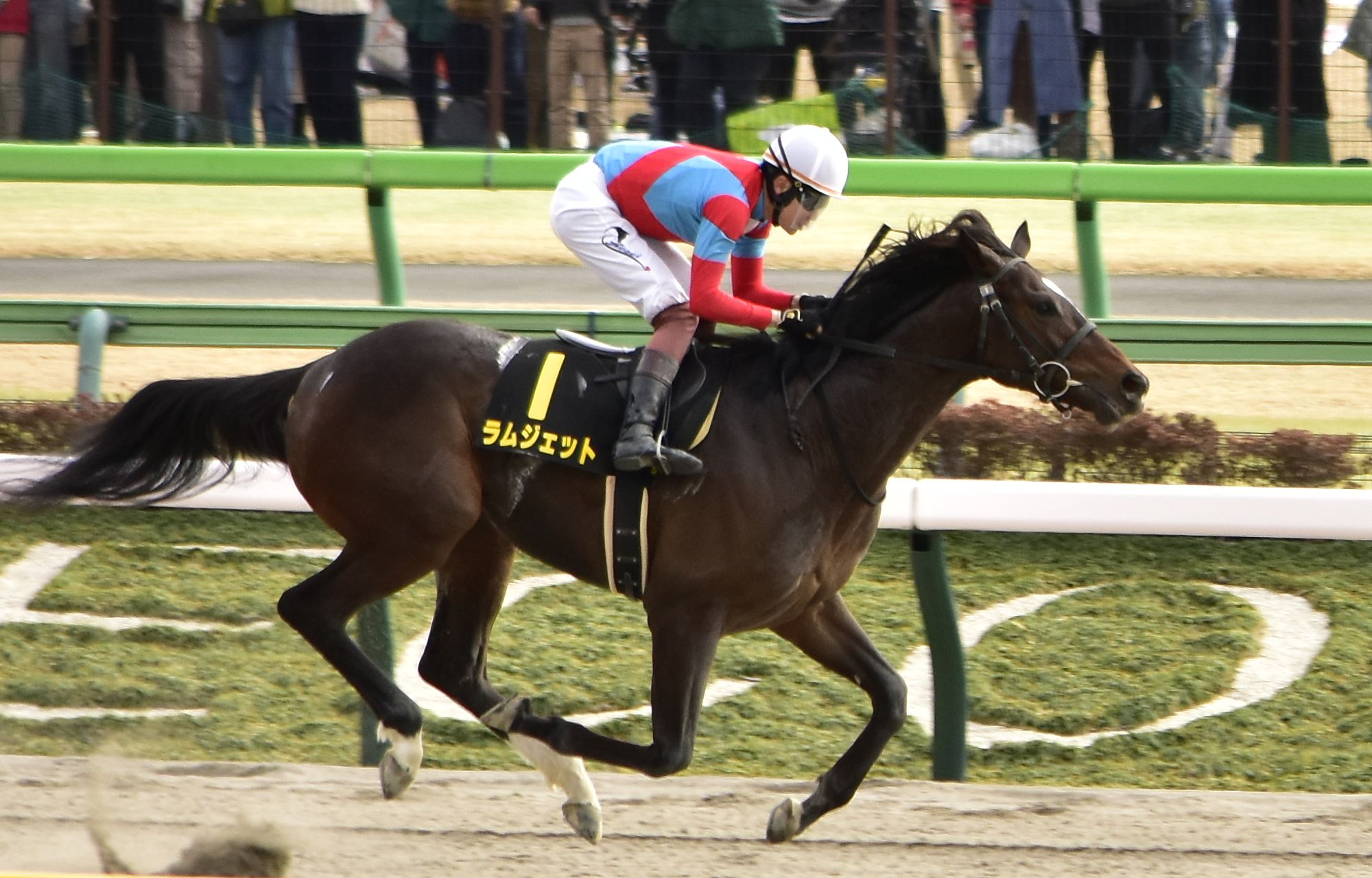
- Ramjet racing the 2024 Hyacinth Stakes
- Class: Listed
- Location: Tokyo Racecourse, Fuchū, Tokyo, Japan
- Inaugurated: 1969
- Race type: Thoroughbred
- Website: japanracing.jp/

Race information
- Distance: 1,600 meters
- Surface: Dirt
- Track: Left-handed
- Qualification: 3-y-o Thoroughbreds
- Weight: 3-y-o 57 kg Allowance : Fillies 2kg
- Purse: ¥ 41,140,000 (as of 2024): 1st: ¥ 19,000,000; 2nd: ¥ 7,600,000; 3rd: ¥ 4,800,000

The Hyacinth Stakes is an international listed flat horse race in Japan open to three-year-old Thoroughbred horses. It is run at Tokyo Racecourse over a distance of 1,600 meters.

The race was first run in 1969 as an open race for two year as the Hyacinth Tokubetsu, before becoming the Hyacinth Sho in 1970. The race became an open race in 1989, when it was changed to a turf race over a distance of 1,400 meters, before returning to dirt race in 1997, where the distance was extended to the current 1,600 meters, except for 2003 when it was held at Nakayama Racecourse over a course of 1,800 meters. In 2017, the race began to be included as part of the Road to the Kentucky Derby series.

== Winners since 2003 ==
Year	Winner	Jockey	Trainer	Owner	Time
2026	Lucky Kid	Mirai Iwata	Yukihiro Kato	Godolphin	1:36.7
2025	Luxor Cafe	Rachel King	Noriyuki Hori	Koichi Nishikawa	1:37.6
2024	Ramjet	Kousei Miura	Shozo Sasaki	North Hills Co Ltd	1:36.2
2023	Perriere	Yuichi Fukunaga	Yoichi Kuroiwa	Yuji Hasegawa	1:37.2
2022	Combustion	Yuga Kawada	Keizo Ito	Godolphin	1:35.3
2021	La Perouse	Christophe Lemaire	Kazuo Fujisawa	Nobutaka Tada	1:36.8
2020	Cafe Pharoah	Mirco Demuro	Noriyuki Hori	Koichi Nishikawa	1.37.7
2019	Oval Ace	Masayoshi Ebina	Noboru Takagi	Isao Nishimori	1:38.6
2018	Sumahama	Yusuke Fujioka	Ryo Takahashi	Sanshisuimei Co Ltd	1:38.5
2017	Epicharis	Christophe Lemaire	Kiyoshi Hagiwara	Carrot Farm Co Ltd	1:37.8
2016	Gold Dream	Hironobu Tanabe	Osamu Hirata	Katsumi Yoshida	1:35.4
2015	Golden Barows	Keita Tosaki	Noriyuki Hori	Hirotsugu Inokuma	1:36.7
2014	Ekimae	Teruo Eda	Tadashige Nakagawa	Tomohiro Furukawa	1:37.5
2013	Charlie Brave	William Buick	Tomohito Ozeki	Masamichi Hayashi	1:36.6
2012	Fleet Street	Yasunari Iwata	Katsuhiko Sumii	Godolphin	1:38.7
2011	La Vie en Claire	Mirco Demuro	Nobuhiro Suzuki	Shadai Racehorse Co Ltd	1:38.2
2010	Birdie Birdie	Masami Matsuoka	Yasuo Ikee	Mieko Satomi	1:37.4
2009	Kanetoshi Kosho	Katsuharu Tanaka	Akira Murayama	Toshio Kanematsu	1:38.4
2008	Success Brocken	Norihiro Yokoyama	Hideaki Fujiwara	Tetsu Takashima	1:37.0
2007	Ferrari Pisa	Yasunari Iwata	Toshiaki Shirai	Yoshimi Ichikawa	1:35.9
2006	Flamme de Passion	Yutaka Take	Katsuhiko Sumii	Sunday Racing Co Ltd	1:38.2
2005	Don Cool	Shigefumi Kumazawa	Shinobu Umeuchi	Koichi Yamada	1:37.0
2004	Cafe Olympus	Yoshitomi Shibata	Yasuhisa Matsuyama	Koichi Nishikawa	1:37.1
2003	Big Wolf	Mirco Demuro	Tadashi Nakao	U.Big	1:53.0

== See also ==
- Horse racing in Japan
- List of Japanese flat horse races
