= Bernardini (horse) =

American Thoroughbred racehorse

- Sire: A.P. Indy
- Grandsire: Seattle Slew
- Dam: Cara Rafaela
- Damsire: Quiet American
- Sex: Stallion
- Foaled: March 23, 2003
- Died: July 30, 2021 (aged 18)
- Country: United States
- Colour: Bay
- Breeder: Darley Stud
- Owner: Darley Stable
- Trainer: Thomas Albertrani
- Record: 8: 6-1-0
- Earnings: $3,060,480

Major wins
- Jockey Club Gold Cup (2006); Withers Stakes (2006); Jim Dandy Stakes (2006); Travers Stakes (2006); Triple Crown classic race wins: Preakness Stakes (2006)

Awards
- U.S. Champion 3-Yr-Old Colt (2006); Co-World Champion 3-Year-Old (2006)
- Last updated on January 23, 2007

Bernardini (March 23, 2003 – July 30, 2021) was a champion American Thoroughbred racehorse who won the 2006 Preakness Stakes and Travers Stakes.

== Background ==
A son of A.P. Indy, he is out of Cara Rafaela, who won almost a million dollars during her racing career. Her sire was Quiet American, who also produced Real Quiet, a horse that came within a nose of winning the 1998 Triple Crown.

Bernardini was trained by Thomas Albertrani. He was owned by Sheikh Mohammed bin Rashid al Maktoum, Vice President and Prime Minister of the United Arab Emirates and ruler of Dubai.

== Racing career ==
Bernardini's racing career began at age three at Gulfstream Park where he finished 4th in a maiden race. After a lung infection kept him from racing for 2 months, he came back with a 7 3/4 length win in a Maiden Special Weight over one mile at Gulfstream. On April 29, he easily won the Grade III Withers Stakes prior to going to the Preakness. Bernardini won the 2006 Preakness Stakes by 5 1/4 lengths in a time of 1:54.65, in the same race where Kentucky Derby winner Barbaro suffered the hind leg fracture that ultimately led to the decision to euthanize the Derby winner.

After his Preakness win, Sheikh Mohammed decided that Bernardini would not race in the June 10 Belmont Stakes, which meant that for only the 4th time in 60 years, neither the Kentucky Derby winner nor the Preakness winner was in the field. A spokesman for Sheikh Mohammed's Darley Stable said that "...(Bernardini) climbed the ladder of competition quite quickly" and that "he deserves the break." Bernardini returned to the races on July 30 at Saratoga Race Course with a 10-length victory in the Jim Dandy Stakes over Minister's Bid. On August 26, 2006, he won the Travers Stakes, also in Saratoga, by 7 lengths over Haskell Invitational winner and Kentucky Derby and Belmont Stakes runner-up, Bluegrass Cat. In the October 7 Jockey Club Gold Cup, Bernardini earned a 117 Beyer figure in a winning effort.

In the 2006 Breeders' Cup Classic at Churchill Downs, Bernardini tracked near the lead and passed the frontrunner, Brother Derek, at the quarter pole. He fought to hold off Invasor at the sixteenth pole but fell short by a length, finishing second.

He won the Eclipse Award for 3 Year Old Male of the Year for 2006 and was retired to stud at Darley.

== Stud record ==
Bernardini has sired 16 individual Group/Grade 1 winners.

He was euthanised at Jonabell Farm in Kentucky on the 30 July 2021 due to complications from laminitis.

=== Notable progeny ===
c = colt, f = filly, g = gelding

Foaled	Name	Sex	Major Wins
2008	A Z Warrior	f	Frizette Stakes
2008	Biondetti	c	Premio Gran Criterium
2008	Stay Thirsty	c	Travers Stakes, Cigar Mile Handicap
2008	To Honor And Serve	c	Cigar Mile Handicap, Woodward Stakes
2009	Alpha	c	Travers Stakes, Woodward Stakes
2009	Boban	g	Epsom Handicap, Emirates Stakes, Chipping Norton Stakes, Doomben 10,000, Memsie Stakes
2010	Ruud Awakening	f	Diamond Stakes
2011	Dame Dorothy	f	Humana Distaff Stakes
2011	Go Indy Go	f	Champagne Stakes
2012	Cavorting	f	Test Stakes, Ogden Phipps Stakes, Personal Ensign Stakes
2013	Greenpointcrusader	c	Champagne Stakes
2013	Rachel's Valentina	f	Spinaway Stakes
2014	Capezzano	g	Al Maktoum Challenge, Round 3
2014	Takaful	c	Vosburgh Stakes
2015	Angela Renee	f	Chandelier Stakes
2017	Art Collector	c	Woodward Stakes, Pegasus World Cup
2017	West Will Power	c	Stephen Foster Stakes

Bernardini's success as a sire has attracted many top broodmares and racemares. On January 26, 2011, Jerry Moss and his wife Ann announced that Bernardini would be the first mate of the 2010 Horse of the Year when Zenyatta was booked to him later that season. She foaled a colt, Cozmic One, in March 2012. He has been a disappointment on the track, finishing badly in both of his starts. Zenyatta's dam and 2008 Kentucky Broodmare of the Year Vertigineux produced a debut-winning Bernardini filly named Eblouissante in 2009.

Visiting Bernardini in 2012 were 2009 Horse of the Year and American Champion Three-Year-Old Filly Rachel Alexandra and 2010 American Champion Three-Year-Old Filly Blind Luck. The 2013 filly produced by Rachel Alexandra, Rachel's Valentina, is a Grade I stakes winner and was runner-up to American Champion Two-Year-Old Filly Songbird, and widely considered the second-best two-year old of either gender in 2015.

Bernardini has been especially strong as a broodmare sire; in May 2021, he became the fastest ever to reach 50 stakes winners as a broodmare sire, with 29 of those being graded stakes winners. Both the 2025 Kentucky Derby winner Sovereignty and the 2026 Kentucky Derby winner Golden Tempo had Bernardini as their damsire.

Bernardini was euthanized on July 30, 2021, after complications from laminitis. He was 18.

== Racing record ==
Date	Race	Track	Location	Distance	Surface	Condition	Finish
January 7, 2006	Maiden Special Weight	Gulfstream Park	Hallandale Beach, Florida	6 fur.	Dirt	Fast	4th
March 4, 2006	Maiden Special Weight	Gulfstream Park	Hallandale Beach, Florida	1 mi.	Dirt	Fast	1st
April 29, 2006	Withers Stakes	Aqueduct Racetrack	New York City, New York	1 mi.	Dirt	Fast	1st
May 20, 2006	Preakness Stakes	Pimlico Race Course	Baltimore, Maryland	1 3/16 mi.	Dirt	Fast	1st
July 30, 2006	Jim Dandy Stakes	Saratoga Race Course	Saratoga Springs, New York	1 1/8 mi.	Dirt	Sloppy	1st
August 26, 2006	Travers Stakes	Saratoga Race Course	Saratoga Springs, New York	1 1/4 mi.	Dirt	Fast	1st
October 7, 2006	Jockey Club Gold Cup	Belmont Park	Elmont, New York	1 1/4 mi.	Dirt	Fast	1st
November 4, 2006	Breeders' Cup Classic	Churchill Downs	Louisville, Kentucky	1 1/4 mi.	Dirt	Fast	2nd

== Pedigree ==
Pedigree of Bernardini
Sire A.P. Indy	Seattle Slew	Bold Reasoning	Boldnesian
Sire A.P. Indy	Seattle Slew	Bold Reasoning	Reason to Earn
Sire A.P. Indy	Seattle Slew	My Charmer	Poker
Sire A.P. Indy	Seattle Slew	My Charmer	Fair Charmer
Sire A.P. Indy	Weekend Surprise	Secretariat	Bold Ruler
Sire A.P. Indy	Weekend Surprise	Secretariat	Somethingroyal
Sire A.P. Indy	Weekend Surprise	Lassie Dear	Buckpasser
Sire A.P. Indy	Weekend Surprise	Lassie Dear	Gay Missile
Dam Cara Rafaela	Quiet American	Fappiano	Mr. Prospector
Dam Cara Rafaela	Quiet American	Fappiano	Killaloe
Dam Cara Rafaela	Quiet American	Demure	Dr. Fager
Dam Cara Rafaela	Quiet American	Demure	Quiet Charm
Dam Cara Rafaela	Oil Fable	Spectacular Bid	Bold Bidder
Dam Cara Rafaela	Oil Fable	Spectacular Bid	Spectacular
Dam Cara Rafaela	Oil Fable	Northern Fable	Northern Dancer
Dam Cara Rafaela	Oil Fable	Northern Fable	Fareway Fable
