= 2006 Preakness Stakes =

131st running of the Preakness Stakes

131st Preakness Stakes
- The Preakness Stakes
- "The Middle Jewel of the Triple Crown" "The Run for the Black-Eyed Susans"
- Location: Pimlico Race Course, Baltimore, Maryland, United States
- Date: May 20, 2006
- Winning horse: Bernardini
- Winning time: 1:54.65
- Final odds: 12.9-1
- Jockey: Javier Castellano
- Trainer: Thomas Albertrani
- Conditions: Fast
- Surface: Dirt
- Attendance: 128,643

The 2006 Preakness Stakes was the 131st running of the Preakness Stakes thoroughbred horse race. The race took place on May 20, 2006, and was televised in the United States on the NBC television network. Bernardini, who was jockeyed by Javier Castellano, won the race by five and one quarter lengths over runner-up Sweetnorthernsaint. Approximate post time was 6:19 p.m. Eastern Time. The race was run over a fast track in a final time of 1:54.65. The Maryland Jockey Club reported total attendance of 128,643, this is recorded as second highest on the list of American thoroughbred racing top attended events for North America in 2006.

The running of the race was marred when Barbaro, the Kentucky Derby winner, broke down early in the race and sustained injuries on his right hind leg after a false start, ending his racing career.

== Payout ==
The 131st Preakness Stakes Payout Schedule

Program Number	Horse Name	Win	Place	Show
8	Bernardini	$27.80	$9.40	$5.80
7	Sweetnorthernsaint	-	$7.80	$5.00
3	Hemingway's Key	-	-	$8.00

- $2 Exacta: (8–7) paid $171.60
- $2 Trifecta: (8–7–3) paid $3,912.80
- $1 Superfecta: (8–7–3–5) paid $11,151.20

== The full chart ==
Finish Position	Margin (lengths)	Post Position	Horse name	Jockey	Trainer	Owner	Post Time Odds	Purse Earnings
1st	0	8	Bernardini	Javier Castellano	Thomas Albertrani	Darley Stables	12.90-1	$600,000
2nd	5-1/4	7	Sweetnorthernsaint	Kent Desormeaux	Michael Trombetta	Joseph Balsamo & Ted Theos	8.40-1	$200,000
3rd	11-1/4	3	Hemingway's Key	Jeremy Rose	Nicholas P. Zito	Kinsman Stable	29.40-1	$110,000
4th	15-1/4	5	Brother Derek	Alex Solis	Dan L. Hendricks	Cecil N. Peacock	3.20-1	$60,000
5th	22-1/4	4	Greeley's Galaxy	Richard Migliore	George Weaver	Donald Flanagan	34.90-1	$30,000
6th	22 1/2	2	Platinum Couple	Jose Espinoza	Joseph A. Lostritto	Team Tristar Stable	33.20-1	
7th	25 3/4	1	Like Now	Garrett Gomez	Kiaran McLaughlin	John J. Dillon	17.40-1	
8th	28	9	Diabolical	Ramon Dominguez	Steve Klesaris	Puglisi Stables	26.00-1	
9th	dnf	6	Barbaro	Edgar Prado	Michael Matz	Lael Stables	0.5-1 favorite	

- Winning Breeder: Darley Stud; (KY)
- Final Time: 1:54.65
- Track Condition: Fast
- Total Attendance: 128,643
