= Jim Dandy Stakes =

- Class: Grade II
- Location: Saratoga Race Course; Saratoga Springs, New York, United States
- Inaugurated: 1964
- Race type: Thoroughbred – Flat racing
- Website: www.nyra.com

Race information
- Distance: 1 1/8 miles (9 furlongs)
- Surface: Dirt
- Track: left-handed
- Qualification: Three-year-olds
- Purse: $500,000

The Jim Dandy Stakes is an American Thoroughbred horse race. The Grade II race has been held annually since 1964 at Saratoga Race Course in Saratoga Springs, New York. The race is open to horses age three over one and one-eighth miles on the dirt. It currently carries a purse of $500,000. Prior to 1971, the race was 1 mile in length. For 1971 only, the distance was decreased to 7 furlongs.

The Jim Dandy Stakes is usually run on the first Saturday of the late July Saratoga racing season and is named in honor of the 3-year-old colt, Jim Dandy, who won the 1930 Travers Stakes at odds of 100 to 1, beating Triple Crown winner Gallant Fox. The Jim Dandy Stakes is typically used as a preparatory race for the Travers Stakes.

The Jim Dandy was run for the 56th time in 2019.

== Records ==
Speed record:

- 1 1/8 miles – 1:47.26 – Louis Quatorze (1996)

Most wins by an owner:

- 4 – Godolphin Racing LLC (2012, 2020, 2021, 2025)
- 4 – Repole Stable (2011, 2023, 2024, 2026)

Most wins by a jockey:

- 5 – John R. Velazquez (2003, 2004, 2005, 2010, 2024)

Most wins by a trainer:

- 9 – Todd A. Pletcher (2000, 2003, 2004, 2005, 2011, 2013, 2023, 2024, 2026)

== Winners ==
Year	Winner	Jockey	Trainer	Owner	Distance	Time	Grade
2026	Renegade	Irad Ortiz Jr.	Todd A. Pletcher	Repole Stable and Robert & Lawana L. Low	1 1/8	1:49:08	II
2025	Sovereignty	Junior Alvarado	William I. Mott	Godolphin Racing, LLC	1 1/8	1:49.52	II
2024	Fierceness	John R. Velazquez	Todd A. Pletcher	Repole Stable	1 1/8	1:49.15	II
2023	Forte	Irad Ortiz Jr.	Todd A. Pletcher	Repole Stable and St. Elias Stable	1 1/8	1:49.61	II
2022	Epicenter	Joel Rosario	Steven M. Asmussen	Winchell Thoroughbreds	1 1/8	1:48.99	II
2021	Essential Quality	Luis Saez	Brad H. Cox	Godolphin Racing LLC	1 1/8	1:49.92	II
2020	Mystic Guide	José Ortiz	Michael Stidham	Godolphin Racing LLC	1 1/8	1:49.00	II
2019	Tax	Irad Ortiz Jr	Danny Gargan	R.A. Hill Stable, Reeves Thoroughbred Racing, Hugh Lynch & Corms Racing Stable	1 1/8	1:49.28	II
2018	Tenfold	Ricardo Santana Jr.	Steven M. Asmussen	Winchell Thoroughbreds	1 1/8	1:50.49	II
2017	Good Samaritan	Joel Rosario	William I. Mott	WinStar Farm	1 1/8	1:50.69	II
2016	Laoban	José Ortiz	Eric J. Guillot	McCormick Racing & Southern Equine Stable	1 1/8	1:48.39	II
2015	Texas Red	Kent Desormeaux	J. Keith Desormeaux	Erich Brehm, Wayne Detmar, Lee Michaels & J. Keith Desormeaux	1 1/8	1:48.77	II
2014	Wicked Strong	Rajiv Maragh	James A. Jerkens	Centennial Farms	1 1/8	1:49.16	II
2013	Palace Malice	Mike E. Smith	Todd A. Pletcher	Dogwood Stable	1 1/8	1:47.37	II
2012	Alpha	Ramon Domínguez	Kiaran McLaughlin	Godolphin Stables	1 1/8	1:50.47	II
2011	Stay Thirsty	Javier Castellano	Todd A. Pletcher	Repole Stable	1 1/8	1:48.78	II
2010	A Little Warm	John R. Velazquez	Anthony W. Dutrow	Edward P. Evans	1 1/8	1:47.98	II
2009	Kensei	Edgar Prado	Steven M. Asmussen	Stonestreet Stables & Gulf Coast Farms	1 1/8	1:47.90	II
2008	Macho Again	Julien Leparoux	Dallas Stewart	West Point Thoroughbreds	1 1/8	1:51.16	II
2007	Street Sense	Calvin Borel	Carl Nafzger	James B. Tafel	1 1/8	1:48.99	II
2006	Bernardini	Javier Castellano	Thomas Albertrani	Darley Racing	1 1/8	1:50.50	II
2005	Flower Alley	John R. Velazquez	Todd A. Pletcher	Melnyk Racing	1 1/8	1:49.50	II
2004	Purge	John R. Velazquez	Todd A. Pletcher	Starlight Stables	1 1/8	1:47.56	II
2003	Strong Hope	John R. Velazquez	Todd A. Pletcher	Melnyk Racing	1 1/8	1:48.10	II
2002	Medaglia d'Oro	Jerry Bailey	Robert J. Frankel	Edmund A. Gann	1 1/8	1:47.82	II
2001	Scorpion	Jerry Bailey	D. Wayne Lukas	Robert Baker	1 1/8	1:48.90	I
2000	Graeme Hall	Jerry Bailey	Todd A. Pletcher	Melnyk Racing	1 1/8	1:48.95	II
1999	Ecton Park	Alex Solis	W. Elliott Walden	Mark Stanley	1 1/8	1:49.52	II
1998	Favorite Trick	Pat Day	William I. Mott	Joseph LaCombe	1 1/8	1:50.00	II
1997	Awesome Again	Mike E. Smith	David Hofmans	Frank Stronach	1 1/8	1:51.16	II
1996	Louis Quatorze	Pat Day	Nick Zito	Wiliam J. Condren, Georgia E. Hofmann & A. Cornacchia	1 1/8	1:47.26	II
1995	Composer	Jerry Bailey	William I. Mott	Henryk de Kwiatkowski	1 1/8	1:51.13	II
1994	Unaccounted For	José A. Santos	Flint S. Schulhofer	Morven Stud	1 1/8	1:49.69	II
1993	Miner's Mark	Chris McCarron	Claude R. McGaughey III	Ogden Phipps	1 1/8	1:49.01	II
1992	Thunder Rumble	Herb McCauley	Richard O'Connell	Braeburn Farm	1 1/8	1:47.53	I
1991	Fly So Free	José A. Santos	Flint S. Schulhofer	Tommy Valando	1 1/8	1:48.88	II
1990	Chief Honcho	Mike E. Smith	William I. Mott	Bertram R. Firestone	1 1/8	1:51.74	I
1989	Is It True	José A. Santos	D. Wayne Lukas	Eugene V. Klein	1 1/8	1:48.40	II
1988	Brian's Time	Ángel Cordero Jr.	John M. Veitch	James W. Phillips	1 1/8	1:48.20	I
1987	Polish Navy	Pat Day	Claude R. McGaughey III	Ogden Mills Phipps	1 1/8	1:48.40	II
1986	Lac Quimet	Eddie Maple	Richard J. Lundy	Virginia Kraft Payson	1 1/8	1:48.00	II
1985	Stephan's Odyssey	Laffit Pincay Jr.	Woody Stephens	Henryk de Kwiatkowski	1 1/8	1:48.80	II
1984	Carr de Naskra	Eddie Maple	Richard J. Lundy	Virginia Kraft Payson	1 1/8	1:47.40	II
1983	A Phenomenon	Ángel Cordero Jr.	Angel Penna Jr.	Brownell Combs II	1 1/8	1:49.40	III
1982	Conquistador Cielo	Eddie Maple	Woody Stephens	Henryk de Kwiatkowski	1 1/8	1:48.60	III
1981	Willow Hour	Eddie Maple	James E. Picou	Marcia W. Schott	1 1/8	1:49.20	III
1980	Plugged Nickle	Jeffrey Fell	Thomas J. Kelly	John M. Schiff	1 1/8	1:49.40	III
1979	Private Account	Jeffrey Fell	Angel Penna Sr.	Ogden Phipps	1 1/8	1:48.40	III
1978	Affirmed	Steve Cauthen	Lazaro S. Barrera	Harbor View Farm	1 1/8	1:47.80	II
1977	Music of Time	Michael Venezia	MacKenzie Miller	Rokeby Stable	1 1/8	1:50.40	III
1976	Father Hogan	Michael Venezia	William F. Schmitt	Sea Spray Farms	1 1/8	1:48.80	III
1975	Forceten	Donald Pierce	Neil D. Drysdale	Saron Stable	1 1/8	1:48.40	III
1974	Sea Songster	Ángel Cordero Jr.	John P. Campo	Buckland Farm	1 1/8	1:50.60	III
1973	Cheriepe	Eddie Belmonte	W. Preston King	Camijo Stable	1 1/8	1:50.20	III
1972	Tentam	Jorge Velásquez	MacKenzie Miller	Cragwood Stables	1 1/8	1:49.60	
1971	Brazen Brother	Michael Hole	Warren A. Croll Jr.	Jaclyn Stable	7 fur.	1:22.80	
1970	Personality	Laffit Pincay Jr.	John W. Jacobs	Ethel D. Jacobs	1 mile	1:35.80	
1969	Arts and Letters	Braulio Baeza	J. Elliott Burch	Rokeby Stable	1 mile	1:36.00	
1968	Captain's Gig	Manuel Ycaza	William W. Stephens	Cain Hoy Stable	1 mile	1:35.80	
1967	Gala Performance	Eddie Belmonte	Willard C. Freeman	Alfred G. Vanderbilt II	1 mile	1:36.20	
1966	Indulto	John L. Rotz	Max Hirsch	Jane Greer	1 mile	1:37.00	
1965	Cornish Prince	Ron Turcotte	Sylvester Veitch	George D. Widener Jr.	1 mile	1:35.60	
1964	Malicious	John L. Rotz	John M. Gaver Sr.	Greentree Stable	1 mile	1:35.60	
