= Old Fashioned (horse) =

American-bred Thoroughbred racehorse

- Sire: Unbridled's Song
- Grandsire: Unbridled
- Dam: Collect Call
- Damsire: Meadowlake
- Sex: Stallion
- Foaled: 2006
- Country: United States
- Colour: Gray
- Breeder: Rod and Lorraine Rodriguez
- Owner: Fox Hill Farms
- Trainer: J. Larry Jones
- Record: 6: 4–2–0
- Earnings: US$583,280

Major wins
- Remsen Stakes (2008); Southwest Stakes (2009)

Awards
- Finalist 2008 2 yo Eclipse Award

Old Fashioned (foaled January 27, 2006 in Kentucky) is an American Thoroughbred racehorse who was one of the top winterbook favorites for the 2009 Kentucky Derby until an injury in April's Arkansas Derby forced him to retire.

== Background ==
Out of the stakes-winning mare Collect Call, Old Fashioned's damsire was the very fast colt, Meadowlake. He was sired by Unbridled's Song, a winner of three Grade I races including the 1995 Breeders' Cup Juvenile. Grandsire Unbridled won the 1990 Kentucky Derby and Breeders' Cup Classic.

Bred by Rod and Lorraine Rodriguez, Old Fashioned was purchased for $800,000 by Rick Porter's Fox Hill Farms at the September 2007 Keeneland yearling sale and sent into training with Larry Jones.

== Racing career ==
=== 2008: two-year-old season ===
The colt raced at age two in 2008, winning all three of his starts. Ridden by jockey Terry Thompson in his first two starts, he won his debut by a nose in a six-furlong event at Delaware Park Racetrack. In his next start, Old Fashioned won a one-mile race (eight furlongs) over the same track by 15 1/2 lengths.

Old Fashioned was not entered in the 2008 Breeders' Cup Juvenile but ran instead in the November 29 Remsen Stakes at New York City's Aqueduct Racetrack. Ridden by Ramon Dominguez, Old Fashioned won the 1 1/8 miles (1.8 km) Grade II event by 7 1/4 lengths while finishing under a hard hold. In a December 26, 2008 article on the ESPN website, award-winning horse racing writer Bill Finley picked Old Fashioned as the number one contender for the first leg of the 2009 U.S. Triple Crown series, the Kentucky Derby.

Old Fashioned was a finalist for the 2008 Eclipse Award for American Champion Two-Year-Old Colt.

=== 2009: three-year-old season ===
Old Fashioned made his three-year-old debut at Hot Springs, Arkansas in the G3 Southwest Stakes. He defeated his competitors, easily going the mile. He next ran in the G2 Rebel Stakes where he suffered his first loss when he was passed by Win Willie on the stretch. In his next start, he finished second to Papa Clem in the Arkansas Derby (G2), when he was beaten by half a length. After the race, it was discovered that Old Fashioned had suffered a non-displaced slab fracture of his right knee. Following surgery at the Rood & Riddle Equine Hospital in Lexington, Kentucky, the colt was retired from racing.

== Retirement ==
Old Fashioned entered stud in 2010 at Taylor Made Farm in Kentucky. He's produced several stakes winners including Grade I winner, Fashion Plate. He was moved in 2016 to stand in South Korea at Jeju-do.
