= Wathnan Racing =

Emir of Qatar's horse racing group

Racing silks of Wathnan Racing

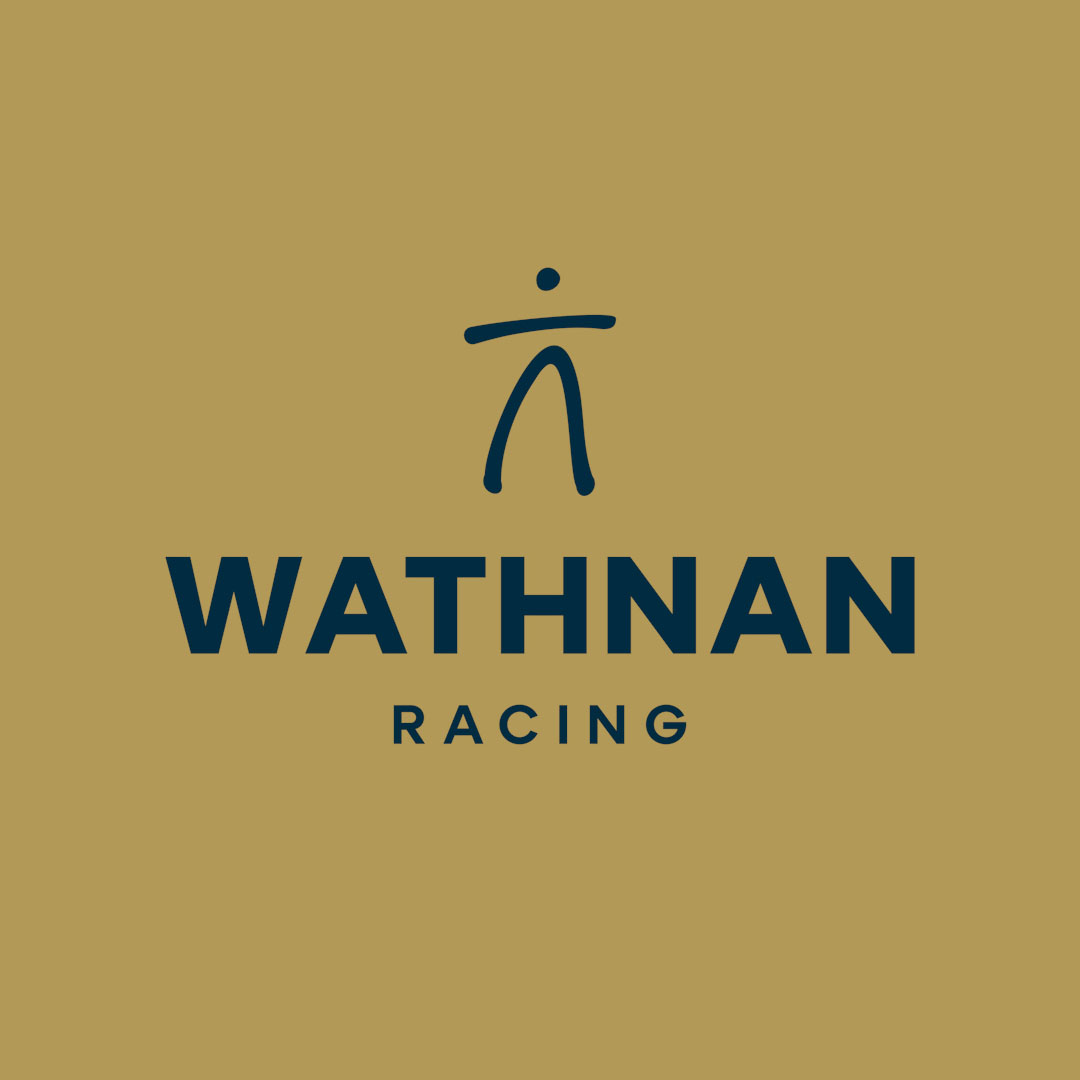
Wathnan Racing Logo

Wathnan Racing is the Thoroughbred racing group of Tamim bin Hamad Al Thani, Emir of Qatar. The group was set up in Qatar and established a small yard in Newmarket, England, in 2024.

Sheikh Tamim, who is a brother of Sheikh Joaan of Al Shaqab Racing and cousin of Sheikh Fahad of Qatar Racing, set up Wathnan Racing in 2022, spending 1,750,000 guineas at the Tattersalls Autumn Horses in Training Sale on nine horses to race in Qatar. He was the leading owner in his first season in Qatar in 2022-23, and again the following season. The 2023-24 Qatar racing season also saw Wathnan's Simca Mille win the top thoroughbred award, and Wathnan's trainer Alban de Mieulle win the champion trainer award.

In April 2023, bloodstock agent Richard Brown was asked to source three horses in England to run at Royal Ascot. Gregory, Courage Mon Ami and Isaac Shelby were Wathnan Racing's first runners in Britain. Courage Mon Ami, trained by John and Thady Gosden, won the Ascot Gold Cup under Frankie Dettori, while Gregory, trained by the Gosdens and ridden by James Doyle, won the Queen's Vase, and Isaac Shelby, trained by Brian Meehan and ridden by William Buick, came fourth in the St James's Palace Stakes. Later that year, Doyle was appointed as retained jockey for Wathnan Racing.

Wathnan Racing established a yard in Newmarket in 2024, when Qatari trainer Hamad Al Jehani moved into the lower yard at Kremlin Stables to train a few horses during the summer season. Wathnan Racing continued to place most of their horses, including Royal Ascot winners, with other trainers.

In 2025, Wathnan Racing had five winners at Royal Ascot, and also won the Dubai World Cup with 66/1 chance Hit Show, trained in the US by Brad H. Cox and ridden by Florent Geroux.
