= José Ortiz (jockey) =

Puerto Rican jockey (born 1993)

José Luis Ortiz
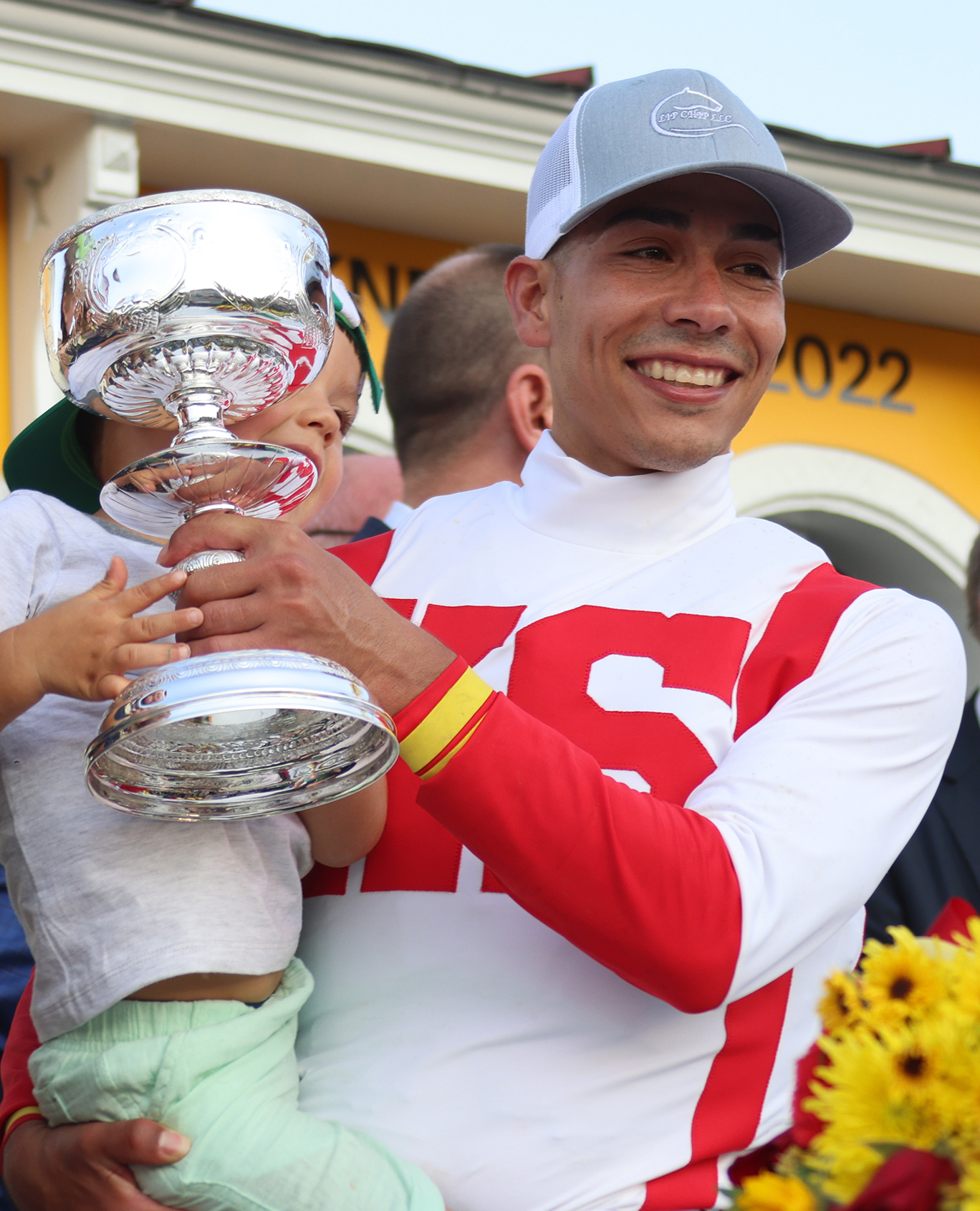
- Ortiz after winning the 2022 Preakness Stakes

Personal information
- Born: October 2, 1993 (age 32) Trujillo Alto, Puerto Rico
- Occupation: Jockey

Horse racing career
- Sport: Horse racing
- Career wins: 3,021+

Major racing wins
- Hopeful Stakes (2013, 2016); Beldame Stakes (2014, 2017, 2018); Dubai World Cup (2026); Frizette Stakes (2014, 2017); Delaware Handicap (2014, 2018,2019); Carter Handicap (2015); John Morrissey Stakes (2015, 2016); Joe Hirsch Turf Classic (2016, 2018); Mother Goose Stakes (2016, 2019); Alabama Stakes (2017, 2018, 2019); Belmont Derby (2017, 2023); Humana Distaff Stakes (2017, 2018, 2022); Madison Stakes (2017); Manhattan Handicap (2017); Secretariat Stakes (2017); Test Stakes (2017, 2018); Flower Bowl Stakes (2017); Vosburgh Stakes (2017); Kentucky Oaks (2019,2026); New York Breeders' Futurity (2019); Woody Stephens Stakes (2021, 2022); Pegasus World Cup Filly & Mare Turf (2022); Derby City Distaff Stakes (2022); Just a Game Stakes (2022); New York Stakes (2023); Tremont Stakes (2023) Triple Crown wins: Belmont Stakes (2017, 2026); Preakness Stakes (2022); Kentucky Derby (2026) Breeders' Cup wins: Breeders' Cup Mile (2024); Breeders' Cup Juvenile Turf (2016); Breeders' Cup Juvenile (2017); Breeders' Cup Juvenile Fillies Turf (2021); Breeders' Cup Sprint (2021)

Racing awards
- Eclipse Award for Outstanding Jockey (2017); United States Champion Jockey by wins (2016); United States Champion Jockey by earnings (2017)

Significant horses
- Good Magic, Shaman Ghost, La Verdad, Oscar Performance, Paulassilverling, Tapwrit, Early Voting, Golden Tempo
- Updated on 6 June 2026

José L. Ortiz (born October 2, 1993) is a Puerto Rican jockey who has been a rider on the New York Thoroughbred horse racing circuit since 2012. As the jockey for Golden Tempo, he won the 2026 Kentucky Derby and 2026 Belmont Stakes. In 2016, he was the leading jockey in North America by number of wins, including his first win at the Breeders' Cup. In 2017, he earned the Eclipse Award for Outstanding Jockey after he led the earnings list and won his first Triple Crown race, the 2017 Belmont Stakes. In 2019 and 2026 he won the Kentucky Oaks. In 2022, he won the Preakness Stakes, his second Triple Crown race win. In 2026, he rode Golden Tempo in the Kentucky Derby, his third Triple Crown win.

== Personal life ==
Ortiz was born in Trujillo Alto, Puerto Rico, the son of Irad Ortiz and Vilma Morales Adorno. His grandfather, also named Irad Ortiz, was a jockey, as was uncle, Ivan Ortiz. He and his older brother, Irad Ortiz Jr., became interested in the sport from a young age, encouraged by family friend Efraim "Pito" Rosa and mentored by Hall of Fame rider Ángel Cordero Jr.

Ortiz attended Puerto Rico's Escuela Vocacional Hípica, a school for prospective jockeys, then moved to the United States in 2012 to join Irad, who had already become a leading jockey. When Ortiz followed suit by becoming one of the leading apprentice jockeys of 2012, the two brothers quickly attracted attention. "They're doing this in New York – the Mecca of racing – two riders fighting for the title," said Pito in early 2013. "I don't remember ever seeing two brothers do that." The brothers are highly competitive with each other, even when playing basketball or baseball or video games such as Gallop Racer. "That's just what we do," Ortiz said. "We've always competed, trying to beat each other. It's still fun. We're still very close. We share the same corner in the jockey's room in New York and when we get done racing, he usually stops by my house, just about every day."

Ortiz married jockey Taylor Rice on December 20, 2016. The two had a daughter, Leilani, in June 2017.

== Career ==
Ortiz recorded his first win in Puerto Rico on January 7, 2012, at Hipodromo Camarero. Soon thereafter he moved to the U.S., where he recorded his first American win on March 13 at Parx Casino and Racing. On July 15, he suffered multiple injuries including a punctured lung after a fall. He returned to racing on August 26, and finished the year with 98 wins from 697 starts.

In 2013, he won 224 races including his first Grade I victory in the Hopeful Stakes with Strong Mandate. For the next two years, he maintained a consistent level of success with 234 wins in 2014 and 244 wins in 2015. In 2016 he had a breakthrough year with 351 wins, which Ortiz attributed to increased experience. Trainer Linda Rice, who is the aunt of Ortiz's wife, concurred. "He's always been a very good speed rider but in the last year and a half, he's not one dimensional," she said. "He's a top rider period. He sees the race well. He's extremely athletic and puts his horses in good position. He makes very few mistakes." Ortiz is known for his soft hands and ability to get horses to relax.

On July 28, 2016, Ortiz earned his 1,000th career win when he rode Moonlight Song to victory in the John Morrissey Stakes at Saratoga. He went on to win the Saratoga riding title with 65 wins. In November, Ortiz won his first Breeders' Cup race, the Juvenile Turf, aboard Oscar Performance. Ortiz went on to win his first New York Racing Association (NYRA) year-end title with 319 wins at Aqueduct, Belmont Park and Saratoga over the course of 2016. He finished 2016 in as the leading jockey in North America by number of wins and in third place by earnings. He was a finalist for the Eclipse Award for Outstanding Jockey, finishing third. "It was great to be among the final three with a Hall of Famer like Mike Smith and a future Hall of Famer in Javier (Castellano)," he said. "I'll keep working hard until I win it."

In 2017, Ortiz earned his first win in a Triple Crown race with Tapwrit in the Belmont Stakes. He was again the leading rider at Saratoga, highlighted by a victory on Elate in the Alabama Stakes. He won the Breeders' Cup Juvenile aboard Good Magic and finished the year as the leading jockey in the United States by earnings. He was voted the Eclipse Award for Outstanding Jockey. Ortiz rode Good Magic to a second-place finish in the 2018 Kentucky Derby. In 2026, he won his second Kentucky Oaks with Always a Runner followed by his first Kentucky Derby on Golden Tempo.

=== Year-end charts ===
Chart (2012–present)	Year-End Rank by earnings
National Earnings List for Jockeys 2012	91
National Earnings List for Jockeys 2013	11
National Earnings List for Jockeys 2014	5
National Earnings List for Jockeys 2015	4
National Earnings List for Jockeys 2016	3
National Earnings List for Jockeys 2017	1
National Earnings List for Jockeys 2018	2
National Earnings List for Jockeys 2019	2
National Earnings List for Jockeys 2020	7
National Earnings List for Jockeys 2021	4
