= Cara Rafaela =

American Thoroughbred racehorse

- Sire: Quiet American
- Grandsire: Fappiano
- Dam: Oil Fable
- Damsire: Spectacular Bid
- Sex: Mare
- Foaled: March 30, 1993
- Died: December 30, 2016 (aged 23)
- Country: United States
- Colour: Grey
- Breeder: Mike G. Rutherford
- Owner: Darley Stable
- Trainer: D. Wayne Lukas
- Record: 24: 4-8-2
- Earnings: $884,452

Major wins
- Hollywood Starlet Stakes(1995); Alcibiades Stakes (1995); Pio Pico Stakes (1997)

Awards
- Kentucky Broodmare of the Year (2006)
- Last updated on 30 December 2016

Cara Rafaela (March 30, 1993 – December 30, 2016) was a grey Kentucky thoroughbred mare, by the stallion Quiet American out of a Spectacular Bid mare Oil Fable. She was a Grade 1 stakes winner and the 2006 Kentucky Broodmare of the Year.

== Race career ==
Cara Rafaela's first start was a Maiden Special Weight, where she finished second. Trainer D. Wayne Lukas then entered her in the Grade II Landaluce Stakes, where she finished 8 ½ lengths off of the lead in seventh place. Back in maiden company, Cara Rafaela broke her maiden by 4 ½ lengths in her fourth start. Lukas then shipped her to Belmont Park to run in the Grade I Matron Stakes, where she finished second by a neck to Golden Attraction after going wide on the final turn. In her next start, the Grade II Alcibiades Stakes, she won her first stakes race. In the Breeders' Cup Juvenile Fillies, Cara Rafaela stalked the lead and lost to My Flag, daughter of the champion mare Personal Ensign, by half a length. Favorite Golden Attraction finished one and a half lengths behind her. Less than two weeks later, Cara Rafaela was the favorite in the ungraded Pocahontas Stakes but had a wide trip and finished fourth. A month later, in December of her two-year-old year, she closed out her season with a victory in the Grade I Hollywood Starlet, beating Advancing Star by a head.

In her three-year-old season, Cara Rafaela went winless in seven starts. Entered in the Grade III El Camino Real Derby as the favorite, she placed fourth, less than three lengths behind the winner. She then finished second to Antespand in the Grade I Las Virgenes Stakes and Santa Anita Oaks before meeting My Flag again in the Ashland Stakes. Cara Rafaela took the lead but faded to finish second to My Flag by three lengths, with the third-place finisher ten lengths back. She finished third in the Kentucky Oaks (ahead of Antespend and My Flag in fourth and fifth) and concluded her season by running second in the Black-Eyed Susan Stakes and third in the Mother Goose Stakes.

Cara Rafaela returned to the track in March at age four. In her debut in the Santa Lucia Handicap, she encountered traffic and finished eighth. She then finished fourth in an allowance race and seventh in the Grade I Hempstead Handicap before failing to place in two more allowance events. The last victory of her career came in the ungraded Pio Pico Stakes. Cara Rafaela next finished last in the Autumn Days Handicap. Her final race was an allowance, in which she finished fourth. She was then retired to the broodmare barn.

== Broodmare career ==
Cara Rafaela biggest accomplishment was achieved during her time as a broodmare. In 2003, she gave birth to a brown colt by A. P. Indy named Bernardini. This son, who would become 2006 Eclipse Champion 3-year-old Colt and Co-World Champion 3-year-old, would earn her the title of 2006 Kentucky Broodmare of the Year. Even though she has produced other winners, Bernardini remains her only stakes winner. This doesn't mean that she didn't produce any other useful foals. Her 1999 Storm Cat filly, Ile de France, was a grade 1 placed winner, and went on to be a black-type producer like her mother. "(Cara Rafaela) was euthanized... due to the infirmities of old age according to a December 30, 2016 release from Godolphin. She was 23."
