= Commandment (horse) =

American racehorse

- Sire: Into Mischief
- Grandsire: Harlan's Holiday
- Dam: Sippican Harbor
- Damsire: Orb
- Sex: Colt
- Foaled: February 23, 2023
- Country: United States
- Color: Bay
- Breeder: Lee Pokoik
- Owner: Wathnan Racing
- Trainer: Brad H. Cox
- Record: 8: 4 - 2 - 0
- Earnings: US$1,477,339

Major wins
- Fountain of Youth Stakes (2026); Florida Derby (2026)

Commandment (foaled February 23, 2023) is a Grade I winning American Thoroughbred racehorse who won the 2026 Florida Derby.

== Background ==
Commandment is a bay colt who was bred in Kentucky by Lee Pokoik and is out of a mare he raced—Sippican Harbor, winner of the 2018 Grade I Spinaway Stakes at Saratoga Racetrack. Initially, Commandment was offered twice, once as a weanling at Fasig-Tipton's The November Sale, failing to meet his reserve at $485,000, and again at Fasig-Tipton's The Saratoga Sale as a yearling, with a final bid of $475,000. In the fall of 2023 at Keeneland's September Yearling Sale, Case Clay Thoroughbred Management bought the colt for $500,000 for Wathnan Racing.

Commandment's sire is Into Mischief, a Grade I winner at the age of two who has been North America's leading sire by purse winnings in multiple years since 2018.

Commandment is trained by US Champion trainer Brad H. Cox.

Commandment was the leading qualification point earner in the 2026 Road to the Kentucky Derby.

== Statistics ==
Date	Distance	Race	Grade	Track	Odds	Field	Finish	Winning Time	Winning (Losing) Margin	Jockey	Ref
2025 – Two-year-old season
Oct 4, 2025	6 furlongs	Maiden Special Weight		Keeneland	2.63*	12	4	1:10.23	(5 1/4 lengths)	Irad Ortiz Jr.	
Nov 1, 2025	7 furlongs	Maiden Special Weight		Churchill Downs	1.49*	9	1	1:24.63	5 1/4 lengths	Jaime Torres	
2026 – Three-year-old season
Jan 3, 2026	1 mile	Mucho Macho Man Stakes	Listed	Gulfstream Park	0.50*	7	1	1:38.23	6 3/4 lengths	Irad Ortiz Jr.	
Feb 28, 2026	1 1/16 miles	Fountain of Youth Stakes	II	Gulfstream Park	2.40	9	1	1:43.33	neck	Irad Ortiz Jr.	
Mar 28, 2026	1 1/8 miles	Florida Derby	I	Gulfstream Park	1.90	6	1	1:49.99	nose	Flavien Prat	
May 2, 2026	1 1/4 miles	Kentucky Derby	I	Churchill Downs	6.18	18	7	2:02.27	(5 1/4 lengths)	Luis Saez	
Jun 6, 2026	1 1/4 miles	Belmont Stakes	I	Saratoga	6.04	9	2	2:03.49	(1 1/4 lengths)	John Velazquez	
Aug 1, 2026	1 1/8 miles	Jim Dandy Stakes	II	Saratoga	1.19*	5	2	1:49.08	(1/2 length)	Flavien Prat	

Notes:
An (*) asterisk after the odds means Commandment was the post-time favourite.

== Pedigree ==
Pedigree of Renegade, bay colt, January 25, 2023
Sire Into Mischief (2005)	Harlan's Holiday (1999)	Harlan (1989)	Storm Cat (1983)
Sire Into Mischief (2005)	Harlan's Holiday (1999)	Harlan (1989)	Country Romance (1976)
Sire Into Mischief (2005)	Harlan's Holiday (1999)	Christmas in Aiken (1992)	Affirmed (1975)
Sire Into Mischief (2005)	Harlan's Holiday (1999)	Christmas in Aiken (1992)	Dowager (1980)
Sire Into Mischief (2005)	Leslie's Lady (1996)	Tricky Creek (1986)	Clever Trick (1976)
Sire Into Mischief (2005)	Leslie's Lady (1996)	Tricky Creek (1986)	Battle Creek Girl (1977)
Sire Into Mischief (2005)	Leslie's Lady (1996)	Crystal Lady (1990)	Stop the Music (1970)
Sire Into Mischief (2005)	Leslie's Lady (1996)	Crystal Lady (1990)	One Last Bird (1980)
Dam Sippican Harbor (2016)	Orb (2010)	Malibu Moon (1997)	A.P. Indy (1989)
Dam Sippican Harbor (2016)	Orb (2010)	Malibu Moon (1997)	Macoumba (1992)
Dam Sippican Harbor (2016)	Orb (2010)	Lady Liberty (1999)	Unbridled (1987)
Dam Sippican Harbor (2016)	Orb (2010)	Lady Liberty (1999)	Mesabi Maiden (1993)
Dam Sippican Harbor (2016)	Blossomed (2003)	Deputy Minister (1979)	Vice Regent (1967)
Dam Sippican Harbor (2016)	Blossomed (2003)	Deputy Minister (1979)	Mint Copy (1970)
Dam Sippican Harbor (2016)	Blossomed (2003)	Texas Cinema (1990)	Mt. Livermore (1981)
Dam Sippican Harbor (2016)	Blossomed (2003)	Texas Cinema (1990)	French Flick (1978) (Family: 16-g)
