= Renegade (horse) =

American racehorse

- Sire: Into Mischief
- Grandsire: Harlan's Holiday
- Dam: Spice Is Nice
- Damsire: Curlin
- Sex: Colt
- Foaled: January 25, 2023
- Country: United States
- Color: Bay
- Breeder: Robert & Lawana Low
- Owner: Robert & Lawana Low & Repole Stable
- Trainer: Todd A. Pletcher
- Record: 9: 3 - 3 - 2
- Earnings: US$2,514,000

Major wins
- Arkansas Derby (2026); Jim Dandy Stakes (2026)
- Last updated on August 30, 2026

Renegade (foaled January 25, 2023) is a multiple graded stakes winning American Thoroughbred racehorse who won the 2026 Arkansas Derby.

== Background ==
Renegade is a bay colt who was bred in Kentucky by Robert and Lawana Low. He is out of the Graded-winning Curlin mare Spice Is Nice. Spice Is Nice in 2021 won the Grade III Allaire duPont Distaff Match Series Stakes at Pimlico Racetrack. Renegade's great dam Dame Dorothy was a Grade I winner winning the 2015 Humana Distaff Stakes at Churchill Downs. In her career Dame Dorothy won 7 events from twelve starts and was only unplaced twice in her racing career.

Mike Repole's Repole Stable bought into a 50/50 partnership with the Lows for $975,000 at the 2024 Keeneland September Yearling Sale for Renegade.

Renegade's sire is Into Mischief, a Grade I winner at the age of two who has been North America's leading sire by purse winnings in multiple years since 2018.

Renegade is trained by US Hall of Fame trainer Todd A. Pletcher.

== Statistics ==
Date	Distance	Race	Grade	Track	Odds	Field	Finish	Winning Time	Winning (Losing) Margin	Jockey	Ref
2025 – Two-year-old season
Aug 16, 2025	6 1/2 furlongs	Maiden Special Weight		Saratoga	5.90	9	3	1:15.63	(17 3/4 lengths)	Irad Ortiz Jr.	
Oct 17, 2025	1 mile	Maiden Special Weight		Aqueduct	4.93	7	2 (Note: Renegade was first past the post but was disqualified for interference in the stretch run and Paladin was placed first)	1:36.11	head	John R. Velazquez	
Dec 6, 2025	1 1/8 miles	Remsen Stakes	II	Aqueduct	2.97	11	2	1:50.97	(2 lengths)	Irad Ortiz Jr.	
2026 – Three-year-old season
Feb 7, 2026	1 1/16 miles	Sam F. Davis Stakes	Listed	Tampa Bay Downs	1.20*	9	1	1:43.54	3 3/4 lengths	Irad Ortiz Jr.	
Mar 28, 2026	1 1/8 miles	Arkansas Derby	I	Oaklawn Park	1.00*	8	1	1:49.70	4 lengths	Irad Ortiz Jr.	
May 2, 2026	1 1/4 miles	Kentucky Derby	I	Churchill Downs	5.65	18	2	2:02.27	(neck)	Irad Ortiz Jr.	
Jun 6, 2026	1 1/4 miles	Belmont Stakes	I	Saratoga	1.75*	9	3	2:03.49	(5 1/4 lengths)	Irad Ortiz Jr.	
Aug 1, 2026	1 1/8 miles	Jim Dandy Stakes	II	Saratoga	1.36	5	1	1:49.08	1/2 lengths	Irad Ortiz Jr.	
Aug 29, 2026	1 1/4 miles	Travers Stakes	I	Saratoga	3.22	10	8	2:02.98	(10 3/4 lengths)	Tyler Gaffalione	

Notes:
An (*) asterisk after the odds means Renegade was the post-time favourite.

== Pedigree ==
Pedigree of Renegade, bay colt, January 25, 2023
Sire Into Mischief (2005)	Harlan's Holiday (1999)	Harlan (1989)	Storm Cat (1983)
Sire Into Mischief (2005)	Harlan's Holiday (1999)	Harlan (1989)	Country Romance (1976)
Sire Into Mischief (2005)	Harlan's Holiday (1999)	Christmas in Aiken (1992)	Affirmed (1975)
Sire Into Mischief (2005)	Harlan's Holiday (1999)	Christmas in Aiken (1992)	Dowager (1980)
Sire Into Mischief (2005)	Leslie's Lady (1996)	Tricky Creek (1986)	Clever Trick (1976)
Sire Into Mischief (2005)	Leslie's Lady (1996)	Tricky Creek (1986)	Battle Creek Girl (1977)
Sire Into Mischief (2005)	Leslie's Lady (1996)	Crystal Lady (1990)	Stop the Music (1970)
Sire Into Mischief (2005)	Leslie's Lady (1996)	Crystal Lady (1990)	One Last Bird (1980)
Dam Spice Is Nice (2017)	Curlin (2004)	Smart Strike (1992)	Mr. Prospector (1970)
Dam Spice Is Nice (2017)	Curlin (2004)	Smart Strike (1992)	Classy 'n Smart (1981)
Dam Spice Is Nice (2017)	Curlin (2004)	Sherriff's Deputy (1994)	Deputy Minister (1979)
Dam Spice Is Nice (2017)	Curlin (2004)	Sherriff's Deputy (1994)	Barbarika (1985)
Dam Spice Is Nice (2017)	Dame Dorothy (2011)	Bernardini (2003)	A.P. Indy (1989)
Dam Spice Is Nice (2017)	Dame Dorothy (2011)	Bernardini (2003)	Cara Rafaela (1993)
Dam Spice Is Nice (2017)	Dame Dorothy (2011)	Vole Vole Monamour (1998)	Woodman (1983)
Dam Spice Is Nice (2017)	Dame Dorothy (2011)	Vole Vole Monamour (1998)	A Votre Sante (1993) (family: 25)
