= 2026 Kentucky Derby =

152nd running of the Kentucky Derby

152nd Kentucky Derby
- Kentucky Derby
- Grade I stakes race
- Location: Churchill Downs; Louisville, Kentucky, United States
- Date: May 2, 2026
- Distance: 1 1/4 mi (10 furlongs; 2,012 m)
- Winning horse: Golden Tempo
- Winning time: 2:02.27
- Final odds: 23-1
- Jockey: José Ortiz
- Trainer: Cherie DeVaux
- Owner: Phipps Stable (Daisy Phipps Pulito) & St. Elias Stable (Vincent Viola)
- Conditions: Fast
- Surface: Dirt
- Attendance: 150,000

The 2026 Kentucky Derby (branded as the 152nd Running of the Kentucky Derby presented by Woodford Reserve for sponsorship reasons) was the 152nd running of the Kentucky Derby. It took place on May 2, 2026, at Churchill Downs in Louisville, Kentucky. Golden Tempo won the race with time 2:02.27. As a result, Golden Tempo trainer Cherie DeVaux became the first woman trainer to win the Derby.

== Qualification and entries ==
The 2026 Road to the Kentucky Derby was a series of races through which horses qualified for the Derby. The field for the Derby was limited to 20 horses, with up to four 'also eligibles' in case of a late withdrawal from the field. There were three separate paths for horses to take to qualify for the Derby: the main Road consisting of races in North America, the Japan Road consisting of four races in Japan, and the Euro/MidEast road consisting of ten races in England, Ireland, United Arab Emirates and France. The top five finishers in the specified races received points, with higher points awarded in the major prep races in March and April. Earnings in non-restricted stakes races acted as a tie breaker.

The field was drawn on April 25. A full field of 20 horses was selected, in addition to four also-eligible (AE) entries, three of whom drew into the race after three horses in the main field scratched the week prior to the race.

== Results ==
At the initial load in, Great White, expected to start at the 21 post, became startled, reared, and fell backwards, throwing off his jockey Alex Achard and landing on his back. Neither Great White nor Achard appeared injured, but veterinarians scratched Great White from the race out of caution.

All of the previously loaded horses were pulled back out of the starting gate to warm up and then reloaded after a pause to have Great White escorted off the track. At the start, Six Speed took the early lead, with So Happy and Danon Bourbon following. Four horses, including Golden Tempo and Albus, hung well behind the rest of the field entering the first turn. Renegade was also one of the last runners in the early stages, having been bumped several times at the start by horses on his outside. Six Speed continued to hold the lead through the far turn, when Danon Bourbon moved ahead to take the lead at the mile mark. As the field reached the stretch, the horses that had been held back began to charge forward. Ocelli briefly took the lead before Renegade and Golden Tempo moved ahead of him. Golden Tempo and Renegade then battled for the rest of the race, with Golden Tempo prevailing by a neck. His victory made his trainer Cherie DeVaux the first woman trainer to win the Kentucky Derby and only the second woman trainer to win any of the American Triple Crown races, after Jena Antonucci in the 2023 Belmont Stakes. It was also a first Kentucky Derby victory for jockey José Ortiz, barely beating his brother Irad who was riding Renegade.

Finish	Program number	Horse	Qualifying points	Trainer	Jockey	Morning line odds	Final odds	Margin (lengths)	Winnings
1	19	Golden Tempo	60	Cherie DeVaux	José Ortiz	30–1	23.12		$3,100,000
2	1	Renegade	125	Todd Pletcher	Irad Ortiz Jr.	4–1	5.65	Neck	$1,000,000
3	22	Ocelli	25	Whit Beckman	Tyler Gaffalione (Note: On Thursday, April 30, trainer Whit Beckman announced that Tyler Gaffalione, who was originally named aboard Fulleffort, would replace Joe Ramos as jockey of Ocelli.)	50–1	70.50	1	$500,000
4	12	Chief Wallabee	50	Bill Mott	Junior Alvarado	8–1	7.31	3	$250,000
5	7	Danon Bourbon	Japan	Manabu Ikezoe	Atsuya Nishimura	20–1	12.66	3	$150,000
6	11	Incredibolt	60	Riley Mott	Jaime Torres	20–1	23.70	4	
7	6	Commandment	150	Brad Cox	Luis Saez	6–1	6.18	5 1/4	
8	10	Wonder Dean	E/ME	Daisuke Takayanagi	Ryusei Sakai	30–1	26.77	7 1/4	
9	8	So Happy	115	Mark Glatt	Mike Smith	15–1	5.90	7 1/2	
10	15	Emerging Market	100	Chad Brown	Flavien Prat	15–1	8.78	7 3/4	
11	18	Further Ado	135	Brad Cox	John Velazquez	6–1	5.05	7 3/4	
12	14	Potente	100	Bob Baffert	Juan Hernandez	20–1	17.89	8 1/4	
13	17	Six Speed	E/ME	Bhupat Seemar	Brian Hernandez Jr.	50–1	38.70	17 1/4	
14	23	Robusta	25	Doug O'Neill	Cristian Torres (Note: On Friday, May 1, trainer Doug O'Neill announced that Cristian Torres, who was originally named aboard Right to Party, would replace Emisael Jaramillo as jockey of Robusta.)	50–1	70.01	17 1/2	
15	2	Albus	100	Riley Mott	Manny Franco	30–1	48.67	20 1/4	
16	3	Intrepido	38	Jeff Mullins	Hector Berrios	50–1	52.85	33 1/2	
17	4	Litmus Test	34	Bob Baffert	Martin Garcia	30–1	27.75	37 1/2	
18	16	Pavlovian	70	Doug O'Neill	Edwin Maldonado	30–1	50.52	48 1/2	
	5 - Scr (Note: Right to Party was scratched immediately before the deadline on Friday, May 1, after regulatory veterinarians concluded that there may have been clinical signs disposing him to injury should he have run in the Derby.)	~~Right to Party~~	~~65~~	~~Kenny McPeek~~	~~Christopher Elliott~~	~~30–1~~			
	9 - Scr (Note: The Puma was scratched on the morning of the Derby because of swelling in his leg due to a skin infection.)	~~The Puma~~	~~106~~	~~Gustavo Delgado~~	~~Javier Castellano~~	~~10–1~~			
	13 - Scr (Note: Silent Tactic was scratched from the event on Wednesday, April 29, after developing a bruised foot.)	~~Silent Tactic~~	~~100~~	~~Mark Casse~~	~~Cristian Torres~~	~~20–1~~			
	20 - Scr (Note: Fulleffort was scratched on Thursday, April 30, two days before the event after returning from a workout and "off" in his left hind leg. X-rays revealed a small bone chip.)	~~Fulleffort~~	~~110~~	~~Brad Cox~~	~~Tyler Gaffalione~~	~~20–1~~			
	21 - Scr (Note: Scratched at the gate after falling over and throwing off his jockey.)	Great White	30	John Eniss	Alex Achard	50–1			
	~~24 AE~~	~~Corona de Oro~~	~~6~~	~~Dallas Stewart~~	~~Brian Hernandez Jr.~~	~~50–1~~			

Track condition: Fast

Times: 1/4 mile – 22.68; 1/2 mile – 46.44; 3/4 mile – 1:10.90; mile – 1:36.45; final – 2:02.27.
Splits for each quarter-mile: (23.76) (24.46) (25.55) (25.82) (25.82)

Note:

Source: Equibase chart

=== Payouts ===
The table below provides the Kentucky Derby payout schedule for a $2 stake.

Program number	Horse name	Win	Place	Show
19	Golden Tempo	$48.24	$19.14	$11.90
1	Renegade		$7.14	$5.46
22	Ocelli			$36.34

- $2 Exacta (19–1): $278.86
- $0.50 Trifecta (19–1–22): $5,625.39
- $1 Superfecta (19–1–22–12): $94,489.95
- $1 Super High Five (19–1–22–12–7): $1,777,720

Preceded by 2025 Belmont Stakes	Triple Crown	Succeeded by 2026 Preakness Stakes
