= Senor Buscador =

American thoroughbred racehorse (foaled 2018)

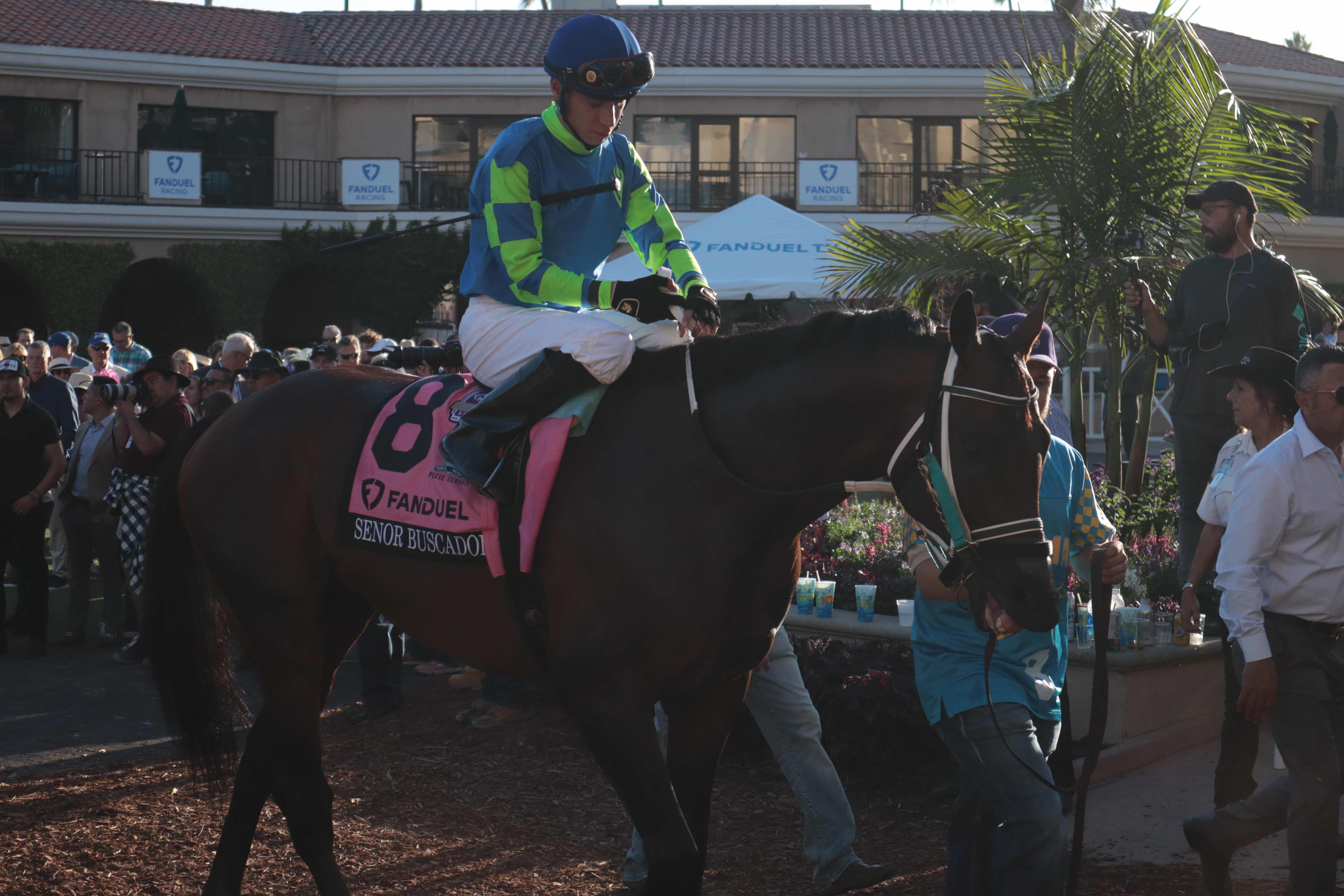
- Senor Buscador before the 2023 Pacific Classic
- Breed: Thoroughbred
- Sire: Mineshaft
- Grandsire: A.P. Indy
- Dam: Rose's Desert
- Damsire: Desert God
- Sex: Stallion
- Foaled: May 6, 2018; Kentucky
- Color: Bay
- Breeder: Joe R Peacock Sr. & Joe R Peacock Jr.
- Owner: Joe R. Peacock Jr.
- Trainer: Todd W Fincher
- Record: 23: 7 - 2 - 3
- Earnings: US$12,944,247

Major wins
- Remington Springboard Mile Stakes (2020); Ack Ack Stakes (2022); San Diego Handicap (2023); Saudi Cup (2024)
- Last updated on December 7, 2024

Senor Buscador (foaled May 6, 2018) is an American thoroughbred racehorse and breeding stallion most famous for winning the 2024 Saudi Cup. He has competed at 11 different racetracks in the United States, as well as in Saudi Arabia and Dubai. His name is a homage to his lineage; "Señor Buscador" roughly translates in English to "Mr. Prospector," which traces to both sides of his pedigree.

== Background ==
Senor Buscador is one of seven G1 winners sired by the 2003 American Horse of the Year Mineshaft. His dam, Rose's Desert, was a multiple black type winning New Mexico bred.

Trainer Todd Fincher (a retired Quarter Horse jockey) and owner/breeder Joe Peacock Sr. found success in Rose's Desert's previous foals, including Sunland Derby winner Runaway Ghost.

Senor Buscador was bred by Joe Peacock Sr. and his son Joe Peacock. He was the last horse bred before Joe Peacock Sr.'s death.

== Racing career ==
=== Two-year-old season ===
Senor Buscador's two starts as a juvenile were at Remington Park. The original plan had been to run him at Sunland Park, where Todd Fincher and the Peacock family were based. However, the track was closed due to the COVID pandemic and he was shipped to Remington Park. On November 6, 2020, he made a winning debut in a 5 1/2 furlong Maiden Special Weight.

One month later, he secured a maiden stakes victory in the Remington Springboard Mile. The race carried 10 qualifying points towards the Kentucky Derby for the winner. However, Senor Buscador was ineligible for those points having raced on Lasix.

=== Three-year-old season ===
The 2021 Kentucky Derby was the primary goal for Senor Buscador in his three-year-old season. He made his seasonal bow in the Risen Star Stakes where he sustained a suspensory injury to his right front leg immediately putting him off the derby trail. A subsequent injury to a hock in a stall accident further delayed his return and he wasn't seen again until his four-year-old season.

=== Four-year-old season ===
Despite a long layoff, Senor Buscador made a winning return at Lone Star Park. He contested the San Diego Handicap and the Pat O'Brien before winning the Ack Ack Stakes at Churchill Downs. This was his first graded stakes victory and put him on equal status with his older half-brother, Runaway Ghost. It was the second graded stakes victory for Joe Peacock Sr and trainer Todd Fincher.

The Ack Ack Stakes guaranteed Senor Buscador entry into the Breeders' Cup Dirt Mile. He broke slowly and never threatened the eventual winner Cody's Wish.

=== Five-year-old season ===
The entire five-year-old campaign commenced in winning fashion at Sunland Park in the Curibot Handicap. That four-length victory was a pipe opener to the Oaklawn Handicap and the Hollywood Gold Cup. Senor Buscador was unplaced in both events before a then career-best performance delivered victory in the San Diego Handicap.

The Breeders' Cup Classic was singled out as Senor Buscador's end-of-season target. He returned to Del Mar a month after the San Diego Handicap for the Pacific Classic, where he closed from last to finish fourth. He then finished third on a wet track in the Awesome Again Stakes.

For the second successive season, Senor Buscador contested a Breeders’ Cup race, but could only manage seventh in the Classic. He shipped across the country to Aqueduct Racetrack, the 10th racetrack he had competed at in only 16 career starts, and finished second in the Cigar Mile Handicap.

=== Six-year-old season ===
Senor Buscador arrived early for the 2024 Pegasus World Cup. While his connections were confident that he could run well, there was some concern about the suitability of his racing style at Gulfstream Park, a racetrack with a reputation for favoring speed horses and not closers.

Despite this, Senor Buscador rallied from 12 1/2 lengths off the pace to close to within a neck of leader and eventual winner National Treasure. It was one of the best performances of his career and earned him an invitation to the 2024 Saudi Cup, the richest horse race in the world

The Friday before the Saudi Cup, a deal was completed that would see Sharaf Mohammed S. Al-Hariri lease a minor share in the racing interests of Senor Buscador while he was competing in the Middle East. The deal was exclusive of any stake in his potential breeding value.

On race day, he was considered an outsider at 13-1 with the 6-5 favorite being another American horse, White Abarrio, who had defeated Senor Buscador by 5 1/4 lengths in the Breeders' Cup Classic.

Other Saudi Cup contenders included 2023 Dubai World Cup winner Ushba Tesoro, 2023 UAE Derby winner Derma Sotogake, and the horse who beat him in his previous start, National Treasure.

Saudi Crown and National Treasure set a fast pace. Senor Buscador settled last. With 300 yards to run, Senor Buscador still had most of the field to pass. He and Ushba Tesoro were hitting top gear. With 50 yards still to race, Senor Buscador was fourth, Ushba Tesoro second with Saudi Crown still in front. Ushba Tesoro surged past the Saudi Crown temporarily taking the lead before he was claimed in the shadows of the post by Senor Buscador.

The 2024 Saudi Cup was the fastest edition of the race with Senor Buscador setting a stakes record time of 1:49.50. The race was also won by the smallest winning margin in the event's history.

It was the first Grade 1 win for the horse, trainer, and owner and their first victory outside of America.

Trainer Fincher was quoted after the race, "I'm about to cry, It's amazing. He's never got the credit he deserves, I'm so proud of the horse. I didn't believe, something always happened to him. He always runs well and hard. We knew he'd run good, we had to hope for the right set-up and we got it.”

Senor Buscador's next race was the Dubai World Cup at Meydan Racecourse where he was attempting to become the first horse to win both the Saudi Cup and Dubai World Cup - the two richest dirt races in the world. He finished third to long-margin winner Laurel River.

Senor Buscador raced four more times in 2024, placing fourth in the Pat O'Brien Stakes before finishing off the board in the California Crown Stakes, Breeders' Cup Classic and Cigar Mile Handicap.

== Retirement and stud career ==
On January 19, 2025, owner Joe R. Peacock Jr. wrote on X that Senor Buscador, who was preparing for the Pegasus World Cup and a potential seven-year-old season, had retired after his team were not satisfied with how the horse pulled up after a workout.

Senor Buscador was shipped to Lexington, Kentucky for the 2025 breeding season, although a stud deal had not been announced. He will stand his first breeding season in 2025 at Lane's End Farm for $7,500, LFSN alongside his sire, Mineshaft.

== Pedigree ==
Pedigree of Senor Buscador
Sire Mineshaft dk.b. 1999	A.P. Indy dk.b. 1989	Seattle Slew	Bold Reasoning
Sire Mineshaft dk.b. 1999	A.P. Indy dk.b. 1989	Seattle Slew	My Charmer
Sire Mineshaft dk.b. 1999	A.P. Indy dk.b. 1989	Weekend Surprise	Secretariat
Sire Mineshaft dk.b. 1999	A.P. Indy dk.b. 1989	Weekend Surprise	Lassie Dear
Sire Mineshaft dk.b. 1999	Prospectors Delite ch. 1989	Mr. Prospector	Raise a Native
Sire Mineshaft dk.b. 1999	Prospectors Delite ch. 1989	Mr. Prospector	Gold Digger
Sire Mineshaft dk.b. 1999	Prospectors Delite ch. 1989	Up the Flagpole	Hoist the Flag
Sire Mineshaft dk.b. 1999	Prospectors Delite ch. 1989	Up the Flagpole	The Garden Club
Dam Rose's Desert dk.b. 2008	Desert God b. 1991	Fappiano	Mr. Prospector
Dam Rose's Desert dk.b. 2008	Desert God b. 1991	Fappiano	Killaloe
Dam Rose's Desert dk.b. 2008	Desert God b. 1991	Blush With Pride	Blushing Groom
Dam Rose's Desert dk.b. 2008	Desert God b. 1991	Blush With Pride	Best in Show
Dam Rose's Desert dk.b. 2008	Miss Glen Rose	Peaks and Valleys	Mt. Livermore
Dam Rose's Desert dk.b. 2008	Miss Glen Rose	Peaks and Valleys	Strike a Balance
Dam Rose's Desert dk.b. 2008	Miss Glen Rose	Snippet	Alysheba
Dam Rose's Desert dk.b. 2008	Miss Glen Rose	Snippet	Pert

- Senor Buscador is inbred 3x4 to Mr. Prospector and 4x5 to Blushing Groom, meaning both horses' names appear twice on a five-generation pedigree.
