= Arcangelo (horse) =

American thoroughbred racehorse

- Sire: Arrogate
- Grandsire: Unbridled's Song
- Dam: Modeling
- Damsire: Tapit
- Sex: Ridgling
- Foaled: May 11, 2020 (age 6); Kentucky, U.S.
- Country: United States
- Color: Grey/Roan
- Breeder: Don Alberto Corporation (KY)
- Owner: Blue Rose Farm
- Trainer: Jena Antonucci
- Record: 6: 4-1-0
- Earnings: $1,754,900

Major wins
- Peter Pan Stakes (2023); Belmont Stakes (2023); Travers Stakes (2023)

Awards
- American Champion Three-Year-Old Male Horse (2023)
- Last updated on 30 January 2024

Arcangelo is a retired Champion American three-year-old thoroughbred race horse who won the 2023 Belmont Stakes and Travers Stakes.

== Background ==
Arcangelo is a gray ridgling from the second crop of 2016 Travers Stakes and Breeders' Cup Classic champion Arrogate, who was named that year's Longines World's Best Racehorse and had a short-lived stud career before dying in 2020. On his dam's side, Arcangelo is a grandson of Tapit. Jon Ebbert purchased him for $35,000 from Gainesway's consignment at the 2021 September Yearling Sale at Keeneland.

Arcangelo was bred and foaled in Kentucky by Don Alberto, an international breeding and racing operation whose proprietors are mother and son Chilean nationals Liliana Solari and Carlos Heller Solari. Arcangelo's Belmont Stakes win marked their first Grade I victory in the United States with a U.S.-bred horse.

== Racing career ==
During his 3-year-old season prior to the Belmont, Arcangelo was victorious in the 2023 Peter Pan Stakes which is also run at Belmont Park. He did not run in either of the previous legs of the Triple Crown.

The horse is trained by Jena Antonucci, the first woman to train a winner of an American Triple Crown race, namely the Belmont Stakes, in 2023. The horse was ridden in the 2023 Belmont Stakes by jockey Javier Castellano, who also previously rode him to a win in the Peter Pan Stakes. Arcangelo started at odds of 7–1 in winning the Belmont.

He was shipped to Saratoga Race Course, where he spent the summer of 2023 preparing for the Travers Stakes. In his final race, Arcangelo won the Travers by one length in a time of 2:02.23 over a muddy track.

He was awarded the Eclipse Award as the American Champion Three-Year-Old Male Horse for 2023.

== Retirement and stud career ==
On October 16, 2023, as Arcangelo was training for the Breeders' Cup Classic, owner Jon Ebbert announced that the horse would enter stud at Lane's End Farm in Versailles, Kentucky upon the conclusion of his racing career.

On October 30, 2023, with the Breeders' Cup approaching, Antonucci told reporters that she had skipped two days of training for Arcangelo after the horse developed what was described as "a little warmth" in his left hind foot. She added she was still planning to enter Arcangelo into the Breeders' Cup Classic draw, which occurred that evening. The following morning, Antonucci announced that Arcangelo would scratch from the Classic, saying that while the horse's foot showed some improvement, the team needed to fully diagnose the status of his health. She said that with the Breeders' Cup Classic so close, they had run out of time. Ebbert then said that Arcangelo would be retired from racing and head to Lane's End for stud duty, as was announced two weeks earlier.

== Statistics ==
Date	Distance	Race	Grade	Track	Odds	Field	Finish	Winning Time	Winning (Losing) Margin	Jockey	Ref
2022 – Two-year-old season
Dec 17, 2022	6 furlongs	Maiden Special Weight		Gulfstream Park	2.00	8	2	1:11.82	(2 3/4 lengths)	Jose Ortiz	
2023 – Three-year-old season
Jan 14, 2023	1 mile	Maiden Special Weight		Gulfstream Park	9.70	11	4	1:39.18	(2 3/4 lengths)	Jose Ortiz	
Mar 18, 2023	1 mile	Maiden Special Weight		Gulfstream Park	2.00	7	1	1:34.82	3 1/2 lengths	Javier Castellano	
May 13, 2023	1 1/8 miles	Peter Pan Stakes	III	Belmont Park	2.75	8	1	1:49.71	head	Javier Castellano	
Jun 10, 2023	1 1/2 miles	Belmont Stakes	I	Belmont Park	7.90	9	1	2:29.23	1 1/2 lengths	Javier Castellano	
Aug 26, 2023	1 1/4 miles	Travers Stakes	I	Saratoga	2.70	7	1	2:02.23	1 length	Javier Castellano	

Notes:
An (*) asterisk after the odds means Arcangelo was the post-time favorite.

== Pedigree ==
Pedigree of Arcangelo (USA), grey/roan ridgling, May 11, 2020
Sire Arrogate (2013)	Unbridled's Song (1993)	Unbridled* (1987)	Fappiano (1977)
Sire Arrogate (2013)	Unbridled's Song (1993)	Unbridled* (1987)	Gana Facil (1981)
Sire Arrogate (2013)	Unbridled's Song (1993)	Trolley Song (1983)	Caro (IRE) (1967)
Sire Arrogate (2013)	Unbridled's Song (1993)	Trolley Song (1983)	Lucky Spell (1971)
Sire Arrogate (2013)	Bubbler (2006)	Distorted Humor (1993)	Forty Niner (1985)
Sire Arrogate (2013)	Bubbler (2006)	Distorted Humor (1993)	Danzig's Beauty (1987)
Sire Arrogate (2013)	Bubbler (2006)	Grechelle (1995)	Deputy Minister* (CAN) (1979)
Sire Arrogate (2013)	Bubbler (2006)	Grechelle (1995)	Meadow Star (1988)
Dam Modeling (2012)	Tapit (2001)	Pulpit (1994)	A.P. Indy (1989)
Dam Modeling (2012)	Tapit (2001)	Pulpit (1994)	Preach (1989)
Dam Modeling (2012)	Tapit (2001)	Tap Your Heels (1996)	Unbridled* (1987)
Dam Modeling (2012)	Tapit (2001)	Tap Your Heels (1996)	Ruby Slippers (1982)
Dam Modeling (2012)	Teeming (2001)	Storm Cat (1983)	Storm Bird (CAN) (1978)
Dam Modeling (2012)	Teeming (2001)	Storm Cat (1983)	Terlingua (1976)
Dam Modeling (2012)	Teeming (2001)	Better Than Honour (1996)	Deputy Minister* (CAN) (1979)
Dam Modeling (2012)	Teeming (2001)	Better Than Honour (1996)	Blush With Pride (1979)(family 8-f)

- Arcangelo is inbred 3S × 4D to Unbridled, meaning this horse is found once in the third generation on the sire side, and once in the 4th generation on the dam side. Arcangelo is also inbred and 4S × 4D to Deputy Minister, meaning this horse is found twice in the 4th generation, once on the sire side and once on the dam side.
