= Blush With Pride =

American Thoroughbred racehorse

- Sire: Blushing Groom
- Grandsire: Red God
- Dam: Best In Show
- Damsire: Traffic Judge
- Sex: Mare
- Foaled: June 5, 1979
- Died: August 16, 2005 (aged 26)
- Country: United States
- Colour: Chestnut
- Breeder: Mr. and Mrs. Darrell Brown
- Trainer: D. Wayne Lukas
- Record: 16: 6-4-2
- Earnings: $536,807

Major wins
- Santa Susana Stakes (1982); Ashland Stakes (1982); Kentucky Oaks (1982); Golden Harvest Handicap (1982)
- Last updated on June 8, 2018

Blush With Pride (June 5, 1979 – August 16, 2005) was an American Thoroughbred racehorse. A winner of the Kentucky Oaks, Blush With Pride won graded stakes races on both dirt and turf during her racing career. She later went on to become an important broodmare.

== Background ==
Blush With Pride was a chestnut mare bred in Kentucky by Darrell and Lendy Brown. She is from the first crop of Blushing Groom, a French-bred stallion who won four French Group 1 races at age two and the Poule d'Essai des Poulains at age three. He was named the French champion 2-year-old male in 1976 and the French, English and European champion miler in 1977. Her dam, Best In Show, won the Comely Stakes at Aqueduct in 1968. As a broodmare, she also produced Sex Appeal, the dam of Try My Best and El Gran Senor; Irish champion 2-year-old male Malinowski; Minnie Hauk, the dam of Aviance; Monroe, the dam of Xaar; Gielgud, winner of the Champagne Stakes in England; and Nijinsky's Best, dam of Yagli. Due in part to Blush With Pride's success, Best In Show was named the 1982 Kentucky Broodmare of the Year.

As a yearling, Blush With Pride was purchased at the Keeneland July yearling sale by her eventual trainer D. Wayne Lukas for $650,000 on behalf of Leonard K. Firestone, the father of Lendy Brown.

== Racing career ==
=== 1981: two-year-old season ===
Blush With Pride made her first start on October 2, 1981, in a maiden special weight race at Santa Anita Park, where she finished sixth. She followed up with a third-place run in another Santa Anita maiden special weight on October 23, before breaking her maiden on November 7. From there, she ran second in the Turkish Trousers Stakes at Hollywood Park on December 16. Following her two-year-old season, she was bought back from Leonard K. Firestone by her breeders, Darrell and Lendy Brown, and subsequently raced in the name of their Stonereath Farm.

=== 1982: three-year-old season ===
Blush With Pride began her three-year-old campaign with two allowance races at Santa Anita, finishing second on January 3 and first on January 28. She ran second in the Santa Ysabel Stakes before winning the Santa Susana Stakes, now known as the Santa Anita Oaks. She was then sent east for another victory in the Ashland Stakes at Keeneland on April 14 in preparation for the April 30 Kentucky Oaks. In the Kentucky Oaks, Blush With Pride was sent off at odds of 2–1 against six other fillies, winning by 3/4 lengths over race favorite and 1981 champion two-year-old filly Before Dawn.

Following her Oaks victory, Blush With Pride was shipped to Belmont Park for the Mother Goose Stakes, where she finished third. She then finished fifth in the Coaching Club American Oaks before a six-week layoff. She was then sent to Del Mar for the Del Mar Oaks. Following her fifth-place finish, her connections decided to try racing her on turf and entered her in the Grade III Golden Harvest Handicap at Louisiana Downs, which she won. She was next tried against males in the Super Derby, also at Louisiana Downs, but finished fifth. Her final start was a second-place finish to champion older female Track Robbery in the Spinster Stakes at Keeneland.

Blush With Pride was rated at 120 pounds on the Daily Racing Form's Free Handicap for three-year-old fillies, the third highest weight below champion Christmas Past and Cupecoy's Joy.

== Retirement ==
As a broodmare, Blush With Pride changed ownership several times. She produced 15 foals. Of those 15 foals, 11 raced, 9 won, and 3 won graded stakes.

She did not produce a stakes winner until her seventh foal, Smolensk, foaled in 1992. Sired by Danzig, Smolensk was a Group II winner in France. Like her dam, she was more successful later in her broodmare career and produced Can the Man, winner of the 2014 Affirmed Stakes, and listed stakes winner Martha's Moon. She also produced the unraced stallion Sought After, sire of Masochistic.

Blush With Pride's 1996 Deputy Minister filly, Better Than Honour, won the 1998 Demoiselle Stakes and went on to become a highly successful broodmare. Her progeny include Jazil and Rags to Riches, who won the Belmont Stakes in 2006 and 2007, respectively. Rags to Riches went on to become the 2007 American Champion Three-Year-Old Filly. Better Than Honour also produced Peter Pan Stakes winner Casino Drive and Breeders' Cup Marathon winner Man of Iron. In 2008, Better Than Honour sold for $14 million to Southern Equine Stables, setting a world record price for a broodmare or broodmare prospect at auction.

In 1997, Blush With Pride was sold, in foal to Deputy Minister, and was sent to Ireland. The foal she was carrying at the time, Turnberry Isle, became an Irish Group III winner.

In 1999, Blush With Pride produced Maryinsky, a Sadler's Wells filly who finished second in the 2001 Fillies' Mile. Maryinsky's first foal Peeping Fawn won the 2007 Irish Oaks and became the 2007 Cartier Champion Three-year-old Filly. Maryinsky is also the dam of Thewayyouare, a sire and winner of the 2007 Critérium Internationale.

Blush With Pride's 2000 foal by Dayjur, Fire Thunder, finished third in the Al Maktoum Challenge, Round 1 in 2000.

== Death ==
Blush With Pride died in Ireland on August 16, 2005. She had been pensioned from broodmare duty following the birth of her 2003 foal, a Sadler's Wells colt named Poland.

== Pedigree ==
Pedigree of Blush With Pride, chestnut mare, foaled June 5, 1979
| Sire Blushing Groom chestnut 1974 | Red God ch. 1954 | Nasrullah b. 1940 | Nearco |
| Sire Blushing Groom chestnut 1974 | Red God ch. 1954 | Nasrullah b. 1940 | Mumtaz Begum |
| Sire Blushing Groom chestnut 1974 | Red God ch. 1954 | Spring Run b. 1948 | Menow |
| Sire Blushing Groom chestnut 1974 | Red God ch. 1954 | Spring Run b. 1948 | Boola Brook |
| Sire Blushing Groom chestnut 1974 | Runaway Bride b. 1962 | Wild Risk b. 1940 | Rialto |
| Sire Blushing Groom chestnut 1974 | Runaway Bride b. 1962 | Wild Risk b. 1940 | Wild Violet |
| Sire Blushing Groom chestnut 1974 | Runaway Bride b. 1962 | Aimee b. 1957 | Tudor Minstrel |
| Sire Blushing Groom chestnut 1974 | Runaway Bride b. 1962 | Aimee b. 1957 | Emali |
| Dam Best in Show chestnut 1965 | Traffic Judge ch. 1952 | Alibhai ch. 1938 | Hyperion |
| Dam Best in Show chestnut 1965 | Traffic Judge ch. 1952 | Alibhai ch. 1938 | Teresina |
| Dam Best in Show chestnut 1965 | Traffic Judge ch. 1952 | Traffic Court br. 1938 | Discovery |
| Dam Best in Show chestnut 1965 | Traffic Judge ch. 1952 | Traffic Court br. 1938 | Traffic |
| Dam Best in Show chestnut 1965 | Stolen Hour ch. 1953 | Mr. Busher ch. 1946 | War Admiral |
| Dam Best in Show chestnut 1965 | Stolen Hour ch. 1953 | Mr. Busher ch. 1946 | Baby League |
| Dam Best in Show chestnut 1965 | Stolen Hour ch. 1953 | Late Date b. 1929 | Hourless |
| Dam Best in Show chestnut 1965 | Stolen Hour ch. 1953 | Late Date b. 1929 | Herd Girl (Family 8-f) |
