= Peppers Pride =

American-bred Thoroughbred racehorse

- Sire: Desert God
- Grandsire: Fappiano
- Dam: Lady Pepper
- Damsire: Chili Pepper Pie
- Sex: Mare
- Foaled: March 24, 2003
- Died: September 19, 2019 (aged 16); Taylor Made Farm; Nicholasville, Kentucky
- Country: United States
- Colour: Dark Bay or Brown
- Breeder: Joe Allen
- Owner: Joe Allen
- Trainer: Joel Marr
- Record: 19: 19-0-0
- Earnings: $1,066,085

Awards
- Overachiever of the Year 2008 Insider Award

Honors
- New Mexico-Bred Champion Older Mare (2007 & 2008); Pepper's Pride Handicap at Sunland Park
- Last updated on September 19, 2019

Peppers Pride (March 24, 2003 – September 19, 2019) was an undefeated, multiple stakes winning American Thoroughbred race horse.

Bred in New Mexico, Peppers Pride was by Desert God, out of Fappiano. Desert God's dam, Blush With Pride, was also the dam of Better Than Honour, a broodmare sold for $14 million at Fasig-Tipton in early November 2008. Peppers Pride's dam is the Chili Pepper Pie mare Lady Pepper, who placed in the 1990 Bluebonnet Stakes. Peppers Pride was her last foal. Joe Allen purchased Desert God from the University of Arizona.

== Race record ==
Peppers Pride raced only in her birth state, New Mexico, always against New Mexico-breds, and was ridden by the same jockey, Carlos Madeira, in every one of her 19 races. Trained by Joel Marr, she won races from five and a half furlongs to one mile in length, twelve times in stakes company. At age two, she made a four-wide rally on the turn to win the New Mexico Classic Cup Juvenile Fillies.

At age five, Peppers Pride tied Thoroughbreds Citation, Cigar, Mister Frisky, and Hallowed Dreams (and a paint horse, Got Country Grip) for longest consecutive winning streak by winning 16 consecutive North American races. On October 4, 2008, she entered the record books as the only American race horse since 1900 to win 17 consecutive races, while tying the modern-day international mark of Hong Kong-based Silent Witness. On November 8, 2008, she eclipsed Silent Witness' record with 18 consecutive wins, then extended the mark to 19 on December 14, 2008.

Several Thoroughbreds from other countries have won more consecutive races, the record being 56 by Camarero. Camarero raced in Puerto Rico in the 1950s. Also, several Standardbreds (harness racing) have won more consecutive races, led by Carty Nagle's 41 in 1937-1938.

The owner/breeder of Peppers Pride, Joe Allen of Abilene, Texas, said: “"We know that this filly is not Citation or Cigar. We haven't been the ones to compare her to those horses. We're just glad to have her."

She was nearly beaten in 2006 running in a prep allowance race when she got up by only a nose after a late run, but went on to win that year's New Mexico Cup Championship for Fillies and Mares by a length as the 11-10 favorite.

Called the “Queen of New Mexico Racing,” Peppers Pride was expected to try for her seventeenth win on July 27, 2008, in the $55,000 Lincoln Handicap at Ruidoso Downs, thereby beating the modern standing record. The Lincoln Handicap was a restricted six furlong race which the mare won in 2007 by one and three-quarters lengths. Peppers Pride would have been the 127-pound top weight, carrying at least 11 pounds more than any other horse entered. July 27 was her owner's 62nd birthday. But the track was inundated with rain from Hurricane Dolly just before the day of the race, and Peppers Pride did not run. In a six-furlong allowance race at Zia Park on October 4, 2008, she succeeded in her attempt to set the record for consecutive wins. Bringing out a capacity crowd, her record over the Hobbs oval at Zia was then seven-for-seven. After this, Peppers Pride was pointed again to the New Mexico Cup Championship for Fillies and Mares. On November 9, 2008, New Mexico Cup Day (with its $2 million in purses making that program the richest day for any state-bred racing program), she exceeded by 2 races the highest number of consecutive wins by any American Thoroughbred. Racing four wide, she made her move under Madeira in the final turn of the one-mile event, then was pressed by the pacesetter, La Sorpressa, but held her off by one length in a time of 1:38.20.

On December 14, 2008, Peppers Pride gave 7 to 12 pounds against a field in the $125,000 New Mexico State Racing Commission Handicap. By winning, she extended her record to 19 straight victories.

Allen announced he had retired his mare on January 16, 2009. "She’s smart, and you can rate her; you can really do anything with her,” Allen said. “She just seems like she wants to win. She’s a wonderful mare. We would love to retire her undefeated, but more than anything else, we want to retire her sound; she’s been so good to us. We’ve had a little criticism for not running her in open company and not running her in this or that and all this other stuff. But Joel Marr said it best, ‘If it’s so easy, I’m surprised there haven’t been 100 of them like her.’”

Peppers Pride won the horseraceinsider.com award for Overachiever of the Year 2008 Insider Award: "To the history making little New Mexico-bred filly that could, Peppers Pride."

== Breeding record ==
Peppers Pride was retired to Taylor Made Farm in Nicholasville, Kentucky. At WinStar Farm in Versailles, Kentucky, she was bred to Tiznow in 2009 but lost the foal. On March 27, 2010, she was bred to Distorted Humor, also standing at WinStar, and produced a chestnut filly on February 19, 2011. She was bred back to Distorted Humor and produced a colt in 2012. Her next foal was a Malibu Moon colt born on February 22, 2013. She was then bred to the Darley stallion Hard Spun, producing a colt on March 1, 2014. In March 2016 she was confirmed in foal to 2015 Triple Crown champion American Pharoah, but lost the foal due to a twisted umbilical cord. Bred back to American Pharoah, Peppers Pride produced a foal in 2018, named American Pepper. Her last foal, a filly, was by California Chrome and was born on February 10, 2019, just seven months before her death.

== Death ==
Peppers Pride was euthanized on September 19, 2019, at Taylor Made Farm, due to complications from laminitis.

== See also ==
- List of leading Thoroughbred racehorses
