= Casino Drive =

American-bred Thoroughbred racehorse

Casino Drive カジノドライヴ
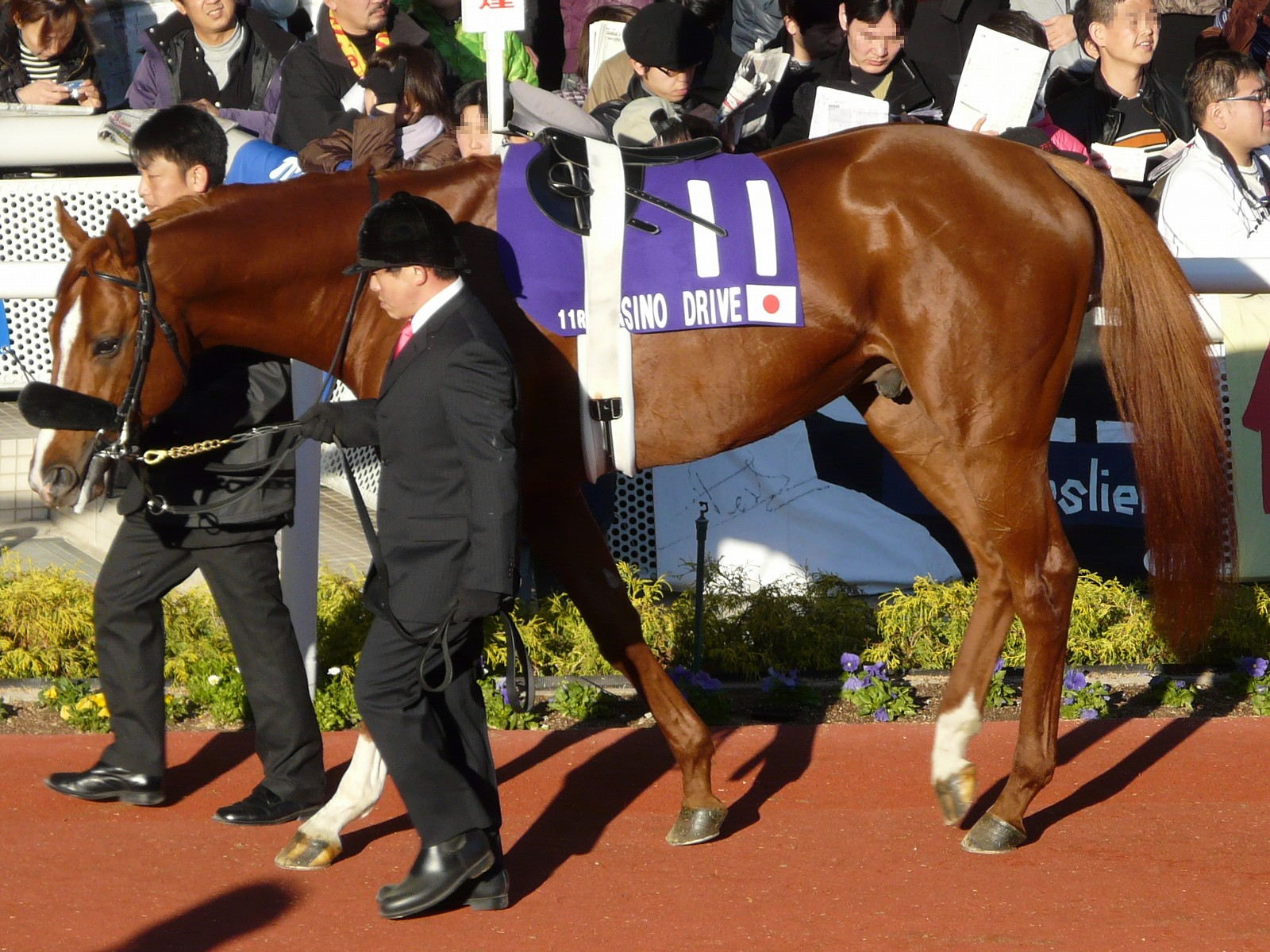
- Casino Drive in 2008
- Breed: Thoroughbred
- Sire: Mineshaft
- Grandsire: A. P. Indy
- Dam: Better Than Honour
- Damsire: Deputy Minister
- Sex: Stallion
- Foaled: March 7, 2005
- Died: August 5, 2019 (aged 14)
- Country: United States
- Colour: Chestnut
- Breeder: Shell Bloodstock
- Owner: Hidetoshi Yamamoto
- Racing colours
- Trainer: Kazuo Fujisawa
- Jockey: Kent Desormeaux; Katsumi Ando
- Record: 11: 4-1-1
- Earnings: $904,575

Major wins
- Peter Pan Stakes (2008)

Casino Drive (Japanese: カジノドライヴ, Hepburn: Kajino Doraivu; March 7, 2005 − August 5, 2019) was an American thoroughbred racehorse and breeding stallion.

== Background ==
Casino Drive was sired by 2003 United States Horse of the Year Mineshaft, out of the broodmare Better Than Honour, making him a half-brother to 2006 Belmont Stakes winner Jazil, and a three-quarter brother to 2007 Belmont Stakes winner Rags to Riches.

Purchased for $950,000 at the Keeneland September yearling sales and shipped to Japan by owner Hidetoshi Yamamoto, he was unraced until he was three years old.

== Racing career ==
=== 2008: Three-year-old season ===
Casino Drive made his debut in February on dirt at Kyoto, winning by 11 1/2 lengths under Yutaka Take.

Following his maiden win, he was shipped to the United States where, in his second career start, he won the Grade II Peter Pan Stakes by 5 3/4 lengths. He was ridden by Kent Desormeaux, rider of 2008 Kentucky Derby and Preakness winner Big Brown.

Casino Drive was scratched from the Belmont and unable to run due to a stone bruise to his left rear hoof.

After a lengthy wait for his return after the Belmont, Casino Drive was started in an allowance race in the fall season to qualify for the Breeders' Cup Classic, easily beating the field. Expected to give a good run for the $5 million Classic, Casino Drive, unbeaten in his three previous starts, was last after setting the pace mid-race. He ended his 2008 campaign with a 6th-place finish in the Japan Cup Dirt. The winner Kane Hekili, won his second Japan Cup Dirt title.

=== 2009: Four-year-old season ===
Casino Drive's first race of the 2009 season was the Alexandrite Stakes, an allowance race for four-year-olds and above. He was the heavy favorite to win, with odds of 1.2 compared to the second favorite, Dreamy Pegasus, odd's of 6.5. Casino Drive held a strong position throughout the entire race, and won with a margin of 3 1/2 lengths.

For his next start, Casino Drive entered the 2009 February Stakes at Tokyo Racecourse over 1600m. Casino Drive finished in 2nd place, a neck behind the upset winner Success Brocken and a head in front of the favorite Kane Hekili.

His final race of the year was the 2009 Dubai World Cup. Casino Drive had a disappointing showing, placing 8th with no challenge to the leader, Well Armed, who won by 14 lengths.

After the Dubai World Cup it was discovered that Casino Drive had developed flexor tendonitis in his front leg, and it was announced that he would undergo surgery. Therefore, he would not race in 2010.

=== 2011: Six-year-old season ===
Casino Drive had three starts in his six-year-old season and failed to win any races. His first start was on March 6 at the Nigawa Stakes over 2000m on dirt, where he finished a disappointing ninth place as the second favorite.

His next race was the Akhalteke Stakes on May 1. Casino Drive finished a head behind the second place runner, Toho Orvis, to place third.

Under a month later on May 29, Casino Drive started in the final race of his career, the Tsubasa Sho. Despite placing eighth, Casino Drive finished only 0.2 seconds behind the winner, Toho Orvis, due to the fact that first eight horses finished very close to one another.

== Statistics ==
The following table is based on information from netkeiba for Japanese races, and Equibase for American races.

Date	Track	Race	Grade	Distance	Field	Odds (Favorite)	Finish	Time	Margin (Winning)	Jockey	Winner (2nd place)
2008 – Three-year-old season
February 23	Kyoto	Debut		1800m	13	1.2 (1)	1st	1:54.4	(10+ lengths)	Yutaka Take	(Copano Akochan)
May 10	Belmont	Peter Pan Stakes	G2	1800m	9	1.25 (1)	1st	1:47.87	(5 3/4 lengths)	Kent Desormeaux	(Mint Lane)
October 12	Santa Anita	Allowance Stakes	Alw	1700m	7	0.4 (1)	1st	1:42.14	(3/4 length)	Victor Espinoza	(Dakota Phone)
October 25	Santa Anita	Breeders' Cup Classic	G1	2000m	12	9.9 (4)	12th	1:59.27	21 lengths	Victor Espinoza	Raven's Pass
December 7	Hanshin	Japan Cup Dirt	G1	1800m	15	7.1 (3)	6th	1:49.2	2 1/2 lengths	Katsumi Ando	Kane Hekili
2009 – Four-year-old season
January 24	Nakayama	Alexandrite Stakes	Alw	1800m	11	1.2 (1)	1st	1:49.9	(3 1/2 lengths)	Katsumi Ando	(Daiwa Rubia)
February 22	Tokyo	February Stakes	G1	1600m	16	5.0 (3)	2nd	1:34.6	neck	Katsumi Ando	Success Brocken
March 28	Nad Al Sheba	Dubai World Cup	G1	2000m	14	4.0 (2)	8th	2:01.01	27 lengths	Katsumi Ando	Well Armed
2011– Six-year-old season
March 6	Hanshin	Nigawa Stakes	Open	2000m	14	4.0 (2)	9th	2:05.6	11 1/4 lengths	Shinji Fujita	Wonder Acute
May 1	Tokyo	Akhalteke Stakes	Open	1400m	16	4.1 (2)	3rd	1:24.3	2 1/2 lengths	Katsumi Ando	Bright Isaac
May 29	Tokyo	Tsubasa Sho	Open	1400m	16	2.5 (1)	8th	1:23.9	3/4 length	Katsumi Ando	Toho Orvis

== Stud career ==
Casino Drive retired and stood stud at Shadai Stallion Station in 2011. Some of his progeny include:

c = colt, g = gelding

Foaled	Name	Sex	Major Wins
2013	Vengeance	c	Miyako Stakes, Sannomiya Stakes, Tempozan Stakes, Polaris Stakes
2016	Casino Fountain	c	Kawasaki Kinen (twice)
2017	Meisho Kazusa	c	Procyon Stakes, Urawa Kinen, Hakusan Daishoten
2013	Drive Knight	g	Subaru Stakes, Kibune Stakes, Hakobera Sho

Casino Drive died on August 5, 2019, but his death was not officially announced until the Japanese Studbook updated their database in March 2020.

== In popular culture ==
An anthropomorphized version of Casino Drive appears in Umamusume: Pretty Derby, voiced by Aimi, as a non-playable supporting character. She features in the "Beyond Dreams" training scenario, which involves players preparing their trainee Umamusume to compete overseas at the Breeders' Cup (in addition to their story careers).

== Pedigree ==
Pedigree of Casino Drive
Sire Mineshaft 1999 dk.b.	A.P. Indy; 1989 dk.b.	Seattle Slew	Bold Reasoning
Sire Mineshaft 1999 dk.b.	A.P. Indy; 1989 dk.b.	Seattle Slew	My Charmer
Sire Mineshaft 1999 dk.b.	A.P. Indy; 1989 dk.b.	Weekend Surprise	Secretariat
Sire Mineshaft 1999 dk.b.	A.P. Indy; 1989 dk.b.	Weekend Surprise	Lassie Dear
Sire Mineshaft 1999 dk.b.	Prospectors Delite; 1989 b.	Mr. Prospector	Raise a Native
Sire Mineshaft 1999 dk.b.	Prospectors Delite; 1989 b.	Mr. Prospector	Gold Digger
Sire Mineshaft 1999 dk.b.	Prospectors Delite; 1989 b.	Up the Flagpole	Hoist the Flag
Sire Mineshaft 1999 dk.b.	Prospectors Delite; 1989 b.	Up the Flagpole	The Garden Club
Dam Better Than Honour 1996 b.	Deputy Minister; 1979 dk.b.	Vice Regent	Northern Dancer
Dam Better Than Honour 1996 b.	Deputy Minister; 1979 dk.b.	Vice Regent	Victoria Regina
Dam Better Than Honour 1996 b.	Deputy Minister; 1979 dk.b.	Mint Copy	Bunty's Flight
Dam Better Than Honour 1996 b.	Deputy Minister; 1979 dk.b.	Mint Copy	Shakney
Dam Better Than Honour 1996 b.	Blush with Pride; 1979 ch.	Blushing Groom	Red God
Dam Better Than Honour 1996 b.	Blush with Pride; 1979 ch.	Blushing Groom	Runaway Bride
Dam Better Than Honour 1996 b.	Blush with Pride; 1979 ch.	Best In Show	Traffic Judge
Dam Better Than Honour 1996 b.	Blush with Pride; 1979 ch.	Best In Show	Stolen Hour
