= 2023 Preakness Stakes =

148th running Preakness Stakes

148th Preakness Stakes
- Preakness Stakes
- Grade I stakes race
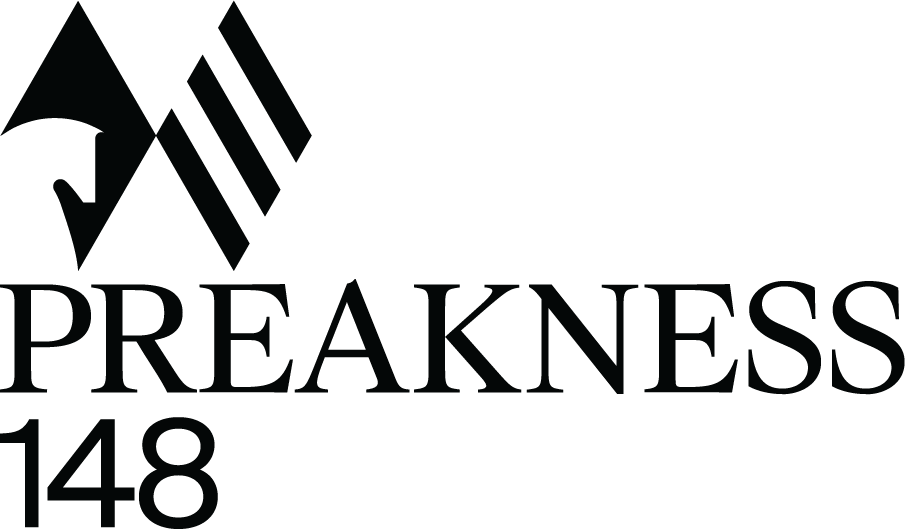
- "The Middle Jewel of the Triple Crown" "The Run for the Black-Eyed Susans"
- Location: Pimlico Race Course; Baltimore, Maryland, U.S.
- Date: May 20, 2023
- Distance: 1 3/16 mi (10 furlongs; 1,911 m)
- Winning horse: National Treasure
- Winning time: 1:55.12
- Final odds: 2.90
- Jockey: John R. Velazquez
- Trainer: Bob Baffert
- Owner: SF Racing, Starlight Racing, Medakat Stables, Robert E. Masterson, Stonestreet Stables, Jay A. Schoenfarber, Waves Edge Capital & Catherine Donovan
- Conditions: Fast
- Surface: Dirt

The 2023 Preakness Stakes was the 148th Preakness Stakes, a Grade I stakes race for three-year-old Thoroughbreds at a distance of 1 3/16 miles (10 furlongs; 1,911 meters). The race is one leg of the American Triple Crown and is held annually at Pimlico Race Course in Baltimore, Maryland. The Preakness Stakes is traditionally held on the third Saturday in May, two weeks after the Kentucky Derby. The 2023 edition was scheduled for May 20, with a post time of 7:01 p.m. EDT and television coverage by NBC. The race was won by National Treasure.

== Preparations ==
Preakness Weekend 2023 Graded Stakes Races, as detailed by Thoroughbred Owners and Breeders Association (TOBA), listed these races at Pimlico Race Course: May 19 2023 - three-year-old F SPR Division - Miss Preakness Stakes (a Grade 3 race on Black-Eyed Susan Stakes Day); May 20, 2023 - three-year-old R D Division - Preakness Stakes (Grade 1 race on Armed Forces Day). Reaching the 2023 Preakness Stakes Field is highly competitive and requires equestrian mental and physical readiness typically achieved by thoroughbred owners and breeders and their collaborative partnerships (e.g., Jockeys, sponsors, stables) at races that lead up to Preakness Weekend.

== Field ==
The field for the Preakness was drawn on Monday, May 15 with a field of eight. Mage, the Kentucky Derby winner and the only horse to come in the Preakness from the Derby, was named the 8-5 morning line favorite drawing post 3. This was the first Preakness in 75 years to include only one Derby participant.

== Result ==
Finish	Program Number	Horse	Jockey	Trainer	Morning Line Odds	Final Odds	Margin (Lengths)	Winnings
1	1	National Treasure	John R. Velazquez	Bob Baffert	4-1	2.90		$990,000
2	7	Blazing Sevens	Irad Ortiz Jr.	Chad C. Brown	6-1	4.90	head	$330,000
3	3	Mage	Javier Castellano	Gustavo Delgado	8-5	1.40	2 1/4	$181,500
4	5	Red Route One	Joel Rosario	Steven M. Asmussen	10-1	8.00	4 3/4	$99,000
5	2	Chase The Chaos	Sheldon Russell	Ed Mogar Jr.	50-1	10.50	12 1/4	$49,500
6	6	Perform	Feargal Lynch	Shug McGaughey	15-1	8.50	16 1/2	
7	4	Coffeewithchris	Jamie Rodriguez	John Salzman Jr.	20-1	10.50	19 3/4	
	Scratched	First Mission	Luis Saez	Brad H. Cox	5.2			

Track condition: Fast

Times: 1/4 mile – 0:23.95; 1/2 mile – 0:48.92; 3/4 mile – 1:13.49; mile – 1:37.07; final – 1:55.12.
Splits for each quarter-mile: (:23.95) (:24.97) (:24.57) (:23.58) (:18.05 for final 3/16)

== Payout ==
Pgm	Horse	Win	Place	Show
1	National Treasure	$7.80	$4.00	$2.60
7	Blazing Sevens	–	$5.00	$2.80
3	Mage	–	–	$2.40

- $1 Exacta (1–7) $15.90
- $1 Trifecta (1–7–3) $24.20
- $1 Superfecta (1–7–3–5) $72.40
- $1 Super High Five (1–7–3–5–2) $164.90

Preceded by 2023 Kentucky Derby	Triple Crown	Succeeded by 2023 Belmont Stakes
