= 2023 Belmont Stakes =

American horse race

155th Belmont Stakes
- Belmont Stakes
- Grade I stakes race
- Location: Belmont Park, Elmont, New York, United States
- Date: June 10, 2023
- Distance: 1 1/2 mi (12 furlongs; 2,414 m)
- Winning horse: Arcangelo
- Winning time: 2:29.23
- Final odds: 7.90 to 1
- Jockey: Javier Castellano
- Trainer: Jena M. Antonucci
- Owner: Blue Rose Farm
- Conditions: Fast
- Surface: Dirt
- Attendance: 48,089

The 2023 Belmont Stakes was the 155th running of the Belmont Stakes and the 112th time the event took place at Belmont Park. The 1 1/2 miles (12 furlongs; 2,414 meters) race, known as the "test of the champion", is the final leg in the American Triple Crown, open to three-year-old thoroughbreds. The race was won by Arcangelo.

The race took place on June 10, 2023, in Elmont, New York, with an actual start time of 6:50 p.m. EDT; television coverage was broadcast by Fox. It was a Grade I stakes race with a purse of $1.5 million. Entering the race, it was known that there would be no Triple Crown winner, as the Kentucky Derby and Preakness Stakes had already been won by different horses with the Kentucky Derby winner Mage finishing third in the Preakness while Preakness winner National Treasure did not run at the Kentucky Derby.

The 2023 Belmont celebrated the 50th anniversary of Secretariat's win of the 1973 Belmont Stakes to win the Triple Crown by 31 lengths. Tom Durkin, who retired in 2014, came out of retirement to call the stakes for the first time since the 2010 edition. This was also the final Belmont Stakes in the second iteration of Belmont Park.

== Field ==
A field of nine was drawn for the Belmont Stakes on Tuesday, June 6. Forte was named the morning line favorite at 5-2 drawing post no. 6 and Preakness winner National Treasure drew post 4 for the Belmont Stakes at odds of 5-1. Tapit Trice drew post no. 2 at odds of 3-1, while Angel of Empire drew post no. 8 at odds of 7-2. Arcangelo won, making his trainer Jena Antonucci the first female trainer to win the Belmont Stakes, which also made her the first female trainer to win any American Triple Crown race.

Notes:

† Hit Show & Angel of Empire Dead heated for 4th place.

*Jena Antonucci, trainer of Arcangelo, became the first female trainer to win the Belmont Stakes, which also made her the first female trainer to win any American Triple Crown race.

== Results ==
Finish	Program Number	Horse	Jockey	Trainer	Morning Line Odds	Final Odds	Margin (Lengths)	Winnings
1	3	Arcangelo	Javier Castellano	Jena Antonucci*	8-1	7.90		$900,000
2	6	Forte	Irad Ortiz Jr.	Todd A. Pletcher	5-2	2.25	1 1/2	$270,000
3	2	Tapit Trice	Luis Saez	Todd A. Pletcher	3-1	5.30	Nose	$150,000
4†	7	Hit Show	Manuel Franco	Brad H. Cox	10-1	9.10	3/4	$60,000
4†	8	Angel of Empire	Flavien Prat	Brad H. Cox	7-2	3.45	1 1/2	$60,000
6	4	National Treasure	John R. Velazquez	Bob Baffert	5-1	5.70	5	
7	5	Il Miracolo	Marcos Meneses	Antonio Sano	30-1	25.00	5	
8	9	Red Route One	Joel Rosario	Steven M. Asmussen	15-1	16.60	18	
9	1	Tapit Shoes	José Ortiz	Brad H. Cox	20-1	20.90	19 1/2	

Track condition: Fast

Times: 1/4 mile – 23.63; 1/2 mile – 47.69; 3/4 mile – 1:12.56; mile – 1:37.41; 1¼ miles – 2:02.68; final – 2:29.23

Splits for each quarter-mile: (24:06) (24:87) (24:85) (25:27) (26:55)

== Payouts ==
Based on a $2 bet:

Program Number	Horse name	Win	Place	Show
3	Arcangelo	$17.80	$7.20	$4.90
6	Forte		$4.30	$3.30
2	Tapit Trice			$4.10

- $1 Exacta $34.00 (3-6)
- $1 Trifecta $133.24 (3-6-2)
- $1 Superfecta $292.50 (3-6-2-7)
- $1 Superfecta $191.50 (3-6-2-8)

Preceded by 2023 Preakness Stakes	Triple Crown	Succeeded by 2024 Kentucky Derby
