= Lane's End Farm =

Thoroughbred horse breeding farm in Versailles, Kentucky

Coordinates: 38°05′49″N 84°42′55″W

- Company type: Horse breeding farm and Thoroughbred racing stable
- Industry: Thoroughbred horse racing
- Headquarters: Versailles, Kentucky
- Key people: Farish family.

Lane's End Farm is a Thoroughbred horse breeding farm in Versailles, Kentucky established in 1979. The original land was part of Bosque Bonita Farm and was originally owned by Abraham Buford, a Confederate Army general. The land was later bought by horseman John H. Morris.

Now owned and operated by the Farish family, Lane's End Farm has become one of the major breeding farms in North America.

== History ==
The original land was part of Bosque Bonita Farm, a name that means "beautiful woods" in Spanish and was originally owned by Abraham Buford, a Confederate Army general. The land was later bought by leading horseman, John H. Morris.

Leamington, sire of Aristides, winner of the first Kentucky Derby, stood at stud at Bosque Bonita Farm in 1866. Mannie Gray, dam of the great stallion Domino, was raised there.

In 1875, the year before the Battle of Little Big Horn, General George Custer came to Bosque Bonita Farm to buy cavalry remounts.

The farm was also home to a Springer Spaniel dog named Tug, who in 1989 mated with Millie, the famous White House dog owned by President George H. W. Bush. One of their pups, a female named Spot Fetcher, was born in the White House and later returned to live there with President George W. Bush.

The farm is currently owned and operated by the Farish family. The Farish family home, once known as Pleasant Lawn, was built in 1829.

== Stallions ==
=== Former stallions and notable residents ===
The farm has been home to a number of famous horses and stallions including 1987 Belmont Stakes winner Bet Twice, 1999 Kentucky Derby and Preakness Stakes winner Charismatic, 1999 Belmont Stakes winner Lemon Drop Kid, 1992 Belmont Stakes winner A. P. Indy, 1990 Preakness Stakes winner Summer Squall, 2003 Canadian Triple Crown winner Wando, champion sire Smart Strike, and European runner Law Society.

Stephen Got Even, the sire of American Champion Juvenile Stevie Wonderboy, Gr.I winner I Want Revenge, and dual Classic-placed First Dude, stood stallion duties at Lane's End. Pensioned from stud duty in 2015, Stephen Got Even is spending retirement at the farm, along with his sire A.P. Indy.

Curlin, the 2007 Preakness and Breeders' Cup Classic winner, U.S. Horse of the Year in 2007 and 2008, and became the leading money-winner in North American Thoroughbred racing history, holding that record until surpassed by California Chrome in 2016, and later Arrogate in 2017, began his stallion career at Lane's End before being moved to stand at Hill 'n' Dale Farms in 2016.

Zenyatta, the only mare to win the Breeders' Cup Classic, one of the few horses to win two different Breeders Cup events, one of the leading U.S. money earners, the first horse to break Cigar's 16 consecutive win streak, and the horse that broke the world record set by Rock of Gibraltar for consecutive Grade/Group I victories (later surpassed by Winx), resides there as a broodmare. She has lived there since her retirement in 2010. Like Zenyatta, the U.S. Champion 3-Yr-Old Filly of 2006 Wait A While also calls Lane's End home during her retirement.

Stallion City Zip stood at Lane's End for the majority of his stallion career, beginning in 2004 until his passing in 2017. A multiple graded stakes winner, City Zip was a half-brother to Hall of Fame champion Ghostzapper and graded stakes winner City Wolf. City Zip is most notably the sire of Breeders' Cup winners Work All Week, Dayatthespa, Finest City, and Catch A Glimpse, who was also crowned Canadian Horse of the Year, among other honors.

War Pass, 2007 American Champion Juvenile Male, stood at Lane's End until his death in 2010. Having a short stallion career, his best progeny include: Gr.I winner Java's War and Gr.II winner Revolutionary, who are now both stallions.

Discreetly Mine, a multiple graded stakes winner, stood as a stallion at Lane's End from 2011 to 2016, but was later sold to stand in Uruguay.

Lane's End Texas stood top Texas stallions Grasshopper, Too Much Bling, and Congaree until the Texas facility closed in 2016. The stallions were moved to stand at Valor Farm, also in Texas.

2024 Breeders' Cup Mile (G1T) winner More Than Looks will stand as a stallion at Lane's End from 2025 for $15,000 Live Foal Stands and Nurses (LFSN) after a tendon reinjury to his right foreleg.

=== Current stallions ===
As of the 2023 breeding season, the stallion roster is expected to be:

- Accelerate
- Candy Ride (ARG)
- Catalina Cruiser
- City of Light
- Connect
- Daredevil
- Flightline
- Game Winner
- Gift Box
- Honor A. P.
- Honor Code
- Lexitonian
- Liam's Map
- Mineshaft
- Quality Road
- The Factor
- Tonalist
- Twirling Candy
- Unified
- Union Rags
- West Coast

.
