= Jena Antonucci =

American horse trainer

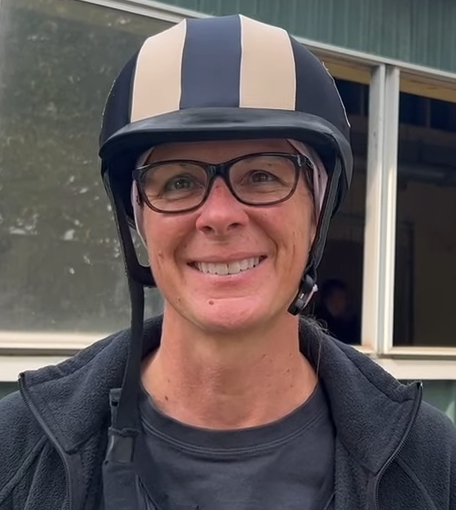
- Antonucci in 2023

Personal information
- Born: 1975 or 1976 (age 50–51)
- Occupation: Trainer

Horse racing career
- Sport: Horse racing
- Career winnings: $7,385,806
- Career wins: 165+ (ongoing)

Major racing wins
- American Classics: Belmont Stakes (2023); Travers Stakes (2023); Graded Stakes Wins: Turf Monster Stakes (2016); Peter Pan Stakes (2023)

Significant horses
- Arcangelo, Doctor J Dub
- Updated on 26 August 2023

Jena Antonucci (born 1975 or 1976) is an American thoroughbred horse trainer. She is best known as the first woman to train a winner of an American Triple Crown race, having prepared Arcangelo for his victory in the 2023 Belmont Stakes.

Antonucci learned about training thoroughbred horses under the guidance of Hall of Fame Trainer D. Wayne Lukas after riding and training show horses at a young age. She won her first career race as a trainer at Tampa Bay Downs on March 7, 2010. Her first career graded stakes winner was Doctor J Dub, who won the Turf Monster Stakes at Parx Racing in 2016.

In 2023 her three-year-old Arcangelo won the Peter Pan Stakes at Belmont Park. He next competed in the Belmont Stakes, where he was Antonucci's first ever Grade 1 starter. Arcangelo won the Belmont and she became the first woman trainer to have a horse win. Later that year Arcangelo won the Travers Stakes, making Antonucci the second female trainer to win the Travers in its 154-year history. As of the 2023 Travers victory, Antonucci has won 165 races with career earnings of over $7 million.

Antonucci was awarded with the 2023 Big Sport of Turfdom Award by the Turf Publicists of America, presented to individuals that enhance coverage of Thoroughbred racing through cooperation with media and racing publicists.

In 2025, one of her trained horses, Bee a Queen, tested positive for lidocaine, a controlled substance. Antonucci was suspended for 15 days, which she appealed to the Federal Trade Commission. Antonucci claimed a jockey using the substance topically inadvertently transferred it to the horse.
