= Jazil =

American-bred Thoroughbred racehorse

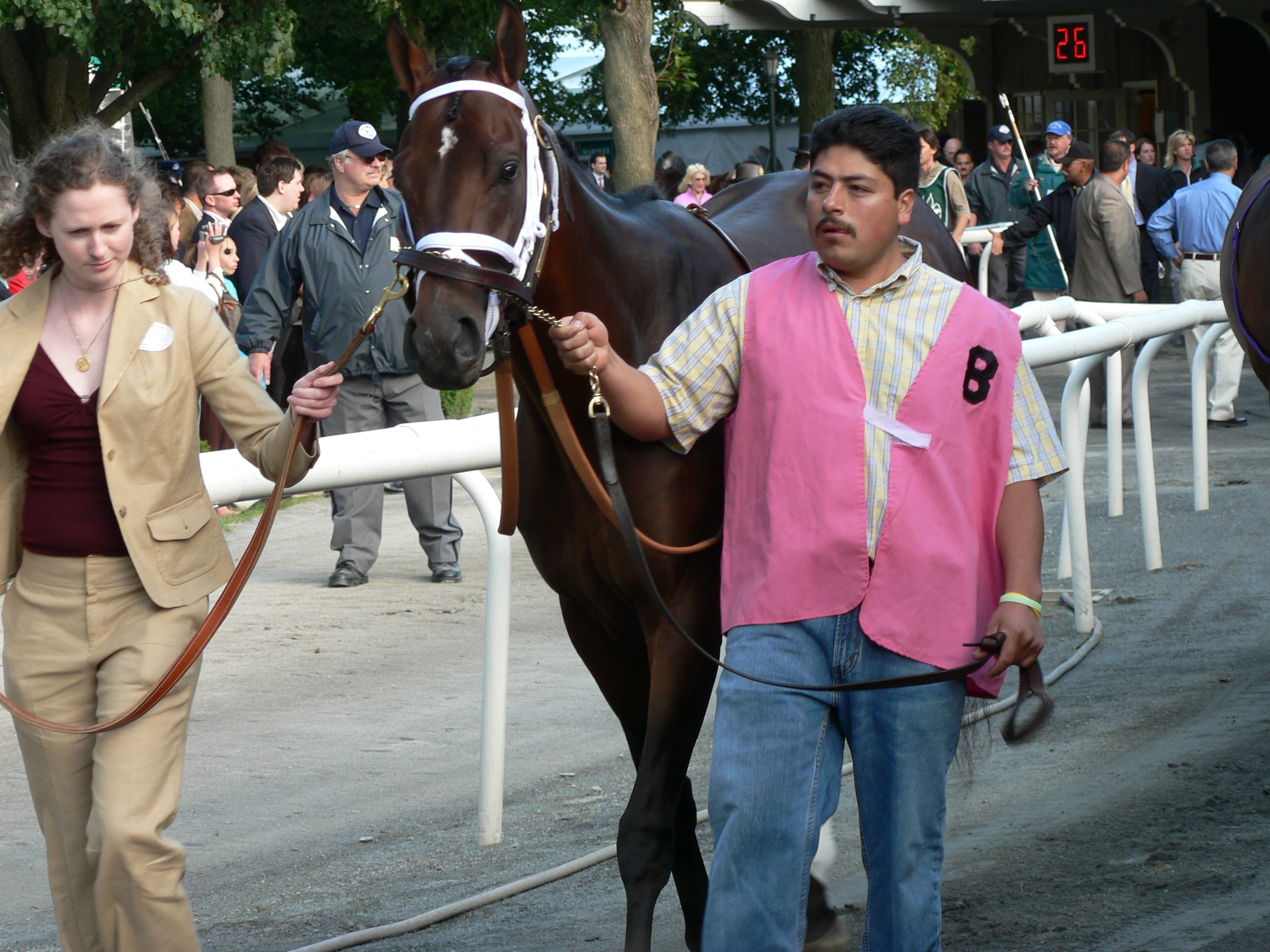
- Jazil before the 2006 Belmont Stakes
- Sire: Seeking The Gold
- Grandsire: Mr. Prospector
- Dam: Better Than Honour
- Damsire: Deputy Minister
- Sex: Stallion
- Foaled: 2003
- Country: United States
- Colour: Bay
- Breeder: Skara Glen Stables
- Owner: Shadwell Racing
- Trainer: Kiaran McLaughlin
- Record: 11: 2-5-0
- Earnings: $890,532

Major wins
- Triple Crown race wins: Belmont Stakes (2006)

Jazil (February 11, 2003 – October 11, 2014) was an American Thoroughbred racehorse.

In 2006, Jazil dead-heated for fourth place in the Kentucky Derby but then won the Belmont Stakes, the final leg of the Triple Crown.

== Connections ==
Jazil was owned by the Shadwell Stable. He was trained by Kiaran McLaughlin and ridden by Fernando Jara. He was bred in Kentucky by Skara Glen Stables.

== Breeding ==
The late thoroughbred's sire is Seeking The Gold, who also sired Dubai Millennium, while his dam is Better Than Honour by Deputy Minister. His grandsire was Mr. Prospector and in his breeding line are horses, including Raise a Native and Northern Dancer.

Siblings:
Teeming - 2001 bay filly by Storm Cat
Magnificent Honour - 2002 bay filly by A.P. Indy
Rags to Riches - 2004 chestnut filly by A.P. Indy
Casino Drive - 2005 chestnut colt by Mineshaft
Man of Iron - 2006 colt by Giant's Causeway

In September 2007, Jazil was retired to stud at Shadwell Farm's Lexington, Kentucky, division. His fee was set at $12,500 for a live foal in 2008 but was reduced to $4,000 by the time of his death. He sired Jazz on Ice (2008), owned by Thurman Thomas and J. Scott Whittle, and On The Roof Top (2008) owned by David Dukkaos and Thaig Poorgksi. Jazil died on October 11, 2014, from injuries secondary to an accident in his outdoor paddock.

== Racing career ==
Date	Finish	Race	Distance	Track	Condition
April 27, 2007	12th	Elkhorn Stakes	One and One-Half Miles (Turf)	Keeneland Race Course	Fast
February 8, 2007	2nd	Allowance Optional Claiming	One and One-Eighth Miles (Dirt)	Gulfstream Park	Fast
January 5, 2007	2nd	Allowance	One and One-Sixteenth Miles (Dirt)	Aqueduct Racetrack	Fast
June 10, 2006	1st	Belmont Stakes	One and a Half Miles (Dirt)	Belmont Park	Fast
May 6, 2006	4th (Dead Heat)	Kentucky Derby	One and a Quarter Miles (Dirt)	Churchill Downs	Fast
April 8, 2006	2nd	Wood Memorial Stakes	One and One-Eighth Miles (Dirt)	Aqueduct Racetrack	Sloppy
March 4, 2006	7th	Fountain of Youth Stakes	One and One-Eighth Miles (Dirt)	Gulfstream Park	Fast
February 2, 2006	2nd	Allowance	One and One-Eighth Miles (Dirt)	Gulfstream Park	Fast
December 7, 2005	1st	Maiden	One and One-Sixteenth Miles (Dirt)	Aqueduct Racetrack	Fast
November 12, 2005	2nd	Maiden	Seven Furlongs (Dirt)	Aqueduct Racetrack	Fast
October 23, 2005	6th	Maiden	Five and One-Half Furlongs (Dirt)	Aqueduct Racetrack	Fast
