= Hill 'n' Dale Farms =

North American race horse breeding farm

Coordinates: 38.114773°N 84.578354°W

- Company type: Private
- Industry: Equine
- Founded: 1960
- Founder: John Sikura Jr.
- Headquarters: King, Ontario, Canada
- Key people: John G. Sikura (co-owner and head of US operations); R. Glenn Sikura (co-owner and head of Canadian operations)
- Services: Horse breeding and racing
- Website: www.hillndale.ca

Hill 'n' Dale Farms is a thoroughbred race horse breeding farm with operations in Canada and the United States. The Canadian farm is located in King, Ontario.

== History ==
Hill 'n' Dale was founded in 1960 in Ontario, Canada, by Czechoslovak immigrant John Sikura Jr. Following John's death in an automobile accident in 1994, Hill 'n' Dale's American and Canadian operations were taken over by sons John G. Sikura and R. Glenn Sikura, respectively.

Notable broodmares that have resided at Hill 'n' Dale include Horse of the Year Azeri, 1999 Champion 3-Yr-Old Filly Silverbulletday, 1991 Canadian Triple Crown champion Dance Smartly, and Better Than Honour, the mother of Belmont Stakes winners Jazil and Rags to Riches. In 2007, Azeri gave birth to a chestnut colt by another Horse of the Year, A. P. Indy.

The old Hill 'n' Dale farm in Lexington, Kentucky (640 N Yarnalton Pike) is the burial place of Triple Crown winner Seattle Slew.

Hill 'n' Dale closed its Lexington operations in October 2020 (now as Don Alberto Farms) and the entire roster of horses was moved to Xalapa Farm in Paris, which John G. Sikura purchased in 2019. The operation is now referred to as "Hill 'n' Dale at Xalapa".

== See also ==
- Kinghaven Farms
