= Deputy Minister Stakes =

- Class: Restricted Stakes
- Location: Woodbine Racetrack; Toronto, Ontario, Canada
- Inaugurated: 1997
- Race type: Thoroughbred - Flat racing
- Website: www.woodbineentertainment.com

Race information
- Distance: Seven furlongs
- Surface: Polytrack
- Track: left-handed
- Qualification: Three-Year-Olds (Ontario Sire Stakes program)
- Weight: Allowances
- Purse: $96,000 + (2015)

The Deputy Minister Stakes is a Thoroughbred horse race run annually at Woodbine Racetrack in Toronto, Ontario, Canada. An Ontario Sire Stakes, it is a restricted race for three-year-old horses sired by a stallion standing in the province of Ontario during the year of their birth. Run in mid July, it is contested over a distance of seven furlongs on Polytrack (dirt from 1997–2006) and currently carries a purse of $96,000 + .

Inaugurated in 1997, the race was named in honour of Canadian Horse Racing Hall of Fame inductee, Deputy Minister, a Canadian-bred colt who earned Canadian Sovereign and American Eclipse awards during his racing career and who became a very influential stallion. He was the Leading sire in North America in 1997 and 1998, and the Leading broodmare sire in North America in 2007.

For 2006 only, the race was contested over 7 1/2 furlongs.

== Records ==
Speed record: (at current distance of seven furlongs)

- 1:21.80 - Matterofintegrity (1997)

Most wins by an owner:

- 2 - Margaret Squires (1999, 2004)

Most wins by a jockey:

- 3 - Emile Ramsammy (2000, 2001, 2002)
- 3 - Todd Kabel (2003, 2006, 2007)

Most wins by a trainer:

- 4 - Robert Tiller (2007, 2010, 2013, 2014)

== Winners of the Deputy Minister Stakes ==
Year	Winner	Jockey	Trainer	Owner	Time
2016	Ultraflame	Emma-Jayne Wilson	John A. Ross	J.R. Racing Stable	1:23.71
2015	Kingsport	Patrick Husbands	Sid C. Attard	Goldmart Farms/Royal Laser Racing	1:21.82
2014	Spadina Road	Eurico Rosa da Silva	Robert Tiller	Rolph A. Davis	1:22.94
2013	Jade Dragon	Tyler Pizarro	Robert Tiller	DiGiulio Jr./D'Onofrio/Peri	1:24.08
2012	Jenna's Wabbit	Eurico Rosa Da Silva	Ralph Biamonte	Lococo/Biamonte	1:23.00
2011	Queen Street Beach	Patrick Husbands	Mark E. Casse	Melnyk Racing Stables	1:22.88
2010	Race for Gold	Chantal Sutherland	Robert Tiller	The Very Dry Stable	1:23.98
2009	Costalivin	Jim McAleney	John A. Ross	Jam Jar Racing Stable	1:23.59
2008	Piper in the Glen	Chad Beckon	Zeljko Krcmar	Jesse Self	1:24.30
2007	Dancer's Bajan	Todd Kabel	Robert P. Tiller	3 Sons Racing Stable	1:23.94
2006	Bad Hat	Todd Kabel	Mike DePaulo	Bel Ange Bloodstock et al.	1:31.18
2005	Bold Grenadier	Na Somsanith	Scott H. Fairlie	A. Bhangoo & S. Fairlie	1:22.74
2004	Millfleet	Jill Scharfstein	Hugo Dittfach	Margaret Squires	1:23.65
2003	Battlements	Todd Kabel	Barbara J. Minshall	Minshall Farms	1:22.50
2002	Mulligan The Great	Emile Ramsammy	Cliff C. Hopmans	Charles E. Simmons	1:22.96
2001	Devil Valentine	Emile Ramsammy	Fenton Platts	Sandra & Gerry Gibbs	1:22.39
2000	Runaway Love	Emile Ramsammy	Abraham R. Katryan	Brandon Brako Stable	1:22.72
1999	Arctic Squire	Kenneth Skinner	Hugo Dittfach	Margaret Squires	1:23.20
1998	One Way Love	David Clark	Michael J. Wright, Jr.	B. Schickedanz & J. Hillier	1:23.00
1997	Matterofintegrity	Dino Luciani	T. Windsor	Foxcroft Stable et al.	1:21.80
