= Better Than Honour =

American-bred Thoroughbred racehorse

- Sire: Deputy Minister
- Grandsire: Vice Regent
- Dam: Blush With Pride
- Damsire: Blushing Groom
- Sex: Mare
- Foaled: February 27, 1996; Kentucky
- Died: October 14, 2020
- Country: United States
- Colour: Bay
- Breeder: Foxfield
- Owner: 1) Robert K. Waxman; 2) John G. Sikura; 3) Skara Glen Stables; 4) Coolmore Stud & Michael Tabor; 5) John G. Sikura & Southern Equine Stables; 6) Southern Equine Stables (11/08)
- Trainer: John C. Kimmel
- Record: 8: 2-4-2
- Earnings: $250,920

Major wins
- Demoiselle Stakes (1998)

Awards
- Kentucky Broodmare of the Year 2007

Better Than Honour (February 27, 1996 — October 14, 2020) was an American thoroughbred mare racehorse, best known for her career as a broodmare. She was out of the Kentucky Oaks winner, Blush With Pride, by the sire, Deputy Minister. Owned by Robert Waxman, she was trained by John Kimmel.

Lightly raced at two, Better Than Honour, the favorite, won the Grade II Demoiselle Stakes after Tutorial veered in down the stretch and was disqualified and placed fifth. At three, Better Than Honour placed in the Acorn Stakes and Comely Stakes, with a show in the Mother Goose Stakes.

When her racing career was over, Better Than Honour was purchased by John G. Sikura of Hill 'n' Dale Farms in Kentucky. He sold her to Skara Glen Stables in 2001 then in 2005, while in foal to Mineshaft, she was sold at the 2004 Keeneland November sale for $2 Million to Coolmore Stud and Michael Tabor. She is now the property of John G. Sikura and Southern Equine Stables and resides at Hill 'n' Dale in Kentucky.

Better Than Honour was sold again for a world-record price for a broodmare of $14 million at the 2008 November Fasig-Tipton sale in Kentucky. Southern Equine Stables paid that amount in order to acquire one hundred percent ownership.

Better Than Honour foaled several graded stakes winners, including:

- Jazil (b. 2003) - winner of the 2006 Belmont Stakes
- Rags To Riches (b. 2004) - winner of the 2007 Kentucky Oaks and Belmont Stakes
- Casino Drive (b. 2005) - winner of the 2008 Peter Pan Stakes
- Man of Iron (b. 2006) - winner of the 2009 Breeders' Cup Marathon

She was also the great grand dam of the 2023 Belmont Stakes and Travers Stakes Winner Arcangelo through her 2001 foal Teeming via that mare's 2012 foal Modeling.

Better Than Honour was euthanized October 17, 2020 at the age of 24 due to foundering.
