= 2009 Dubai World Cup =

14th Dubai World Cup
- Dubai World Cup
- Location: Nad Al Sheba
- Date: 28 March 2009
- Winning horse: Well Armed (USA)
- Jockey: Aaron Gryder
- Trainer: Eoin Harty (USA)
- Owner: WinStar Farm

The 2009 Dubai World Cup was a horse race held at Nad Al Sheba Racecourse on Saturday 28 March 2009. It was the 14th running of the Dubai World Cup. It was the last edition of the Dubai World Cup to be run on dirt at Nad Al Sheba before being switched to the synthetic Tapeta surface at Meydan Racecourse.

The winner was WinStar Farm's Well Armed, a six-year-old bay gelding trained in the United States by Eoin Harty and ridden by Aaron Gryder. Well Armed's victory was the first in the race for his jockey, trainer and owner.

Well Armed had been trained in England by Clive Brittain in the early part of his career before being transferred to the Harty's American stable in 2007. Racing in California, he showed his best form on synthetic tracks winning the San Antonio Handicap, the San Diego Handicap and the Goodwood Stakes. In the 2008 Dubai World Cup he finished third behind Curlin and Asiatic Boy. In the 2009 Dubai World Cup he started at odds of 10/1 and won by a record margin of fourteen lengths from the French-trained Gloria de Campeao, with the South African-bred, Saudi Arabian-trained runner Paris Perfect four and a half lengths away in third. The 2/1 favourite Asiatic Boy finished twelfth of the fourteen runners.

== Race details ==
- Sponsor: Emirates
- Purse: £4,166,667; First prize: £2,500,000
- Surface: Dirt
- Going: Fast
- Distance: 10 furlongs
- Number of runners: 14
- Winner's time: 2:01.01

== Full result ==
Pos.	Marg.	Horse (bred)	Age	Jockey	Trainer (Country)	Odds
1		Well Armed (USA)	6	Aaron Gryder	Eoin Harty (USA)	10/1
2	14	Gloria de Campeao (BRZ)	6	Jorge Leme	Pascal Bary (FR)	25/1
3	4½	Paris Perfect (SAF)	5	Bernard Fayd'Herbe	Neil Bruss (KSA)	66/1
4	½	Muller (ARG)	6	Weichong Marwing	Neil Bruss (KSA)	50/1
5	3½	My Indy (ARG)	5	Frankie Dettori	Saeed bin Suroor (GB/UAE)	10/1
6	1¾	Albertus Maximus (USA)	5	Alan Garcia	Kiaran McLaughlin (USA)	16/1
7	½	Snaafy (USA)	5	Richard Hills	M Al Muhairi (UAE)	12/1
8	2¼	Casino Drive (USA)	4	Katsumi Ando	Kazuo Fujisawa (JPN)	4/1
9	½	Happy Boy (BRZ)	6	Ahmed Ajtebi	M bin Shafya (UAE)	25/1
10	1¼	Muhannak (IRE)	5	Ryan Moore	Ralph Beckett (GB)	50/1
11	1¼	Arson Squad (USA)	6	Edgar Prado	Richard Dutrow (USA)	33/1
12	3¼	Asiatic Boy (ARG)	6	Johnny Murtagh	Mike de Kock (SAF)	2/1 fav
13	¾	Joe Louis (ARG)	6	Wigberto Ramos	Jerry Barton (KSA)	66/1
14	7½	Anak Nakal (USA)	4	Joe Bravo	Nick Zito (USA)	100/1

- Abbreviations: nse = nose; nk = neck; shd = head; hd = head; nk = neck

== Winner's details ==
Further details of the winner, Well Armed

- Sex: Gelding
- Foaled: 4 April 2003
- Country: United States
- Sire: Tiznow; Dam: Well Dressed (Notebook)
- Owner: WinStar Farm
- Breeder: WinStar Farm
