= Discreetly Mine =

American-bred Thoroughbred racehorse

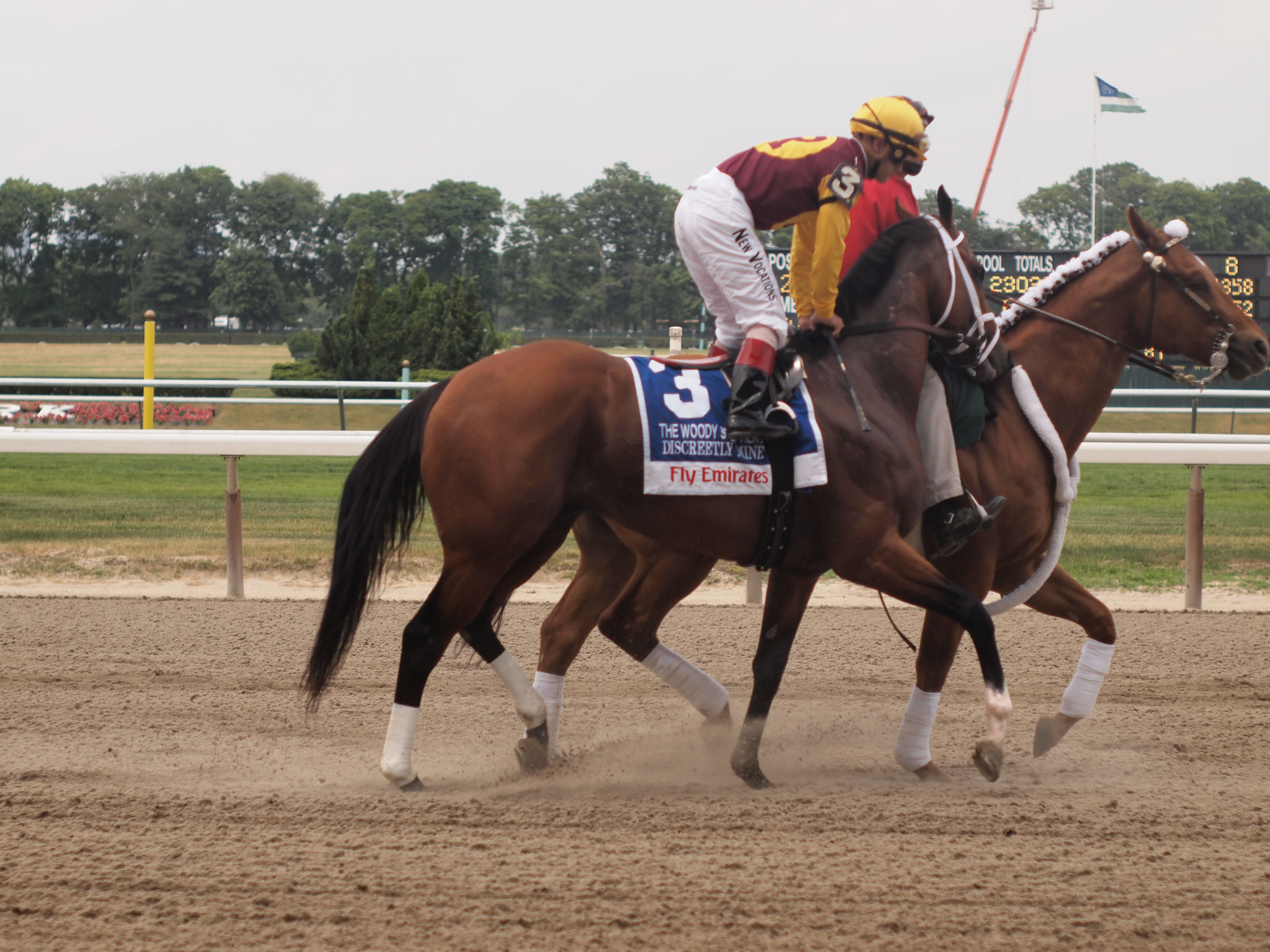
- Discreetly Mine at Belmont Park on Belmont Stakes day, June 5, 2010
- Sire: Mineshaft
- Grandsire: A.P. Indy
- Dam: Pretty Discreet
- Damsire: Private Account
- Sex: Stallion
- Foaled: 2007
- Country: United States
- Color: Bay
- Breeder: E. Paul Robsham Stables, LLC
- Owner: E. Paul Robsham Stables, LLC
- Trainer: 1) Stanley M. Hough; 2) Todd A. Pletcher
- Record: 12: 5-4-0
- Earnings: US$769,350

Major wins
- Risen Star Stakes (2010); Jersey Shore Stakes (2010); Amsterdam Stakes (2010); King's Bishop Stakes (2010)

Discreetly Mine is a retired American thoroughbred race horse. Foaled on March 30, 2007, he won the Risen Star Stakes in February 2010, making him a contender for the 2010 Kentucky Derby in which he finished thirteenth.

== Background ==
Bred in Kentucky by E. Paul Robsham, Discreetly Mine was sired by Mineshaft (by A.P. Indy), who was voted the 2003 American Horse of the Year. He is out of Pretty Discreet, a Grade I winner of the Alabama Stakes, herself a daughter of Private Account. This makes Discreetly Mine a half brother to Co-World Champion 3-Year-Old (2006) Discreet Cat (by Forestry).

Discreetly Mine was raced by E. Paul Robsham Stables, LLC and trained by Todd Pletcher.

== Two-year-old Campaign ==
Discreetly Mine broke his maiden in his third career start at Saratoga Race Course in Saratoga Springs, New York. After this win, he was placed in the Grade II Belmont Futurity Stakes, where he finished second to D' Funnybone. His final two-year-old start was another second in the Grade 1 Champagne Stakes in which he was defeated by Homeboykris.

== Three-year-old Campaign ==
Discreetly Mine won the Risen Star Stakes on February 20, 2010. He then ran in the March 27 Louisiana Derby, finishing fourth to winner Mission Impazible.

In other 2010 races Discreetly Mine took the Jersey Shore Stakes and the Amsterdam Stakes, placed in the Jim Dandy Stakes, and won the 2010 King's Bishop Stakes.

Later that year, Discreetly Mine injured his stifle and was retired.

== Stallion career ==
In 2016, Discreetly Mine was sold to Haras Lacala to stand at stud in Uruguay.
