= Javier Castellano =

Venezuelan jockey

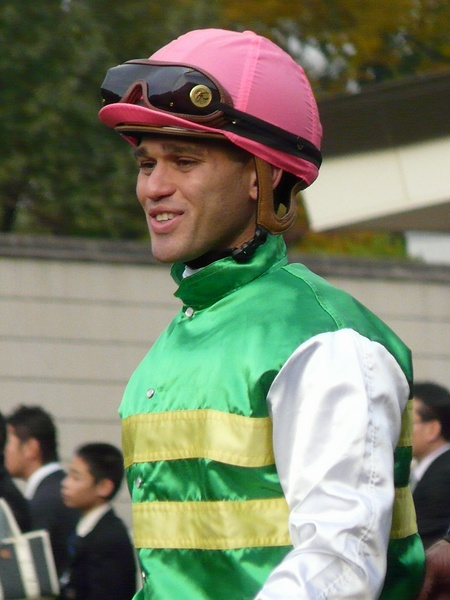
- Castellano in 2010

Personal information
- Born: October 23, 1977 (age 48) Maracaibo, Zulia, Venezuela
- Occupation: Jockey

Horse racing career
- Sport: Horse racing
- Career wins: 6,003 ongoing

Major racing wins
- Graded Stakes wins: Metropolitan Handicap (2005, 2015, 2020); Donn Handicap (2015); Miami Mile Handicap (1999, 2009); Smile Sprint Handicap (2000); Beldame Stakes (2001, 2004); Clark Handicap (2003); Woodward Stakes (2004, 2015, 2016); Wood Memorial Stakes (2005); Flash Stakes (2005); Hill Prince Stakes (2005, 2006); Jim Dandy Stakes (2006); Jockey Club Gold Cup (2006, 2023); Withers Stakes (2006, 2013); Long Branch Stakes (2007); Kelso Breeders' Cup Handicap (2007, 2008); Shirley Jones Handicap (2008); Highlander Stakes (2008); Man o' War Stakes (2008); Garden City Handicap (2008); Commonwealth Turf Stakes (2009); Remsen Stakes (2013); Gazelle Handicap (2001, 2006); Secretariat Stakes (2003); Vosburgh Stakes (2003); Lane's End Breeders' Futurity (2003); Bertram F. Bongard Stakes (2004); Beaugay Handicap (2004); Discovery Handicap (2004); Sport Page Breeders' Cup Handicap (2004); Jamaica Handicap (2005); Coolmore Lexington Stakes (2005); Forward Gal Stakes (2005); Ben Ali Stakes (2006); Gallant Bloom Handicap (2006); Vagrancy Handicap (2007); Sabin Stakes (2007, 2008); Endeavour Stakes (2012); Bowling Green Handicap (2013); Travers (2006, 2010, 2011, 2014, 2015, 2018, 2023); American Classics / Breeders' Cup: Kentucky Derby (2023); Preakness Stakes (2006, 2017); Belmont Stakes (2023); Kentucky Oaks (2016); Breeders' Cup Classic (2004); Breeders' Cup Dirt Mile (2015, 2018); Breeders' Cup Distaff (2015); Breeders' Cup Juvenile Fillies (2013, 2019); Breeders' Cup Filly & Mare Turf (2012, 2014); Breeders' Cup Juvenile Fillies Turf (2016); Breeders' Cup Turf Sprint (2019); International races: Dubai Golden Shaheen (2005); Connaught Cup Stakes (2006); Woodbine Oaks (2008); Canadian International Stakes (2008)

Racing awards
- Eclipse Award for Outstanding Jockey (2013, 2014, 2015, 2016)

Honors
- National Museum of Racing and Hall of Fame (2017)

Significant horses
- Ghostzapper, Bernardini, Red Rocks, Stay Thirsty, Bellamy Road, Honor Code, Shaman Ghost, Cloud Computing, Mage

Javier Castellano (born October 23, 1977) is a Venezuelan jockey and Hall of Fame member in American thoroughbred horse racing.

Castellano won the Eclipse Award for Outstanding Jockey four times in a row from 2013 to 2016. In 2023 he won two legs of the American Triple Crown–the Kentucky Derby and the Belmont Stakes–aboard different horses.

== Career ==
Castellano began his riding career in 1996 at Santa Rita and La Rinconada racecourses in Venezuela. In June 1997 he moved to the United States where he rode at race tracks in southern Florida until 2001, when he moved north to race on the New York State racing circuit.

He had his first major wins in 2004, on Frank Stronach's colt Ghostzapper and won several major races including the 2004 Breeders' Cup Classic, earning 2004 Eclipse Award for Horse of the Year and other honors. In 2006, Castellano rode Bernardini for Mohammed bin Rashid Al Maktoum's Darley Racing, winning the Preakness Stakes, the Travers Stakes, and the Jockey Club Gold Cup.

Castellano received the Eclipse Award for Outstanding Jockey in 2013, 2014, 2015, and 2016, each year having the highest purse winnings of any jockey in North America. In 2013, he finished the year with purse earnings of over $26.2 million, surpassing the single-season record previously held by Ramon Dominguez in 2012. He passed 4,000 North American wins in February 2015, and by the end of the year had broken his own single-season winnings and earnings record.

In 2023 Castellano won two legs of the Triple Crown on two separate horses, winning aboard Mage in the Kentucky Derby and Arcangelo in the Belmont Stakes. It was Castellano's first career victory in each race.

Castellano was inducted into the National Museum of Racing and Hall of Fame in 2017.

== Personal life ==
Racing runs in Castellano's family. His father, who died in 2000, his uncle, and a brother all have been jockeys. He considers his father to be the biggest influence on his career.

He and his wife, Abby have three children. His father-in-law is Terry Meyocks, national director of the Jockeys' Guild. His younger brother Abel Castellano, Jr. (born 1983) is also a jockey and rode his first winner on September 22, 1999, at Santa Rita Race Course in Venezuela. In 2000 he began riding in the United States at Gulfstream Park.

== Year-end charts ==
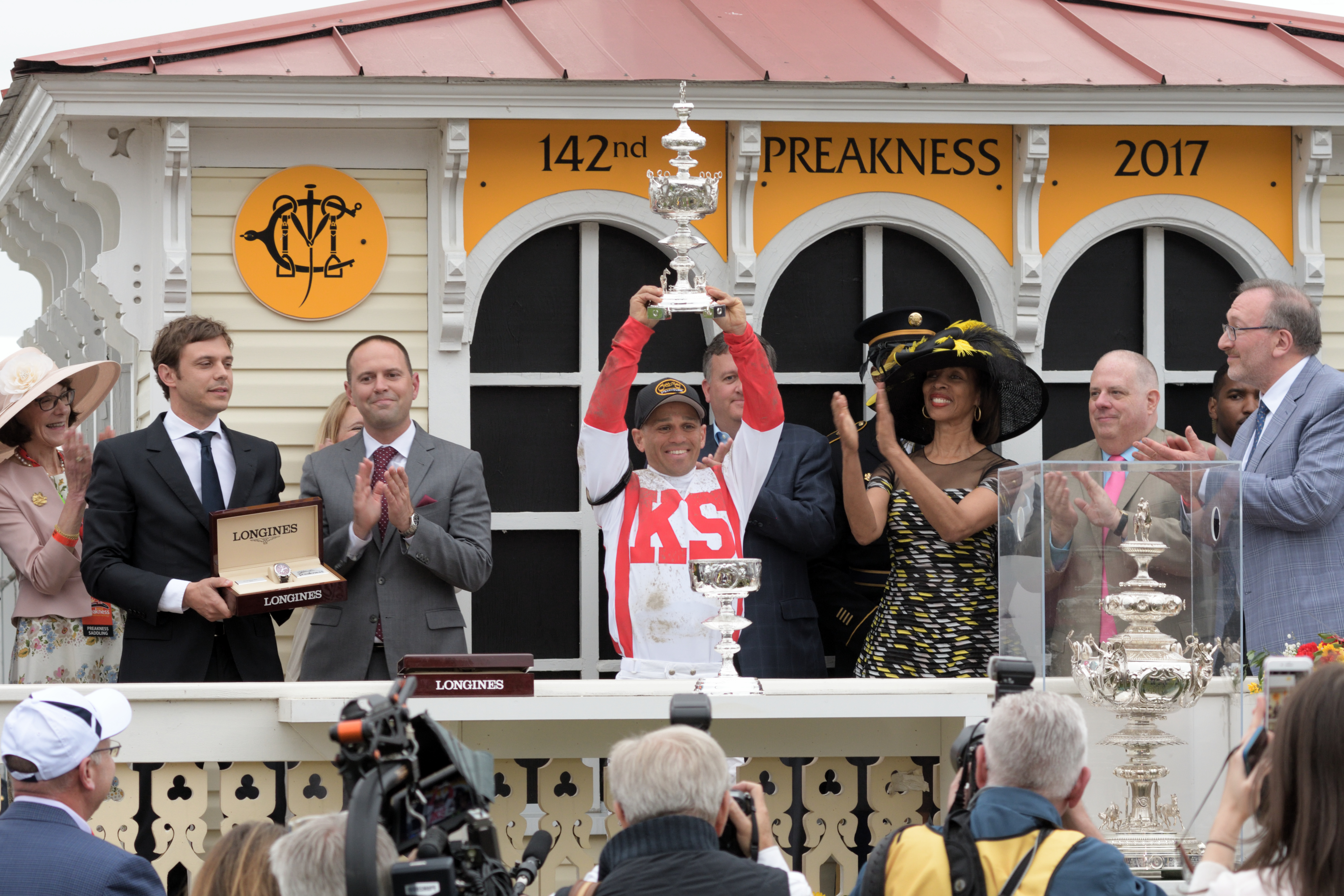
Castellano with the Woodlawn Vase in 2017

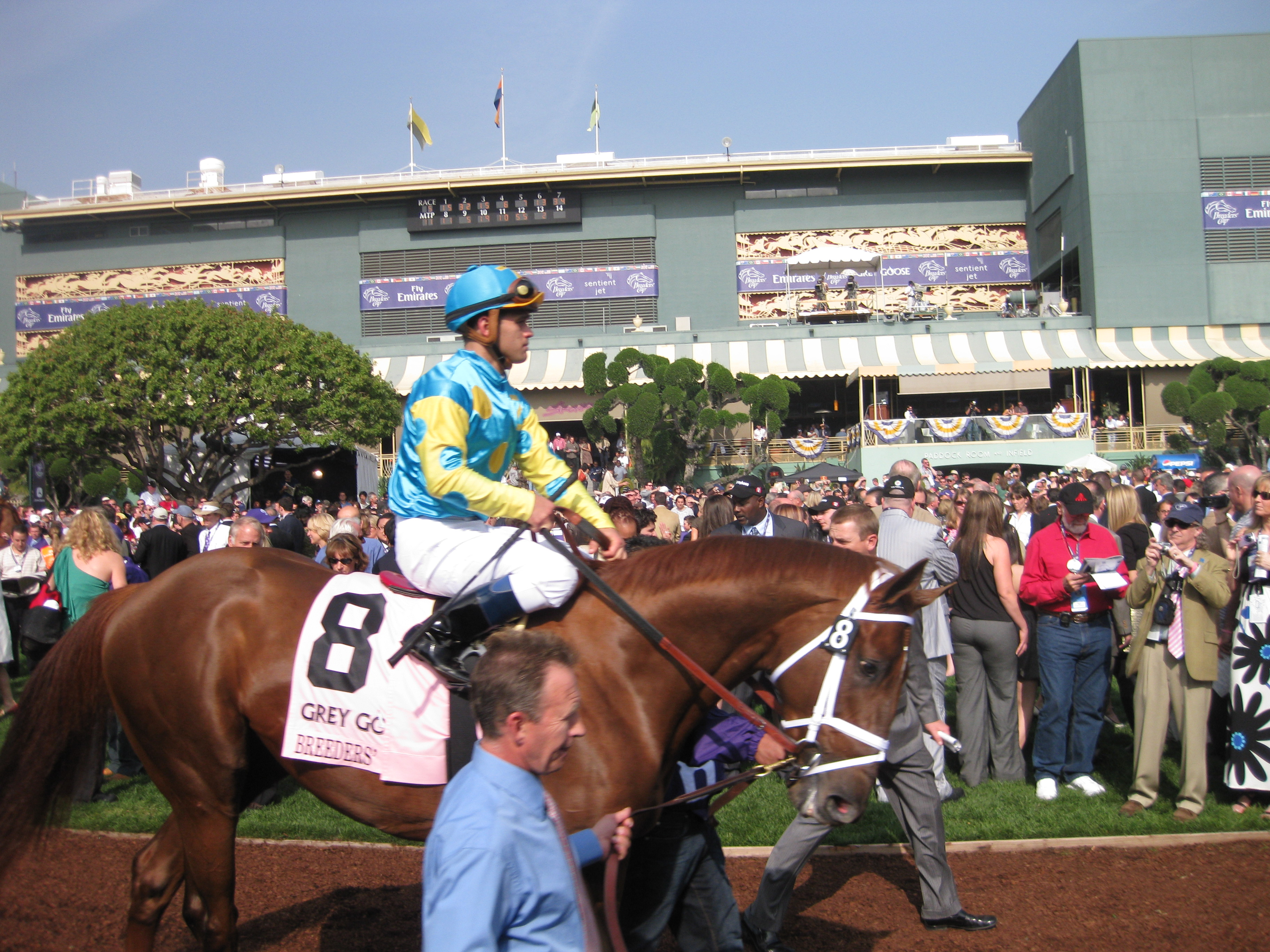
Castellano in 2009 on Eskendereya

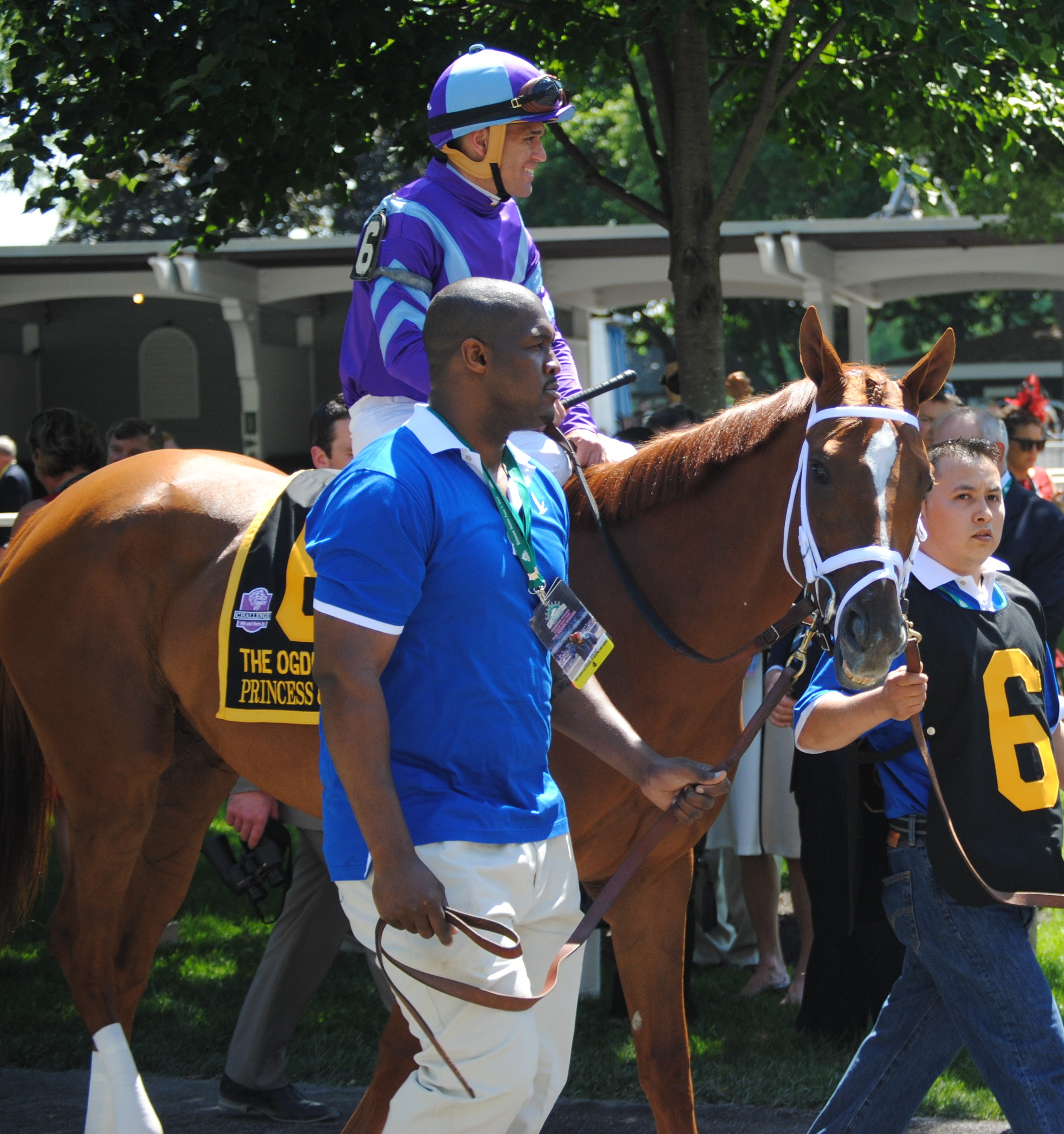
Castellano on Princess of Sylmar, 2014

Chart (2000–present)	Rank by earnings
National Earnings List for Jockeys 2000	31
National Earnings List for Jockeys 2001	28
National Earnings List for Jockeys 2002	15
National Earnings List for Jockeys 2003	15
National Earnings List for Jockeys 2004	6
National Earnings List for Jockeys 2005	6
National Earnings List for Jockeys 2006	11
National Earnings List for Jockeys 2007	9
National Earnings List for Jockeys 2008	10
National Earnings List for Jockeys 2009	16
National Earnings List for Jockeys 2010	6
National Earnings List for Jockeys 2011	3
National Earnings List for Jockeys 2012	2
National Earnings List for Jockeys 2013	1
National Earnings List for Jockeys 2014	1
National Earnings List for Jockeys 2015	1
National Earnings List for Jockeys 2016	1
National Earnings List for Jockeys 2017	2
National Earnings List for Jockeys 2018	3
National Earnings List for Jockeys 2019	3
National Earnings List for Jockeys 2020	9
