= Live foal guarantee =

Live foal guarantee is a common provision in horse breeding contracts. It is a form of a warranty offered to the mare owner by the stallion owner. Basically, it says that if the mare fails to produce a live foal from the breeding, the stallion owner will breed the same mare again without charging another stud fee. Therefore, the stud fee is typically paid only if a live foal is produced and would not be if aborted, stillborn, or even if the mare dies while in foal.

Each specific breeding contract can have different details regarding a live foal guarantee.

== Live foal ==
Commonly defined as one that stands and nurses from the mare unassisted.

If the foal miscarries, is stillborn, or is unable to stand and nurse, it is not considered a live foal, and the mare owner may be entitled to an additional covering.

== Length of survival ==
If the foal stands after birth and nurses from the mare, it is considered a live foal, even if it dies soon after. Some contracts are more generous, specifying that the foal must survive for at least 12 or 24 hours after first nursing. If the foal survives this long and then dies, it was still a live foal, and the mare owner is not entitled to a re-breeding. But many stallion owners will offer a reduced stud fee in such cases, for goodwill reasons. Some breeding contracts specify that a live foal is a "single live foal", because in some breeds, twins are considered to have no or little value. Also, it is fairly common for only one of a pair of twin foals to survive; this provision clarifies that the loss of one twin does not trigger the re-breeding guarantee.

== Re-breeding ==
=== Timing ===
Normally, the re-breeding must take place within the same breeding season, though some breeding contracts extend this to allow it during the breeding season for the following year.

=== Same mare ===
Normally, the re-breeding must be to the same mare. Sometimes the contract allows substitution of a different mare, either under specific circumstances (death, disability, or infertility of the original mare) or just upon approval of the stallion owner.

=== Frequency ===
Sometimes the breeding contract will specify how many times the live foal guarantee may be used. If it does not, a 'reasonable number' is assumed. Typically, after three unsuccessful tries, the stallion owner will either require substitution of another mare or will return the stud fee. Or the contract may allow the stallion owner to simply keep the stud fee after the agreed number of tries.

== Vet report ==
Often, before re-breeding, the stallion owner will require a veterinary report, giving the cause for the problem. This is to ensure that the mare is healthy, able to carry a foal, and to check for genetic incompatibilities. There are certain genetic crosses that are lethal to the foal. There is no point to re-breeding in such cases, so the stallion owner will allow substitution of another mare or will return the stud fee.

== Other fees ==
The guarantee applies only to the stud fee, which will not be charged for the re-breeding. But other incidental expenses, such as mare care and board or shipping costs for AI semen, will have to be paid again by the mare owner.

== See also ==
- Horse breeding
