= Man of Iron (horse) =

American-bred Thoroughbred racehorse

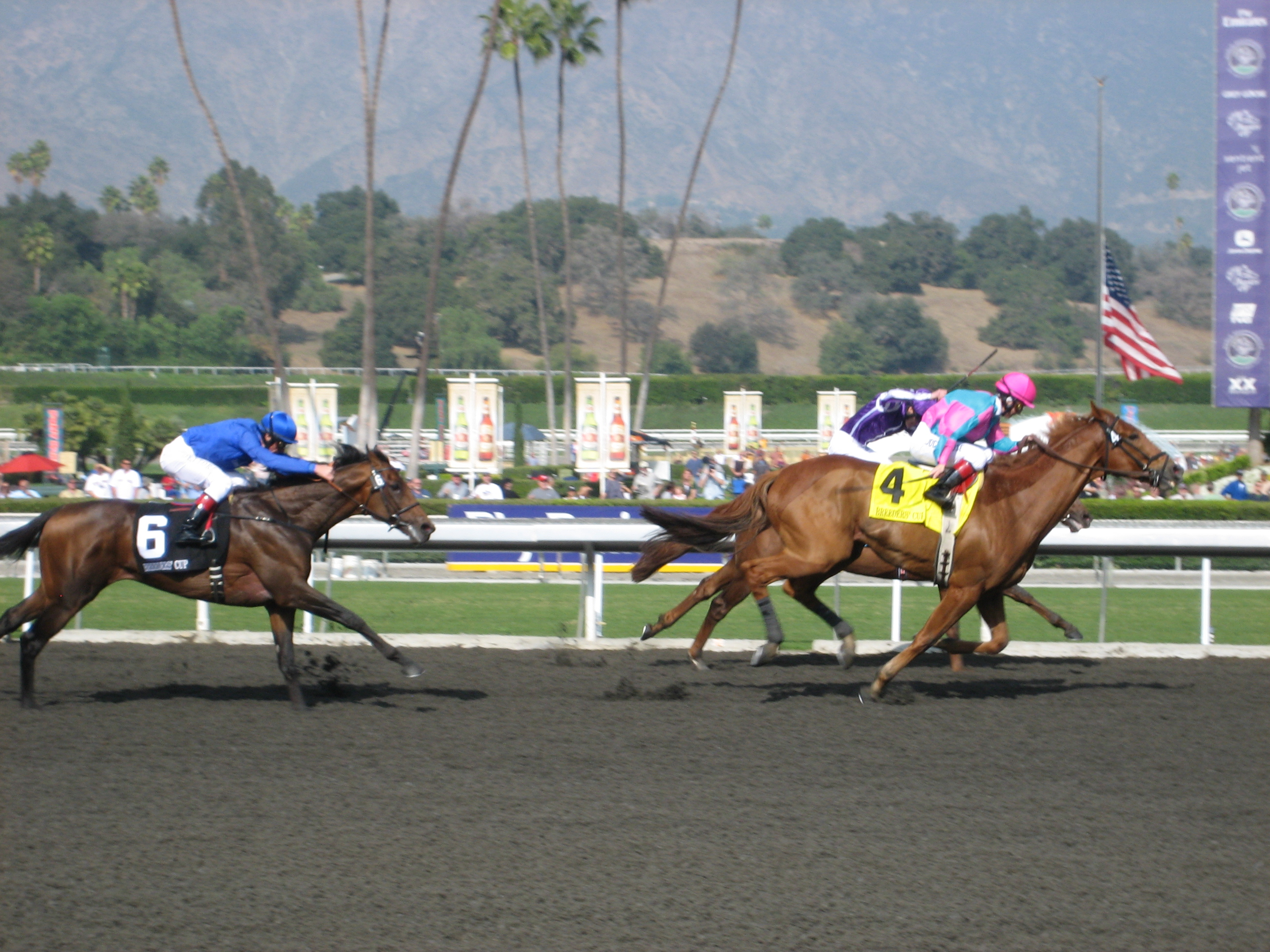
- Man of Iron, almost hidden on the rail, in the Breeders' Cup Marathon
- Sire: Giant's Causeway
- Grandsire: Storm Cat
- Dam: Better Than Honour
- Damsire: Deputy Minister
- Sex: Colt
- Foaled: 2006
- Country: United States
- Colour: bay
- Breeder: Skara Glen Stables
- Owner: Derrick Smith/Susan Magnier/Michael Tabor
- Trainer: Aidan O'Brien
- Record: 10:4-0-0

Major wins
- Breeders' Cup Marathon (2009)
- Last updated on October 16, 2009

Man of Iron, foaled in Kentucky in 2006, is an American Thoroughbred racehorse. Sired by Giant's Causeway and out of the mare Better Than Honour, he was bred by Skara Glen Stables. He was sold as a yearling to Racing Partners Smith/Magnier/Tabor, who turned over his training to Aidan O'Brien.

On November 6, 2009, he won the most important race of his career: the Breeders' Cup Marathon. In the 14-furlong race, he fought off Cloudy's Knight to win by a nose.

== Siblings ==
- Teeming – 2001 bay filly by Storm Cat
- Magnificent Honour – 2002 bay filly by A.P. Indy
- Jazil – 2003 bay colt by Seeking the Gold
- Rags to Riches – 2004 chestnut filly by A.P. Indy
- Casino Drive – 2005 chestnut colt by A.P. Indy
