= National Treasure (horse) =

Thoroughbred race horse

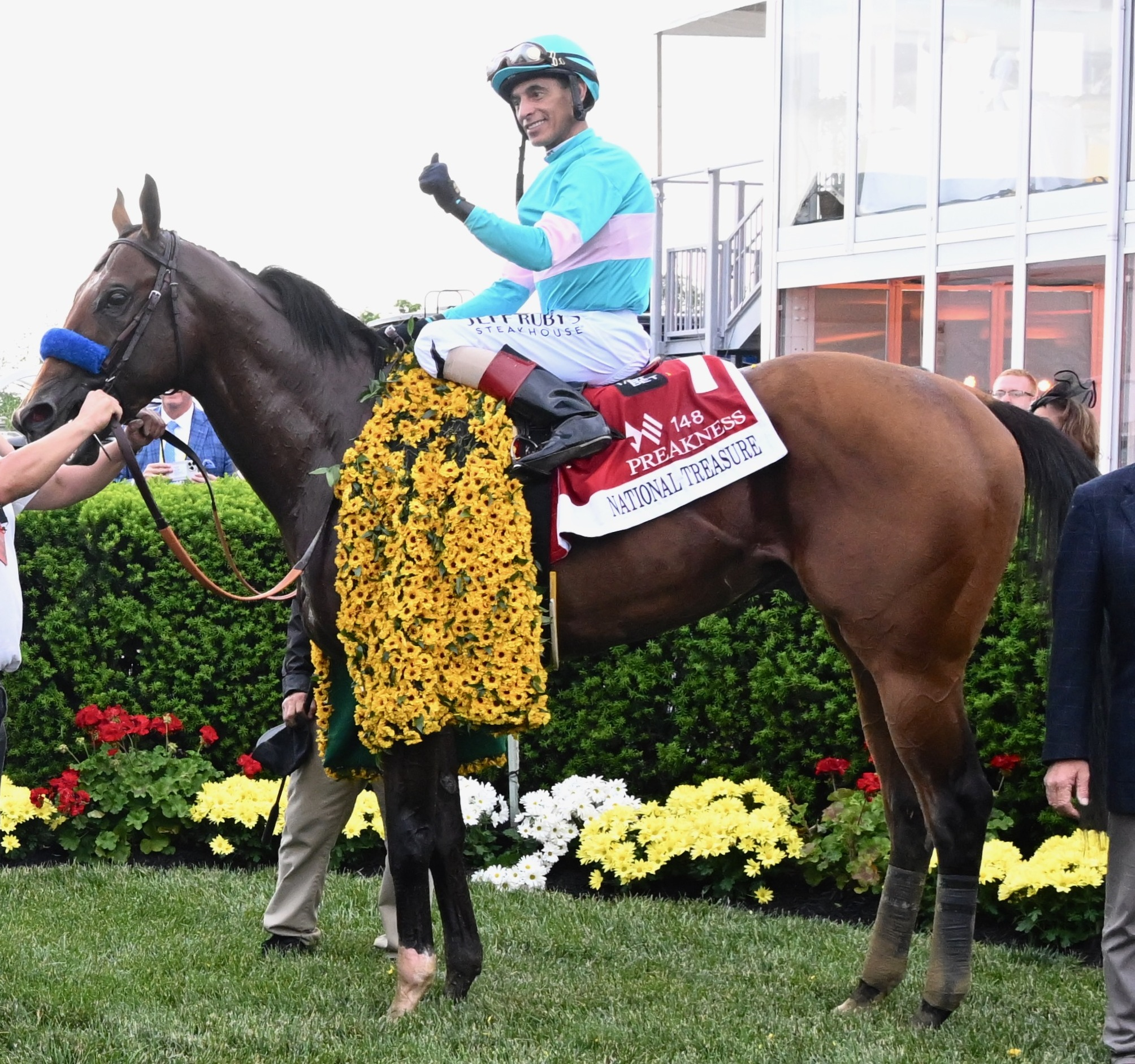
- National Treasure at Preakness Stakes
- Sire: Quality Road
- Grandsire: Elusive Quality
- Dam: Treasure
- Damsire: Medaglia d'Oro
- Sex: Colt
- Foaled: March 17, 2020 (age 6); Kentucky, U.S.
- Country: United States
- Color: Bay
- Breeder: Peter E. Blum
- Owner: SF Racing, Starlight Racing, Madaket Stables, Robert E. Masterson, Stonestreet Stables, Jay A. Schoenfarber, Waves Edge Capital & Catherine Donovan
- Trainer: Bob Baffert (Sept. 2022–Mar. 2023); Tim Yakteen (Mar. 2023-Apr. 2023); Bob Baffert (Apr. 2023–)
- Record: 15: 4 - 3 - 2
- Earnings: US$5,578,000

Major wins
- Pegasus World Cup Invitational Stakes (2024); Metropolitan Handicap (2024); American Triple Crown wins: Preakness Stakes (2023)
- Last updated on 9 October 2024

National Treasure (born March 17, 2020) is an American thoroughbred racehorse who won the 2023 Preakness Stakes, the second leg of the American Triple Crown. In 2024 National Treasure won the Grade I Pegasus World Cup Invitational Stakes at Gulfstream Park.

== Background ==
National Treasure is a bay colt bred in Kentucky by Peter E. Blum. His sire Quality Road won the 2009 Florida Derby but due to minor injuries did not compete in the U.S. Triple Crown events. National Treasure was consigned to the 2021 Fasig-Tipton New York Saratoga Select Yearling Sale and was bought by Tom Ryan's SF Racing ownership group for $500,000. In 2023, Quality Road stood at Lane's End Farm for $200,000.

His dam, Treasure, is a daughter of Medaglia d'Oro who has had four foals to race.

National Treasure is Quality Road's first North American classic-winning colt, also the first black-type winner for his dam. His second dam, Proposal, a graded stakes-placed daughter of Mt. Livermore, is a sister to the Grade III Jaipur Handicap victor Multiple Choice, and half sister to Lady Godiva, the dam of Grade I winner Leofric, and to Lemon Lady, the granddam of the 2021 Grade III Iroquois Stakes winner, Major General.

National Treasure is owned by the ownership group of SF Racing, Starlight Racing, Madaket Stables, Robert Masterson, Stonestreet Stables, Jay Schoenfarber, Waves Edge Capital, and Catherine Donovan.

He is trained by Hall of Famer Bob Baffert. Due to Bob Baffert's suspension in 2023 to enter horses into the Kentucky Derby, the ownership group moved the horse in March 2023 to trainer Tim Yakteen. The horse ran once under his guidance in the Santa Anita Derby.

== Retirement ==
National Treasure suffered a hoof injury and was retired after the September 28 California Crown Stakes to stand at stud at Spendthrift Farm. It was announced that his introductory stud fee for 2025 was $40,000 standing and nursing.

== Statistics ==
| Date | Distance | Race | Grade | Track | Odds | Field | Finish | Winning time | Winning (losing) margin | Jockey | Ref |
|---|---|---|---|---|---|---|---|---|---|---|---|
2022 – Two-year-old season
| Sep 3, 2022 | 6 1/2 furlongs | Maiden Special Weight | | Santa Anita | 3.40 | 10 | 1 | 1:16.62 | 1 1/2 lengths | John R. Velazquez | |
| Oct 8, 2022 | 1 1/16 miles | American Pharoah Stakes | I | Santa Anita | 9.80 | 8 | 2 | 1:43.05 | (5 1/4 lengths) | Ramon Vasquez | |
| Nov 4, 2022 | 1 1/16 miles | Breeders' Cup Juvenile | I | Keeneland | 8.00 | 10 | 3 | 1:43.06 | (3 3/4 lengths) | John R. Velazquez | |
2023 – Three-year-old season
| Jan 8, 2023 | 1 mile | Sham Stakes | III | Santa Anita | 0.60* | 5 | 3 | 1:49.37 | (1 length) | John R. Velazquez | |
| Apr 8, 2023 | 1 1/8 miles | Santa Anita Derby | I | Santa Anita | 2.50 | 8 | 4 | 1:48.69 | (2 3/4 lengths) | John R. Velazquez | |
| May 20, 2023 | 1 3/16 miles | Preakness Stakes | I | Pimlico | 2.90 | 7 | 1 | 1:55.12 | head | John R. Velazquez | |
| Jun 10, 2023 | 1 1/2 miles | Belmont Stakes | I | Belmont Park | 5.70 | 9 | 6 | 2:29.23 | (7 1/4 lengths) | John R. Velazquez | |
| Aug 26, 2023 | 1 1/4 miles | Travers Stakes | I | Saratoga | 6.60 | 7 | 5 | 2:02.23 | (9 3/4 lengths) | John R. Velazquez | |
| Sep 30, 2023 | 1 1/8 miles | Awesome Again Stakes | I | Santa Anita | 3.00 | 9 | 4 | 1:47.62 | (4 3/4 lengths) | Juan Hernandez | |
| Nov 4, 2023 | 1 mile | Breeders' Cup Dirt Mile | I | Santa Anita | 4.80 | 7 | 2 | 1:35.97 | (nose) | Flavien Prat | |
2024 – Four-year-old season
| Jan 27, 2024 | 1 1/8 miles | Pegasus World Cup | I | Gulfstream Park | 2.60* | 12 | 1 | 1:50.51 | neck | Flavien Prat | |
| Feb 24, 2024 | 1800 metres | Saudi Cup | I | King Abdulaziz Racetrack | N/A (Note: Wagering is not allowed in Saudi Arabia. In British wagering, National Treasure started at 8/1 odds) | 14 | 4 | 1:49.50 | (1 3/4 lengths) | Flavien Prat | |
| Jun 8, 2024 | 1 mile | Metropolitan Handicap | I | Saratoga | 1.35* | 6 | 1 | 1:35.12 | 6 1/4 lengths | Flavien Prat | |
| Aug 3, 2024 | 1 1/8 miles | Whitney Stakes | I | Saratoga | 0.95* | 10 | 6 | 1:48.54 | (10 lengths) | Flavien Prat | |
| Sep 28, 2024 | 1 1/8 miles | California Crown Stakes | I | Santa Anita | 1.60 | 6 | 2 | 1:48.68 | (head) | Flavien Prat | |

Notes:
An (*) asterisk after the odds means National Treasure was the post-time favorite.

== Pedigree ==
Pedigree of National Treasure (USA), bay colt, March 17, 2020
| Sire Quality Road (2006) | Elusive Quality (1993) | Gone West (1984) | Mr. Prospector (1970) |
| Sire Quality Road (2006) | Elusive Quality (1993) | Gone West (1984) | Secrettame (1978) |
| Sire Quality Road (2006) | Elusive Quality (1993) | Touch of Greatness (1986) | Hero's Honor (1970) |
| Sire Quality Road (2006) | Elusive Quality (1993) | Touch of Greatness (1986) | Ivory Wand (1973) |
| Sire Quality Road (2006) | Kobla (1995) | Strawberry Road (AUS) (1979) | Whiskey Road (1972) |
| Sire Quality Road (2006) | Kobla (1995) | Strawberry Road (AUS) (1979) | Giftisa (NZ) (1974) |
| Sire Quality Road (2006) | Kobla (1995) | Winglet (1988) | Alydar (1975) |
| Sire Quality Road (2006) | Kobla (1995) | Winglet (1988) | Highest Trump (1972) |
| Dam Treasure (2012) | Medaglia d'Oro (1999) | El Prado (IRE) (1989) | Sadler's Wells (1981) |
| Dam Treasure (2012) | Medaglia d'Oro (1999) | El Prado (IRE) (1989) | Lady Capulet (1974) |
| Dam Treasure (2012) | Medaglia d'Oro (1999) | Cappucino Bay (1989) | Bailjumper (1974) |
| Dam Treasure (2012) | Medaglia d'Oro (1999) | Cappucino Bay (1989) | Dubbed In (1973) |
| Dam Treasure (2012) | Proposal (1997) | Mt. Livermore (1981) | Blushing Groom (FR) (1974) |
| Dam Treasure (2012) | Proposal (1997) | Mt. Livermore (1981) | Flama Ardiente (1972) |
| Dam Treasure (2012) | Proposal (1997) | Lady of Choice (1992) | Storm Bird (CAN) (1978) |
| Dam Treasure (2012) | Proposal (1997) | Lady of Choice (1992) | Chosen Lady (1987) (Family 4-c) |
