= Mineshaft (horse) =

American-bred racehorse (foaled 1999)

- Sire: A.P. Indy
- Grandsire: Seattle Slew
- Dam: Prospectors Delite
- Damsire: Mr. Prospector
- Sex: Stallion
- Foaled: May 17, 1999 (age 26)
- Country: United States
- Colour: Dark Brown
- Breeder: William S. Farish III, W. Temple Webber and James Elkins
- Owner: William Farish, W. Temple Webber, Jr. and James Elkins
- Trainer: Neil J. Howard
- Record: 18: 10-3-1
- Earnings: $2,283,402

Major wins
- Pimlico Special (2003); Jockey Club Gold Cup (2003); New Orleans Handicap (2003); Suburban Handicap (2003); Woodward Stakes (2003); Ben Ali Stakes (2003); Diplomat Way Handicap (2003)

Awards
- American Horse of the Year (2003); U.S. Champion Older Male Horse (2003)

Honors
- Fair Grounds Racing Hall of Fame (2005); Mineshaft Handicap at Fair Grounds (since 2005)
- Last updated on 11 February 2021

Mineshaft (foaled May 17, 1999, in Kentucky) is a multi-millionaire American thoroughbred racehorse and successful stallion. He was sired by 1992 U.S. Horse of the Year and U.S. Racing Hall of Fame inductee A.P. Indy, who in turn was a son of 1977 U.S. Triple Crown winner Seattle Slew. His dam, Prospectors Delite, is by leading North American sire Mr. Prospector. Bred and owned by the partnership of William S. Farish III, W. Temple Webber Jr. and James Elkins, Mineshaft is a product of Lane's End Farm. He finished racing with a record of 10–3–1 in 18 starts and career earnings of $2,283,402.

== Early career ==
Trained by Classic-winning trainer John Gosden, Mineshaft began his career racing on turf in Great Britain. Unraced at two, he won a mile maiden at Newmarket on his second start as a three-year-old. He failed to win another race in Great Britain but placed third in the Group Three Prix Daphnis in France. His record in Britain was 3-1-1 in seven starts, with annual earnings of $73,716.

== American career ==
Following his seven runs in Great Britain, Mineshaft was transferred to the United States as a three-year-old and moved to the barn of Neil J. Howard. In his North American debut, he won an allowance race by 3 1/2 lengths at a mile and 70 yards at Fair Grounds Race Course in 1:38.97. He finished 2002 with another allowance score at a mile at Churchill Downs in 1:36.2.

With his late success, Mineshaft remained in the U.S. at age four. He started the year at Fair Grounds Race Course in the winter and won the $75,000 Diplomat Way Handicap at 8 1/2 furlongs in 1:43.8. Mineshaft followed that up with a runner-up finish in the $125,000 Grade III Whirlaway Handicap, losing to Balto Star. He then won the $500,000 Grade II New Orleans Handicap at nine furlongs in 1:48.9, by 3 1/2 lengths before shipping to Kentucky to win the $100,000 Grade III Ben Ali Stakes at Keeneland by nine lengths in a time of 1:48.52.

Then Mineshaft ran in the $600,000 Grade I Pimlico Special Handicap at "Old Hilltop" in Baltimore, Maryland. A field of nine faced 6-5 favorite Mineshaft and Triple Crown veteran Balto Star, who was sent off at 4–1. When the gate opened, Balto Star was sent to the front and led the field through the first half mile, setting fractions of 23.1 and 46.7 over the sloppy track. The 7–2 second choice, Western Pride, stalked him in second and inherited the lead when Balto Star dropped out of contention, going 3/4 miles in 1:11. Turning for home, Mineshaft, who had stalked the pace saving ground early, was eased out three wide on the far turn and passed Western Pride after a mile in 1:36 to win going away by 3 3/4 lengths in a final time of 1:56.16. It was a head back to 42–1 longshot Judge's Case in third.

Among his victories later that year, Mineshaft won three straight Grade I races at Belmont Park in New York. He started by winning the $500,000 Grade I Suburban Handicap by 2 1/4 lengths, beating Volponi, Dollar Bill, and Evening Attire. His next victory came in the $500,000 Woodward Stakes by 4 1/2 lengths over Hold That Tiger and Puzzlement. Then he won the $1 million Jockey Club Gold Cup, again beating Evening Attire, this time by 4 1/2 lengths, and ensuring his United States Horse of the Year honors. He finished the year with a record of 7–2–0 in nine starts and earnings of $2,209,686.

== Retirement ==
Mineshaft was retired from racing in October 2003 due to an injury in his right front ankle sustained after the Jockey Club Gold Cup. He stood at Lane's End Farm for his entire stud career, initially for a fee of $100,000. He stood for $10,000 in 2025.

Mineshaft was retired from stud duty following the 2025 breeding season.

=== Notable progeny ===
c = colt, f = filly, g = gelding

Foaled	Name	Sex	Major Wins
2007	Discreetly Mine	c	King's Bishop Stakes
2008	Dialed In	c	Florida Derby
2008	It's Tricky	f	Acorn Stakes, American Oaks, Ogden Phipps Handicap
2011	Bond Holder	c	FrontRunner Stakes
2011	Effinex	c	Clark Handicap
2013	Weep No More	f	Ashland Stakes
2014	True Timber	c	Cigar Mile Handicap
2018	Senor Buscador	c	Saudi Cup
