= Deputy Minister (horse) =

Canadian-bred Thoroughbred racehorse

- Sire: Vice Regent
- Grandsire: Northern Dancer
- Dam: Mint Copy
- Damsire: Bunty's Flight
- Sex: Stallion
- Foaled: 1979
- Country: Canada
- Colour: Dark Bay
- Breeder: Centurion Farm
- Owner: Centurion Stables; Kinghaven Farms; Due Process Stable
- Trainer: Bill Marko (1981); John J. Tammaro Jr. (1981-2); Reynaldo H. Nobles (1983)
- Record: 22: 12-2-2
- Earnings: US$696,964

Major wins
- Colin Stakes (1981); Clarendon Stakes (1981); Youthful Stakes (1981); Laurel Futurity (1981); Young America Stakes (1981); Tom Fool Handicap (1983); Gulfstream Park Sprint Championship (1983); Donn Handicap (1983)

Awards
- American Champion Two-Year-Old Male Horse (1981); Canadian Champion 2-Yr-Old Colt (1981); Canadian Horse of the Year (1981); Leading sire in North America (1997, 1998); Leading broodmare sire in North America (2007)

Honours
- Canadian Horse Racing Hall of Fame (1988); Deputy Minister Handicap at Gulfstream Park; Deputy Minister Stakes at Woodbine Racetrack

Deputy Minister (May 17, 1979 – September 10, 2004) was a Canadian-bred Thoroughbred horse racing Champion. At age two, he won eight out of his nine starts and was voted the winner of both the Sovereign and Eclipse Awards for Champion 2-Year-Old in Canada and the United States, respectively. He also received Canada's Sovereign Award for Horse of the Year. Although his three-year-old campaign was restricted by injury, Deputy Minister rebounded at age four with several major wins.

Retired to stud in 1984, Deputy Minister became an outstanding sire, leading the North American sire list in 1997 and 1998. His most famous offspring were Hall of Fame fillies Go For Wand and Open Mind, Belmont Stakes winner Touch Gold and Breeders' Cup Classic winner Awesome Again. Deputy Minister was inducted into the Canadian Horse Racing Hall of Fame in 1988.

== Background ==
Deputy Minister was a dark bay horse with a small white star on his forehead. He was bred in Ontario by Centurion Farms, owned by Mort and Marjoh Levy. He was sired by Vice Regent, a full brother to Canadian Champion Viceregal. Although Viceregal was the better racehorse, Vice Regent proved to be the better sire, leading the Canadian sire list 13 times. Both horses were by leading sire Northern Dancer and out of the talented racemare Victoria Regina, who was closely related to several Canadian champions including Victoria Park and Canadiana. Deputy Minister's dam Mint Copy was claimed by the Levys for only $6,250 and went on to become a stakes-placed racehorse. She also came from a distinguished female family.

Deputy Minister originally raced for the Levys, who sold a half interest to Kinghaven Farms during the colt's two-year-old campaign. Due Process Stables purchased a half interest in the colt in January 1982 for a reported $6 million, then became the horse's sole owner during 1983. Deputy Minister was trained by Bill Marko for his first six races as a two-year-old before he was moved to the barn of John J. Tammaro Jr. In 1983, Reynaldo Nobles became his new trainer.

Deputy Minister stood 16.2^{1}/_{2} hands (66.5 inches, 169 cm) high. He had an excellent shoulder and good hips but according to Tammaro was "unsound in the feet and ankles at all times." Fred Seitz, the owner of Brookdale Farm where he stood as a stallion, said, "He was a tough, masculine horse. He was a handful, but in a good sense."

== Racing career ==
=== 1981: Two-year-old campaign ===
At age two, Deputy Minister won eight of nine starts, including two Grade I wins in the United States. His only loss that year came in the Champagne Stakes where he finished fourth.

He won his first start in a maiden special weight race at Woodbine Racetrack on May 10, 1981. He then won his next five races, all stakes races:

- the Victoria Stakes on May 18 at Woodbine over a distance of 5 furlongs, setting a new track record of :57 1/5
- the Youthful Stakes on June 8 at Belmont Park over 5 1/2 furlongs
- the Clarendon Stakes on June 21 at Woodbine over 5 1/2 furlongs
- the Colin Stakes on July 11 at Woodbine over 6 furlongs
- the Bull Page Stakes on August 2 at Woodbine over 6 furlongs

A part interest in Deputy Minister was sold to Kinghaven Stables, for whom Tammaro was the private trainer. Marko was supposed to remain in charge of the colt with Tammaro acting as the overseer, but Marko reportedly resented the situation. After Marko did not get the necessary visas for the horse to race in the Hopeful Stakes in the United States in August, Deputy Minister was formally moved to the Tammaro's stable. Tammaro planned to enter him in the Arlington-Washington Futurity but the colt came down with a virus, causing a short layoff. He returned to racing on October 10 in the Grade I Champagne Stakes, finishing fourth. He quickly rebounded with two Grade I stakes wins:

- the Laurel Futurity on October 24 at Laurel Park over 8 1/2 furlongs, and
- the Young America Stakes on November 5 at the Meadowlands over 8 1/2 furlongs

Deputy Minister was named the Canadian Horse of the Year and also received Sovereign and Eclipse Awards as the Champion Two-Year Colt in Canada and the United States respectively. On the Experimental Free Handicap, he was the co-highweight with Timely Writer at 126 pounds, the first Canadian-bred horse to achieve this honor.

=== 1982: Three-year-old campaign ===
Deputy Minister started 1982 as one of the early favorites for the Kentucky Derby. He made his first start of the year on January 27 in the Bahamas Stakes at Hialeah Park as the even money favorite, but finished a well beaten fifth behind the lightly regarded Aloma's Ruler, who later went on to win the Preakness Stakes. After the race, Deputy Minister was diagnosed with a severely bruised and wrenched right front ankle. Trying to stay on target for the Derby, Deputy Minister returned to racing on February 24 in a $25,000 prep race for the Flamingo Stakes but finished ninth. His jockey Don MacBeth said the colt felt sound, but Tammaro subsequently withdrew him from the Flamingo. Deputy Minister would not return to racing until October 28 when he won an allowance race at Woodbine. He finished the year with a seventh-place finish in the Sports Page Handicap at Aqueduct on November 21.

=== 1983: Four-year-old campaign ===
In 1983 and now trained by Nobles, Deputy Minister won three straight races:

- the Gulfstream Park Sprint Championship at Gulfstream Park on January 29 at a distance of 7 furlongs
- the Donn Handicap at Gulfstream on February 12 at a distance of 9 furlongs, and
- the Tom Fool Handicap at Belmont Park on July 17 at a distance of 7 furlongs

"You wouldn't believe what this horse's foot looked like in February," said Nobles after the Tom Fool. "He only had half a foot. He'd gotten it all infected with a piece of gravel, and we had to cut half his foot out. But it grew back, and he's all recovered from all his physical problems right now. He's the best he's ever been."

The Tom Fool proved to be Deputy Minister's last win. In his last six starts, Deputy Minister finished second twice (in the Meadowlands Cup and the Stuyvesant Handicap), third twice (in an allowance race and the Vosburgh Stakes) and was unplaced twice. In his final start in the Meadowlands Cup, he broke slowly and encountered traffic problem but was still beaten by just a neck. Sportswriter Steven Crist called him "game and gallant in defeat."

== Retirement ==
Deputy Minister was retired to stand at stud at the Maryland branch of Windfields Farm, where he sired future U.S. Hall of Famer Go for Wand. In 1989, Windfields closed down its Maryland branch after the retirement of Northern Dancer. As a result, Deputy Minister was moved to Fred Seitz's Brookdale Farm in Versailles, Kentucky, where he spent the rest of his life. A career sire of 90 Graded stakes race winners, Deputy Minister was the leading sire in North America in 1997 and 1998. Several sons went on to become successful stallions while his daughters also became successful producers, causing Deputy Minister to be the leading broodmare sire of 2007. His stud fee reached $150,000 for the years 1999 to 2002.

In 1988, he was inducted into the Canadian Horse Racing Hall of Fame.

Deputy Minister died of a malignant tumor at the Ohio State University veterinary hospital in Columbus, Ohio, and was buried at Brookdale Farm.

=== Selected progeny ===
Deputy Minister was the sire of 90 stakes winners, 17 of whom were Grade I winners, including:

- Go For Wand : Champion Filly at ages two (1989) and three (1990) with seven GI wins, U.S. Racing Hall of Fame (1996)
- Open Mind : won seven Grade I stakes including Breeders' Cup Juvenile Fillies, voted American Champion Two-Year-Old Filly (1988)
  American Champion Three-Year-Old Filly (1989), Hall of Fame inductee (2011)
- Awesome Again : Queen's Plate (1997), Breeders' Cup Classic (1998), Canadian Horse Racing Hall of Fame (2001)
- Touch Gold : Belmont Stakes (1997), Haskell Invitational Handicap (1997)
- Deputy Commander : Travers Stakes (1997), Super Derby (1997)
- Dehere : U.S. Champion 2-Year-Old-Colt (1993)
- Mane Minister : won Santa Catalina Stakes (1991), third in all three American Triple Crown races
- Keeper Hill : Las Virgenes Stakes (1998), Kentucky Oaks (1998)
- Yarrow Brae : won Illinois Derby, placed in Derby Trial Stakes, Jim Beam Stakes, and Golden State Mile Stakes (all in 1998)

Several of Deputy Minister's sons went on to become successful sires themselves. Deputy Minister is the grandsire of such notable horses as:

- Ghostzapper, by Awesome Again – Hall of Fame inductee, American Horse of the Year (2004), World's Top Ranked Horse (2004)
- Silverbulletday, by Silver Deputy – Hall of Fame inductee, American Champion 2-Year-Old Filly of 1998 and Champion 3-Year-Old Filly of 1999. Multiple G1 race winner including the Breeders' Cup Juvenile Fillies, Kentucky Oaks
- Wilko, by Awesome Again – 2004 Breeders' Cup Juvenile
- Archers Bay, by Silver Deputy – Canadian Champion Three-Year-Old Colt
- Left Bank, by French Deputy – 2002 American Champion Older Male Horse
- Kurofune, by French Deputy – 1998 Japanese Champion Dirt Horse
- Round Pond, by Awesome Again – Breeders' Cup Distaff (2006)
- Deputy Glitters, by Deputy Commander – Ohio Derby (2006), Tampa Bay Derby (2006)
- Ginger Punch, by Awesome Again – multiple G1 winner including 2007 Breeders' Cup Distaff, Champion Older Female Horse of 2007
- Paynter, by Awesome Again – Haskell Invitational Handicap (2012)
- Oxbow, by Awesome Again – Preakness Stakes (2013)
- Game On Dude, by Awesome Again – multiple graded stakes winner

Deputy Minister was also an outstanding broodmare sire, leading the North American list in 2007 thanks mainly to Horse of the Year Curlin. One of his daughters, Better Than Honour, became Kentucky Broodmare of the Year after siring back-to-back winners of the Belmont Stakes, Jazil and Rags To Riches. Deputy Minister is the damsire of many notable horses including:

- Sarava : winner of the 2002 Belmont Stakes
- Halfbridled : Breeders' Cup Juvenile Fillies (2003), U.S. Champion 2-Yr-Old Filly (2003)
- Kane Hekili, multi-millionaire colt, won four Grade 1 races in Japan including the 2005 Japan Cup Dirt
- Bob and John : Wood Memorial Stakes (2006)
- Jazil : Belmont Stakes (2006)
- Curlin : 2007 and 2008 American Horse of the Year, Preakness Stakes, Breeders' Cup Classic, Dubai World Cup, two-time winner of the Jockey Club Gold Cup
- Rags to Riches : Kentucky Oaks (2007), Belmont Stakes (2007), American Champion Three-Year-Old Filly (2007)
- Man of Iron : Breeders' Cup Marathon (2009)
- Tapizar : 2012 Breeders' Cup Dirt Mile
- Frosted : 2015 Wood Memorial, 2016 Metropolitan Handicap and Whitney Handicap

== Pedigree ==
Pedigree of Deputy Minister
Sire Vice Regent	Northern Dancer	Nearctic	Nearco
Sire Vice Regent	Northern Dancer	Nearctic	Lady Angela
Sire Vice Regent	Northern Dancer	Natalma	Native Dancer
Sire Vice Regent	Northern Dancer	Natalma	Almahmoud
Sire Vice Regent	Victoria Regina	Menetrier	Fair Copy
Sire Vice Regent	Victoria Regina	Menetrier	La Melodie
Sire Vice Regent	Victoria Regina	Victoriana	Windfields
Sire Vice Regent	Victoria Regina	Victoriana	Iribelle
Dam Mint Copy	Bunty's Flight	Bunty Lawless	Ladder
Dam Mint Copy	Bunty's Flight	Bunty Lawless	Mintwina
Dam Mint Copy	Bunty's Flight	Broomflight	Deil
Dam Mint Copy	Bunty's Flight	Broomflight	Air Post
Dam Mint Copy	Shakney	Jabneh	Bimelech
Dam Mint Copy	Shakney	Jabneh	Bellesoeur
Dam Mint Copy	Shakney	Grass Shack	Polynesian
Dam Mint Copy	Shakney	Grass Shack	Good Example
