= Distaff Stakes =

- Class: Grade III
- Location: Aqueduct Racetrack; Ozone Park, New York, United States
- Inaugurated: 1954 (as the Distaff Handicap)
- Race type: Thoroughbred – Flat racing
- Website: NYRA

Race information
- Distance: 7 furlongs
- Surface: Dirt
- Track: left-handed
- Qualification: Fillies and Mares, four-years-old and older
- Weight: 124lbs with allowances
- Purse: US$175,000 (since 2024)

The Distaff Stakes is a Grade III American Thoroughbred horse race for fillies and mares that are four years old or older at a distance of seven furlongs on the dirt run annually in early April at Aqueduct Racetrack in Ozone Park, Queens, New York. The event currently offers a purse of $175,000.

== History ==
The event was inaugurated on 28 June 1954 as the Distaff Handicap at the old Aqueduct racetrack, and was won by Robert S. Howard's British mare Mab's Choice, who was trained by the future US Hall of Fame trainer Charles E. Whittingham in a time of 1:24 2/5. Mab's Choice was a 20-1 longshot in the field who had not won a race in two years came through with a late drive to win by 1/2 length.

After the 1955 season the old Aqueduct track was close for reconstruction for a period of four years. During the four years from 1956 to 1959 the event was held at Belmont Park during the summer or late spring.

On Wednesday, 20 April 1960 the event was scheduled back at the new Aqueduct racetrack and 29,195 were on hand to see the odds-on favorite Mommy Dear win by 2 lengths.

The event was run in two split divisions in 1964. This was only time that the event was run in split divisions.

In 1973 the first year the classification system was enacted, the event was set with Grade III status.

In 1989 the event was upgraded as Grade II.

The event has been run at a shorter distance of 6 furlongs in several times and on the inter dirt track in 1994 and from 2006 to 2009.

The event was scheduled for 13 March 1993 but postponed twice due to bad weather before finally being cancelled.

In 2016 the event was downgraded to Grade III status.

In 2020 due to the COVID-19 pandemic in the United States, Aqueduct closed their track and the event was cancelled.

In 2024 the conditions of the event were changed from handicap to stakes allowance and this the events name was modified to the Distaff Stakes.

== Records ==
Speed record:

- 7 furlongs – 1:21.18 Devil's Orchid (1991)
- 6 furlongs – 1:09.10 La Verdad (2014)

Margins:

- 14 lengths – Ride Sally (1986)

Most wins:

- 2 – La Verdad (2014, 2015)
- 2 – Happy Princess (1958, 1959)

Most wins by a jockey:

- 4 – Ángel Cordero Jr. (1976, 1983, 1984, 1987)
- 4 – Richard Migliore (1997, 1998, 2004, 2005)

Most wins by a trainer:

- 3 – Claude R. McGaughey III (1988, 1995, 1999)
- 3 – Linda L. Rice (2014, 2015, 2018)

Most wins by an owner:

- 3 – Lady Sheila Stable (2014, 2015, 2018)

== Winners ==
Year	Winner	Age	Jockey	Trainer	Owner	Distance	Time	Purse	Grade	Ref
At Aqueduct – Distaff Stakes
2026	Grammy Girl	5	Javier Castellano	Saffie A. Joseph Jr.	Red Storm Stable, Miller Racing & Flower Power Stables	7 furlongs	1:23.47	$139,500	III	
2025	Irish Maxima	4	Frankie Pennington	John C. Servis	Irish Three Racing	7 furlongs	1:22.92	$169,750	III	
2024	Shidabhuti	4	Dylan Davis	Chad C. Brown	Peter M. Brant	7 furlongs	1:23.86	$169,750	III	
Distaff Handicap
2023	Mommasgottarun	4	Eric Cancel	Linda Rice	Ronald P. Stewart	7 furlongs	1:21.29	$150,000	III	
2022	Glass Ceiling	5	Dylan Davis	Charlton Baker	Michael S. Foster	7 furlongs	1:21.71	$145,500	III	
2021	Paris Lights	4	Junior Alvarado	William I. Mott	WinStar Stablemates Racing	7 furlongs	1:26.99	$145,500	III	
2020	Race not held									
2019	Come Dancing	4	Manuel Franco	Carlos F. Martin	Blue Devil Racing Stable	7 furlongs	1:22.31	$150,000	III	
2018	Holiday Disguise	4	Irad Ortiz Jr.	Linda L. Rice	Lady Sheila Stable	7 furlongs	1:22.98	$150,000	III	
2017	Highway Star	4	Angel S. Arroyo	Rodrigo A. Ubillo	Chester Broman Sr. & Mary R. Broman	7 furlongs	1:22.25	$150,000	III	
2016	Paulassilverlining	4	Jose L. Ortiz	Michelle Nevin	Vincent S. Scuderi	7 furlongs	1:22.01	$200,000	III	
2015	La Verdad	5	Jose L. Ortiz	Linda L. Rice	Lady Sheila Stable	6 furlongs	1:10.00	$190,000	II	
2014	La Verdad	4	Jose L. Ortiz	Linda L. Rice	Lady Sheila Stable	6 furlongs	1:09.10	$200,000	II	
2013	Cluster of Stars	4	Junior Alvarado	Steven M. Asmussen	Turtle Bird Stable	6 furlongs	1:10.14	$190,000	II	
2012	It's Tricky	4	Eddie Castro	Kiaran P. McLaughlin	Godolphin Racing	7 furlongs	1:22.39	$196,000	II	
2011	Nicole H	4	Channing Hill	Michael E. Hushion	Gem, Inc (Dr. John Waken)	7 furlongs	1:23.29	$147,000	II	
2010	Tar Heel Mom	5	Ramon A. Dominguez	Stanley M. Hough	Alex Rankin	7 furlongs	1:24.51	$147,000	II	
2009	Secret Gypsy	4	Robby Albarado	Ronny W. Werner	Richland Hills Stable & John Kuehl	6 furlongs	1:10.01	$149,800	II	
2008	Rite Moment	4	Rajiv Maragh	Gary C. Contessa	Winning Move Stable, Seidman Stables, John L. Moirano & Ravenwood Stable	6 furlongs	1:09.86	$143,900	II	
2007	Maryfield	6	Jorge F. Chavez	Doug F. O'Neill	Mark Gorman, Nick J. Mestrandrea & Jim Perry	6 furlongs	1:09.73	$158,500	II	
2006	Smokey Glacken	5	Javier Castellano	James A. Jerkens	Susan & John Moore	6 furlongs	1:10.49	$154,500	II	
2005	Bank Audit	4	Richard Migliore	Frank LaBoccetta Jr.	Robert J. Amendola	7 furlongs	1:22.07	$148,900	II	
2004	Randaroo	4	Richard Migliore	Kiaran P. McLaughlin	H. Joseph Allen	7 furlongs	1:22.64	$146,400	II	
2003	Carson Hollow	4	Michael J. Luzzi	Richard E. Dutrow Jr.	Stronach Stables & Hemlock Hills Farm	7 furlongs	1:22.42	$152,400	II	
2002	Raging Fever	4	John R. Velazquez	Mark A. Hennig	Edward P. Evans	7 furlongs	1:21.78	$142,300	II	
2001	Dream Supreme	4	Aaron Gryder	William I. Mott	Kinsman Stable	7 furlongs	1:23.66	$181,600	II	
2000	Honest Lady	4	Brice Blanc	Robert J. Frankel	Juddmonte Farms	7 furlongs	1:22.10	$183,250	II	
1999	Furlough	5	Heberto Castillo Jr.	Claude R. McGaughey III	Ogden Phipps	7 furlongs	1:23.23	$174,350	II	
1998	Parlay	4	Richard Migliore	John C. Kimmel	Ackerly Brothers Farm	7 furlongs	1:24.10	$112,100	II	
1997	Miss Golden Circle	5	Richard Migliore	John C. Kimmel	Caesar P. Kimmel	7 furlongs	1:24.47	$109,000	II	
1996	Lottsa Talc	6	Frank T. Alvarado	Timothy D. Kelly	Vincent McGuire	7 furlongs	1:24.04	$119,700	II	
1995	Recognizable	4	Mike E. Smith	Claude R. McGaughey III	Ogden Mills Phipps	7 furlongs	1:22.94	$110,900	II	
1994	§ Classy Mirage	4	Robbie Davis	H. Allen Jerkens	Middletown Stable	6 furlongs	1:11.37	$110,800	II	
1993	Race not held									
1992	Nannerl	5	Mike E. Smith	Flint S. Schulhofer	Marablue Farm	7 furlongs	1:24.68	$114,800	II	
1991	Devil's Orchid	4	Russell Baze	Richard E. Mandella	George Yates	7 furlongs	1:21.18	$111,800	II	
1990	Channel Three	4	Jorge F. Chavez	Michael J. Goswell	Mrs. Henry Elser	7 furlongs	1:23.20	$90,150	II	
1989	Avie's Gal	4	Nick Santagata	John J. Lenzini Jr.	John R. Cioci	7 furlongs	1:24.00	$86,100	II	
1988	Cadillacing	5	Randy Romero	Claude R. McGaughey III	Ogden Phipps	7 furlongs	1:22.60	$84,550	III	
1987	Pine Tree Lane	5	Angel Cordero Jr.	D. Wayne Lukas	Leonard Mathis	7 furlongs	1:22.00	$87,750	III	
1986	Ride Sally	5	Walter Guerra	Nicholas P. Zito	Manhasset Stable	7 furlongs	1:21.60	$90,900	III	
1985	Give Me A Hint	5	Wesley A. Ward	Braulio Baeza	Nathaniel Usdan	7 furlongs	1:25.20	$91,600	III	
1984	Am Capable	4	Angel Cordero Jr.	John Parisella	Theodore Sabarese	6 furlongs	1:11.00	$87,150	III	
1983	Jones Time Machine	4	Angel Cordero Jr.	John Parisella	Theodore Sabarese	7 furlongs	1:23.20	$54,800	III	
1982	Lady Dean	4	Donald A. Miller Jr.	Ronald A. Alfano	David P. Reynolds	7 furlongs	1:23.80	$55,000	III	
1981	Lady Oakley (IRE)	4	Jeffrey Fell	Warren J. Pascuma	Bette S. Karlinsky	7 furlongs	1:25.40	$56,500	III	
1980	Misty Gallore	4	Donald MacBeth	Thomas J. Kelly	Spring Hill Stable	7 furlongs	1:24.60	$55,200	III	
1979	Skipat	5	James W. Edwards	Daniel L. Hasbany	John A. Grondin	6 furlongs	1:10.40	$54,200	III	
1978	Vandy Sue	4	Angel M. Rodriguez	Ramon M. Hernandez	Assunta Louis Farm	6 furlongs	1:12.00	$36,975	III	
1977	What A Summer	5	Eddie Maple	LeRoy Jolley	Diana M. Firestone	6 furlongs	1:11.60	$36,675	III	
1976	Shy Dawn	5	Angel Cordero Jr.	Woodrow M. Sedlacek	Jacques D. Wimpfheimer	7 furlongs	1:24.20	$37,650	III	
1975	Something Super	5	Jean Cruguet	Willard C. Freeman	Skara Glen Stable	7 furlongs	1:22.20	$28,325	III	
1974	Krislin	5	Vincent Bracciale Jr.	Stephen A. DiMauro	Harold I. Snyder	7 furlongs	1:22.00	$27,450	III	
1973	Ferly	5	Ron Turcotte	Frank Catrone	Ada L. Rice	7 furlongs	1:24.00	$28,200	III	
1972	§ Royal Signal	5	Chuck Baltazar	Stephen A. DiMauro	Mrs. Lawrence W. Knapp Jr.	7 furlongs	1:24.20	$27,575		
1971	Double Delta	5	Braulio Baeza	Stanley M. Reiser	James D. Drymon	7 furlongs	1:22.80	$33,300		
1970	Process Shot	4	Chuck Baltazar	J. Bowes Bond	Elberon Farm	7 furlongs	1:22.80	$28,000		
1969	Heartland	4	John L. Rotz	Max Hirsch	King Ranch	7 furlongs	1:22.40	$28,000		
1968	Just Kidding	4	Jorge Velásquez	J. Elliott Burch	Rokeby Stable	7 furlongs	1:23.20	$28,300		
1967	§ Cologne	4	Braulio Baeza	Frank H. Merrill Jr.	Mrs. Romola Voynow	7 furlongs	1:24.20	$27,800		
1966	Sailor Princess	4	Gary Mineau	Burley Parke	Harbor View Farm	7 furlongs	1:22.40	$27,850		
1965	Affectionately	5	Walter Blum	Hirsch Jacobs	Ethel D. Jacobs	7 furlongs	1:24.00	$27,850		
1964	Charspiv	4	Bobby Ussery	Buddy Jacobson	Marion R. Frankel	7 furlongs	1:24.00	$21,300		Division 1
1964	Smart Deb	4	Bill Hartack	Arnold N. Winick	Mrs. Russell L. Reineman	7 furlongs	1:25.20	$21,300		Division 2
1963	Cicada	4	Bill Shoemaker	J. Homer Hayes	Meadow Stable	7 furlongs	1:21.60	$23,950		
1962	Rose O'Neill	4	Ismael Valenzuela	Ted Saladin	Bert W. Martin	7 furlongs	1:23.80	$23,100		
1961	Teacation	4	Ray Broussard	Charles R. Parke	Fred W. Hooper	7 furlongs	1:23.60	$22,650		
1960	Mommy Dear	4	Manuel Ycaza	Eddie Hayward	Circle M. Farm	7 furlongs	1:23.00	$27,550		
At Belmont Park
1959	Happy Princess	7	Hedley Woodhouse	George Lewis	Mabel D. Lewis	7 furlongs	1:24.20	$28,600		
1958	Happy Princess	6	Hedley Woodhouse	George Lewis	Mabel D. Lewis	7 furlongs	1:24.00	$24,500		
1957	Searching	5	Conn McCreary	Hirsch Jacobs	Ethel D. Jacobs	7 furlongs	1:24.40	$23,950		
1956	Blue Banner	4	Eddie Arcaro	Jack Skinner	Rokeby Stable	7 furlongs	1:23.80	$22,350		
At Aqueduct
1955	Oil Painting	4	Hedley Woodhouse	Anthony W. Rupelt	Mrs. Joseph A. Goodwin	7 furlongs	1:24.00	$29,350		
1954	Mab's Choice (GB)	5	Angel Valenzuela	Charles E. Whittingham	Robert S. Howard	7 furlongs	1:24.40	$30,050		

Notes:
§ Ran as an entry

== See also ==
- List of American and Canadian Graded races
