= Correction Stakes =

- Class: Ungraded stakes
- Location: Aqueduct Racetrack; South Ozone Park, Queens, New York, United States
- Inaugurated: 1940
- Race type: Thoroughbred – Flat racing
- Website: NYRA – Aqueduct Racetrack

Race information
- Distance: Six furlong sprint
- Surface: Dirt
- Track: left-handed
- Qualification: Four-years-old & up
- Purse: $100,000

The Correction Stakes is an American Thoroughbred horse race run annually at Aqueduct Racetrack in Ozone Park, Queens, New York. A non-graded stakes race for fillies and mares age four and older, it is raced on dirt over a distance of six furlongs. It currently offers a purse of $100,000. Inaugurated in 1940 at Jamaica Race Course, following that track's closure the race was moved in 1960 to its current location at Aqueduct Racetrack. The race was named in honor of Correction, a filly owned by John Morris and his son, Alfred, and trained by U. S. Racing Hall of Fame inductee, R. Wyndham Walden.

The race was open to fillies and mares age three and older from inception through 2014 with the exception of 1952 when it was made available to fillies and mares of all ages. In 2015 the race was changed to a contest for fillies and mares four years and older.

The inaugural Correction Handicap took place on October 19, 1940 and was won by Calumet Farm's filly Little Risk ridden by George Woolf and trained by Jimmy Jones, both future Hall of Fame inductees.

In 1954 and 1955 it was run in two divisions.

== Records ==
Speed record:

- 1:09.20 @ 6 Furlongs – Soul Mate (1973)

Most wins:

- 2 – Searching (1958, 1959)
- 2 – Affectionately (1964, 1965)
- 2 – Shy Dawn (1976, 1977)
- 2 – Cagey Exuberance (1988, 1989)
- 2 – Missy's Mirage (1992, 1993)
- 2 – Magnolia Jackson (2006, 2007)
- 2 – Clothes Fall Off (2016, 2017)

Most wins by a jockey:

- 7 – Ángel Cordero Jr. (1976, 1977, 1983, 1984, 1986, 1988, 1990)

Most wins by a trainer:

- 4 – Hirsch Jacobs (1956, 1958, 1964, 1965)
- 4 – Kiaran P. McLaughlin (2005, 2015, 2016, 2017)

Most wins by an owner:

- 4 – Ethel D. Jacobs (1956, 1958, 1964, 1965)

== Winners ==
| Year | Winner | Age | Jockey | Trainer | Owner | Dist. (Miles) | Time | Win$ |
|---|---|---|---|---|---|---|---|---|
| 2026 | With the Angels | 4 | Jose Lezcano | Linda Rice | Winning Move Stables, John C. Oxley, Lady Shelia Stable, Silverwood Stable & Sanford H. Robbins, LLC | 6 F | 1:10.97 | $74,250 |
| 2025 | Sunday Girl | 4 | Katie Davis | David P. Duggan | Mitre Stable, Clear Stars Stables & Eighth Note Stable | 6 F | 1:13.50 | $55,000 |
| 2024 | Hot Fudge | 5 | Kendrick Carmouche | Adam Rice | KEM Stables | 6 F | 1:10.99 | $55,000 |
| 2023 | Rossa Veloce | 5 | Manuel Franco | Rob Atras | Robert A. Derr | 6 F | 1:11.16 | $55,000 |
| 2022 | Race not held | | | | | | | |
| 2021 | Sadie Lady | 5 | Manuel Franco | Rob Atras | Dennis Narlinger | 6 F | 1.11.98 | $55,000 |
| 2020 | Piedi Bianchi | 5 | Jorge A. Vargas Jr. | Carlos F. Martin | Jack Oringer & Madaket Stables | 6 F | 1:13.51 | $55,000 |
| 2019 | Startwithsilver | 6 | Junior Alvarado | Linda Rice | Lady Sheila Stable & Iris Smith Stable | 6 F | 1:11.19 | $60,000 |
| 2018 | Sounds Delicious | 4 | Ángel Arroyo | Linda Rice | Stud El Aguila | 6 F | 1:11.25 | $60,000 |
| 2017 | Clothes Fall Off | 5 | Rajiv Maragh | Kiaran P. McLaughlin | Cheyenne Stables LLC (Everett Dobson) | 6 F | 1:11.06 | $75,000 |
| 2016 | Clothes Fall Off | 4 | Manuel Franco | Kiaran P. McLaughlin | Cheyenne Stables LLC, Southern Equine Stable LLC, Hat Creek Racing | 6 F | 1:10:68 | $75,000 |
| 2015 | Mamdooha | 4 | Irad Ortiz Jr. | Kiaran P. McLaughlin | Shadwell Stable | 6 F | 1:12:67 | $60,000 |
| 2014 | Lion D N A | 5 | Charles C. Lopez | Rudy R. Rodriguez | Michael Dubb, Bethlehem Stables LLC, Gary Aisquith | 6 F | 1:11.32 | $60,000 |
| 2013 | Cluster of Stars | 4 | Javier Castellano | Steven M. Asmussen | Turtle Bird Stable | 6 F | 1:09.66 | $39,000 |
| 2012 | Nicole H | 5 | Ramon Domínguez | Michael E. Hushion | Gem Inc. (Waken) | 6 F | 1:11.08 | $60,000 |
| 2011 | Kid Kate | 4 | Ramon Domínguez | Chad C. Brown | Dell Ridge Farm (Frank Justice) | 6 F | 1:10.30 | $39,000 |
| 2010 | Hold That Prospect | 5 | Jorge Chavez | Gary P. Gullo | Funky Munky Stable LLC (Richard Munk, managing partner) | 6 F | 1:11.23 | $39,000 |
| 2009 | Distorted Passion | 4 | Rajiv Maragh | Todd A. Pletcher | Gulf Coast Farms LLC | 6 F | 1:11.94 | $42,276 |
| 2008 | Beau Dare | 5 | Chuck C. Lopez | Bruce N. Levine | Walts David Stable | 6 F | 1:10.96 | $48,630 |
| 2007 | Magnolia Jackson | 5 | Alan Garcia | Gary C. Contessa | Ted Taylor | 6 F | 1:10.18 | $41,925 |
| 2006 | Magnolia Jackson | 4 | Norberto Arroyo Jr. | Gary C. Contessa | Ted Taylor | 6 F | 1:10.24 | $41,847 |
| 2005 | Lavender Lass | 5 | Rafael Bejarano | Kiaran P. McLaughlin | Lucky Lavender Stable | 6 F | 1:12.80 | $47,925 |
| 2004 | She's Zealous | 4 | Mike Luzzi | Richard E. Dutrow Jr. | Jay Em Ess Stable | 6 F | 1:10.00 | $49,725 |
| 2003 | A. P. Andie | 5 | Luis Chavez | Jason J. Servis | Bruce Garafolo | 6 F | 1:11.00 | $49,935 |
| 2002 | City Fair | 5 | Shaun Bridgmohan | D. Wayne Lukas | Overbrook Farm | 6 F | 1:11.40 | $49,665 |
| 2001 | Fickle Fanny | 5 | Cornelio Velásquez | Richard E. Schosberg | Richard A. Englander | 6 F | 1:10.80 | $48,330 |
| 2000 | Di's Time | 5 | Cornelio Velásquez | Gary Sciacca | James Schurman | 6 F | 1:09.60 | $50,310 |
| 1999 | Flamingo Way | 5 | Julio Pezua | Roy Sedlacek | Blue Stork Stable (Rick Franco) | 6 F | 1:11.00 | $39,528 |
| 1998 | Lynclar | 6 | Jose L. Espinoza | Michael E. Hushion | Barry K. Schwartz | 6 F | 1:10.20 | $39,528 |
| 1997 | Stormy Krissy | 4 | Herb McCauley | Joseph A. Aquilino | Paraneck Stables | 6 F | 1:10.60 | $33,210 |
| 1996 | Traverse City | 6 | Ramon Perez | William I. Mott | Charles Armstrong | 6 F | 1:10.80 | $32,850 |
| 1995 | Lottsa Talc | 5 | Diane Nelson | Timothy D. Kelly | Vincent McGuire & Charles Werner | 6 F | 1:11.00 | $50,160 |
| 1994 | Jill Miner | 4 | Mike Luzzi | William I. Mott | Ellis M. Gillum | 6 F | 1:11.20 | $48,960 |
| 1993 | Missy's Mirage | 5 | Eddie Maple | H. Allen Jerkens | Middletown Stable (Joseph & William Stavola) | 6 F | 1:11.00 | $40,620 |
| 1992 | Missy's Mirage | 4 | Eddie Maple | H. Allen Jerkens | Middletown Stable (Joseph & William Stavola) | 6 F | 1:10.00 | $40,740 |
| 1991 | Your Hope | 6 | John R. Velazquez | Richard E. Dutrow Sr. | Alvin Akman | 6 F | 1:09.80 | $40,262 |
| 1990 | My Caravann | 5 | Ángel Cordero Jr. | Bruce N. Levine | Basil J. Plasteras | 6 F | 1:12.60 | $41,160 |
| 1989 | Cagey Exuberance | 5 | Richard Migliore | Robert W. Camac | Lindsey Burbank | 6 F | 1:10.80 | $40,740 |
| 1988 | Cagey Exuberance | 4 | Ángel Cordero Jr. | Robert W. Camac | Lindsey Burbank | 6 F | 1:09.60 | $40,440 |
| 1987 | Sound Reasoning | 4 | Jean-Luc Samyn | Philip G. Johnson | Sugar Maple Farm | 6 F | 1:10.80 | $41,700 |
| 1986 | Gene's Lady | 5 | Ángel Cordero Jr. | D. Wayne Lukas | Eugene V. Klein | 6 F | 1:10.00 | $40,740 |
| 1985 | Jolly Mariner | 4 | Mike Venezia | John Parisella | Theodore M. Sabarese | 6 F | 1:10.60 | $52,560 |
| 1984 | Am Capable | 4 | Ángel Cordero Jr. | John Parisella | Theodore M. Sabarese | 6 F | 1:11.60 | $41,940 |
| 1983 | Jones Time Machine | 4 | Ángel Cordero Jr. | John Parisella | Theodore M. Sabarese | 6 F | 1:10.40 | $33,000 |
| 1982 | Matching | 4 | Gregg McCarron | Steven Morguelan | John W. Greathouse Jr. | 6 F | 1:11.00 | $33,840 |
| 1981 | The Wheel Turns | 4 | Jeffrey Fell | Leonard H. Hunt | Fast Breaking Stable | 6 F | 1:12.60 | $33,240 |
| 1980 | Misty Native | 5 | Cash Asmussen | Robert DeBonis | Gertrude A. Martin | 6 F | 1:11.40 | $32,580 |
| 1979 | Con Celia | 5 | Ruben Hernandez | Alberto Pla | Cayetana Diaz | 6 F | 1:13.60 | $32,130 |
| 1978 | Bold Brat | 5 | James Moseley | Carlos A. Garcia | Boginod Farm | 6 F | 1:11.00 | $25,470 |
| 1977 | Shy Dawn | 6 | Ángel Cordero Jr. | Woodrow C. Sedlacek | Jacques D. Wimpfheimer | 6 F | 1:11.00 | $21,930 |
| 1976 | Shy Dawn | 5 | Ángel Cordero Jr. | Woodrow C. Sedlacek | Jacques D. Wimpfheimer | 6 F | 1:10.00 | $22,920 |
| 1975 | Viva La Vivi | 5 | Jorge Velásquez | Harold Hodosh | Harold Hodosh | 6 F | 1:09.40 | $33540 |
| 1974 | Klepto | 4 | Daryl Montoya | Jerry Hirsch | Leon J. Hekimian | 6 F | 1:09.40 | $33,360 |
| 1973 | Soul Mate | 4 | Braulio Baeza | Lazaro S. Barrera | Robert R. Dodderidge | 6 F | 1:09.20 | $16,410 |
| 1972 | Race not held | | | | | | | |
| 1971 | Arachne | 4 | Robert Woodhouse | Flint S. Schulhofer | Tartan Stable | 6 F | 1:11.60 | $19,410 |
| 1970 | Ta Wee | 4 | John L. Rotz | Flint S. Schulhofer | Tartan Stable | 6 F | 1:11.20 | $18,102 |
| 1969 | Native Tree | 4 | Jacinto Vásquez | James P. Conway | Robert E. Lehman | 6 F | 1:10.00 | $17,875 |
| 1968 | Codorniz | 6 | Robert Ussery | Arnold N. Winick | Maribel G. Blum | 6 F | 1:11.20 | $18,850 |
| 1967 | Miss Moona | 4 | Laffit Pincay Jr. | Steve Ippolito | Jacnot Stable (Jack R. Hogan) | 6 F | 1:15.60 | $17,940 |
| 1966 | Empress Queen | 4 | Kenneth Knapp | Edward A. Neloy | Wheatley Stable | 6 F | 1:11.20 | $18,232 |
| 1965 | Affectionately | 5 | Braulio Baeza | Hirsch Jacobs | Ethel D. Jacobs | 6 F | 1:11.00 | $17,907 |
| 1964 | Affectionately | 4 | Wayne Chambers | Hirsch Jacobs | Ethel D. Jacobs | 6 F | 1:10.80 | $18,915 |
| 1963 | Red Belle | 4 | William Boland | H. Allen Jerkens | Hobeau Farm | 6 F | 1:09.80 | $13,910 |
| 1962 | Smashing Gail | 4 | Robert Ussery | Nick Combest | Edith Baily Dent | 6 F | 1:11.00 | $14,918 |
| 1961 | Evening Glow | 4 | Howard Grant | Bert Mulholland | Jessie Sloane Widener | 6 F | 1:10.60 | $14,885 |
| 1960 | Mommy Dear | 4 | Manuel Ycaza | Eddie Hayward | Circle M. Farm | 6 F | 1:09.60 | $17,932 |
| 1959 | Tinkalero | 3 | Arthur Sherman | Jake B. Dodson | John J. Monaco | 6 F | 1:11.00 | $17,997 |
| 1958 | Searching | 6 | Ismael Valenzuela | Hirsch Jacobs | Ethel D. Jacobs | 6 F | 1:11.40 | $14,538 |
| 1957 | Little Pache | 4 | Conn McCreary | Frank E. Cundall | Ellis Farm (J. A. Boris & Max Litwin) | 6 F | 1:11.80 | $15,100 |
| 1956 | Searching | 4 | Conn McCreary | Hirsch Jacobs | Ethel D. Jacobs | 6 F | 1:11.60 | $15,300 |
| 1955-1 | Brazen Brat | 7 | Nick Shuk | J. Bowes Bond | Mrs. Samuel M. Pistorio | 6 F | 1:12.40 | $19,225 |
| 1955-2 | Snugger | 4 | Roger LeBlanc | James P. Conway | Ada L. Rice | 6 F | 1:12.20 | $19,475 |
| 1954-1 | Banta | 5 | Angel Valenzuela | Walter A. Kelley | Elmendorf Farm (Maxwell Gluck) | 6 F | 1:11.80 | $19,775 |
| 1954-2 | Good Call | 4 | Douglas Dodson | J. Carter | Fairway Farm (Harry J. O'Shea) | 6 F | 1:13.00 | $19,275 |
| 1953 | Parading Lady | 4 | Ovie Scurlock | John B. Theall | Joe W. Brown | 6 F | 1:11.80 | $21,000 |
| 1952 | Quiz Song | 4 | Willie Lester | Ike Perlstein | John Howard Clark | 6 F | 1:11.20 | $16,850 |
| 1951 | Growing Up | 4 | Ted Atkinson | Phil Bieber | Warbern Stable | 6 F | 1:11.40 | $12,550 |
| 1950 | Sweet Dream | 5 | Eddie Arcaro | Don Cameron | Havahome Stable (Joseph Rabinovitch) | 6 F | 1:11.20 | $12,700 |
| 1949 | Ocean Brief | 5 | Warren Mehrtens | Max Hirsch | King Ranch | 6 F | 1:11.80 | $12,025 |
| 1948 | Carolyn A. | 4 | Charles LeBlanc | James P. Conway | Ben F. Whitaker | 6 F | 1:13.20 | $14,825 |
| 1947 | Miss Kimo | 3 | Ovie Scurlock | William M. Booth | William G. Helis Sr. | 6 F | 1:12.00 | $12,450 |
| 1946 | Recce | 4 | Eddie Arcaro | Sylvester Veitch | Cornelius Vanderbilt Whitney | 6 F | 1:11.40 | $13,300 |
| 1945 | Monsoon | 3 | Eddie Arcaro | Sylvester Veitch | Cornelius Vanderbilt Whitney | 6 F | 1:11.40 | $7,600 |
| 1944 | Whirlabout | 3 | Herb Lindberg | George M. Odom | Louis B. Mayer | 6 F | 1:12.60 | $7,455 |
| 1943 | Farmerette | 3 | Thomas May | George M. Odom | Elsie Cassatt Stewart | 6 F | 1:12.40 | $6,125 |
| 1942 | Zaca Rose | 3 | James Stout | Frank J. Baker | William W. Crenshaw | 6 F | 1:12.60 | $6,625 |
| 1941 | Wise Niece | 3 | Albert Schmidl | John Hazza | Maplecrest Farm | 6 F | 1:12.00 | $6,375 |
| 1940 | Little Risk | 3 | George Woolf | Horace A. Jones | Calumet Farm | 6 F | 1:10.80 | $4,650 |
