= Vosburgh Stakes =

- Class: Grade III
- Location: Belmont Park; Elmont, New York, United States
- Inaugurated: 1940
- Race type: Thoroughbred – Flat racing
- Website: Belmont Park

Race information
- Distance: 7 furlongs
- Surface: Dirt
- Track: Left-handed
- Qualification: Three-year-olds & up
- Weight: Assigned
- Purse: $250,000 (2021)

The Vosburgh Stakes is an American thoroughbred horse race held annually at Belmont Park in Elmont, New York. Run at the end of September/early October, it is open to horses three-years-old and up of either gender. A Grade III sprint race, it is raced at a distance of seven furlongs and is a major prep to the Breeders' Cup Sprint.

First run in 1940, the Vosburgh Stakes is named in honor of Walter Vosburgh, a turf historian who was the official handicapper for The Jockey Club and various other racing associations from 1894 to 1934. The inaugural race, as well as the second running, was won by Herbert M. Woolf's colt Joe Schenck, named for the vaudeville star, Joseph Thuma Schenck.

The race was run at Aqueduct Race Track in 1959, 1961 to 1974, 1976, 1977, 1979, 1983, 1985, and 1986. It was raced over a distance of seven furlongs from inception until 2003 when it was run at 6.5 furlongs for that year only. Since 2004 it has been run at its current distance of six furlongs.

Prior to 1979, it was called the Vosburgh Handicap. Until 1958 it was open to all ages.

As of 2020 the race was downgraded to Group II.

== Records ==
Speed record:

- 1:08.02 @ 6 furlongs – Private Zone (2013)
- 1:20.20 @ 7 furlongs – Dr. Fager (1968)

Most wins:

- 2 – Joe Schenck (1940, 1941)
- 2 – Dr. Fager (1967, 1968)
- 2 – Sewickley (1989, 1990)
- 2 – Private Zone (2013, 2014)
- 2 – Imperial Hint (2018, 2019)

Most wins by a jockey:

- 6 – Ángel Cordero Jr. (1973, 1978, 1983, 1984, 1987, 1990)

Most wins by a trainer:

- 4 – Flint S. Schulhofer (1969, 1989, 1990, 1992)

Most wins by an owner:

- 4 – Tartan Stable (1967, 1968, 1969, 1978)

== Winners ==
Year	Winner	Age	Jockey	Trainer	Owner	Dist.	Time	Win $	Gr.
2026	T Kraft	4	Junior Alvarado	William I. Mott	LRE Racing	7 f	1:22.78	$137,500	G3
2025	Patriot Spirit	4	Javier Castellano	Michael B Campbell	George A Mellon	7 f	1:21.84	$250,000	G3
2024	Mufasa (CHI)	5	Irad Ortiz, Jr.	Ignacio Correas, IV	Saavedra, Carlos and Stud Vendaval, Inc.	7 f	1:22.51	$250,000	G3
2023	Cody's Wish	5	Junior Alvarado	William I. Mott	Godolphin	7 f	1:21.83	$250,000	G2
2022	Elite Power	4	Jose Lezcano	William I. Mott	Juddmonte Farm	7 f	1:23.98	$250,000	G2
2021	Following Sea	3	Joel Rosario	Todd A. Pletcher	Spendthrift Farm	6 f	1:09.20	$137,500	G2
2020	Firenze Fire	5	Jose Lezcano	Kelly J. Breen	Mr Amore Stable (Ron Lombardi)	6 f	1:09.74	$150,000	G2
2019	Imperial Hint	6	Javier Castellano	Luis Carvajal Jr.	Raymond Mamone	6 f	1:08.35	$192,500	G1
2018	Imperial Hint	5	Javier Castellano	Luis Carvajal Jr.	Raymond Mamone	6 f	1:08.27	$192,500	G1
2017	Takaful	3	José Ortiz	Kiaran McLaughlin	Shadwell Racing	6 f	1:09.69	$210,000	G1
2016	Joking	7	Manuel Franco	Charlton Baker	Charlton Baker	6 f	1:09.18	$210,000	G1
2015	Rock Fall	4	Javier Castellano	Todd A. Pletcher	Stonestreet Stables	6 f	1:08.70	$240,000	G1
2014	Private Zone	5	Martin Pedroza	Alfredo Velazquez	Good Friends Stable	6 f	1.08:95	$240,000	G1
2013	Private Zone	4	Martin Pedroza	Doug O'Neill	Good Friends Stable	6 f	1:08.02	$240,000	G1
2012	The Lumber Guy	3	John Velazquez	Michael Hushion	Barry K. Schwartz	6 f	1:09.72	$240,000	G1
2011	Giant Ryan	5	Cornelio Velásquez	Bisnath Parbhoo	Shivananda Parbhoo	6 f	1:09.10	$240,000	G1
2010	Girolamo	4	Alan Garcia	Saeed bin Suroor	Godolphin Racing	6 f	1:09.41	$240,000	G1
2009	Kodiak Kowboy	4	Shaun Bridgmohan	Steven M. Asmussen	Vinery Stables & Fox Hill Farm	6 f	1:10.08	$240,000	G1
2008	Black Seventeen	4	Clinton Potts	Brian Koriner	Wind River Stables	6 f	1:09.77	$240,000	G1
2007	Fabulous Strike	4	Ramon A. Dominguez	Todd M. Beattie	Walter Downey	6 f	1:09.22	$240,000	G1
2006	Henny Hughes	3	John R. Velazquez	Kiaran McLaughlin	Zabeel Racing (Mohammed bin Rashid Al Maktoum)	6 f	1:08.13	$240,000	G1
2005	Taste of Paradise	6	Garrett Gomez	Gary Mandella	David Bloom	6 f	1:08.82	$300,000	G1
2004	Pico Central	5	Victor Espinoza	Paulo Lobo	Gary A. Tanaka	6 f	1:09.74	$300,000	G1
2003	Ghostzapper	3	Javier Castellano	Robert J. Frankel	Stronach Stable	6.5 f	1:14.72	$300,000	G1
2002	Bonapaw	6	Gerard Melancon	Norman Miller III	James & Dennis Richard	6 f	1:22.34	$180,000	G1
2001	Left Bank	4	John R. Velazquez	Todd A. Pletcher	Michael Tabor	6 f	1:20.73	$180,000	G1
2000	Trippi	3	Jerry D. Bailey	Todd A. Pletcher	Dogwood Stable	6 f	1:21.66	$180,000	G1
1999	Artax	4	Jorge F. Chavez	Louis Albertrani	Paraneck Stable	7 f	1:21.60	$150,000	G1
1998	Affirmed Success	4	Jorge F. Chavez	Richard Schosberg	Albert Fried Jr.	7 f	1:21.99	$150,000	G1
1997	Victor Cooley	4	Jorge F. Chavez	Mark Frostad	Jeff Begg	7 f	1:22.00	$150,000	G1
1996	Langfuhr	4	Jorge F. Chavez	Mike Keogh	Gus Schickedanz	7 f	1:21.20	$120,000	G1
1995	Not Surprising	5	Robbie Davis	Judson Van Worp	Robert Van Worp	7 f	1:22.48	$120,000	G1
1994	Harlan	5	Jerry D. Bailey	D. Wayne Lukas	Arthur B. Hancock III	7 f	1:21.82	$120,000	G1
1993	Birdonthewire	4	Mike E. Smith	Philip M. Serpe	Robert Kaufman	7 f	1:22.28	$120,000	G1
1992	Rubiano	5	Julie Krone	Flint S. Schulhofer	Centennial Farm	7 f	1:22.80	$120,000	G1
1991	Housebuster	4	Craig Perret	Warren A. Croll Jr.	Robert P. Levy	7 f	1:21.85	$120,000	G1
1990	Sewickley	5	Ángel Cordero Jr.	Flint S. Schulhofer	Robert S. Evans	7 f	1:21.00	$142,080	
1989	Sewickley	4	Randy Romero	Flint S. Schulhofer	Robert S. Evans	7 f	1:23.00	$135,120	
1988	Mining	4	Randy Romero	C. R. McGaughey III	Ogden Mills Phipps	7 f	1:22.40	$133,920	
1987	Groovy	4	Ángel Cordero Jr.	Jose A. Martin	Prestonwood Farm	7 f	1:22.60	$139,680	
1986	King's Swan	6	José A. Santos	Richard E. Dutrow Sr.	Alvin Akman	7 f	1:21.80	$141,840	
1985	Another Reef	3	Nick Santagata	Jack Ludwig	Thomas K. Leachman	7 f	1:21.80	$102,420	
1984	Track Barron	3	Ángel Cordero Jr.	LeRoy Jolley	Peter M. Brant	7 f	1:22.00	$109,800	
1983	A Phenomenon	3	Ángel Cordero Jr.	Angel Penna Jr.	Leslie Combs II	7 f	1:21.00	$69,000	
1982	Engine One	4	Ruben Hernandez	Sylvester Veitch	Benjamin F. Ferguson II	7 f	1:23.80	$65,760	
1981	Guilty Conscience	5	Cash Asmussen	Hubert Hine	Mrs. Richard Davison	7 f	1:22.00	$67,921	
1980	Plugged Nickle	3	Cash Asmussen	Thomas J. Kelly	John M. Schiff	7 f	1:21.40	$67,440	
1979	General Assembly	3	Jacinto Vásquez	LeRoy Jolley	Bertram R. Firestone	7 f	1:21.00	$48,195	
1978	Dr. Patches	4	Ángel Cordero Jr.	John A. Nerud	Tartan Stable	7 f	1:21.00	$48,960	
1977	Affiliate	3	Craig Perret	Lazaro S. Barrera	Harbor View Farm	7 f	1:21.00	$49,905	
1976	My Juliet	4	Anthony Black	Eugene Euster	George Weasel Jr.	7 f	1:21.80	$31,980	
1975	No Bias	5	Angel Santiago	Harold Hodosh	Harold Hodosh	7 f	1:22.80	$34,590	
1974	Forego	4	Heliodoro Gustines	Sherrill W. Ward	Lazy F Ranch	7 f	1:21.60	$35,550	
1973	Aljamin	3	Ángel Cordero Jr.	Lazaro S. Barrera	Raul Cano	7 f	1:21.20	$33,660	
1972	Triple Bend	4	Laffit Pincay Jr.	William J. Hirsch	Frank M. McMahon	7 f	1:22.00	$35,310	
1971	Duck Dance	4	John Ruane	H. Allen Jerkens	Hobeau Farm	7 f	1:21.20	$36,660	
1970	Best Turn	4	Larry Adams	Reggie Cornell	Calumet Farm	7 f	1:21.40	$38,545	
1969	Ta Wee	3	John L. Rotz	Flint S. Schulhofer	Tartan Stable	7 f	1:21.60	$38,220	
1968	Dr. Fager	4	Braulio Baeza	John A. Nerud	Tartan Stable	7 f	1:20.20	$37,050	
1967	Dr. Fager	3	Braulio Baeza	John A. Nerud	Tartan Stable	7 f	1:21.60	$37,310	
1966	Gallant Romeo	5	Kenny Knapp	Willard Proctor	J. Graham Brown	7 f	1:22.80	$37,505	
1965	R. Thomas	4	Larry Adams	Dave Erb	Roger W. Wilson	7 f	1:23.00	$39,325	
1964	Affectionately	4	Howard Grant	Hirsch Jacobs	Ethel D. Jacobs	7 f	1:22.00	$18,623	
1963	Ornamento	3	Braulio Baeza	James P. Conway	Darby Dan Farm	7 f	1:23.80	$15,275	
1962	Commend	4	Terry Bove	H. Allen Jerkens	David Shaer	7 f	1:22.20	$15,762	
1961	Gyro	4	Braulio Baeza	John Lipari	Jagma Stable	7 f	1:23.20	$14,950	
1960	Mail Order	4	Eldon Nelson	Larry H. Thompson	Alamode Farm (Modie Spiegel)	7 f	1:22.60	$19,330	
1959	Rick City	3	Robert L. Stevenson	Joe Carroll	Clermont Stable	7 f	1:22.80	$18,550	
1958	Tick Tock	5	Bill Shoemaker	Edward A. Christmas	Howell E. Jackson	7 f	1:23.00	$15,187	
1957	Bold Ruler	3	Eddie Arcaro	James E. Fitzsimmons	Wheatley Stable	7 f	1:21.40	$16,000	
1956	Summer Tan	4	Eric Guerin	Sherrill W. Ward	Mrs. John W. Galbreath	7 f	1:23.60	$17,200	
1955	Nance's Lad	3	Hedley Woodhouse	Hilton Dabson	Hilton Dabson	7 f	1:24.00	$16,650	
1954	Joe Jones	4	Conn McCreary	Hirsch Jacobs	Ethel D. Jacobs	7 f	1:23.80	$17,800	
1953	Indian Land	4	Ted Atkinson	Bill Winfrey	Alfred G. Vanderbilt II	7 f	1:23.60	$17,200	
1952	Parading Lady	3	James Hardinbrook	John B. Theall	Joe W. Brown	7 f	1:23.80	$16,150	
1951	War King *	4	Conn McCreary	Preston M. Burch	Brookmeade Stable	7 f	1:23.20	$13,125	
1950	Tea Maker	7	Jack Robertson	J. Dallet Byers	Florence L. Clark	7 f	1:23.00	$13,150	
1949	Loser Weeper	4	Eric Guerin	Bill Winfrey	Alfred G. Vanderbilt II	7 f	1:23.00	$12,750	
1948	Colosal	5	Ovie Scurlock	Ivan H. Parke	Fred W. Hooper	7 f	1:23.80	$22,300	
1947	With Pleasure	4	Jack Westrope	Thomas P. Fleming	Oscar E. Breault	7 f	1:23.80	$19,900	
1946	Coincidence	4	Ted Atkinson	John M. Gaver Sr.	Greentree Stable	7 f	1:23.80	$13,950	
1945	Buzfuz	3	Tommy Luther	Joseph B. Rosen	Sunshine Stable	7 f	1:23.20	$7,765	
1944	Cassis (DH)	5	Ted Atkinson	Preston M. Burch	Howe Stable	7 f	1:23.40	$4,762	
1944	Paperboy (DH)	6	Warren Mehrtens	Jimmy Coleman	W-L Ranch Co.	7 f	1:23.40	$4,762	
1943	Wait A Bit	4	Charles Givens	Matthew P. Brady	William Ziegler Jr.	7 f	1:23.20	$6,600	
1942	Parasang	5	Don Meade	Edward L. Snyder	C. V. Whitney	7 f	1:23.00	$6,375	
1941	Joe Schenck	6	Wendell Eads	Ross O. Higdon	Woolford Farm	7 f	1:24.20	$4,500	
1940	Joe Schenck	5	Robert Vedder	Ross O. Higdon	Woolford Farm	7 f	1:23.20	$4,400	

- *In 1951 Miche finished first, but was disqualified.
