= Top Flight Stakes =

- Class: Listed
- Location: Aqueduct Racetrack; Queens, New York, United States
- Inaugurated: 1940
- Race type: Thoroughbred – Flat racing
- Website: NYRA

Race information
- Distance: 1-1/8 miles
- Surface: Dirt
- Track: left-handed
- Qualification: Fillies & Mares, 4-years-old & up
- Weight: 123 lbs. with allowances
- Purse: $150,000 (2025)

The Top Flight Stakes is an American Thoroughbred horse race run annually at Aqueduct Racetrack in Queens, New York. A Listed race, it is open to fillies and mares, age three and older. The event is contested over a distance of one and one-eighth miles on dirt and currently offers a purse of $150,000.

The Top Flight Handicap was run at Belmont Park prior to 1961 and again in 1993.

The race is named for Top Flight, ranked in the Blood-Horse magazine List of the Top 100 Racehorses of the 20th Century at #66. Top Flight was never beaten by a member of her own sex.

== Historical note ==
Poker Night, the lone three-year-old in a field of seven, won the 1973 race by four lengths and bettered the stakes record time stakes two‐fifths of a second while running on a wet track officially rated only as good.

== Records ==
Speed record: (at current distance of 1 mile)

- 1:48.20 @ 1-1/8 miles: Poker Night (1973)
- 1:41.80 @ 1-1/16 miles: Parlo (1955)
- 1:34.96 @ 1 mile: Educated Risk (1994)

Most wins:

- 2 - Amerigo Lady (1968, 1969)
- 2 - Shuvee (1970, 1971)

Most wins by a jockey:

- 6 - Jerry Bailey (1990, 1993, 2000, 2002, 2004, 2005)

Most wins by a trainer:

- 6 - Todd A. Pletcher (2007, 2008, 2014 ,2019, 2023, 2024)

Most wins by an owner:

- 3 - Ethel D. Jacobs (1956, 1965, 1967)
- 3 - Rokeby Stable (1968, 1969, 1993)

== Winners ==
Year	Winner	Age	Jockey	Trainer	Owner	Dist. (Miles)	Time	Win $	Grade
2025	Headline Numbers	4	Dylan Davis	Chad C. Brown	Klaravich Stables	1-1/8 m	1:51.20	$82,500	Listed
2024	Tizzy in the Sky	5	Kendrick Carmouche	Todd A. Pletcher	KimDon Racing	1-1/8 m	1:49.56	$82,500	Listed
2023	Falconet	4	Jose Lezcano	Todd A. Pletcher	China Horse Club & WinStar Farm	1-1/8 m	1:51.42	$55,000	Listed
2022	Exotic West	4	Javier Castellano	Gary Sciacca	Louis Lazzinnaro	1-1/8 m	1:50.13	$55,000	Listed
2021	Horologist	5	Junior Alvarado	William I. Mott	There's a Chance Stable, Medallion Racing, Abbondanza Racing, Parkland Thoroughbreds, Paradise Farm Corp. & David Staudacher	1-1/8 m	1:52.14	$55,000	Listed
2020	Race not held due to COVID-19								
2019	Another Broad	4	Manuel Franco	Todd A. Pletcher	Madaket Stables LLC, Elayne Stables, Brian Martin	1-1/8 m	1:52.99	$110,000	Listed
2018	Blue Prize	4	José Ortiz	Ignacio Correas IV	Merriebelle Stable	1-1/8 m	1:51.48	$120,000	Listed
2017	Mo' Green	4	Irad Ortiz Jr.	John Servis	Leonard C. Green	1-1/8 m	1:51.79	$120,000	G3
2016	Carrumba	4	José Ortiz	Claude R. McGaughey III	Phipps Stable	1-1/8 m	1:50.26	$120,000	G3
2015	House Rules	4	Junior Alvarado	James A. Jerkens	Joseph V. Shields Jr.	1-1/8 m	1:52.41	$120,000	G3
2014	Teen Pauline	4	Irad Ortiz Jr.	Todd A. Pletcher	Stonestreet Stables	1-1/16 m	1:45.04	$120,000	G2
2013	Summer Applause	4	John R. Velazquez	Chad C. Brown	Gillian S.Campbell, Greenwood Lodge Farm, Dan Clark, Greg Skoda	1-1/16 m	1:44.10	$120,000	G2
2012	It's Tricky	4	Ramon Domínguez	Kiaran McLaughlin	Godolphin Racing	1-1/16 m	1:45.30	$90,000	G2
2011	Race not held								
2010	Spacy Tracy	5	Jeremy Rose	Anthony W. Dutrow	Mercedes Stable	1 m	1:35.28	$90,000	G2
2008	Leah's Secret	5	Eibar Coa	Todd A. Pletcher	WinStar Farm	1 m	1:36.40	$90,000	G2
2007	Mini Sermon	3	Eibar Coa	Todd A. Pletcher	Edward P. Evans	1 m	1:37.29	$90,000	G2
2006	Rahy's Appeal	4	Alan Garcia	James K. Chapman	John & Martha Mullholland	1 m	1:36.15	$90,000	G2
2005	Stellar Jayne	4	Jerry Bailey	Saeed bin Suroor	Godolphin Racing	1 m	1:35.94	$90,000	G2
2004	Daydreaming	3	Jerry Bailey	Claude R. McGaughey III	Ogden Mills Phipps	1 m	1:35.29	$90,000	G2
2003	Randaroo	3	Heberto Castillo Jr.	Kiaran McLaughlin	H. Joseph Allen	1 m	1:36.49	$90,000	G2
2002	Sightseek	3	Jerry Bailey	Robert J. Frankel	Juddmonte Farms	1 m	1:35.46	$90,000	G2
2001	Cat Cay	4	John R. Velazquez	Claude R. McGaughey III	Ogden Phipps	1 m	1:35.45	$90,000	G2
2000	Reciclada	5	Jerry Bailey	Richard Mandella	Diamond A Stable	1 m	1:35.54	$90,000	G2
1999	Belle Cherie	3	John R. Velazquez	Philip G. Johnson	Belle Meadows Farm	1 m	1:35.46	$90,000	G2
1998	Catinca	3	Richard Migliore	John C. Kimmel	Robert K. Waxman	1 m	1:35.81	$90,000	G2
1997	Dixie Flag	3	Mike Luzzi	H. Allen Jerkens	Bohemia Stable	1 m	1:35.34	$90,000	G2
1996	Flat Fleet Feet	3	Mike E. Smith	John C. Kimmel	Caesar P. Kimmel & Phillip J. & L. I. Solondz	1 m	1:37.00	$90,000	G1
1995	Twist Afleet	4	Mike E. Smith	John C. Kimmel	Lucille Conover	1 m	1:35.26	$90,000	G1
1994	Educated Risk	4	Mike E. Smith	Claude R. McGaughey III	Ogden Mills Phipps	1 m	1:34.96	$90,000	G1
1993	You'd Be Surprised	4	Jerry Bailey	MacKenzie Miller	Rokeby Stable	1-1/8 m	1:48.82	$90,000	G1
1992	Firm Stance	4	Pat Day	Mitch Shirota	Gainesway Stable	1-1/8 m	1:50.55	$120,000	G1
1991	Buy the Firm	5	Julie Krone	Carlos F. Martin	Morven Stud Farms	1-1/8 m	1:52.20	$120,000	G1
1990	Dreamy Mimi	4	Jerry Bailey	George R. Arnold II	Alex G. Campbell Jr.	1-1/8 m	1:50.40	$136,800	G1
1989	Banker's Lady	4	Ángel Cordero Jr.	Philip M. Hauswald	Edward A. Cox Jr.	1-1/8 m	1:51.20	$133,680	G1
1988	Clabber Girl	4	José A. Santos	D. Wayne Lukas	John A. Nerud	1-1/8 m	1:49.40	$141,840	G1
1987	Ms. Eloise	4	Robbie Davis	Philip G. Johnson	Margaret Grimm	1-1/8 m	1:50.20	$138,480	G1
1986	Ride Sally	4	Walter Guerra	Nick Zito	Manhasset Stable	1-1/8 m	1:49.20	$134,640	G1
1985	Flip's Pleasure	5	Jean-Luc Samyn	H. Allen Jerkens	Hobeau Farm	1-1/8 m	1:51.00	$101,160	G1
1984	Sweet Missus	4	Robert Thibeau	Michael C. Sedlacek	Glenn E. Lane	1-1/8 m	1:50.20	$104,040	G1
1983	Adept	4	Karen Rogers	Frank I. Wright	Nelson Bunker Hunt	1-1/8 m	1:50.00	$65,160	G1
1982	Andover Way	4	Jorge Velásquez	Howard M. Tesher	H. Joseph Allen	1-1/8 m	1:50.00	$66,360	G1
1981	Chain Bracelet	4	Ruben Hernandez	James W. Maloney	Shirley H. Taylor	1-1/8 m	1:49.60	$64,680	G1
1980	Glorious Song	4	Jorge Velásquez	Gerry Belanger	Nelson Bunker Hunt	1-1/8 m	1:49.60	$66,360	G1
1979	Waya	5	Ángel Cordero Jr.	David A. Whiteley	Peter M. Brant	1-1/8 m	1:50.80	$64,680	G1
1978	Northernette	4	Jeffrey Fell	David A. Whiteley	Peter M. Brant	1-1/8 m	1:49.40	$48,330	G1
1977	Shawi	4	Michael Venezia	Jose A. Martin	Mrs. Randolph Weinsier	1-1/8 m	1:49.80	$48,285	G1
1976	Proud Delta	4	Jorge Velásquez	Peter M. Howe	Montpelier	1-1/8 m	1:49.00	$49,455	G1
1975	Twixt	6	William Passmore	Katherine M. Voss	Mrs. John M. Franklin	1-1/8 m	1:50.60	$33,240	G1
1974	Lady Love	4	Eddie Maple	Frank Catrone	Ada L. Rice	1-1/8 m	1:48.60	$33,120	G1
1973	Poker Night	3	Robert Woodhouse	H. Allen Jerkens	Hobeau Farm	1-1/8 m	1:48.20	$33,420	G1
1972	Inca Queen	4	Garth Patterson	George T. Poole	Cornelius V. Whitney	1-1/8 m	1:50.00	$33,900	
1971	Shuvee	5	Ron Turcotte	Willard C. Freeman	Anne Minor Stone	1-1/8 m	1:49.60	$32,340	
1970	Shuvee	4	Braulio Baeza	Willard C. Freeman	Anne Minor Stone	1-1/8 m	1:48.60	$37,375	
1969	Amerigo Lady	5	Manuel Ycaza	J. Elliott Burch	Rokeby Stable	1-1/8 m	1:50.40	$35,620	
1968	Amerigo Lady	4	Jorge Velásquez	J. Elliott Burch	Rokeby Stable	1-1/8 m	1:49.00	$37,830	
1967	Straight Deal	5	Ángel Cordero Jr.	Hirsch Jacobs	Ethel D. Jacobs	1-1/8 m	1:49.60	$36,075	
1966	Summer Scandal	4	Garth Patterson	Woods Garth	Harborvale Stable (David O. Volkert)	1-1/8 m	1:49.40	$35,945	
1965	Affectionately	5	Walter Blum	Hirsch Jacobs	Ethel D. Jacobs	1-1/8 m	1:49.80	$37,180	
1964	Oil Royalty	6	Howard Grant	Charles Whittingham	John R. Gaines	1-1/8 m	1:50.80	$37,180	
1963	Firm Policy	4	Manuel Ycaza	E. Barry Ryan	E. Barry Ryan	1-1/8 m	1:48.60	$35,800	
1962	Pepper Patch	5	Donald Pierce	Sol Rutchick	Nicholas A. Martini	1-1/8 m	1:50.20	$37,050	
1961	Make Sail	4	Manuel Ycaza	Woody Stephens	Cain Hoy Stable	1-1/8 m	1:51.00	$35,945	
1960	Royal Native	4	Bill Hartack	Peter F. Gacicia	William B. MacDonald Jr.	1-1/16 m	1:43.00	$36,385	
1959	Big Effort	4	Bill Shoemaker	J. Elliott Burch	Brookmeade Stable	1-1/16 m	1:42.80	$17,575	
1958	Plucky Roman	4	Howard Grant	Clyde Troutt	Ada L. Rice	1-1/16 m	1:43.00	$17,672	
1957	Plotter	4	Pete D. Anderson	William Post	Harry La Montagne	1-1/16 m	1:42.60	$19,950	
1956	Searching	4	Conn McCreary	Hirsch Jacobs	Ethel D. Jacobs	1-1/16 m	1:42.80	$19,400	
1955	Parlo	4	Eric Guerin	Richard Handlen	Foxcatcher Farm	1-1/16 m	1:41.80	$21,700	
1954	Sunshine Nell	6	Eddie Arcaro	Robert Green	Meyer J. Kaplan	1-1/16 m	1:43.40	$24,750	
1953	Marta	6	Conn McCreary	Woody Stephens	Woodvale Farm	1-1/16 m	1:42.80	$22,350	
1952	Renew	5	William Boland	Max Hirsch	King Ranch	1-1/16 m	1:43.80	$16,850	
1951	Busanda	4	Eric Guerin	Bartholomew Sweeny	Ogden Phipps	1-1/16 m	1:42.40	$12,650	
1950	Nell K.	4	George Hettinger	John B. Partridge	Spring Hill Farm	1-1/16 m	1:43.80	$12,200	
1949	But Why Not	5	Dave Gorman	Max Hirsch	King Ranch	1-1/16 m	1:43.60	$11,450	
1948	Honeymoon	5	Douglas Dodson	Wayne Stucki	W-L Ranch Co.	1-1/16 m	1:43.60	$16,950	
1947	Rytina	4	Ted Atkinson	George P. "Maj" Odom	Carol Averell Harriman Stewart	1-1/16 m	1:43.60	$18,550	
1946	Sicily	4	Eddie Arcaro	William Post	Harry La Montagne	1-1/16 m	1:43.20	$17,400	
1945	Miss Keeneland	4	Albert Snider	Ben A. Jones	Calumet Farm	1-1/16 m	1:45.00	$7,585	
1944	Boojiana	3	Ted Atkinson	Andy Schuttinger	C. V. Whitney	1-1/16 m	1:43.40	$8,165	
1943	Mar-Kell	4	Bill Thompson	Ben A. Jones	Calumet Farm	1-1/16 m	1:44.80	$4,700	
1942	Level Best	4	Don Meade	John Porter Jones	Crispin Oglebay	1-1/16 m	1:42.80	$5,325	
1941	Tangled	3	Conn McCreary	John M. Gaver Sr.	Greentree Stable	1-1/16 m	1:44.60	$4,800	
1940	True Call	3	Don Meade	Dion K. Kerr	Mrs. Dion K. Kerr	1-1/16 m	1:43.60	$6,200	
