= Vagrancy Stakes =

- Class: Grade III
- Location: Belmont Park; Elmont, New York, United States
- Inaugurated: 1948 (as Vagrancy Handicap)
- Race type: Thoroughbred – Flat racing
- Website: NYRA

Race information
- Distance: 6 1/2 furlongs.
- Surface: Dirt
- Track: Left-handed
- Qualification: Fillies & Mares, four-years-old & up
- Weight: 124 lbs. with allowances
- Purse: $175,000 (2023)

The Vagrancy Stakes is a Grade III American Thoroughbred horse race for fillies and mares that are four years old and older run over a distance of 6 1/2 furlongs on the dirt track held annually in late May or early June at Belmont Park in Elmont, New York.

== History ==
The race is named in honor of Vagrancy, the Champion three-year-old filly and champion handicap mare of 1942 owned by Belair Stud and trained by Sunny Jim Fitzsimmons.

The event was inaugurated on 10 July 1948 at Aqueduct Racetrack in Queens, New York when Conniver easily won by five lengths over Harmonica in a time of 1:43 3/5 over a distance of 1 1/16 miles. Later that year Conniver was voted the 1948 American Champion Older Female Horse.

The event was idle from 1949 through 1951.

It was hosted by the Aqueduct track from inception through 1955 and again in 1960, 1963–1967, 1975, and 1977–1986. Over the years it has been contested at various distances: 1 1/16 miles in 1948 and 1952, 7 furlongs between 1953–1997 and 6 1/2 furlongs from 1998 to today.

In 1955, the Vagrancy Handicap was run in two divisions.

Between 1954 and 1960 the event was held in late summer.

The event was classified as a Grade III in 1973 and was upgraded to Grade II in 2002. This race was downgraded to a Grade III for its 2014 running.

In 2023 the conditions of the event were change from a handicap to a stakes allowance. Hence, the name of the event was changed to Vagrancy Stakes.

== Records ==
Speed record:

- 6 1/2 furlongs: 1:14.46 – Bear Fan (2004)
- 7 furlongs: 1:20.80 – Grecian Flight (1988)

Margins:

- 9 lengths – Bear Fan (2004)

Most wins:

- 2 – Sky Beauty (1994, 1995)
- 2 – Victim of Love (2020, 2021)

Most wins by a jockey:

- 6 – John Velazquez (1999, 2001, 2004, 2005, 2018, 2026)

Most wins by a trainer:

- 5 – H. Allen Jerkens (1968, 1969, 1989, 1994, 1995)

Most wins by an owner:

- 2 – Harry La Montagne (1948, 1957)
- 2 – Ethel D. Jacobs (1955, 1965)
- 2 – Calumet Farm (1956, 1961)
- 2 – Meadow Stable (1955, 1963)
- 2 – Wheatley Stable (1964, 1966)
- 2 – Hobeau Farm (1968, 1969)
- 2 – Eugene V. Klein (1986, 1987)
- 2 – Georgia E. Hofmann (1994, 1995)
- 2 – Tommy Town Thoroughbred (2020, 2021)
- 2 – Miller Racing (2025, 2026)

== Winners ==
| Year | Winner | Age | Jockey | Trainer | Owner | Distance | Time | Purse | Grade | Ref |
|---|---|---|---|---|---|---|---|---|---|---|
At Aqueduct - Vagrancy Stakes
| 2026 | Grammy Girl | 5 | Javier Castellano | Saffie A. Joseph Jr. | Red Storm Stable, Miller Racing & Flower Power Stables | 6 1/2 furlongs | 1:16.64 | $175,000 | III | |
| 2025 | Haulin Ice | 4 | John R. Velazquez | Saffie A. Joesph Jr. | C Two Racing Stable, Paul Braverman, Miller Racing & Timothy Pinch | 6 1/2 furlongs | 1:16.10 | $175,000 | III | |
| 2024 | Leave No Trace | 4 | Jose Lezcano | Phillip M. Serpe | WellSpring Stables | 6 1/2 furlongs | 1:15.91 | $175,000 | III | |
At Belmont Park
| 2023 | Caramel Swirl | 5 | Junior Alvarado | William I. Mott | Godolphin | 6 1/2 furlongs | 1:16.98 | $175,000 | III | |
Vagrancy Handicap
| 2022 | Bella Sofia | 4 | Luis Saez | Rudy R. Rodriguez | Sofia Soares, Michael Imperio, Vincent S. Scuderi, Matthew Mercurio, & Parkland Thoroughbreds | 6 1/2 furlongs | 1:16.02 | $145,500 | III | |
| 2021 | Victim of Love | 5 | Joel Rosario | Todd Beattie | Tommy Town Thoroughbred | 6 1/2 furlongs | 1:17.27 | $145,500 | III | |
| 2020 | Victim of Love | 4 | Jose Lezcano | Todd Beattie | Tommy Town Thoroughbred | 6 1/2 furlongs | 1:16.27 | $100,000 | III | |
| 2019 | Heavenhasmynikki | 5 | Kendrick Carmouche | Robert B. Hess Jr. | Ron Paolucci Racing | 6 1/2 furlongs | 1:17.44 | $194,000 | III | |
| 2018 | Kirby's Penny | 5 | John R. Velazquez | Wesley A. Ward | Kent Spellman | 6 1/2 furlongs | 1:17.44 | $200,000 | III | |
| 2017 | By the Moon | 5 | Rajiv Maragh | Michelle Nevin | Jay Em Ess Stable | 6 1/2 furlongs | 1:17.44 | $200,000 | III | |
| 2016 | Paulassilverlining | 4 | José L. Ortiz | Michelle Nevin | Vincent S. Scuderi | 6 1/2 furlongs | 1:15.82 | $147,000 | III | |
| 2015 | La Verdad | 5 | José L. Ortiz | Linda L. Rice | Lady Sheila Stable | 6 1/2 furlongs | 1:16.17 | $147,000 | III | |
| 2014 | Merry Meadow | 4 | Rajiv Maragh | Mark A. Hennig | William Parsons Jr. & David Howe | 6 1/2 furlongs | 1:17.36 | $150,000 | III | |
| 2013 | Glorious View | 4 | Junior Alvarado | William I. Mott | Laue Ranch | 6 1/2 furlongs | 1:15.96 | $200,000 | II | |
| 2012 | § C C's Pal | 5 | Junior Alvarado | Richard E. Dutrow Jr. | Eric Fein | 6 1/2 furlongs | 1:16.10 | $200,000 | II | |
| 2011 | Hilda's Passion | 4 | Javier Castellano | Todd A. Pletcher | Starlight Racing | 6 1/2 furlongs | 1:14.81 | $147,000 | II | |
| 2010 | Hour Glass | 4 | David Cohen | Todd A. Pletcher | Mill House Stable | 6 1/2 furlongs | 1:16.80 | $140,000 | II | |
| 2009 | Carolyn's Cat | 4 | Alan Garcia | Kiaran P. McLaughlin | Mr. & Mrs. William K. Warren | 6 1/2 furlongs | 1:16.34 | $147,000 | II | |
| 2008 | Looky Yonder | 4 | Garrett K. Gomez | Richard E. Dutrow Jr. | Lansdon B. Robbins III | 6 1/2 furlongs | 1:17.63 | $147,000 | II | |
| 2007 | Indian Flare | 5 | Javier Castellano | Robert J. Frankel | Juddmonte Farms | 6 1/2 furlongs | 1:16.44 | $150,000 | II | |
| 2006 | Dubai Escapade | 4 | Edgar S. Prado | Eoin G. Harty | Darley Stable | 6 1/2 furlongs | 1:15.39 | $150,000 | II | |
| 2005 | Sensibly Chic | 5 | John R. Velazquez | Timothy J. Tullock Jr. | Lois S. Nervitt | 6 1/2 furlongs | 1:16.31 | $150,000 | II | |
| 2004 | Bear Fan | 5 | John R. Velazquez | Wesley A. Ward | Peter Fan & W. Ward | 6 1/2 furlongs | 1:14.46 | $150,000 | II | |
| 2003 | Shawklit Mint | 4 | Richard Migliore | Patrick L. Reynolds | Flatbird Stable | 6 1/2 furlongs | 1:15.38 | $136,500 | II | |
| 2002 | Xtra Heat | 4 | Harry Vega | John E. Salzman Sr. | Harry Deitchman, Kenneth Taylor, John E. Salzman Sr. & John E. Salzman Jr. | 6 1/2 furlongs | 1:16.44 | $150,000 | II | |
| 2001 | Dat You Miz Blue | 4 | John R. Velazquez | James A. Jerkens | Cynthia Knight | 6 1/2 furlongs | 1:15.32 | $106,800 | III | |
| 2000 | Country Hideaway | 4 | Jerry D. Bailey | Claude R. McGaughey III | Ogden Phipps | 6 1/2 furlongs | 1:17.05 | $109,400 | III | |
| 1999 | † Gold Princess | 4 | John R. Velazquez | Gary Sciacca | Windbound Farms | 6 1/2 furlongs | 1:16.57 | $106,400 | III | |
| 1998 | Chip | 5 | Joe Bravo | Sonny Hine | Carolyn Hine | 6 1/2 furlongs | 1:15.69 | $81,575 | III | |
At Aqueduct
| 1997 | Inquisitive Look | 4 | Jorge F. Chavez | Richard L. Stoklosa | Robert Kaufman | 7 furlongs | 1:22.07 | $108,000 | III | |
At Belmont Park
| 1996 | Twist Afleet | 5 | Julie Krone | John C. Kimmel | Lucille Conover | 7 furlongs | 1:20.94 | $112,931 | III | |
| 1995 | Sky Beauty | 5 | Mike E. Smith | H. Allen Jerkens | Georgia E. Hofmann | 7 furlongs | 1:21.56 | $77,382 | III | |
| 1994 | Sky Beauty | 4 | Mike E. Smith | H. Allen Jerkens | Georgia E. Hofmann | 7 furlongs | 1:21.67 | $81,426 | III | |
| 1993 | Spinning Round | 4 | Jorge F. Chavez | Carl J. Domino | Kinsman Stable | 7 furlongs | 1:24.52 | $87,900 | III | |
| 1992 | Nannerl | 5 | José A. Santos | Flint S. Schulhofer | Marablue Farm | 7 furlongs | 1:22.55 | $85,350 | III | |
| 1991 | Queena | 5 | Mike E. Smith | Claude R. McGaughey III | Emory A. Hamilton | 7 furlongs | 1:22.00 | $91,800 | III | |
| 1990 | Mistaurian | 4 | Herb McCauley | Stephen A. DiMauro | Bernard Chaus | 7 furlongs | 1:25.20 | $83,400 | III | |
| 1989 | Aptostar | 4 | Ángel Cordero Jr. | H. Allen Jerkens | Centennial Farms | 7 furlongs | 1:22.80 | $85,950 | III | |
| 1988 | Grecian Flight | 4 | Craig Perret | Joseph H. Pierce Jr. | Henry Lindh | 7 furlongs | 1:20.80 | $87,900 | III | |
| 1987 | North Sider | 5 | Ángel Cordero Jr. | D. Wayne Lukas | Eugene V. Klein | 7 furlongs | 1:24.20 | $84,900 | III | |
At Aqueduct
| 1986 | Le Slew | 4 | José A. Santos | D. Wayne Lukas | Eugene V. Klein | 7 furlongs | 1:23.80 | $91,050 | III | |
| 1985 | Nany | 5 | Jorge Velásquez | Richard R. Root | Harry Mangurian Jr. | 7 furlongs | 1:23.80 | $86,700 | III | |
| 1984 | Grateful Friend | 4 | Ángel Cordero Jr. | Frank Martin Sr. | Harbor View Farm | 7 furlongs | 1:24.00 | $87,450 | III | |
| 1983 | Broom Dance | 4 | Gregg McCarron | James W. Maloney Jr. | Christiana Stables | 7 furlongs | 1:22.80 | $55,800 | III | |
| 1982 | Westport Native | 4 | Jorge Velásquez | Howard M. Tesher | Oak Cliff Stable | 7 furlongs | 1:22.60 | $54,300 | III | |
| 1981 | Island Charm | 4 | Richard Migliore | Stephen A. DiMauro | David McKibbin | 7 furlongs | 1:23.60 | $54,200 | III | |
| 1980 | Lady Lonsdale | 5 | Larry Saumell | Vincent R. Nocella | Pic Stable | 7 furlongs | 1:24.40 | $54,200 | III | |
| 1979 | Frosty Skater | 4 | Donald MacBeth | Lawrence W. Jennings Jr. | Arthur I. Appleton | 7 furlongs | 1:23.20 | $55,400 | III | |
| 1978 | Dainty Dotsie | 4 | Billy Phelps | James R. Cowden Jr. | James R. Cowden Sr. | 7 furlongs | 1:21.80 | $53,600 | III | |
| 1977 | Shy Dawn | 6 | Ángel Cordero Jr. | Woodrow M. Sedlacek | Jacques Wimpfheimer | 7 furlongs | 1:23.80 | $52,650 | III | |
At Belmont Park
| 1976 | My Juliet | 4 | Jorge Velásquez | Eugene H. Euster | George Weasel Jr. | 7 furlongs | 1:22.00 | $54,650 | III | |
At Aqueduct
| 1975 | Honorable Miss | 5 | Jacinto Vásquez | Frank Y. Whiteley Jr. | Pen-Y-Bryn Farm | 7 furlongs | 1:22.20 | $56,800 | III | |
At Belmont Park
| 1974 | Coraggioso | 4 | Don Brumfield | Anthony L. Basile | Bwamazon Farm | 7 furlongs | 1:22.40 | $59,900 | III | |
| 1973 | Krislin | 4 | Marco Castaneda | Stephen A. DiMauro | Harold Snyder | 7 furlongs | 1:22.60 | $28,075 | | |
| 1972 | Chou Croute | 4 | Robert Kotenko | Robert G. Dunham | E. V. Benjamin III | 7 furlongs | 1:22.40 | $29,150 | | |
| 1971 | Golden Or | 5 | John L. Rotz | Budd Lepman | Crown Stable | 7 furlongs | 1:23.00 | $32,900 | | |
| 1970 | Process Shot | 3 | Chuck Baltazar | J. Bowes Bond | Elberon Farm | 7 furlongs | 1:23.80 | $28,050 | | |
| 1969 | § Grey Slacks | 4 | Eddie Belmonte | H. Allen Jerkens | Hobeau Farm | 7 furlongs | 1:23.00 | $28,400 | | |
| 1968 | Mac's Sparkler | 6 | William Boland | H. Allen Jerkens | Hobeau Farm | 7 furlongs | 1:22.60 | $28,050 | | |
At Aqueduct
| 1967 | Triple Brook | 5 | Braulio Baeza | A. Ridgely White | Norman P. Bate | 7 furlongs | 1:23.80 | $27,600 | | |
| 1966 | Queen Empress | 4 | Braulio Baeza | Edward A. Neloy | Wheatley Stable | 7 furlongs | 1:23.00 | $27,150 | | |
| 1965 | Affectionately | 5 | Walter Blum | Hirsch Jacobs | Ethel D. Jacobs | 7 furlongs | 1:23.00 | $58,900 | | |
| 1964 | § No Resisting | 4 | John L. Rotz | W.C. Winfrey | Wheatley Stable | 7 furlongs | 1:23.80 | $28,650 | | |
| 1963 | Cicada | 4 | Larry Adams | Casey Hayes | Meadow Stable | 7 furlongs | 1:22.80 | $21,750 | | |
At Belmont Park
| 1962 | Rose O'Neill | 4 | Manuel Ycaza | Ted Saladin | Bert W. Martin | 7 furlongs | 1:23.60 | $23,300 | | |
| 1961 | Sun Glint | 4 | Sidney Cole | Horace A. Jones | Calumet Farm | 7 furlongs | 1:23.60 | $24,650 | | |
At Aqueduct
| 1960 | Mommy Dear | 4 | William Boland | Eddie Hayward | Circle M Farm | 7 furlongs | 1:22.60 | $29,200 | | |
At Belmont Park
| 1959 | Dandy Blitzen | 4 | Phil I. Grimm | William A. LaRue | B. A. Dario | 7 furlongs | 1:22.60 | $29,650 | | |
| 1958 | Outer Space | 4 | Eldon Nelson | James W. Maloney | Mrs. Gerard S. Smith | 7 furlongs | 1:23.80 | $29,600 | | |
| 1957 | Plotter | 4 | Pete Anderson | William Post | Harry La Montagne | 7 furlongs | 1:24.20 | $23,700 | | |
| 1956 | Miz Clementine | 5 | Eddie Arcaro | Horace A. Jones | Calumet Farm | 7 furlongs | 1:23.40 | $23,200 | | |
At Aqueduct
| 1955 | Searching | 3 | Conn McCreary | Hirsch Jacobs | Ethel D. Jacobs | 7 furlongs | 1:23.60 | $28,725 | | Division 1 |
| 1955 | Talora | 4 | Henry Moreno | Casey Hayes | Meadow Stable | 7 furlongs | 1:24.60 | $28,725 | | Division 2 |
| 1954 | Canadiana (Canada) | 4 | Charles O'Brien | Gordon J. McCann | E. P. Taylor | 7 furlongs | 1:23.40 | $32,450 | | |
| 1953 | § Home-Made | 3 | Eric Guerin | William C. Winfrey | Alfred G. Vanderbilt II | 7 furlongs | 1:24.60 | $24,325 | | |
| 1952 | Marta | 5 | Conn McCreary | Woody Stephens | Woodvale Farm | 1 1/16 miles | 1:45.00 | $28,250 | | |
| 1949–1951 | | Race not held | | | | | | | | |
| 1948 | Conniver | 4 | Ted Atkinson | William Post | Harry La Montagne | 1 1/16 miles | 1:43.60 | $29,450 | | |

Notes:
† In 1999, Hurricane Bertie finished first, but was disqualified and placed second; consequently, Gold Princess was placed first.
§ Ran as part of an entry

== See also ==
- List of American and Canadian Graded races
