= John Parisella =

American horse trainer (1944–2026)

Personal information
- Born: September 1, 1944 New York City, U.S.
- Died: July 3, 2026 (aged 81) Long Island, New York, U.S.
- Occupation: Trainer

Horse racing career
- Sport: Horse racing
- Career wins: 1,241

Major racing wins
- Lady Finger Stakes (1980); Beaugay Stakes (1982); Bernard Baruch Handicap (1983); Correction Handicap (1983, 1984, 1985); Distaff Handicap (1983); Firenze Handicap (1983); Juvenile Stakes (1983); Nashua Stakes (1983); Next Move Handicap (1983); Affectionately Handicap (1984); Kings Point Handicap (1984); Roamer Handicap (1984); Westchester Handicap (1984); Busher Stakes (1985); Aqueduct Handicap (1985, 1995); Garden City Stakes (1985); Gazelle Stakes (1985); California Derby (1987); Golden Poppy Handicap (1988); Maryland Million Ladies (1988); Miami Mile Stakes (1988, 1989); San Gabriel Handicap (1988); Wilshire Stakes (1988); All-American Handicap (1989); Grey Lag Handicap (1995); Battlefield Stakes (1998); Bed O' Roses Handicap (2000)

Racing awards
- Aqueduct Champion trainer (1980 & 1994 Spring, 1993-94 inner track)

Significant horses
- Jones Time Machine; Simply Majestic; Chapel of Dreams; Kamikaze Rick

John Parisella (September 1, 1944 – July 3, 2026) was an American horse trainer known for training the racehorses Fight Over and Simply Majestic. He last raced during 2016 and by year's end had 1,241 career wins.

== Early life and career ==
Parisella was born in Brooklyn to an Italian Catholic family. Parisella started his career as an assistant to Tommy Gullo, a legendary betting trainer. His mentor was horse trainer John P. Campo. Later he became a full-fledge horse trainer training horses for his uncle Joe Scandore who managed horses for James Caan, Don Adams, Telly Savalas and Don Rickles.

He pioneered the use of foreign horses, mostly from Canada and turning them into stakes winners.

== Personal life and death ==
Parisella was married twice. In 1975, he married Bernadette Birk, the former wife of horse trainer Robert J. Frankel. Parisella and Frankel were originally friends as well as competitors. Parisella raised his step-daughter Bethenny Frankel (Birk's daughter with Frankel) as his own child from the time she was five years old. Bethenny went on to become a reality television star and businesswoman. He was also married to Melissa Parisella, with whom he has a daughter, Gabrielle (b. 1989). They divorced and Melissa has since remarried twice: first to American football player Mike Keller, with whom she had two children.

He appeared twice on The Johnny Carson Show. Parisella died at a hospital in Long Island, New York, on July 3, 2026, at the age of 81.
