= Endine Stakes =

- Class: Grade III
- Location: Delaware Park Racetrack; Stanton, Delaware, United States
- Inaugurated: 1971
- Race type: Thoroughbred - Flat racing
- Website: www.delawarepark.com

Race information
- Distance: 6 furlong sprint
- Surface: Dirt
- Track: left-handed
- Qualification: Fillies & Mares, three-years-old & up
- Weight: Assigned
- Purse: $150,000

The Endine Stakes is an American Thoroughbred horse race held annually in mid September at Delaware Park Racetrack in Stanton, Delaware. A Grade III six furlong sprint on dirt, the race is open to fillies and mares age three and older.

Inaugurated in 1971, the race was named in honor of Endine, a filly owned by Jane du Pont Lunger who won back-to-back runnings of the Delaware Handicap in 1958 and 1959.

There was no race run from 1983 through 1995.

== Winners since 1996 ==
Year	Winner	Age	Jockey	Trainer	Owner	Time
2011	Eve Giselle	4	Javier Santiago	Tim Ritchey	Bean Counter Stables	1:08.84
2010	Secret Gypsy	5	Jamie Theriot	Ronny Werner	Hills/Kueh	1:10.23
2009	Bold Union	3	Jose A. Velez, Jr.	Kelly J. Breen	George & Lori Hall	1:10.41
2008	Sweet Hope	3	Gabriel Saez	J. Larry Jones	High Bank Syndicate	1:10.07
2007	Silmaril	6	Jeremy Rose	Chris Grove	Quick/Feifarek	1:09.52
2006	Miraculous Miss	3	Ramon Dominguez	Steve Klesaris	Puglisi Stables/Klesaris	1:09.82
2005	Umpateedle	6	Aaron Gryder	Mark Shuman	Michael Gill	1:10.18
2004	Ebony Breeze	4	Heberto Castillo, Jr.	William I. Mott	Kinsman Stable	1:09.73
2003	House Party	3	José A. Santos	H. Allen Jerkens	Joseph V. Shields, Jr.	1:08.35
2002	Xtra Heat	4	Harry Vega	John E. Salzman, Sr.	Taylor/Deitchman/Salzman	1:10.91
2001	Xtra Heat	3	Rick Wilson	John E. Salzman, Sr.	Taylor/Deitchman/Salzman	1:09.64
2000	Superduper Miss	4	Tommy Turner	Paul Rizzo	Debby Oxley	1:10.22
1999	Hurricane Bertie	4	Pat Day	Bernard S. Flint	Bertram/Klein	1:08.75
1998	Sovereign Lady	4	Mike E. Smith	Claude R. McGaughey III	not found	1:09.43
1997	Dancin Renee	5	Jose A. Velez, Jr.	Robert Triola	Sanford Bacon	1:10.04
1996	Hay Hanne	4	Jose A. Velez, Jr.	not found	not found	1:10.30

== Earlier winners ==
- 1982 - Wading Power
- 1981 - Veiled Look
- 1980 - Candy Éclair
- 1979 - Quatre Saisons
- 1978 - Dainty Dotsie
- 1977 - My Juliet
- 1976 - Donetta
- 1975 - Honky Star
- 1974 - Miss Rebound
- 1973 - Light Hearted
- 1972 - Main Pan
- 1971 - Royal Signal
