= It's Tricky (horse) =

American-bred Thoroughbred racehorse

- Sire: Mineshaft
- Grandsire: A.P. Indy
- Dam: Catboat
- Damsire: Tale of the Cat
- Sex: Filly
- Foaled: 2008
- Country: United States
- Colour: Bay
- Breeder: Stonerside Stable
- Owner: Godolphin Racing LLC
- Trainer: Kiaran McLaughlin
- Record: 12: 8–3–0
- Earnings: $1,166,500

Major wins
- Busher Stakes (2011); Acorn Stakes (2011); Coaching Club American Oaks (2011); Top Flight Handicap (2012); Distaff Handicap (2012); Ogden Phipps Handicap (2012)

It's Tricky (foaled February 26, 2008 in Kentucky - 2017) was an American Thoroughbred racemare. She was sired by Mineshaft, who also sired the Kentucky Derby contender, Dialed In. She was out of the mare Catboat. Owned by Godolphin Racing LLC and trained by Kiaran McLaughlin, in 2011 she won the Busher Stakes, the Acorn Stakes and the Coaching Club American Oaks.

== 2010 season ==
On November 28, 2010, It's Tricky won her first race a 6 furlong maiden race. She was ridden by Alan Garcia.

== 2011 season ==
On January 26, 2011, It's Tricky won the 1 mile 70 yards long allowance race with Eddie Castro.

On February 20, 2011, It's Tricky won the Busher Stakes going 1 mile 70 yards with Eddie Castro. She won by 8 lengths as a favourite. She was perfect in three starts.

On April 2, 2011, It's Tricky finished 4th in the Gulfstream Park Oaks to R Heat Lightning. Her jockey was Alan Garcia.

On June 11, 2011, It's Tricky won the Acorn Stakes by 3 3/4 lengths over the favorite Turbulent Descent.

On July 23, 2011, It's Tricky won the Coaching Club American Oaks. She beat the strong field of Joyful Victory, Black-Eyed Susan Stakes winner Royal Delta, Mother Goose Stakes winner Buster's Ready and Kentucky Oaks winner Plum Pretty.

== 2012 season ==
On March 3, 2012, It's Tricky won the Grade II Top Flight Handicap at Aqueduct Racetrack under jockey Ramon Dominguez.

On April 14, 2012, It's Tricky won the Distaff Handicap as the favorite, and on May 28, 2012, she won the Ogden Phipps Handicap.

== Retirement and death ==
It's Tricky produced three foals as a broodmare. Her first foal, foaled in 2014, is a Medaglia d'Oro filly named Too Complicated, who never went into race training due to a physical issue and is now a broodmare. Her 2015 foal, Enticed, who is also by Medaglia d'Oro, won the Kentucky Jockey Club Stakes and Gotham Stakes and finished 14th in the 2018 Kentucky Derby. It's Tricky's 2016 foal by Ghostzapper, Enliven, is currently in race training.

It's Tricky died of complications of laminitis in 2017.

== Career statistics ==
Finish	Jockey	Race	1st	2nd	3rd	Time
2nd		Beldame Invitational Stakes	Royal Delta	It's Tricky		
3rd		Personal Ensign Handicap	Love And Pride		It's Tricky	
1st	E. Castro	Ogden Phipps Handicap	It's Tricky	Cash for Clunkers	Awesome Maria	1:41.73
1st	E. Castro	Distaff Handicap	It's Tricky	C C's Pal	Dontbeshy I'll Buy	1:22.39
1st	Ramon Dominguez	Top Flight Handicap	It's Tricky			
1st	E. Castro	Coaching Club American Oaks	It's Tricky	Plum Pretty	Royal Delta	1:49.15
1st	E. Castro	Acorn Stakes	It's Tricky	Turbulent Descent	Her Smile	1:25:48
4th	A. Garcia	Gulfstream Oaks	R Heat Lightning	Island School	Salary Drive	1:49:27
1st	E. Castro	Busher Stakes	It's Tricky	Daring Realty	Portside	1:43:21
1st	E. Castro	Allowance	It's Tricky	Buster's Ready	Le Mi Geaux	1:44:59
1st	A. Garcia	MSW	It's Tricky	Dattts Cool	Kerffufle	1:10:84

== Pedigree ==
Pedigree of It's Tricky (USA), Bay filly, 2008
Sire Mineshaft 1999	A.P. Indy; 1989	Seattle Slew	Bold Reasoning
Sire Mineshaft 1999	A.P. Indy; 1989	Seattle Slew	My Charmer
Sire Mineshaft 1999	A.P. Indy; 1989	Weekend Surprise	Secretariat
Sire Mineshaft 1999	A.P. Indy; 1989	Weekend Surprise	Lassie Dear
Sire Mineshaft 1999	Prospectors Delite; 1989	Mr. Prospector	Raise a Native
Sire Mineshaft 1999	Prospectors Delite; 1989	Mr. Prospector	Gold Digger
Sire Mineshaft 1999	Prospectors Delite; 1989	Up The Flagpole	Hoist The Flag
Sire Mineshaft 1999	Prospectors Delite; 1989	Up The Flagpole	The Garden Club
Dam Catboat 2001	Tale Of The Cat; 1994	Storm Cat	Storm Bird
Dam Catboat 2001	Tale Of The Cat; 1994	Storm Cat	Terlingua
Dam Catboat 2001	Tale Of The Cat; 1994	Yarn	Mr. Prospector
Dam Catboat 2001	Tale Of The Cat; 1994	Yarn	Narrate
Dam Catboat 2001	Northern Fleet; 1992	Afleet	Mr. Prospector
Dam Catboat 2001	Northern Fleet; 1992	Afleet	Polite Lady
Dam Catboat 2001	Northern Fleet; 1992	Glenorthern	Northern Fling
Dam Catboat 2001	Northern Fleet; 1992	Glenorthern	Glenora
