= Smart Deb =

American-bred Thoroughbred racehorse

- Sire: Dedicate
- Grandsire: Princequillo
- Dam: Demree
- Damsire: Revoked
- Sex: Filly
- Foaled: 1960
- Country: United States
- Colour: Bay
- Breeder: Russell L. Reineman
- Owner: Marion Reineman
- Trainer: Arnold N. Winick
- Rider: Bill Hartack
- Record: 37: 16-4-8
- Earnings: US$383,765

Major wins
- Princess Pat Stakes (1962); Matron Stakes (1962); Arlington Lassie Stakes (1962); Arlington Matron Handicap (1963); Distaff Handicap (1964); Suwannee River Stakes (1964)

Awards
- DRF & TRA American Champion Two-Year-Old Filly (1962)

Smart Deb (foaled 1960) was an American Thoroughbred Champion racehorse.

== Background ==
Smart Deb was bred by Russell L. Reineman and raced under the name of his wife, Marion. She was trained by Arnold Winick.

== Racing career ==
In 1962, Smart Deb had an outstanding racing campaign. Unbeaten in seven straight races, she won her eighth but was disqualified and placed last in the September 27, 1962 edition of the Astarita Stakes at Aqueduct Racetrack. At the end of the year, Smart Deb was voted American Champion Two-Year-Old Filly by the Thoroughbred Racing Association and Daily Racing Form. The rival Turf & Sport Digest award was won by Affectionately. She retired from racing after her four-year-old campaign with sixteen wins from thirty-seven starts and earnings of $383,765.

== Breeding record ==
As a broodmare for Russell Reineman, Smart Deb was bred to some of the top racehorses including Secretariat, Buckpasser, Herbager, Gun Bow, Personality and Sir Ivor. While twelve of her thirteen foals raced, none achieved anything close to Smart Deb's level of success.
