= Process Shot =

American Thoroughbred racehorse

- Sire: Restless Wind
- Grandsire: Windy City
- Dam: Possessed
- Damsire: Determine
- Sex: Filly
- Foaled: 1966
- Country: United States
- Colour: Bay
- Breeder: Elberon Farm
- Owner: Elberon Farm
- Trainer: J. Bowes Bond
- Record: 43: 20-11-5
- Earnings: $465,791

Major wins
- Black-Eyed Susan Stakes (1969); Barbara Fritchie Handicap (1970); Vagrancy Handicap (1970); Distaff Handicap (1970); Interborough Handicap (1971); Betsy Ross Handicap (1970); Adirondack Stakes (1968); Arlington-Washington Lassie Stakes (1968); Mermaid Stakes (1968); Polly Drummond Stakes (1968); Colleen Stakes (1968); Bryn Mawr Stakes (1969); Flirtation Stakes (1969); Whitemarsh Handicap (1970)

Awards
- American Champion Two-Year-Old Filly (1968)

Process Shot (foaled 1966 in Florida) was an American Champion racemare. Owned and bred by Elberon Farm, she descended from her sire Restless Wind out of a Determine mare named Possessed. Process Shot is probably best remembered for her win in the 1968 Black-Eyed Susan Stakes on May 16, 1969.

== Racing career ==
=== 1968: two-year-old season ===
As a two-year-old, Process Shot won eight of nine races over eight months, including six stakes races. She broke her maiden in May 1968 and wheeled back to win her second race in an allowance race at Philadelphia Park in Pennsylvania in June. In July, she won the Polly Drummond Stakes at Delaware Park Racetrack at five furlongs in a time of 0:58.40. The first weekend of August, she won the 5.5 furlong Colleen Stakes at Monmouth Park in New Jersey. In late August, Process Shot won the Adirondack Stakes at Saratoga Race Course on Travers Stakes weekend in 1:10.40 under jockey Chuck Baltazar. A month later, in late September, she traveled to Chicago, Illinois, and captured the Arlington-Washington Lassie Stakes title in the six furlong dirt race. At the end of autumn 1968, Process Shot won the Mermaid Stakes at Atlantic City Race Course. In the last race of her freshman campaign, she placed second to Predictable in the $125,000 mile and a sixteenth Selima Stakes at Laurel Park Racecourse in Maryland. Process Shot was named American Champion Two-Year-Old Filly for 1968 by Turf & Sports Digest magazine and the Thoroughbred Racing Association. The rival Daily Racing Form award was won by Gallant Bloom.

=== 1969: three-year-old season ===
Process Shot started off her sophomore season with a third in the Princeton Handicap at Philadelphia Park in April 1969. Her owner, Sonny Werblin of Elberon Farms (who also owned the New York Jets), and trainer J. Bowes Bond decided to run Process Shot in the de facto second jewel of the filly triple crown, the $40,000 Black-Eyed Susan Stakes at Pimlico Race Course in Baltimore, Maryland on May 16, 1969. In that race, Process Shot beat a field of nine fillies, including stakes winners Loyal Ruler and Around the Horn. She won the mile and one sixteenth race in a final time of 1:44 flat under regular jockey Chuck Baltazar.

In her next race, Process Shot finished second to Gallant Bloom in the Post-Deb Stakes at a mile and a sixteenth at Monmouth Park. Later that year, she won the Bryn Mawr Stakes at Philadelphia Park and the Flirtation Stakes over six furlongs at Pimlico Race Course.

=== Later racing career ===
Early in her four-year-old season, Process Shot won the $65,000 Barbara Fritchie Handicap on President's Day in 1970. Ridden by jockey Larry Adams, she ran the seven-furlong sprint in 1:23.60 at Laurel Park Racecourse. She then competed in two handicap races, including the Distaff Handicap run at 7 furlongs in April at Aqueduct Racetrack. At the end of May, Process Shot won the Vagrancy Handicap at 6.5 furlongs at Belmont Park. In June, she raced in the Hempstead Handicap, which is now called the Ogden Phipps Handicap, at Belmont Park. In that race, she placed second to champion Ta Wee. Later that summer, Process Shot packed up and won the Whitemarsh Handicap at the old Keystone Race Track in Pennsylvania and then shipped again to the Jersey Shore, where she won the 1970 edition of the Betsy Ross Handicap at Monmouth Park. In 1971, after a seven-month layoff, Process Shot ran in four handicap sprints in 1971. She placed second again in the Hempstead Handicap and then finished third the Coral Gables Handicap. Her only stakes victory as a five-year-old came in the Interborough Handicap at six furlongs at Aqueduct Racetrack.

== Retirement ==
Process Shot was retired at the end of 1971.

== Pedigree ==
Pedigree of Process Shot, bay mare, 1966
| Sire Restless Wind | Windy City | Wyndham | Blenheim |
| Sire Restless Wind | Windy City | Wyndham | Bossover |
| Sire Restless Wind | Windy City | Staunton | The Satrap |
| Sire Restless Wind | Windy City | Staunton | Crotanstown |
| Sire Restless Wind | Lump Sugar | Bull Lea | Bull Dog |
| Sire Restless Wind | Lump Sugar | Bull Lea | Rose Leaves |
| Sire Restless Wind | Lump Sugar | Sugar Run | St. Germans |
| Sire Restless Wind | Lump Sugar | Sugar Run | Memento |
| Dam Possessed | Determine | Alibhai | Hyperion |
| Dam Possessed | Determine | Alibhai | Teresina |
| Dam Possessed | Determine | Koubis | Mahmoud |
| Dam Possessed | Determine | Koubis | Brown Biscuit |
| Dam Possessed | Songcraft | Endeavour | British Empire |
| Dam Possessed | Songcraft | Endeavour | Himalaya |
| Dam Possessed | Songcraft | Singing Witch | Royal Minstrel |
| Dam Possessed | Songcraft | Singing Witch | Broomsage (family: 1-l) |
