= Affectionately =

American-bred Thoroughbred racehorse

- Sire: Swaps
- Grandsire: Khaled
- Dam: Searching
- Damsire: War Admiral
- Sex: Filly
- Foaled: 1960
- Country: United States
- Colour: Dark Bay
- Breeder: Bieber-Jacobs Stables
- Owner: Ethel D. Jacobs
- Trainer: Hirsch Jacobs
- Record: 52 : 28-8-6
- Earnings: $546,659

Major wins
- Fashion Stakes (1962); National Stallion Stakes (filly division) (1962); Polly Drummand Stakes (1962); Spinaway Stakes (1962); Sorority Stakes (1962); Astoria Stakes (1962); Interborough Handicap (1963, 1964); Vosburgh Stakes (1964); Correction Handicap (1963, 1964); Sport Page Handicap (1964); Top Flight Handicap (1965); Distaff Handicap (1965); Vagrancy Handicap (1965); Liberty Bell Handicap (1965); Toboggan Handicap (1965)

Awards
- TSD American Champion Two-Year-Old Filly (1962); American Champion Sprint Horse (1965)

Honours
- U.S. Racing Hall of Fame (1989) #81 – Top 100 U.S. Racehorses of the 20th Century; Affectionately Handicap at Aqueduct Racetrack
- Last updated on November 25, 2007

Affectionately (April 26, 1960 – 1979) was an American Thoroughbred racehorse.

== Background ==
She was sired by 1956 American Horse of the Year Swaps, out of the racing mare Searching. Searching's dam was Big Hurry, by Black Toney out of La Troienne. Searching's sire was War Admiral, winner of the American Triple Crown of Thoroughbred Racing, whose own sire was Man o' War .

Foaled on April 26, 1960, at the farm of Dr. Charles Hagyard near Lexington, Kentucky, she was bred by the partnership of owner/trainer Hirsch Jacobs and Isidor Bieber.

== Racing career ==
Campaigned under the name of Jacobs' wife Ethel, Affectionately won nine of her first ten starts as a two-year-old. In the Matron Stakes she was finally beaten by Smart Deb.

At ages three and four Affectionately was very good, winning two Interborough Handicaps, the Vosburgh, and the Correction Handicap. When she turned five, however, she gained the successes that put her on the list of the 100 best racehorses of the twentieth century. Under high weights, she took the Top Flight Handicap, the Vagrancy Handicap and a number of other important stakes races. She retired sound with eighteen stakes wins, one of only two females to break the half-million-dollar earnings mark.

== Retirement ==
Her first foal was 1970 co-American Horse of the Year Personality, who shared the honor with Fort Marcy. Affectionately produced three other foals, of which one started and won.

She died in 1979. Ten years later, she was voted into the Hall of Fame, an honor her dam, Searching, was accorded the year before.

== Assessment and honors ==
At the end of 1962, Affectionately was voted American Champion Two-Year-Old Filly by Turf & Sport Digest. The rival Thoroughbred Racing Association and Daily Racing Form awards were won by Smart Deb.

Jacobs, who was a Hall of Fame conditioner, called her "the best horse I've ever trained". He had trained Stymie and Hail To Reason, the sire of Personality.

In the Blood-Horse magazine List of the Top 100 U.S. Racehorses of the 20th Century, Affectionately's granddamsire Man o' War was at #1, her damsire War Admiral at #13, her sire Swaps at #20 and Affectionately herself at #81.

== Pedigree ==
Pedigree of Affectionately
Sire Swaps	Khaled	Hyperion	Gainsborough
Sire Swaps	Khaled	Hyperion	Selene
Sire Swaps	Khaled	Eclair	Ethnarch
Sire Swaps	Khaled	Eclair	Black Ray
Sire Swaps	Iron Reward	Beau Pere	Son-in-Law
Sire Swaps	Iron Reward	Beau Pere	Cinna
Sire Swaps	Iron Reward	Iron Maiden	War Admiral
Sire Swaps	Iron Reward	Iron Maiden	Betty Derr
Dam Searching	War Admiral	Man o' War	Fair Play
Dam Searching	War Admiral	Man o' War	Mahubah
Dam Searching	War Admiral	Brushup	Sweep
Dam Searching	War Admiral	Brushup	Annette K.
Dam Searching	Big Hurry	Black Toney	Peter Pan
Dam Searching	Big Hurry	Black Toney	Belgravia
Dam Searching	Big Hurry	La Troienne	Teddy
Dam Searching	Big Hurry	La Troienne	Helene de Troie
