= My Juliet =

American-bred Thoroughbred racehorse

- Sire: Gallant Romeo
- Grandsire: Gallant Man
- Dam: My Bupers
- Damsire: Bupers
- Sex: Filly
- Foaled: 1972
- Country: United States
- Colour: Dark Bay/Brown
- Breeder: J. R. Bettersworth
- Owner: George Weasel, Jr.
- Trainer: 1) Steve A. Long, 2) Leland G. Ripley, 3) Steve A. Long, 4) Eugene Euster
- Record: 36: 24-4-2
- Earnings: US$548,859

Major wins
- Pocahontas Stakes (1974); Anne Arundel Stakes (1975); Black-Eyed Susan Stakes (1975); Cotillion Handicap (1975); Dogwood Stakes (1975); Next Move Handicap (1975); Test Stakes (1975); Ta Wee Handicap (1976); Vagrancy Handicap (1976); Vosburgh Handicap (1976); Las Flores Handicap (1977); Michigan Mile And One-Eighth Handicap (1977); Neshaminy Handicap (1977); Endine Stakes (1977)

Awards
- American Champion Sprint Horse (1976)

Honours
- National Museum of Racing and Hall of Fame (2019); My Juliet Stakes at Philadelphia Park Racetrack; My Juliet Café in the Picnic Grove at Philadelphia Park Racetrack

My Juliet (1972–2001) was an American Thoroughbred champion racehorse who defeated both male and female competitors when earning the Eclipse Award for Outstanding Sprint Horse in 1976. She was inducted into the National Museum of Racing and Hall of Fame in 2019.

== Background ==
Bred in Kentucky by J. R. Betterworth, My Juliet was a bay mare who stood 15.2 hands (62 inches, 157 cm). She was out of the mare My Bupers, who never won a race. My Bupers later became famous as the dam of Snaafi Dancer, by Northern Dancer, who was sold for a then world record of $10.2 million. Her sire was Gallant Romeo, the multiple stakes winning son of U.S. Racing Hall of Fame inductee Gallant Man. Gallant Romeo also sired Gallant Bob who earned 1975 Champion Sprint Horse honors.

My Juliet was purchased by Rex Ladd (of Merino, Colorado) as a yearling in California for just $7,500, then was privately purchased at age two by George Weasel Jr. for $40,000. My Juliet was initially trained by Steve A. Long, Leland G. Ripley then again by Long. Both raced her from a base at Keystone Racetrack (now known as Philadelphia Park Racetrack). Eugene Euster took over during her three-year-old season.

== Two-year-old season ==
She began her career in racing as a two-year-old in 1974, scoring four wins in five starts. She made her debut at Fonner Park in Grand Island, Nebraska, finishing second. She won the remaining four starts, including her first important win at Churchill Downs in the Pocahontas Stakes.

== Three-year-old season ==
In the spring of 1975, My Juliet suffered the only three-race losing streak in her career when she finished second in the Ashland, third in the La Troienne and tenth in the Kentucky Oaks. On May 16, My Juliet's connections decided to run her in the what was then the de facto second jewel of the filly triple crown, the Grade II $65,000 Black-Eyed Susan Stakes at Pimlico Race Course. That day in Baltimore, Maryland My Juliet beat a strong field of six stakes winners including favorite Gala Lil and Funalon. She completed the one and one sixteenth mile race on dirt in 1:44.00 under jockey Alan Hill.

Just 13 days later, Long dropped her back in distance to six furlongs in the Miss Woodford Stakes. My Juliet ran the first quarter-mile in "an of unheard of" 20 3/5 seconds, and completed the half-mile in an "astounding" 43 seconds. Although she tired in the final furlong to finish fifth (beaten by just four lengths), she earned the respect of sportswriter Steve Haskin, who called her something special.

My Juliet spent the rest of the year travelling between racetracks large and small from the East Coast to Nebraska. One of her biggest wins was the then Grade II Cotillion Handicap at Keystone. She also won the Dogwood Stakes at Churchill Downs, the Ak-Sar-Ben Princess at Ak-sar-ben, the Test Stakes at Saratoga, the Fair Haven Handicap at Monmouth Park, the Anne Arundel Handicap at Monmouth and the Next Move Handicap at Aqueduct. She ended the year winning nine of fifteen starts and established herself as one of the top sprinters of either sex racing in the United States.

My Juliet was rated at 123 pounds by the Daily Racing Form in their Free Handicap for three-year-old fillies, second to the great Ruffian.

== Four-year-old season ==
My Juliet began her four-year-old campaign in California, finishing third in the Malibu Stakes on January 10, 1976. She returned to the east coast to win an overnight handicap at Aqueduct before finishing eighth in the Gallorette Handicap. She then won the Vagrancy Handicap for fillies and mares at Belmont Park but fractured a foreleg while doing so. Out of racing for more than five months, she came back to beat Kentucky Derby and Belmont Stakes winner Bold Forbes and other males in winning the Vosburgh Stakes, also at Belmont Park. At a time when there was only one Eclipse Award for horses of either sex in the Sprint category, My Juliet was voted the American Champion Sprint Horse of 1976.

My Juliet returned to race at age five. She began her campaign on January 1 in California with a win against a field of females in the Las Flores Handicap at Santa Anita Park. She went on to win the 1977 Endine Stakes at Delaware Park, again against a field of females, plus defeated males in winning both the Neshaminy Handicap at Keystone Racetrack and in the Michigan Mile And One-Eighth Handicap at Detroit Race Course. In the Neshaminy Handicap, she broke the track record by four-fifths of a second with a time of 1:14 3/5 for 6 1/2 furlongs.

== Retirement ==
My Juliet retired a winner of twenty-four races, of which seventeen were stakes. She won at 14 different racetracks in 10 states: Pennsylvania, Kentucky, Maryland, New York, New Jersey, California, Illinois, Nebraska, Delaware and Michigan.

As a broodmare in Kentucky, she produced ten named foals of which eight were winners. Her most notable foals were both by Alydar:

- Tis Juliet (b. 1986) - won the Shuvee Handicap
- Stella Madrid (b. 1987) - won the Frizette, Spinaway, Matron and Acorn Stakes. also a stakes-producing broodmare

My Juliet died at age twenty-nine in November 2001. She raced for most of her career from a base at Philadelphia Park Racetrack (formerly known as Keystone Racetrack). In 1979, the track created the My Juliet Stakes and built the My Juliet Café in the Picnic Grove in her honor.

She was inducted into the National Museum of Racing and Hall of Fame in 2019.

== Pedigree ==
Pedigree of My Juliet
| Sire Gallant Romeo | Gallant Man | Migoli | Bois Roussel |
| Sire Gallant Romeo | Gallant Man | Migoli | Mah Iran |
| Sire Gallant Romeo | Gallant Man | Majideh | Mahmoud |
| Sire Gallant Romeo | Gallant Man | Majideh | Qurrat-al-Ain |
| Sire Gallant Romeo | Juliet's Nurse | Count Fleet | Reigh Count |
| Sire Gallant Romeo | Juliet's Nurse | Count Fleet | Quickly |
| Sire Gallant Romeo | Juliet's Nurse | Nursemaid | Luke McLuke |
| Sire Gallant Romeo | Juliet's Nurse | Nursemaid | Wonderful One |
| Dam My Bupers | Bupers | Double Jay | Balladier |
| Dam My Bupers | Bupers | Double Jay | Broomshot |
| Dam My Bupers | Bupers | Busanda | War Admiral |
| Dam My Bupers | Bupers | Busanda | Businesslike |
| Dam My Bupers | Princess Revoked | Revoked | Blue Larkspur |
| Dam My Bupers | Princess Revoked | Revoked | Gala Belle |
| Dam My Bupers | Princess Revoked | Miss Muffet | Challedon |
| Dam My Bupers | Princess Revoked | Miss Muffet | Bona Via (Family 6-a) |
