= Searching (horse) =

American-bred Thoroughbred racehorse

- Sire: War Admiral
- Grandsire: Man o' War
- Dam: Big Hurry
- Damsire: Black Toney
- Sex: Filly
- Foaled: 1952
- Country: United States
- Color: Bay
- Breeder: Ogden Phipps
- Owner: Ethel D. Jacobs
- Trainer: "Sunny Jim" Fitzsimmons; Hirsch Jacobs at 3
- Record: 89: 25-14-16
- Earnings: $327,381

Major wins
- Vagrancy Handicap (1955); Gallorette Handicap (1955, 1957); Diana Handicap (1956, 1958); Maskette Handicap (1956); Top Flight Handicap (1956); Correction Handicap (1956, 1958); Distaff Handicap (1957); Molly Pitcher Handicap (1958); Matriarch Stakes (1958)

Honors
- United States' Racing Hall of Fame (1978)
- Last updated on December 20, 2021

Searching (1952–1973) was an American Hall of Fame Thoroughbred racemare.

Foaled at Claiborne Farm near Paris, Kentucky where the Wheatley Stable (founded in 1926 by Gladys Mills Phipps and her brother, Ogden L. Mills) bred and raised its horses. After the Second World War, Gladys's son Ogden Phipps purchased a number of horses from the estate of Colonel Edward R. Bradley and his Idle Hour Stock Farm. Among them was the good racing mare Big Hurry.

Phipps bred Big Hurry (the racing daughter of Bradley's favorite stallion, Black Toney, out of Bradley's broodmare La Troienne) to the fourth winner of the U.S. Triple Crown Champion, War Admiral. From this match came a bay filly he named Searching. Searching raced poorly in her first 20 starts under Hall of Fame trainer James E. Fitzsimmons, Phipps sold her to Ethel Jacobs, the wife of another Hall of Fame trainer, Hirsch Jacobs. Under Hirsch, Searching improved immensely. In her next 69 starts, many of them important stakes, she was in the money most of the time.

As a broodmare, Searching produced eight foals, seven of them winners, and three stakes winners, including Admiring and Priceless Gem. The filly that she is remembered for is Affectionately, #81 - Top 100 U.S. Racehorses of the 20th Century. Affectionately also produced Personality.

Affectionately was inducted into the U.S. Racing Hall of Fame in 1978.
