= Rush Tower, Missouri =

Locale in Missouri, U.S.

Coordinates: 38°08′53″N 90°17′31″W

Rush Tower is a locale in southeast Jefferson County in the U.S. state of Missouri.

The site sits adjacent to Harlow Island in the Mississippi River floodplain approximately 2.5 miles east of Selma on Missouri Route AA. Muddy Creek flows into the river at the location.

== History ==
The community had a post office and the Rush Tower school was located approximately 1.25 miles to the west on what is now Missouri Route AA.

In 1809 John Nicholas Maclot built a "shot tower" on the 200 foot cliff above the river. The process involved dropping molten lead globs which would solidify as they fell into pellets of the correct size for use in the muskets used in the War of 1812.
