= W-L Ranch Co. =

W-L Ranch Co. was an American Thoroughbred horse racing and breeding partnership between Hollywood film studio executive Harry M. Warner and film director Mervyn LeRoy. Warner's daughter, Doris, was married to Mervyn LeRoy.

In 1938, Harry Warner, along with his brother Jack, and Mervyn LeRoy were founding investors in Hollywood Park Racetrack in Inglewood, California. LeRoy was a member of the track's board of directors from 1941 until his death in 1987.

In addition to competing at their own racetrack, W-L Ranch Co. raced horses at Santa Anita Park and Del Mar Racetrack in California as well as at other racetracks throughout the United States until 1958 when Harry Warner died. They had two starters in the 1947 Kentucky Derby and another in 1955. Among their graded stakes race wins, the stable won the 1944 Narragansett Special, the 1948 Top Flight Handicap, the 1949 and 1957 editions of the Santa Catalina Handicap, and the 1955 Malibu Stakes, 1955 Bing Crosby Handicap, and 1956 San Diego Handicap.

One of their most famous thoroughbreds was Paperboy.
