= Conn McCreary =

American jockey and horse trainer

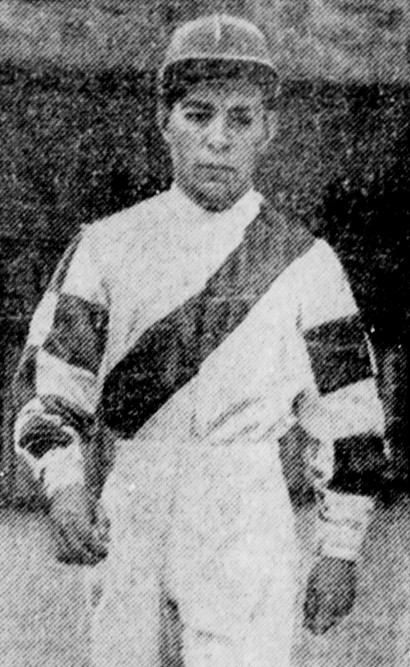
- McCreary, circa 1941

Personal information
- Born: June 17, 1921 Rush Tower, Missouri, U.S.
- Died: June 29, 1979 (aged 58)
- Occupation: Jockey

Horse racing career
- Sport: Horse racing
- Career wins: 1,263

Major racing wins
- Alabama Stakes (1941, 1943); Blue Grass Stakes (1941, 1949); Breeders' Futurity Stakes (1941); Clark Handicap (1941, 1949); Ladies Handicap (1941, 1943, 1951); Saratoga Cup (1941, 1953); Saratoga Handicap (1941, 1943, 1945, 1946, 1953, 1956); American Legion Handicap (1942); Cowdin Stakes (1942, 1951); Fall Highweight Handicap (1942, 1956); Hopeful Stakes (1942); Sanford Stakes (1942, 1945, 1954); Schuylerville Stakes (1942); Spinaway Stakes (1942); Great American Stakes (1943); Jockey Club Gold Cup (1943, 1958); Juvenile Stakes (1943); Pimlico Futurity (1943); Peter Pan Stakes (1943); Queens County Handicap (1943, 1945); Saratoga Special Stakes (1943); Test Stakes (1943, 1949); Tremont Stakes (1943, 1945); Walden Stakes (1943); Acorn Stakes (1944, 1956); Black-Eyed Susan Stakes (1944); Coaching Club American Oaks (1944); Rowe Memorial Handicap (1944); Hanshin Cup Handicap (1944); Adirondack Stakes (1945); San Juan Capistrano Handicap (1945); Travers Stakes (1945); Diana Handicap (1946, 1947, 1954, 1956); Monmouth Handicap (1946); Narragansett Special (1946); Sysonby Handicap (1946, 1951); Aqueduct Handicap (1947); Black Helen Handicap (1947); Empire City Gold Cup (1947); Massachusetts Handicap (1947); Fleetwing Handicap (1948); Metropolitan Handicap (1948); Ashland Stakes (1949); Ben Ali Handicap (1949, 1953); Daingerfield Handicap (1951); Molly Pitcher Handicap (1951); Vosburgh Stakes (1951, 1954); Dwyer Stakes (1952); Matron Stakes (1952); Questionnaire Handicap (1952, 1953); Vagrancy Handicap (1952, 1955); Widener Handicap (1952); Arlington Handicap (1953); Lawrence Realization Stakes (1953); Palm Beach Handicap (1953); Arlington Matron Stakes (1954); Bahamas Stakes (1954); Bay Shore Handicap (1954); Sport Page Handicap (1954, 1956); Washington Park Futurity (1954); Discovery Handicap (1955); Edgemere Handicap (1955); Arlington Classic (1957); Withers Stakes (1957); Brooklyn Handicap (1959) American Classic Race wins: Kentucky Derby (1944, 1951); Preakness Stakes (1944, 1952)

Honors
- United States' Racing Hall of Fame (1974)

Significant horses
- Princequillo, Pensive, Devil Diver, Armed, Twilight Tear, Stymie, Count Turf, Blue Man, Searching
- Updated on July 27, 2008

Conn N. McCreary (June 17, 1921 - June 29, 1979) was a United States Hall of Fame jockey and trainer in Thoroughbred horse racing who won four American Classic Races.

== Riding career ==
Born in St. Louis, Missouri, Conn McCreary began his professional career in 1937 and got his first win the following year at Chicago's Arlington Park. In 1941, he earned the first of his many important wins when he rode "Our Boots" to victory in the Blue Grass Stakes at Keeneland Race Course over the heavily favored Whirlaway. In the ensuing Kentucky Derby and Preakness Stakes, McCreary and "Our Boots" finished eighth and third respectively to winner Whirlaway who went on to win the U.S. Triple Crown with a victory in the Belmont Stakes. Three years later aboard the Calumet Farm colt, Pensive, McCreary himself came within a few feet of winning the U.S. Triple Crown. After victories in the Derby and Preakness, he finished second by a half a length to William Ziegler Jr.'s colt, Bounding Home. In 1951, McCreary won his second Kentucky Derby with 14:1 outsider, Count Turf and then won his second Preakness Stakes with Blue Man the following year.

A fan favorite for the drama of his come-from-behind tactics, Conn McCreary won numerous Graded stakes races at tracks across the United States, including prestige events such as the San Juan Capistrano, Blue Grass Stakes, Jockey Club Gold Cup and Travers Stakes. Among the top quality horses he rode were four Hall of Fame inductees, Devil Diver, Armed, Bric A Bac, and Stymie.

== Retirement ==
Retired from riding in 1960, Conn McCreary took up training for a time and had his own stable, MacConn Farms, where he bought and trained horses for Florida developer Andrew Capeletti. He then worked as a publicity agent for Hialeah and Calder racetracks before becoming the manager of Golden Hawk Farm in Ocala, Florida where he was employed until the time of his death in 1979.

== Honors ==
Conn McCreary was inducted in the National Museum of Racing and Hall of Fame in 1974.
