= Junior Alvarado =

Venezuelan horse jockey (born 1986)

Personal information
- Born: May 20, 1986 (age 40) Maracaibo, Venezuela
- Occupation: Jockey

Horse racing career
- Sport: Horse racing
- Career wins: 2,144 (as at 5/03/25)

Major racing wins
- Arlington-Washington Lassie Stakes (2009); Arlington-Washington Futurity Stakes (2010); Beverly D. Stakes (2010); Broadway Stakes (2011, 2015, 2018); Damon Runyon Stakes (2011, 2020); Hollie Hughes Handicap (2011, 2013, 2016); Pucker Up Stakes (2011); Turnback The Alarm Handicap (2011); Falls City Handicap (2011); Athenia Stakes (2012); Fred "Cappy" Capossela Stakes (2012); Honorable Miss Handicap (2012); Prioress Stakes (2012); Vagrancy Handicap (2012, 2013); Victory Ride Stakes (2012); Beaugay Stakes (2013); Cigar Mile Handicap (2013); Distaff Handicap (2013); Forego Stakes (2013); Fort Marcy Stakes (2013); Mervin Handicap Muniz Jr. Handicap (2013); Suburban Handicap (2013, 2015); Westchester Stakes (2013); Iowa Oaks (2014); Whitney Stakes (2014, 2026); Honey Fox Stakes (2015, 2016); Jessamine Stakes (2015); Kent Stakes (2015); Madison Stakes (2015); Nashua Stakes (2015); New York Stakes (2015); Remsen Stakes (2015); Saratoga Special Stakes (2015); Top Flight Handicap (2015); Del Mar Oaks (2016); Fall Highweight Handicap (2016); Fountain of Youth Stakes (2016); Holy Bull Stakes (2016); Just a Game Stakes (2016); Pin Oak Valley View Stakes (2016); Ballston Spa Stakes (2016); Canadian Stakes (2017); Kentucky Jockey Club Stakes (2017); Adirondack Stakes (2018); Gotham Stakes (2018); Damon Runyon Stakes (2020); Belmont Derby (2020); Breeders' Cup Dirt Mile (2022, 2023); Saudi Cup (2024); Kentucky Derby (2025); Belmont Stakes (2025); Travers Stakes (2025); Breeders' Cup (2026)

Racing awards
- Arlington Park Champion Jockey (2009)

Significant horses
- Cody's Wish, Dayoutoftheoffice, Just F Y I, Flat Out, Mohaymen, Moreno, Lubash, Sovereignty

Junior Rafael Alvarado (born May 20, 1986) is a Venezuelan jockey who competes in the sport of American Thoroughbred horse racing. He rode the winning horse Sovereignty in the 2025 Kentucky Derby and the Belmont Stakes.

== Background ==
His father, Rafael Alvarado, was also a jockey in Venezuela. He had intended to record his son's birthname as Rafael Alvarado Jr., but it was mistakenly registered as Junior Rafael Alvarado.

== Career ==
Alvarado rode his first winner as a jockey on December 30, 2005, at La Rinconada Hippodrome near Caracas, Venezuela, before moving to ride in the United States in 2007 where he got his first winner on February 17, 2007, at Gulfstream Park in Hallandale Beach, Florida.

In the 2012 Preakness Stakes, Alvarado ran fourth aboard the horse Zetterholm. He also rode Mohaymen to a fourth-place finish in the 2016 Kentucky Derby. In 2025, Alvarado rode Sovereignty to a first-place finish in both the Kentucky Derby and Belmont Stakes.

In May 2025, Alvarado was fined $62,000, or 20% of his winnings from the Kentucky Derby, and was banned for two Kentucky racing days by the Horseracing Integrity and Safety Authority for using his whip on a horse more than allowed. HISA determined he struck Sovereignty eight times during the Kentucky Derby, above the six-strike maximum. The usual fine of 10% was doubled to $62,000 due to a prior offense within the preceding 180 days. The earlier violation occurred at Churchill Downs on December 1, 2024.

On August 22, 2026, he guided Tam Tam to victory in Del Mar Oaks and Knightsbridge to victory in Pacific Classic Stakes.
