= Louis Wolfson =

American financier (1912–2007)

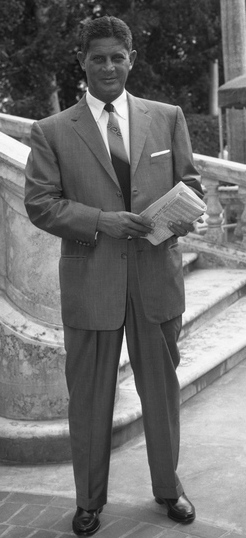
- Wilson pictured by Bert Morgan at Hialeah Race Track, 1958
- Born: January 28, 1912; St. Louis, Missouri, U.S.
- Died: December 30, 2007 (aged 95); Bal Harbour, Florida, U.S.
- Education: University of Georgia
- Spouse(s): Florence Monsky (until her death); Patrice Jacobs (until his death)
- Children: 4, including Martin

Louis Elwood Wolfson (January 28, 1912 – December 30, 2007) was an American financier, a convicted felon, and one of the first modern corporate raiders, labeled by Time as such in a 1956 article. A self-made millionaire by 28, Wolfson is credited with creating the modern hostile tender offer, which laid the technical framework to the leveraged buyout. In later years, he was a major thoroughbred horse racing participant as the owner and breeder of 1978 American Triple Crown winner, Affirmed.

Wolfson was frequently in trouble with the law. In 1957, the United States Securities and Exchange Commission ordered a ten-day suspension of trading in stock in a company Wolfson held "to prevent fraudulent and manipulative practices". In 1967, he was convicted of selling unregistered shares and obstruction of justice, for which he served nine months in a federal prison. The conviction eventually led to a scandal involving Supreme Court Justice Abe Fortas, who resigned in 1969 after returning a $20,000 retainer to a Wolfson foundation. In 1971, Wolfson was involved in a contentious legal battle with radio host Larry King over monies Wolfson supplied and King allegedly pocketed. Later King claimed Wolfson paid him $48,500 to influence President Richard Nixon's incoming U.S. Attorney General, John N. Mitchell, into reviewing Wolfson's past conviction.

== Early life ==
Wolfson was born in St. Louis, Missouri, but his family moved to Jacksonville, Florida, when he was one year old.

The child of Jewish immigrants from Lithuania, Wolfson and his seven siblings grew up in Jacksonville, where his father was a junk man/scrap metal dealer. In his teens, he boxed professionally under the name "Kid Wolf", earning from $25 to $100 per fight. Wolfson was an outstanding athlete and an All-Southern end for Jacksonville's Andrew Jackson High School, who went to the University of Georgia to play football. He left the university after two years, never graduating.

After dropping out of college, he raised $10,000 to start in business: half from a wealthy Georgia football fan, Harold Hirsch, and half from his family.

== Financier ==
He started the Florida Pipe and Supply Company to trade in building materials. Within a few years, he built this into a successful large business and was a millionaire at age 28.

In 1949, Wolfson purchased the Capital Transit Company from the North American Company for $2 million. Capital Transit held the streetcar and bus service franchise for Washington, D.C.; it had been managed conservatively and beyond its physical assets had a $7 million cash reserve. When the company disbursed $3 million in dividends to shareholders, the government revoked Capital Transit's right to operate, and Wolfson sold his shares for $13.5 million.

A 1951 takeover of Merritt-Chapman & Scott made Wolfson Chairman and CEO of the marine construction and salvage firm, but Wolfson expanded the company into shipbuilding, chemicals, and money lending, becoming one of the first conglomerates. The corporation won numerous multimillion-dollar contracts for high-profile projects, including the Glen Canyon Dam in Arizona, the United States Navy supercarrier Kitty Hawk and the Mackinac Bridge that linked Michigan's lower and upper peninsulas. Wolfson became nationally known in 1955, when he unsuccessfully attempted a hostile takeover of Montgomery Ward and Co.

His Universal Marion Co. owned the Miami Beach Sun and the Jacksonville Chronicle newspapers and made movies through a subsidiary. The firm co-financed the production of Mel Brooks' first movie, The Producers, which won an Oscar and later became a major Broadway play. The building now known as the JEA Tower in Jacksonville was called the Universal-Marion Building when the firm was the largest tenant. At its peak, his industrial and commercial empire had total assets estimated at a quarter of a billion dollars.

== Philanthropy ==
As chairman of the Wolfson Family Foundation for 35 years until the late 1980s, Wolfson directed much of the foundation's gifts to Jacksonville, Florida's medical, educational, research and religious charitable entities. Louis's father, Morris David Wolfson, began the philanthropy with a gift of $500,000 in 1946 to create Wolfson Children's Hospital. Other gifts included the Wolfson Student Center at Jacksonville University, the River Garden/Wolfson Health and Aging Center and the Louis E. Wolfson Wellness Center at Baptist Medical Center Downtown.

Louis Wolfson worked to honor the memory of his older brother, Sam. The Duval County School Board named Samuel W. Wolfson High School after his brother and the Wolfson family funded construction of Sam W. Wolfson Baseball Park, the minor-league baseball facility in Jacksonville for decades until the Baseball Grounds of Jacksonville was built in 2002–03.

== Legal and political controversies ==
In November 1957, Louis Wolfson sold a trailer company controlled by one of his interests to Detroit's Trans Continental Industries. His longtime friend, David Charnay, was chairman prior to Charnay's purchase and global modernization of Four Star International. The trailer company became Trans Continental's chief asset. Upon reviewing the sale from Louis Wolfson to David Charnay, the Securities and Exchange Commission ordered a ten-day suspension of trading in Trans Continental stock on the American and Detroit stock exchanges, based upon a conjectured and speculative reason: "To prevent fraudulent and manipulative practices".

Wolfson started a charitable foundation, which in 1966 paid Supreme Court Justice and Wolfson friend Abe Fortas a $20,000 lifetime annual retainer for unspecified consultation. Researchers suspect this sum may have represented an attempted bribery to secure Fortas's assistance with the Securities and Exchange Commission. Wolfson had appealed his conviction all the way to the Supreme Court. Although the Supreme Court had refused to review his conviction and Fortas did not participate in that decision, it was viewed as an attempt to buy his way out of a conviction. Controversy surrounded Fortas and he returned the $20,000 retainer and ultimately resigned from the Supreme Court in 1969.

In 1967, Wolfson was convicted on charges stemming from stock sales. The conviction arose when Wolfson sold unregistered shares in Continental Enterprises, Inc. to the public. Wolfson controlled Continental Enterprises, an unlisted company which was a Florida-based real-estate and movie theater business with numerous other holdings. He never denied the charges but argued that the law was misapplied in his case. The second conviction was for charges of perjury and obstruction of justice during a U.S. Securities and Exchange Commission investigation into Merritt-Chapman. He served nine months at the Federal Bureau of Prisons Federal Prison Camp, Eglin, Eglin Air Force Base. He also paid a substantial fine.

In 1971, Wolfson filed a complaint against Larry King—then a Miami radio host, later a CNN personality—for allegedly pocketing $5,000, part of a $25,000 payment destined for New Orleans District Attorney Jim Garrison, who was investigating President John F. Kennedy's assassination. King was arrested for grand larceny, but the original criminal charges were dismissed as the statute of limitations had elapsed. While a judge subsequently threw out the charge, King pled no contest to one count of passing bad checks. King was fired from WIOD after Wolfson wrote to TV and radio executives at WTVJ and WIOD claiming that King was "a menace to the public" and that his employers should pay for King's "treatment in a mental institution for six months so he can do no further harm in this community or any other."

== Criminal justice activism ==
After his incarceration, Wolfson became a prison reform advocate. He told The Miami Herald in 1971 that he had watched sadistic wardens and guards "contribute to the increase of crime. ...The medical attention was unbelievably bad. There was absolutely no uniform sentencing. ...Officials may say rehabilitation exists, but I assure you it doesn't."

As a result of his efforts, the SEC began making hearing transcripts and testimony more available, and the U.S. Senate considered changing federal penal code to eliminate harsh sentences for first-time offenders.

"It was a horrible 10 months and it ruined his life and changed him forever", his son said. "If you ever said the word judge, he'd bring out a stack of papers to prove how he was falsely charged for ulterior political motives."

== Harbor View Farm and thoroughbred racing ==
In 1960, he established Harbor View Farm in Fellowship, Marion County, Florida. He raced a number of successful thoroughbred horses including 1963 co-champion 2-year-old male Raise a Native, and 1965 Horse of the Year, Roman Brother.

Champion Hail to Reason, bred by Bieber-Jacobs Stable had raced in the name of Patrice Jacobs, his second wife. Together, in the name of Harbor View, they bred and raced the 1978 American Triple Crown winner Affirmed. Affirmed was voted Horse of the Year twice, in 1978 and 1979, and also was champion at 2 in 1977, at 3 in 1978, and at 4 in 1979. The Wolfsons' stable led all North American owners in money earned in 1978, 1979, and 1980 and was the Eclipse Award winners as top breeder in 1978.

Additionally, two of Wolfson sons, Steve and Gary, bred It's In The Air, American Co-Champion Two-Year-Old Filly in 1978, in the name of Happy Valley Farm.

Wolfson tried to buy Louisville's Churchill Downs—home of the Kentucky Derby—for $46.1 million in 1985, but was unsuccessful.

In 1992, Louis Wolfson was inducted into the Horsemen's Benevolent and Protective Association Hall of Fame. His second and final marriage was to Patrice Jacobs, daughter of Hall of Fame trainer Hirsch Jacobs and Ethel D. Jacobs.

== Personal life ==
Wolfson married twice. His first wife, Florence Monsky, died in 1968 from cancer. His second wife was Patrice Jacobs, to whom he remained married until his death. At the age of 95, Wolfson succumbed to Alzheimer's disease and colon cancer, dying on December 30, 2007, his 35th wedding anniversary, in Bal Harbour, Florida. He had four children, including son Marty.
