= Hirsch Jacobs =

American racehorse trainer and breeder

Personal information
- Born: April 8, 1904 New York City, United States
- Died: February 13, 1970 (aged 65)
- Occupation: Trainer / Breeder

Horse racing career
- Sport: Horse racing
- Career wins: 3,596 (as a trainer)

Major racing wins
- Youthful Stakes (1934, 1960); Edgemere Handicap (1936, 1946, 1955); Fashion Stakes (1938, 1944, 1962); Daingerfield Handicap (1942); Butler Handicap (1945); Saratoga Cup (1955, 1946); Whitney Handicap (1946); Empire City Gold Cup (1947); Metropolitan Handicap (1947, 1948); Massachusetts Handicap (1947, 1958); Empire City Handicap (1949); Jersey Derby (1949, 1952); Acorn Stakes (1951); Brooklyn Handicap (1951); Pimlico Special (1957); Wood Memorial Stakes (1965); Vagrancy Handicap (1955, 1965); Diana Handicap (1956, 1958); Saratoga Handicap (1956); Roamer Handicap (1957); Great American Stakes (1960); Hopeful Stakes (1960); Tremont Stakes (1960, 1962, 1967); Arcadia Handicap (1962); National Stallion Stakes (filly division) (1962); Derby Trial Stakes (1963, 1966); Vosburgh Stakes (1964); Frizette Stakes (1965, 1966); Futurity Stakes (1965, 1969); Gotham Stakes (1965); National Stallion Stakes (1965); Santa Catalina Stakes (1966); Bahamas Stakes (1967); Delaware Handicap (1967)

Racing awards
- U.S. Champion Trainer by wins (1933-1939, 1941-1944); U.S. Champion Trainer by earnings (1946, 1960, 1965); U.S. leading money-winning breeder (1964-1967)

Honours
- National Museum of Racing and Hall of Fame (1958); International Jewish Sports Hall of Fame (1979); Hirsch Jacobs Stakes at Pimlico Race Course

Significant horses
- Affectionately, Flag Raiser, Hail To Reason, Palestinian, Searching, Stymie

Hirsch Jacobs (April 8, 1904 – February 13, 1970) was an American thoroughbred horse trainer and owner.

== Early life ==
Jacobs grew up in East New York, Brooklyn in New York City. As a child he raised pigeons on the roof of his tenement building where he lived and raced them. He completed his formal schooling in elementary school at the age of 13; everything he knew about animal behavior and veterinary medicine was self-taught. An older friend, Charlie Ferraro, the brother of his boss, introduced Jacobs to horse racing when he took him to Jamaica Racetrack in Queens. Ferraro bought a horse for $1500 and asked Jacobs to train it.

== Career ==
As a youth Jacobs worked as a steamfitter's assistant, but he quit to become a "jack-of-all-trades" at the race track. On December 29, 1926, Jacobs had his first official winner, Reveillon, at Pompano, Florida. In 1927 he became a trainer with Isidor Bieber (known by nicknames "Izzy" and "Kid Beebee), who became his lifelong partner. A well-known gambler, Bieber was the inspiration for Damon Runyon's "Guys and Dolls." Bieber put up the money and Jacobs trained the horses.

Jacobs was the leading race-winning trainer in the United States from 1933 to 1939 and from 1941 to 1944, and the leading money-winning trainer in the U.S. in 1946, 1960 and 1965. He was the leading money-winning breeder in the U.S. from 1964 to 1967. During his career, he saddled 3,569 winners, more than any other until the time of his death.

In 1958, Hirsch Jacobs was inducted into the National Museum of Racing and Hall of Fame.

== Stymie ==
Stymie was Jacobs biggest success. The horse was from the large King Ranch in Texas and was well-bred, but he was not winning until Jacobs bought him. In 1943 Jacobs purchased Stymie for $1,500 in a claiming race. By the end of Stymie's 7-year-long racing career which covered over 140 miles of racing, he had a lifetime earnings of $918,485, which was more than any other horse had earned until that time. Those earnings helped Jacobs and Bieber establish a breeding farm in Maryland, Stymie Manor.

== Family racing business ==
Hirsch Jacobs and his wife Ethel owned a number of horses which were raced under her name. In 1970, the Jacobs family won two of the U.S. Triple Crown races, capturing the Preakness and Belmont Stakes. They won the Preakness with Personality, who earned American Horse of the Year honors, and the Belmont with High Echelon. Both horses were owned by Ethel Jacobs and trained by their son, John. Their daughter, Patrice, became involved in the sport. She married Louis Wolfson and their Harbor View Farm owned and bred the 1978 American Triple Crown champion, Affirmed.

== Personal ==
Hirsch Jacobs had a daughter, Patrice, and two sons, John and Tom. He had five brothers, Harry, Irving, Albert, Sidney, and Eugene, and four sisters, Mrs. Irene Robbins, Miss Helen Jacobs, Mrs. Florence Jacobson and Mrs. Lillian Gold. His brothers Sidney and Eugene both became trainers.

Hirsch Jacobs died in 1970 in Miami Beach, Florida of a cerebral hemorrhage. He was buried at Gate of Heaven Cemetery in Valhalla, New York. He married Ethel Dushock in 1933. He had lived with his wife in Forest Hills, Queens.

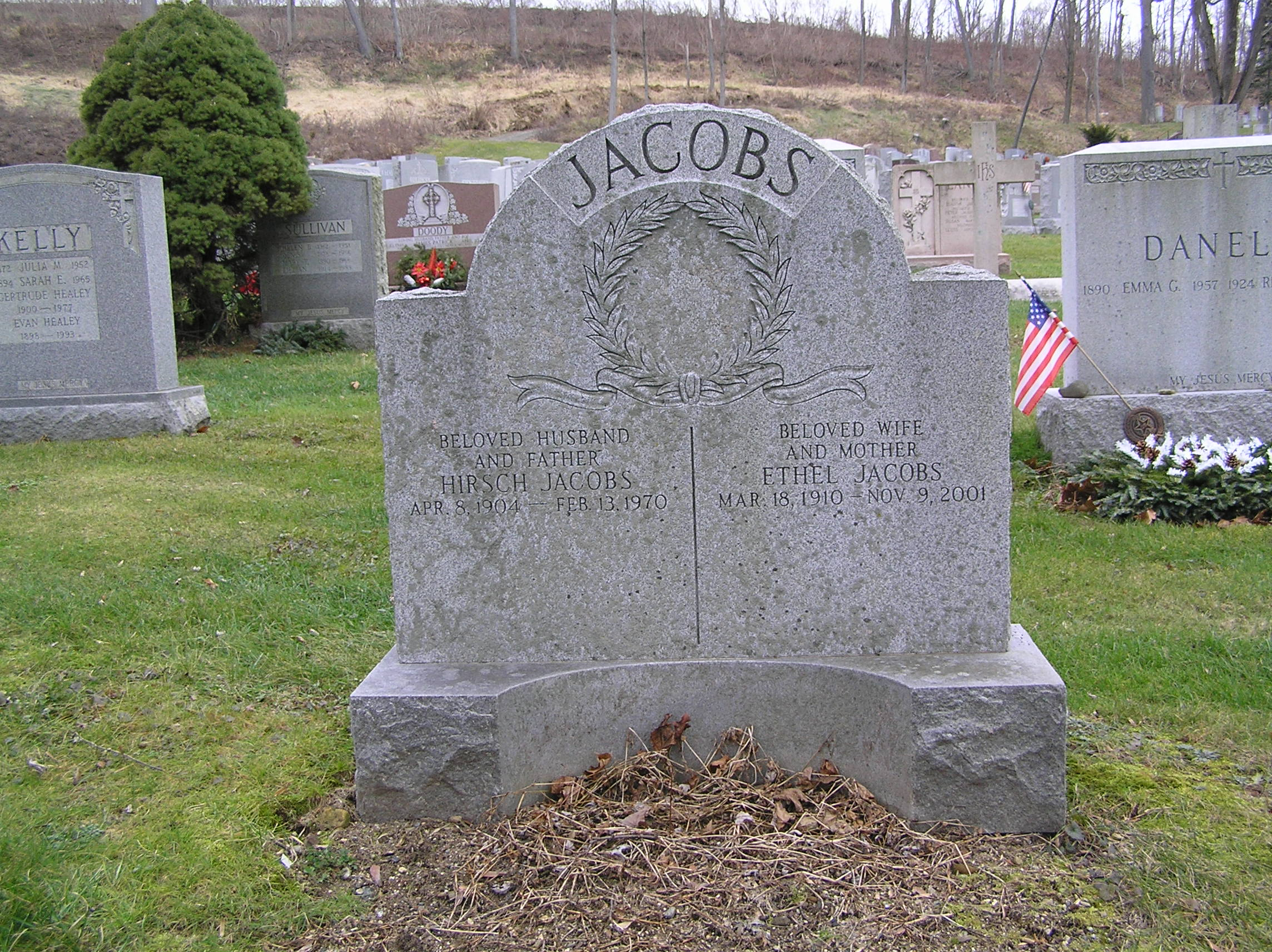
The tombstone of Hirsch and Ethel Jacobs in Gate of Heaven Cemetery

== Sources ==
- Hirsch Jacobs at the United States' National Museum of Racing and Hall of Fame
- Bowen, Edward L. Masters of the Turf: Ten Trainers Who Dominated Horse Racing's Golden Age (2007) Eclipse Press (ISBN 978-1581501490)
- June 26, 1961 Sports Illustrated feature story on the Jacobs family
