= Kiaran McLaughlin =

American Thoroughbred racehorse trainer (born 1960)

Personal information
- Born: November 15, 1960 (age 65) Lexington, Kentucky, U.S.
- Occupation: Trainer

Horse racing career
- Sport: Horse racing
- Career wins: 1,557 (Note: Career wins from Equibase include North America only)

Major racing wins
- Shadwell Turf Mile (1995, 1996, 2000); Lexington Stakes (2003, 2004); Man o' War Stakes (2003); Affectionately Stakes (2005); Pimlico Special (2006); Suburban Handicap (2006); Vosburgh Stakes (2006); Whitney Handicap (2006, 2016); Donn Handicap (2007, 2009); Flower Bowl Invitational (2007); Gazelle Stakes (2007, 2012); Stephen Foster Handicap (2007); Cigar Mile Handicap (2007); Ashland Stakes (2008); Metropolitan Handicap (2008, 2016); Queen Elizabeth II Challenge Cup (2008); Apple Blossom Handicap (2009); Acorn Stakes (2011); Coaching Club American Oaks (2011, 2012); Ogden Phipps Handicap (2012, 2015); Forego Stakes (2012); Alabama Stakes (2012); Travers Stakes (2012); Woodward Stakes (2013); Test Stakes (2015); Beldame Stakes (2015); Wood Memorial (2015); Ogden Phipps Stakes (2016); Personal Ensign Stakes (2016); Metropolitan Handicap (2016); Woodward Stakes (2016) International Stakes Wins: Keio Hai Spring Cup (1995); Dubai Golden Shaheen (1997); E. P. Taylor Stakes (2003); Dubai World Cup (2007); Woodbine Mile (2007) American Classics wins: Belmont Stakes (2006) Breeders' Cup wins: Breeders' Cup Classic (2006); Breeders' Cup Filly & Mare Turf (2007); Breeders' Cup Dirt Mile (2016)

Racing awards
- C.V. Whitney Achievement Award (2006); Co-Red Smith "Good Guy" Award

Significant horses
- Frosted, Henny Hughes, It's Tricky, Jazil, Jess's Dream, Invasor, Lahudood, Mohaymen, Questing, Tamarkuz
- Updated on February 6, 2007

Kiaran P. McLaughlin (born November 15, 1960) is an American Thoroughbred racehorse trainer best known for training 2006 Horse of the Year Invasor.

== Background ==
McLaughlin was born in an area of the country where horse racing and breeding is preeminent. One of his childhood friends was the son of trainer James Burchell and his first job was as a hotwalker. He was a student at the University of Kentucky for a year before he decided focus on pursuing a career in the Thoroughbred horse racing industry. He spent close to three years as an assistant for various trainers before going to work for U.S. Racing Hall of Fame trainer, D. Wayne Lukas in 1985. In 1992 he became the agent for jockey Chris Antley, a job he held until November 1993 when he signed on as the trainer for Sheikh Mohammed bin Rashid Al Maktoum in Dubai. He was leading trainer in Dubai three times and has campaigned multiple graded stakes winners.

In 1998, Kiaran McLaughlin was diagnosed with Multiple sclerosis.

Kiaran McLaughlin, his wife and their two children currently reside in Garden City on Long Island, New York. He is famously quoted for saying: "My first job in life is to be a parent."

Kiaran's eldest daughter, Rachel, is currently the thoroughbred racing analyst at Indiana Downs

== Career ==
For ten years, Kiaran McLaughlin spent half of each year working in Dubai and half in the New York City area. In both locations he trained horses for Sheikh Mohammed and his brother, Sheikh Hamdan. He was the leading trainer at Dubai's Nad Al Sheba Racecourse on three occasions: 1994–95, 1995–96 and 2002–2003. In 1995, he shipped Dumaani to Japan and won the $1.5 million Keio Hai Spring Cup at Tokyo Racecourse at odds of 56–1.

McLaughlin returned to the U.S. permanently in 2003 and opened a public stable in New York. Among his clients are Sheikh Mohammed's Godolphin Racing and Sheikh Hamden's Shadwell Racing. McLaughlin won his first Grade I race in 2003 with Lunar Sovereign in the Man o' War Stakes. In 2006, he trained Shadwell's colt Jazil, who won the Belmont Stakes, and had enormous success with Invasor, Shadwell's newly acquired four-year-old Argentinian colt. Invasor won several Grade I races in the U.S. including the Breeders' Cup Classic, for which he earned U.S. Horse of the Year honors and the number 1 World Thoroughbred Racehorse Ranking. McLaughlin's 2006 season earned him the New York Turf Writers Association (NYTWA) C.V. Whitney Achievement Award and a share of the Red Smith "Good Guy" Award with fellow trainer Tom Albertrani.

In March 2007, Invasor won the world's richest horse race, the Dubai World Cup with Invasor. Also in 2007, McLaughlin trained Lahudood to victories in the Flower Bowl Invitational and the Breeders' Cup Filly and Mare Turf, for which she earned the Eclipse Award for Outstanding Turf Mare.

On March 12, 2012, McLaughlin earned his 1,000th North American career win at Aqueduct Racetrack with Que Posse. Later that year at Saratoga, McLaughlin scored Grade I victories with Emcee in the Forego Stakes, Alpha in the Travers Stakes and Questing in both the Coaching Club American Oaks and Alabama Stakes. Questing would be named champion three-year-old filly.

In 2015, McLaughlin trained Frosted, owned by his oldest client Sheikh Mohammed, to victories in the Wood Memorial and Pennsylvania Derby, also finishing second to American Pharoah in the Belmont Stakes. The following year, Frosted won the Met Mile at Belmont and the Whitney in Saratoga.

The Daily Racing Form reported in March 2020 that McLaughlin, who had ended his training operations in New York a few months prior, would stop training horses in April and become a jockey agent once again, representing Luis Saez.

== Year-end rankings ==
Trainer rank (2003–present)	By earnings
2003	33
2004	15
2005	20
2006	5
2007	8
2008	8
2009	6
2010	11
2011	15
2012	11
2013	13
2014	18
2015	8
