= Ethel D. Jacobs =

American racehorse owner and breeder

Ethel Jacobs
- Born: March 18, 1910; Yonkers, New York; United States
- Died: November 9, 2001 (aged 91); Miami Beach, Florida; United States
- Resting place: Gate of Heaven Cemetery, Valhalla, New York
- Occupation: Thoroughbred racehorse owner/breeder
- Spouse: Hirsch Jacobs
- Children: John William; Patrice; Thomas E.W.

Ethel D. Jacobs (March 18, 1910 - November 9, 2001) was a prominent American Thoroughbred racehorse owner/breeder who was a three-time leading owner in North America.

Married to U.S. Racing Hall of Fame trainer Hirsch Jacobs, Ethel Jacobs used salmon pink and green racing silks. She and her husband owned Stymie Manor, a horse breeding operation in Sparks, Maryland. She owned and raced a number of successful horses trained by her husband and her son. Ethel Jacobs was the leading owner in North America in 1936, 1937, and 1943. Among her notable horses were:

- Stymie - 1975 United States' Racing Hall of Fame, retired as the world's leading money-earner
- Searching - 1978 United States' Racing Hall of Fame
- Affectionately - 1989 United States' Racing Hall of Fame
- Personality, won the 1970 Preakness Stakes, voted American Horse of the Year
- High Echelon, won the 1970 Belmont Stakes

== A racing family ==
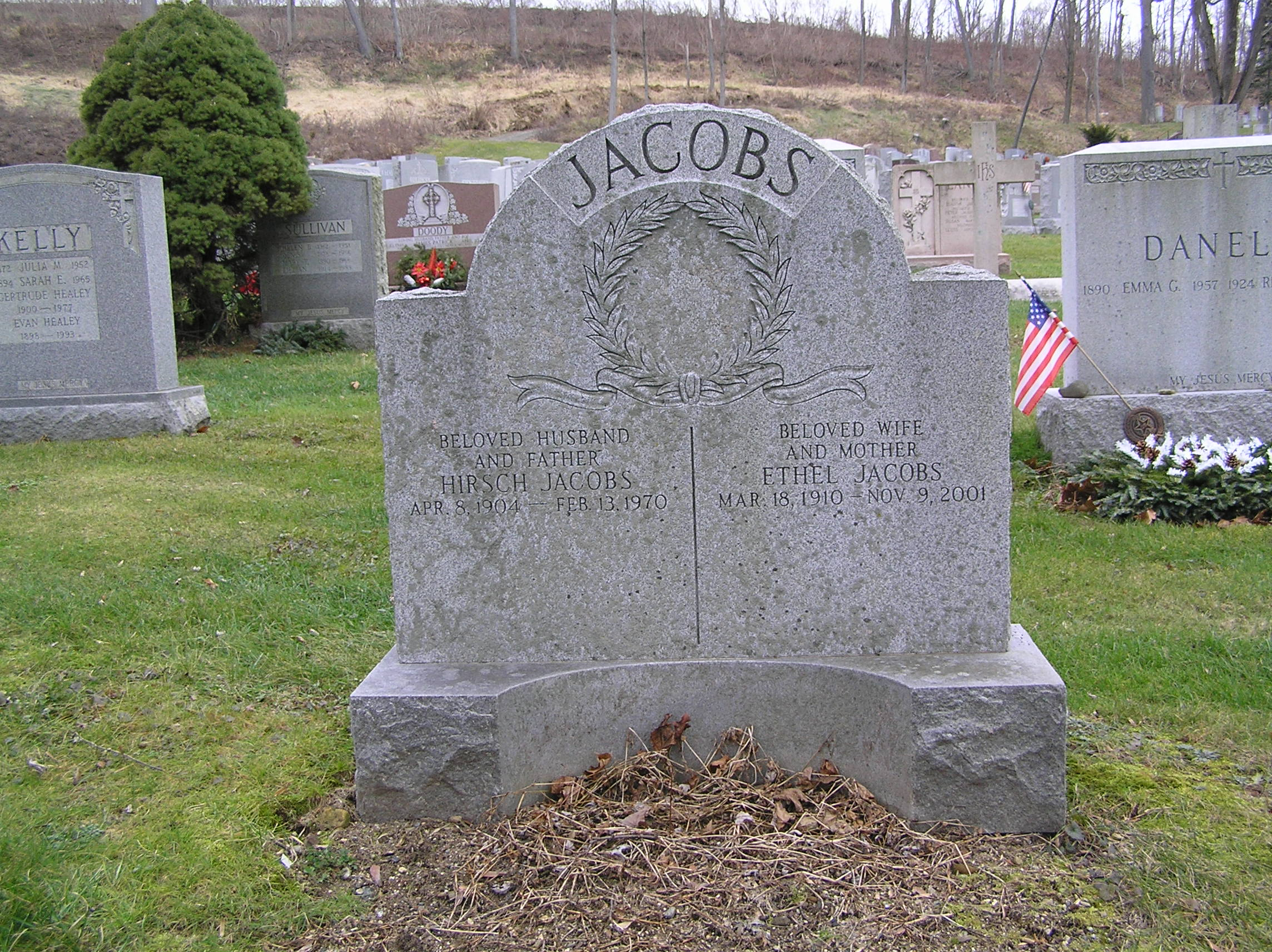
The tombstone of Ethel Jacobs in Gate of Heaven Cemetery

The Jacobses' son, John, trained horses including Personality and High Echelon. Son Thomas also bred horses, and daughter Patrice married Louis Wolfson. They owned Hail To Reason and the 1978 U.S. Triple Crown champion Affirmed.

Ethel and Hirsch Jacobs maintained homes in Forest Hills, Queens, and Bal Harbour, Florida. She died in 2001 of pneumonia at Mt. Sinai Hospital in Miami Beach at age 91 and was buried in the Gate of Heaven Cemetery, Hawthorne, New York.

== Sources ==
- June 26, 1961 Sports Illustrated feature story on the Jacobs family
- "Paid Notice: Deaths JACOBS, ETHEL D." The New York Times. November 11, 2001.
- November 10, 2001 Thoroughbred Times article titled Owner Ethel Jacobs dies in Florida at 91
