= 2009 World Thoroughbred Rankings =

The 2009 World Thoroughbred Rankings was the 2009 edition of the World Thoroughbred Rankings. It was an assessment of Thoroughbred racehorses issued by the International Federation of Horseracing Authorities (IFHA) in January 2010. It included horses aged three or older which competed in flat races during 2009. It was open to all horses irrespective of where they raced or were trained.

This year's highest rating was awarded to Sea the Stars for his performance in the Irish Champion Stakes. He was given a rating of 136. A total of 333 horses were included in the list, 45 more than the previous year.

== Full rankings for 2009 ==
- For a detailed guide to this table, see below.

Rank	Rating	Horse	Age	Sex	Trained	Pos.	Race	Surface	Dist.	Cat.
1	136	Sea the Stars (IRE)	3	C	IRE	1st	Irish Champion Stakes	Turf	2,012	I
	131	Sea the Stars (IRE)	3	C	IRE	1st	Prix de l'Arc de Triomphe	Turf	2,400	L
2	130	Goldikova (IRE)	4	F	FR	1st	Prix Jacques Le Marois	Turf	1,600	M
3	129	Rip Van Winkle (IRE)	3	C	IRE	2nd 1st	Eclipse Stakes; Sussex Stakes	Turf; Turf	2,018; 1,609	I M
4	128	Fame and Glory (GB)	3	C	IRE	1st 2nd	Irish Derby; Irish Champion Stakes	Turf; Turf	2,414; 2,012	L I
4	128	Zenyatta (USA)	5	M	USA	1st 1st	Milady Handicap; Breeders' Cup Classic	Artificial; Artificial	1,710; 2,012	M I
6	127	Rachel Alexandra (USA)	3	F	USA	1st 1st 1st	Kentucky Oaks; Mother Goose Stakes; Haskell Invitational Stakes	Dirt; Dirt; Dirt	1,811; 1,811; 1,811	M M M
7	125	Cavalryman (GB)	3	C	FR	3rd	Prix de l'Arc de Triomphe	Turf	2,400	L
7	125	Conduit (IRE)	4	C	GB	1st 4th 1st	King George VI and Queen Elizabeth S. Prix de l'Arc de Triomphe; Breeders' Cup Turf	Turf; Turf; Turf	2,414; 2,400; 2,414	L L L
7	125	Gio Ponti (USA)	4	C	USA	2nd	Breeders' Cup Classic	Artificial	2,012	I
7	125	Gladiatorus (USA)	4	C	UAE	1st	Dubai Duty Free	Turf	1,777	M
7	125	Youmzain (IRE)	6	H	GB	2nd	Prix de l'Arc de Triomphe	Turf	2,400	L
12	124	Mastercraftsman (IRE)	3	C	IRE	2nd 3rd	International Stakes; Irish Champion Stakes	Turf; Turf	2,092; 2,012	I I
12	124	Paco Boy (IRE)	4	C	GB	2nd	Sussex Stakes	Turf	1,609	M
12	124	Well Armed (USA)	6	G	USA	1st	Dubai World Cup	Dirt	2,000	I
15	123	Presious Passion (USA)	6	G	USA	2nd	Breeders' Cup Turf	Turf	2,414	L
15	123	Summer Bird (USA)	3	C	USA	1st 1st	Travers Stakes; Jockey Club Gold Cup	Dirt; Dirt	2,012; 2,012	I I
15	123	Twice Over (GB)	4	C	GB	3rd	Breeders' Cup Classic	Artificial	2,012	I
15	123	Vision d'Etat (FR)	4	C	FR	1st	Hong Kong Cup	Turf	2,000	I
19	122	Company (JPN)	8	H	JPN	1st	Tenno Sho (Autumn)	Turf	2,000	I
19	122	Courageous Cat (USA)	3	C	USA	2nd	Breeders' Cup Mile	Turf	1,609	M
19	122	Dream Journey (JPN)	5	H	JPN	1st	Arima Kinen	Turf	2,500	L
19	122	Getaway (GER)	6	H	GER	1st	Grosser Preis von Baden	Turf	2,400	L
19	122	Good Ba Ba (USA)	7	G	HK	1st 1st	Stewards' Cup; Hong Kong Mile	Turf; Turf	1,600; 1,600	M M
19	122	Mine That Bird (USA)	3	G	USA	1st 2nd	Kentucky Derby; Preakness Stakes	Dirt; Dirt	2,012; 1,911	I I
19	122	Sacred Kingdom (AUS)	5	G	HK	1st	KrisFlyer International Sprint	Turf	1,200	S
19	122	Scenic Blast (AUS)	4	G	AUS	1st 1st	Newmarket Handicap; King's Stand Stakes	Turf; Turf	1,200; 1,006	S S
19	122	So You Think (NZ)	3	C	AUS	1st 2nd	W. S. Cox Plate; Emirates Stakes	Turf; Turf	2,040; 1,600	I M
19	122	Stacelita (FR)	3	F	FR	1st	Prix de Diane	Turf	2,100	I
19	122	Tartan Bearer (IRE)	4	C	GB	2nd	King George VI and Queen Elizabeth S.	Turf	2,414	L
19	122	Viewed (AUS)	6	H	AUS	1st	Caulfield Cup	Turf	2,400	L
19	122	Yeats (IRE)	8	H	IRE	1st	Ascot Gold Cup	Turf	4,023	E
19	122	Zacinto (GB)	3	C	GB	2nd	Queen Elizabeth II Stakes	Turf	1,609	M
33	121	Ask (GB)	6	H	GB	3rd	King George VI and Queen Elizabeth S.	Turf	2,414	L
33	121	Casual Conquest (IRE)	4	G	IRE	1st 1st	Tattersalls Gold Cup; Royal Whip Stakes	Turf; Turf	2,112; 2,012	I I
33	121	Delegator (GB)	3	C	GB	2nd	St. James's Palace Stakes	Turf	1,609	M
	121	Mastercraftsman (IRE)	3	C	IRE	1st	Diamond Stakes	Artificial	2,149	L
33	121	Mawatheeq (USA)	4	C	GB	2nd	Champion Stakes	Turf	2,012	I
33	121	Musket Man (USA)	3	C	USA	3rd	Preakness Stakes	Dirt	1,911	I
33	121	Oken Bruce Lee (JPN)	4	C	JPN	2nd	Japan Cup	Turf	2,400	L
33	121	Pocket Power (SAF)	6	G	SAF	1st	J&B Met	Turf	2,000	I
33	121	Quality Road (USA)	3	C	USA	2nd	Jockey Club Gold Cup	Dirt	2,012	I
33	121	Rocket Man (AUS)	3	G	SIN	2nd	KrisFlyer International Sprint	Turf	1,200	S
	121	Summer Bird (USA)	3	C	USA	1st	Belmont Stakes	Dirt	2,414	L
33	121	Varenar (FR)	3	C	FR	1st	Prix de la Forêt	Turf	1,400	M
43	120	Aqlaam (GB)	4	C	GB	2nd 1st	Prix Jacques Le Marois; Prix du Moulin de Longchamp	Turf; Turf	1,600; 1,600	M M
43	120	Collection (IRE)	4	G	HK	2nd	Hong Kong Cup	Turf	2,000	I
43	120	Court Vision (USA)	4	C	USA	4th	Breeders' Cup Mile	Turf	1,609	M
43	120	Dar Re Mi (GB)	4	F	GB	5th	Prix de l'Arc de Triomphe	Turf	2,400	L
43	120	Deep Sky (JPN)	4	C	JPN	2nd	Osaka Hai	Turf	2,000	I
43	120	Einstein (BRZ)	6	H	USA	1st	Santa Anita Handicap	Artificial	2,012	I
43	120	Fabulous Strike (USA)	6	G	USA	2nd	Carter Handicap	Dirt	1,408	S
43	120	Gitano Hernando (GB)	3	C	GB	1st	Goodwood Stakes (USA)	Artificial	1,811	M
43	120	Gloria de Campeao (BRZ)	5	H	FR	1st	Singapore Airlines International Cup	Turf	2,000	I
43	120	Justenuffhumor (USA)	4	C	USA	3rd	Breeders' Cup Mile	Turf	1,609	M
43	120	Kodiak Kowboy (USA)	4	C	USA	1st	Vosburgh Stakes	Dirt	1,207	S
43	120	Le Havre (IRE)	3	C	FR	1st	Prix du Jockey Club	Turf	2,100	I
43	120	Midday (GB)	3	F	GB	1st	Breeders' Cup Filly & Mare Turf	Turf	2,012	I
43	120	Never on Sunday (FR)	4	C	FR	3rd	Prince of Wales's Stakes	Turf	2,012	I
43	120	Presvis (GB)	5	G	GB	1st	QE II Cup	Turf	2,000	I
43	120	Sariska (GB)	3	F	GB	1st	Irish Oaks	Turf	2,414	L
43	120	Silver Frost (IRE)	3	C	FR	1st	Poule d'Essai des Poulains	Turf	1,600	M
43	120	Spanish Moon (USA)	5	H	GB	1st	Grand Prix de Saint-Cloud	Turf	2,400	L
43	120	Viva Pataca (GB)	7	G	HK	4th	Sha Tin Trophy	Turf	1,600	M
43	120	Vodka (JPN)	5	M	JPN	1st 1st	Victoria Mile; Yasuda Kinen	Turf; Turf	1,600; 1,600	M M
43	120	Whobegotyou (AUS)	4	G	AUS	1st 1st	Dato Tan Chin Nam Stakes; Yalumba Stakes	Turf; Turf	1,600; 2,000	M I
43	120	Wiener Walzer (GER)	3	C	GER	1st	Rheinland-Pokal	Turf	2,400	L
65	119	Alandi (IRE)	4	C	IRE	1st	Prix du Cadran	Turf	4,000	E
65	119	Albertus Maximus (USA)	5	H	USA	1st	Donn Handicap	Dirt	1,811	M
65	119	All Silent (AUS)	6	G	AUS	1st	Patinack Farm Classic	Turf	1,200	S
65	119	Apache Cat (AUS)	6	G	AUS	1st	Australia Stakes	Turf	1,200	S
65	119	Big City Man (USA)	4	C	KSA	1st	Dubai Golden Shaheen	Dirt	1,200	S
65	119	Bronze Cannon (USA)	4	C	GB	1st	Hardwicke Stakes	Turf	2,414	L
65	119	Careless Jewel (USA)	3	F	USA	1st 1st	Alabama Stakes; Cotillion Stakes	Dirt; Dirt	2,012; 1,710	I M
65	119	Champs Elysees (GB)	6	H	USA	1st	Canadian International	Turf	2,414	L
65	119	Colonel John (USA)	4	C	USA	2nd 5th	Goodwood Stakes (USA); Breeders' Cup Classic	Artificial; Artificial	1,811; 2,012	M I
65	119	Egyptian Ra (NZ)	7	G	HK	1st	Queen's Silver Jubilee Cup	Turf	1,400	M
65	119	Golden Sword (GB)	3	C	IRE	5th	Epsom Derby	Turf	2,423	L
65	119	Happy Zero (AUS)	5	G	HK	1st	International Sprint Trial	Turf	1,200	S
65	119	Life Is Sweet (USA)	4	F	USA	1st	Breeders' Cup Ladies' Classic	Artificial	1,811	M
65	119	Macho Again (USA)	4	C	USA	2nd	Woodward Stakes	Dirt	1,811	M
65	119	Masterofthehorse (IRE)	3	C	IRE	3rd	Epsom Derby	Turf	2,423	L
65	119	Matsurida Gogh (JPN)	6	H	JPN	1st	All Comers	Turf	2,200	L
	119	Quality Road (USA)	3	C	USA	1st	Amsterdam Stakes	Dirt	1,308	S
65	119	Quijano (GER)	7	G	GER	2nd	Northern Dancer Turf Stakes	Turf	2,414	L
65	119	Richard's Kid (USA)	4	C	USA	1st	Pacific Classic Stakes	Artificial	2,012	I
65	119	Screen Hero (JPN)	5	H	JPN	2nd	Tenno Sho (Autumn)	Turf	2,000	I
65	119	Shalanaya (IRE)	3	F	FR	1st	Prix de l'Opéra	Turf	2,000	I
65	119	Takeover Target (AUS)	9	G	AUS	1st 1st	T. J. Smith Stakes; Goodwood Stakes (AUS)	Turf; Turf	1,200; 1,200	S S
65	119	Zensational (USA)	3	C	USA	1st	Pat O'Brien Stakes	Artificial	1,408	S
87	118	Archipenko (USA)	5	H	UAE	1st	Zabeel Mile	Turf	1,600	M
87	118	California Flag (USA)	5	G	USA	1st	Breeders' Cup Turf Sprint	Turf	1,308	S
87	118	Cesare (GB)	8	G	GB	2nd	Queen Anne Stakes	Turf	1,609	M
87	118	Efficient (NZ)	6	G	AUS	1st	Turnbull Stakes	Turf	2,000	I
87	118	Espoir City (JPN)	4	C	JPN	1st	Japan Cup Dirt	Dirt	1,800	M
87	118	Fellowship (NZ)	7	G	HK	3rd	Hong Kong Mile	Turf	1,600	M
87	118	Fleeting Spirit (IRE)	4	F	GB	1st	July Cup	Turf	1,207	S
87	118	Ghanaati (USA)	3	F	GB	1st	Coronation Stakes	Turf	1,609	M
87	118	Heart of Dreams (AUS)	4	G	AUS	1st 2nd	Underwood Stakes; Yalumba Stakes	Turf; Turf	1,800; 2,000	M I
87	118	Icon Project (USA)	4	F	USA	1st	Personal Ensign Stakes	Dirt	2,012	I
87	118	Informed Decision (USA)	4	F	USA	1st	Breeders' Cup Filly & Mare Sprint	Artificial	1,408	S
87	118	Jaguar Mail (JPN)	5	H	JPN	4th	Hong Kong Vase	Turf	2,400	L
87	118	Jukebox Jury (IRE)	3	C	GB	1st 2nd	Preis von Europa; Canadian International	Turf; Turf	2,400; 2,414	L L
87	118	Kasbah Bliss (FR)	7	G	FR	2nd 3rd	Prix du Cadran; Hong Kong Vase	Turf; Turf	4,000; 2,400	E L
87	118	Kingsgate Native (IRE)	4	C	GB	1st	King George Stakes	Turf	1,006	S
87	118	Logi Universe (JPN)	3	C	JPN	1st	Tokyo Yushun	Turf	2,400	L
87	118	Lord Shanakill (USA)	3	C	GB	3rd 1st	St. James's Palace Stakes; Prix Jean Prat	Turf; Turf	1,609; 1,600	M M
87	118	Maldivian (NZ)	6; 7	G	AUS	1st 4th	C. F. Orr Stakes; Turnbull Stakes	Turf; Turf	1,400; 2,000	M I
87	118	Music Note (USA)	4	F	USA	1st 1st	Ballerina Stakes; Beldame Stakes	Dirt; Dirt	1,408; 1,811	S M
87	118	One World (AUS)	5	H	HK	2nd	Hong Kong Sprint	Turf	1,200	S
87	118	Pipedreamer (GB)	5	H	GB	1st	Prix Dollar	Turf	1,950	I
87	118	Pure Clan (USA)	4	F	USA	1st 1st 2nd	Modesty Handicap; Flower Bowl Invitational Stakes; Breeders' Cup Filly & Mare Turf	Turf; Turf; Turf	1,911; 2,012; 2,012	I I I
87	118	Racing to Win (AUS)	7	G	AUS	1st	Theo Marks Stakes	Turf	1,400	M
87	118	Regal Parade (GB)	5	G	GB	1st	Haydock Sprint Cup	Turf	1,207	S
87	118	Sahpresa (USA)	4	F	FR	1st	Sun Chariot Stakes	Turf	1,609	M
87	118	Sakura Mega Wonder (JPN)	6	H	JPN	2nd	Takarazuka Kinen	Turf	2,200	L
87	118	Scenic Shot (AUS)	7	G	AUS	3rd 1st	Turnbull Stakes; Mackinnon Stakes	Turf; Turf	2,000; 2,000	I I
87	118	Total Gallery (IRE)	3	C	GB	1st	Prix de l'Abbaye de Longchamp	Turf	1,000	S
87	118	Trincot (FR)	4	C	FR	1st	Prix d'Harcourt	Turf	2,000	I
87	118	Typhoon Tracy (AUS)	4	F	AUS	1st	Myer Classic	Turf	1,600	M
87	118	Ventura (USA)	5	M	USA	1st 1st 1st	Santa Monica Handicap; Woodbine Mile; Matriarch Stakes	Artificial; Turf; Turf	1,408; 1,609; 1,609	S M M
118	117	Adlerflug (GER)	5	H	GER	3rd	Prix Ganay	Turf	2,100	I
118	117	Age of Aquarius (IRE)	3	C	IRE	2nd	Grand Prix de Paris	Turf	2,400	L
118	117	Alamosa (NZ)	4	C	AUS	2nd	C. F. Orr Stakes	Turf	1,400	M
118	117	Alwaary (USA)	3	C	GB	4th	King George VI and Queen Elizabeth S.	Turf	2,414	L
118	117	Art Connoisseur (IRE)	3	C	GB	1st	Golden Jubilee Stakes	Turf	1,207	S
118	117	Asiatic Boy (ARG)	5	H	UAE	1st 2nd	Al Maktoum Challenge R3; Stephen Foster Handicap	Dirt; Dirt	2,000; 1,811	I M
118	117	Blame (USA)	3	C	USA	1st 1st	Fayette Stakes; Clark Handicap	Artificial; Dirt	1,811; 1,811	M M
118	117	Buena Vista (JPN)	3	F	JPN	2nd	Arima Kinen	Turf	2,500	L
118	117	Cirrus des Aigles (FR)	3	G	FR	1st 5th	Prix du Conseil de Paris; Hong Kong Vase	Turf; Turf	2,400; 2,400	L L
118	117	City Leader (IRE)	4	C	GB	5th	Champion Stakes	Turf	2,012	I
118	117	Cowboy Cal (USA)	4	C	USA	2nd 2nd 1st	Turf Classic Stakes; Bernard Baruch Handicap; Oak Tree Mile	Turf; Turf; Turf	1,811; 1,811; 1,609	M M M
118	117	Danleigh (AUS)	5; 6	G	AUS	2nd 1st	Stradbroke Handicap; Manikato Stakes	Turf; Turf	1,400; 1,200	M S
118	117	Daryakana (FR)	3	F	FR	1st	Hong Kong Vase	Turf	2,400	L
118	117	Duncan (GB)	4	C	GB	4th	Coronation Cup	Turf	2,423	L
118	117	Dunkirk (USA)	3	C	USA	2nd	Belmont Stakes	Dirt	2,414	L
118	117	Eastern Anthem (IRE)	5	H	UAE; GB; GB	1st 2nd 2nd	Dubai Sheema Classic; Grosser Preis von Baden; Preis von Europa	Turf; Turf; Turf	2,400; 2,400; 2,400	L L L
118	117	Elusive Wave (IRE)	3	F	FR	1st 2nd	Poule d'Essai des Pouliches; Prix Rothschild	Turf; Turf	1,600; 1,600	M M
118	117	Famous Name (GB)	4	C	IRE	1st 2nd 3rd	Desmond Stakes; Prix du Moulin de Longchamp; Prix Dollar	Turf; Turf; Turf	1,609; 1,600; 1,950	M M I
118	117	Faridat (USA)	4	C	JPN	3rd	Yasuda Kinen	Turf	1,600	M
118	117	Finjaan (GB)	3	C	GB	1st	Lennox Stakes	Turf	1,408	M
118	117	Forever Together (USA)	5	M	USA	1st 2nd	Diana Stakes; Canadian Stakes	Turf; Turf	1,811; 1,811	M M
118	117	Fuisse (FR)	3	C	FR	2nd	Prix du Jockey Club	Turf	2,100	I
118	117	Gan Amhras (IRE)	3	C	IRE	3rd	2,000 Guineas Stakes	Turf	1,609	M
118	117	Geordieland (FR)	8	H	GB	1st	Henry II Stakes	Turf	3,290	E
118	117	Grand Couturier (GB)	6	H	USA	1st	Bowling Green Handicap	Turf	2,213	L
118	117	Gris de Gris (IRE)	5	H	FR	2nd 1st	Prix Dollar; Grand Prix de Marseille	Turf; Turf	1,950; 2,000	I I
118	117	I Want Revenge (USA)	3	C	USA	1st	Wood Memorial Stakes	Dirt	1,811	M
118	117	J J the Jet Plane (SAF)	4	G	UAE; GB; GB	1st 1st 3rd	Al Quoz Sprint; Leisure Stakes; July Cup	Turf; Turf; Turf	1,200; 1,207; 1,207	S S S
118	117	Joy and Fun (NZ)	6	G	HK	3rd	Hong Kong Sprint	Turf	1,200	S
118	117	Kip Deville (USA)	6	H	USA	1st	Gulfstream Park Turf Handicap	Turf	1,811	M
118	117	Loup Breton (IRE)	5	H	FR	2nd	Prix Ganay	Turf	2,100	I
118	117	Lucky Secret (AUS)	6	G	AUS	1st	Schillaci Stakes	Turf	1,000	S
118	117	Main Aim (GB)	4	C	GB	2nd	July Cup	Turf	1,207	S
118	117	Marsh Side (USA)	6	H	USA	4th	Northern Dancer Turf Stakes	Turf	2,414	L
118	117	Mastery (GB)	3	C	GB	1st	St. Leger Stakes	Turf	2,937	E
118	117	Meiner Kitz (JPN)	6	H	JPN	1st	Tenno Sho (Spring)	Turf	3,200	E
118	117	Mic Mac (AUS)	4	G	AUS	1st 2nd	Memsie Stakes; Dato Tan Chin Nam Stakes	Turf; Turf	1,400; 1,600	M M
118	117	Monterey Jazz (USA)	5	H	USA	1st	American Handicap	Turf	1,811	M
118	117	Mourayan (IRE)	3	C	IRE	3rd	Irish Derby	Turf	2,414	L
118	117	Oiseau de Feu (USA)	3	C	FR	2nd	Prix Jean Prat	Turf	1,600	M
118	117	Patkai (IRE)	4	C	GB	2nd	Ascot Gold Cup	Turf	4,023	E
118	117	Predatory Pricer (AUS)	4	C	AUS	3rd	Underwood Stakes	Turf	1,800	M
118	117	Pressing (IRE)	6	H	GB	1st	Bayerisches Zuchtrennen	Turf	2,000	I
118	117	Rahy's Attorney (CAN)	5	G	CAN	1st	Nijinsky Stakes	Turf	2,012	I
118	117	Rail Trip (USA)	4	G	USA	1st 3rd	Hollywood Gold Cup; Pacific Classic Stakes	Artificial; Artificial	2,012; 2,012	I I
118	117	Schiaparelli (GER)	6	H	GB	1st 2nd	Gran Premio del Jockey Club; Prix Royal-Oak	Turf; Turf	2,400; 3,100	L E
118	117	Sight Winner (NZ)	5; 6	G	HK	1st 2nd	Champions Mile; International Mile Trial	Turf; Turf	1,600; 1,600	M M
118	117	Starspangledbanner (AUS)	3	C	AUS	1st	Caulfield Guineas	Turf	1,600	M
118	117	Success Brocken (JPN)	4	C	JPN	1st	February Stakes	Dirt	1,600	M
118	117	Sweet Hearth (USA)	3	F	FR	2nd	Prix de la Forêt	Turf	1,400	M
118	117	Swiss Ace (AUS)	4	C	AUS	2nd 4th 1st	Newmarket Handicap; The Galaxy; Sir Byrne Hart Stakes	Turf; Turf; Turf	1,200; 1,100; 1,200	S S S
118	117	Thumbs Up (NZ)	4	G	HK	3rd 2nd	QE II Cup; Champions & Chater Cup	Turf; Turf	2,000; 2,400	I L
118	117	Vermilion (JPN)	7	H	JPN	1st	Teio Sho	Dirt	2,000	I
118	117	Vigor (NZ)	5	G	AUS	1st	Makybe Diva Stakes	Turf	1,600	M
118	117	Vineyard Haven (USA)	3	C	USA	3rd	Cigar Mile Handicap	Dirt	1,609	M
118	117	Voila Ici (IRE)	4	C	ITY	1st	Premio Roma	Turf	2,000	I
118	117	Wajir (FR)	3	C	FR	1st	Prix de Lutèce	Turf	3,000	E
175	116	Al Nasrain (JPN)	5	H	JPN	2nd 6th	Tenno Sho (Spring); Takarazuka Kinen	Turf; Turf	3,200; 2,200	E L
175	116	Antara (GER)	3	F	GER	1st	Preis der Deutschen Einheit	Turf	2,000	I
175	116	Bank Robber (AUS)	5	G	AUS	3rd 3rd	Schweppes Stakes; Patinack Farm Classic	Turf; Turf	1,200; 1,200	S S
175	116	Benny the Bull (USA)	6	H	USA	2nd	True North Handicap	Dirt	1,207	S
175	116	Black Piranha (AUS)	5; 5; 6; 6	G	AUS	2nd 1st 2nd 2nd	Doomben 10,000; Stradbroke Handicap; Cameron Handicap; George Main Stakes	Turf; Turf; Turf; Turf	1,350; 1,400; 1,300; 1,600	M M S M
175	116	Board Meeting (IRE)	3	F	FR	2nd	Prix de l'Opéra	Turf	2,000	I
175	116	Borderlescott (GB)	7	G	GB	1st	Nunthorpe Stakes	Turf	1,006	S
175	116	Bribon (FR)	6	G	USA	1st 2nd	Metropolitan Handicap; Cigar Mile Handicap	Dirt; Dirt	1,609; 1,609	M M
175	116	Bullsbay (USA)	5	H	USA	1st 3rd	Whitney Handicap; Woodward Stakes	Dirt; Dirt	1,811; 1,811	M M
175	116	Cannonball (USA)	4	G	USA	2nd	Golden Jubilee Stakes	Turf	1,207	S
175	116	Capt. Candyman Can (USA)	3	G	USA	1st↑ 2nd	King's Bishop Stakes; Phoenix Stakes	Dirt; Artificial	1,408; 1,207	S S
175	116	Casino Drive (USA)	4	C	JPN	2nd	February Stakes	Dirt	1,600	M
175	116	Crossharbour (GB)	5	H	FR	3rd	Prix Foy	Turf	2,400	L
175	116	Dancing in Silks (USA)	4	G	USA	1st	Breeders' Cup Sprint	Artificial	1,207	S
175	116	Dao Dao (AUS)	5	G	AUS	3rd	Champions Mile	Turf	1,600	M
175	116	El Segundo (NZ)	8	G	AUS	4th	W. S. Cox Plate	Turf	2,040	I
175	116	Flamingo Fantasy (GER)	4	C	GER	1st 2nd	Hansa-Preis; Deutschland-Preis	Turf; Turf	2,400; 2,400	L L
175	116	Georgie Boy (USA)	4	G	USA	1st	San Carlos Handicap	Artificial	1,408	S
175	116	Gozzip Girl (USA)	3	F	USA	1st	American Oaks Invitational	Turf	2,012	I
175	116	Hold Me Back (USA)	3	C	USA	2nd	Travers Stakes	Dirt	2,012	I
175	116	Irian (GER)	3	C	GER	1st 3rd	Mehl-Mülhens-Rennen; Prix Jean Prat	Turf; Turf	1,600; 1,600	M M
175	116	Just As Well (USA)	6	H	USA	2nd	Arlington Million	Turf	2,012	I
175	116	Kane Hekili (JPN)	7	H	JPN	3rd	February Stakes	Dirt	1,600	M
175	116	Karelian (USA)	7	G	USA	2nd	Shadwell Turf Mile Stakes	Turf	1,609	M
175	116	Kirklees (IRE)	5	H	UAE; GB; GB	1st 1st 1st	Xpress 2000; Gala Stakes; September Stakes	Turf; Turf; Artificial	2,000; 2,018; 2,414	I I L
175	116	Kite Wood (IRE)	3	C	GB	1st 2nd	Geoffrey Freer Stakes; St. Leger Stakes	Turf; Turf	2,671; 2,937	L E
175	116	Lahaleeb (IRE)	3	F	GB	1st	E. P. Taylor Stakes	Turf	2,012	I
175	116	Mac Love (GB)	8	G	GB	1st 1st	Sovereign Stakes; Select Stakes	Turf; Turf	1,609; 1,986	M I
175	116	Magical Fantasy (USA)	4	F	USA	1st	John C. Mabee Stakes	Turf	1,811	M
175	116	Man of Iron (USA)	3	C	IRE	1st	Breeders' Cup Marathon	Artificial	2,816	E
175	116	Manhattan Rain (AUS)	3	C	AUS	2nd	W. S. Cox Plate	Turf	2,040	I
175	116	Metal Bender (NZ)	3	G	AUS	1st	Randwick Guineas	Turf	1,600	M
175	116	Monaco Consul (NZ)	3	C	AUS	1st	Victoria Derby	Turf	2,500	L
175	116	Monitor Closely (IRE)	3	C	GB	1st	Great Voltigeur Stakes	Turf	2,414	L
175	116	More Bountiful (NZ)	4	G	HK	1st	Chairman's Trophy	Turf	1,600	M
175	116	Munnings (USA)	3	C	USA	1st	Tom Fool Handicap	Dirt	1,408	S
175	116	Niconero (AUS)	7	G	AUS	1st 1st	Futurity Stakes; Australian Cup	Turf; Turf	1,600; 2,000	M I
175	116	Parading (USA)	6	H	USA	4th	Goodwood Stakes (USA)	Artificial	1,811	M
175	116	Poet (GB)	4	C	IRE	1st 2nd	Kilternan Stakes; Solonaway Stakes	Turf; Turf	2,012; 1,609	I M
175	116	Pompeii Ruler (AUS)	6	G	AUS	1st	Queen Elizabeth Stakes	Turf	2,000	I
175	116	Premio Loco (USA)	5	G	GB	1st	Grosse Europa-Meile	Turf	1,600	M
175	116	Purple Moon (IRE)	6	G	GB	3rd	Dubai Sheema Classic	Turf	2,400	L
175	116	Rainbow View (USA)	3	F	GB	1st	Matron Stakes	Turf	1,609	M
175	116	Rebel Raider (AUS)	3	C	AUS	1st	South Australian Derby	Turf	2,500	L
175	116	Road to Rock (AUS)	5	H	AUS	1st	George Main Stakes	Turf	1,600	M
175	116	Seattle Smooth (USA)	4	F	USA	1st	Ogden Phipps Handicap	Dirt	1,710	M
175	116	Smooth Air (USA)	4	C	USA	1st 2nd	Gulfstream Park Handicap; Metropolitan Handicap	Dirt; Dirt	1,609; 1,609	M M
175	116	Spring House (USA)	7	G	USA	1st	Del Mar Handicap	Turf	2,213	L
175	116	Stotsfold (GB)	6	G	GB	3rd 4th	Arlington Million; Prix Dollar	Turf; Turf	2,012; 1,950	I I
175	116	Super Hornet (JPN)	6	H	JPN	1st	Milers Cup	Turf	1,600	M
175	116	Tamazirte (IRE)	3	F	FR	2nd	Poule d'Essai des Pouliches	Turf	1,600	M
175	116	The Usual Q. T. (USA)	3	C	USA	1st	Hollywood Derby	Turf	2,012	I
175	116	Theseo (AUS)	5	G	AUS	1st 1st	St George Stakes; Ranvet Stakes	Turf; Turf	1,800; 2,000	M I
175	116	Turati (GB)	3	C	ITY	2nd	Premio Roma	Turf	2,000	I
175	116	Two Step Salsa (USA)	4	C	UAE	1st 1st	Wasel Trophy; Godolphin Mile	Dirt; Dirt	1,200; 1,600	S M
175	116	Unrivaled (JPN)	3	C	JPN	1st	Satsuki Sho	Turf	2,000	I
175	116	Veracity (GB)	5	H	UAE	2nd 1st	Concourse 2750; DRC Gold Cup	Turf; Turf	2,750; 3,200	E E
175	116	Virtual (GB)	4	C	GB	1st	Lockinge Stakes	Turf	1,609	M
175	116	Vision and Power (NZ)	6; 7	G	AUS	1st 3rd	George Ryder Stakes; Yalumba Stakes	Turf; Turf	1,500; 2,000	M I
175	116	Wanted (AUS)	3	C	AUS	2nd	Patinack Farm Classic	Turf	1,200	S
175	116	Zipping (AUS)	8	G	AUS	3rd 1st	W. S. Cox Plate; Sandown Classic	Turf; Turf	2,040; 2,400	I L
236	115	Air Shady (JPN)	8	H	JPN	5th 3rd	Japan Cup; Arima Kinen	Turf; Turf	2,400; 2,500	L L
236	115	Alexandros (GB)	4	C	UAE; GB	3rd 2nd	Dubai Duty Free; Lockinge Stakes	Turf; Turf	1,777; 1,609	M M
236	115	Alpine Rose (FR)	4	F	FR	1st	Prix Jean Romanet	Turf	2,000	I
236	115	Arabian Gleam (GB)	5	H	GB	1st	Challenge Stakes	Turf	1,408	M
236	115	Asakusa Kings (JPN)	5	H	JPN	1st 1st	Kyoto Kinen; Hanshin Daishoten	Turf; Turf	2,200; 3,000	L E
236	115	Ashalanda (FR)	3	F	FR	1st	Pride Stakes	Turf	2,414	L
236	115	Awesome Gem (USA)	6	G	USA	7th	Breeders' Cup Classic	Artificial	2,012	I
236	115	Balius (IRE)	6	H	GB	1st	Anatolia Trophy	Artificial	2,000	I
236	115	Balthazaar's Gift (IRE)	6	H	GB	2nd 1st	Lennox Stakes; Hungerford Stakes	Turf; Turf	1,408; 1,408	M M
236	115	Bankable (IRE)	5	H	UAE	1st 3rd	Apple Surprise Trophy; Singapore Airlines International Cup	Turf; Turf	1,777; 2,000	M I
236	115	Bannaby (FR)	6	H	SPA	3rd	Prix Vicomtesse Vigier	Turf	3,100	E
236	115	Baughurst (AUS)	8	G	AUS	5th 1st	Yalumba Stakes; Coongy Handicap	Turf; Turf	2,000; 2,000	I I
236	115	Benbaun (IRE)	8	G	GB	2nd	Nunthorpe Stakes	Turf	1,006	S
236	115	Black Mamba (NZ)	5; 6; 6	M	USA	1st 1st 3rd	Beverly Hills Handicap; CTT and TOC Handicap; Yellow Ribbon Stakes	Turf; Turf; Turf	2,012; 2,213; 2,012	I L I
236	115	Buccellati (GB)	5	H	GB	3rd 3rd	Gordon Richards Stakes; Canadian International	Turf; Turf	2,018; 2,414	I L
236	115	Campanologist (USA)	4	C	GB	2nd 2nd	Hardwicke Stakes; Cumberland Lodge Stakes	Turf; Turf	2,414; 2,414	L L
236	115	Chinchon (IRE)	4	C	FR	4th	QE II Cup	Turf	2,000	I
236	115	Cloudy's Knight (USA)	9	G	USA	2nd	Breeders' Cup Marathon	Artificial	2,816	E
236	115	Coastal Path (GB)	5	H	FR	2nd	Prix d'Hédouville	Turf	2,400	L
236	115	Commentator (USA)	8	G	USA	3rd	Whitney Handicap	Dirt	1,811	M
236	115	Confront (GB)	4	G	GB	2nd 6th	Summer Mile Stakes; Hong Kong Mile	Turf; Turf	1,609; 1,600	M M
236	115	Cost of Freedom (USA)	6	G	USA	3rd	Breeders' Cup Sprint	Artificial	1,207	S
236	115	Crown of Thorns (USA)	4	C	USA	2nd	Breeders' Cup Sprint	Artificial	1,207	S
236	115	Curtain Call (FR)	4	C	GB	4th 2nd	Grand Prix de Saint-Cloud; Royal Whip Stakes	Turf; Turf	2,400; 2,012	L I
236	115	Dancer's Daughter (GB)	5	M	SAF	2nd	J&B Met	Turf	2,000	I
236	115	Denman (AUS)	3	C	AUS	1st	Golden Rose Stakes	Turf	1,400	M
236	115	Diamondrella (GB)	5	M	USA	1st	First Lady Stakes	Turf	1,609	M
236	115	Doctor Fremantle (GB)	4	C	GB	1st	Arc Trial	Turf	2,217	L
236	115	Duff (IRE)	6	G	IRE	1st	Concorde Stakes	Turf	1,500	M
236	115	Duporth (AUS)	3	C	AUS	1st	BTC Cup	Turf	1,200	S
236	115	Dynaforce (USA)	6	M	USA	1st	Beverly D. Stakes	Turf	1,911	I
236	115	Earl of Surrey (ZIM)	5	H	SAF	1st	Golden Horse Casino Sprint	Turf	1,200	S
236	115	Father Time (GB)	3	C	GB	1st	King Edward VII Stakes	Turf	2,414	L
236	115	Ferneley (IRE)	5	H	USA	2nd 5th	Woodbine Mile; Hong Kong Mile	Turf; Turf	1,609; 1,600	M M
236	115	Finallymadeit (USA)	5	H	USA	2nd	Donn Handicap	Dirt	1,811	M
236	115	Fiumicino (NZ)	5	G	AUS	1st	The BMW	Turf	2,400	L
236	115	Flying Private (USA)	3	C	USA	4th	Preakness Stakes	Dirt	1,911	I
236	115	Forgettable (JPN)	3	C	JPN	4th	Arima Kinen	Turf	2,500	L
236	115	Friesan Fire (USA)	3	C	USA	1st	Louisiana Derby	Dirt	1,710	M
236	115	Furthest Land (USA)	4	G	USA	1st	Breeders' Cup Dirt Mile	Artificial	1,609	M
236	115	Gayego (USA)	4	C	USA	1st 4th	Ancient Title Stakes; Breeders' Cup Sprint	Artificial; Artificial	1,207; 1,207	S S
236	115	Girolamo (USA)	3	C	USA	1st	Jerome Handicap	Dirt	1,609	M
236	115	Global Hunter (ARG)	6	H	USA	1st 2nd	Eddie Read Handicap; Oak Tree Mile	Turf; Turf	1,811; 1,609	M M
236	115	Green Birdie (NZ)	6	G	HK	4th	Hong Kong Sprint	Turf	1,200	S
236	115	Hawkes Bay (GB)	7	G	HK	1st	ATV Cup	Turf	1,600	M
236	115	High Heeled (IRE)	3	F	GB	1st	St. Simon Stakes	Turf	2,419	L
236	115	Hot Cha Cha (USA)	3	F	USA	1st	Queen Elizabeth II Challenge Cup	Turf	1,811	M
236	115	Indian Blessing (USA)	4	F	USA	1st	Gallant Bloom Handicap	Dirt	1,308	S
236	115	Interpatation (USA)	7	G	USA	1st	Joe Hirsch Turf Classic Invitational	Turf	2,414	L
236	115	Jay Peg (SAF)	5	H	UAE	2nd=	Jebel Hatta	Turf	1,777	M
236	115	Kamsin (GER)	4	C	GER	4th	Hansa-Preis	Turf	2,400	L
236	115	Kapil (SAF)	6	G	SAF	3rd	Queen's Plate (SAF)	Turf	1,600	M
236	115	King's Apostle (IRE)	5	H	GB	2nd	Duke of York Stakes	Turf	1,207	S
236	115	Laurel Guerreiro (JPN)	5	H	JPN	1st	Sprinters Stakes	Turf	1,200	S
236	115	Lethal Heat (USA)	4	F	USA	2nd	Lady's Secret Stakes	Artificial	1,710	M
236	115	Light Fantastic (AUS)	4	G	AUS	4th 2nd	C. F. Orr Stakes; All Aged Stakes	Turf; Turf	1,400; 1,400	M M
236	115	Look Here (GB)	4	F	GB	3rd	Coronation Cup	Turf	2,423	L
236	115	Magadan (IRE)	4	C	FR	9th	Prix de l'Arc de Triomphe	Turf	2,400	L
236	115	Marchfield (CAN)	5	H	CAN	1st	Sky Classic Stakes	Turf	2,213	L
236	115	Master O'Reilly (NZ)	7	G	AUS	4th 4th	Yalumba Stakes; Melbourne Cup	Turf; Turf	2,000; 3,200	I E
236	115	Midships (USA)	4	C	USA	1st 1st 1st	San Luis Rey Handicap; San Juan Capistrano Handicap; Charles Whittingham Memorial H.	Turf; Turf; Turf	2,414; 2,816; 2,012	L E I
236	115	Miss Isella (USA)	4	F	USA	1st 1st	Louisville Distaff Stakes; Fleur de Lis Handicap	Dirt; Dirt	1,710; 1,811	M M
236	115	Mourilyan (IRE)	5	H	UAE	3rd	Melbourne Cup	Turf	3,200	E
236	115	Mr. Sidney (USA)	5	H	USA	1st	Firecracker Handicap	Turf	1,609	M
236	115	Never Bouchon (JPN)	6	H	JPN	1st	American Jockey Club Cup	Turf	2,200	L
236	115	Nicconi (AUS)	4	C	AUS	1st 3rd	McEwen Stakes; Manikato Stakes	Turf; Turf	1,000; 1,200	S S
236	115	Old Fashioned (USA)	3	C	USA	2nd	Arkansas Derby	Dirt	1,811	M
236	115	Our Giant (AUS)	5	H	SAF	2nd 1st 1st	Queen's Plate (SAF); Hawaii Stakes; Mercury Sprint	Turf; Turf; Turf	1,600; 1,400; 1,200	M M S
236	115	Packing Winner (NZ)	6; 7	G	HK	5th 1st	QE II Cup; Sha Tin Trophy	Turf; Turf	2,000; 1,600	I M
236	115	Phelan Ready (AUS)	3	G	AUS	2nd	Manikato Stakes	Turf	1,200	S
236	115	Pioneerof the Nile (USA)	3	C	USA	1st	Santa Anita Derby	Artificial	1,811	M
236	115	Precious Boy (GER)	4	C	GER	2nd	Bayerisches Zuchtrennen	Turf	2,000	I
236	115	Pyro (USA)	4	C	USA	1st	Forego Stakes	Dirt	1,408	S
236	115	Rangirangdoo (NZ)	5	G	AUS	1st	Crystal Mile	Turf	1,600	M
236	115	Red Desire (JPN)	3	F	JPN	3rd	Japan Cup	Turf	2,400	L
236	115	Red Rocks (IRE)	6	H	GB	5th	Breeders' Cup Turf	Turf	2,414	L
236	115	Roman Emperor (NZ)	3; 4	C	AUS	1st 2nd	Australian Derby; Caulfield Cup	Turf; Turf	2,400; 2,400	L L
236	115	Royal Discretion (AUS)	4	G	AUS	3rd	All Aged Stakes	Turf	1,400	M
236	115	Russian Sage (SAF)	4	H	UAE	2nd=	Jebel Hatta	Turf	1,777	M
236	115	Sarrera (AUS)	8	G	AUS	2nd=	Queen Elizabeth Stakes	Turf	2,000	I
236	115	Sayif (IRE)	3	C	GB	1st	Diadem Stakes	Turf	1,207	S
236	115	Scintillo (GB)	4	C	GB	1st	Grand Prix de Chantilly	Turf	2,400	L
236	115	Selmis (GB)	5	H	ITY	1st 1st	Premio Ambrosiano; Premio Presidente della Repubblica	Turf; Turf	2,000; 2,000	I I
236	115	Seventh Street (USA)	4	F	USA	1st	Go For Wand Handicap	Dirt	1,811	M
236	115	Sniper's Bullet (AUS)	6	G	AUS	1st 1st	Railway Stakes; Kingston Town Classic	Turf; Turf	1,600; 1,800	M M
236	115	Stardom Bound (USA)	3	F	USA	1st	Las Virgenes Stakes	Artificial	1,609	M
236	115	Starlish (IRE)	4	C	FR	5th	Prix Dollar	Turf	1,950	I
236	115	Swift Temper (USA)	5	M	USA	1st 1st	Delaware Handicap; Ruffian Handicap	Dirt; Dirt	2,012; 1,710	I M
236	115	Take the Points (USA)	3	C	USA	1st	Jamaica Handicap	Turf	1,811	M
236	115	Telling (USA)	5	H	USA	1st	Sword Dancer Invitational	Turf	2,414	L
236	115	Thewayyouare (USA)	4	C	IRE	4th	Prix Ganay	Turf	2,100	I
236	115	Thorn Song (USA)	6	H	USA	1st	Shoemaker Mile Stakes	Turf	1,609	M
236	115	Three Rolls (JPN)	3	C	JPN	1st	Kikuka Sho	Turf	3,000	E
236	115	Typhoon Zed (AUS)	5	G	AUS	2nd 3rd	Lightning Stakes; Oakleigh Plate	Turf; Turf	1,000; 1,100	S S
236	115	Utmost Respect (GB)	5	G	GB	1st	Greenlands Stakes	Turf	1,207	S
236	115	Visit (GB)	4	F	USA	2nd 4th	Yellow Ribbon Stakes; Breeders' Cup Filly & Mare Turf	Turf; Turf	2,012; 2,012	I I
236	115	War Artist (AUS)	6	G	GB	1st 1st 3rd	Goldene Peitsche; Prix du Petit Couvert; Prix de l'Abbaye de Longchamp	Turf; Turf; Turf	1,200; 1,000; 1,000	S S S
236	115	Zafisio (IRE)	3	C	GB	1st	Hessen-Pokal	Turf	2,000	I

== Top ranked horses ==
The following table shows the top ranked horses overall, the top three-year-olds, the top older horses and the top fillies and mares in the 2009 Rankings. It also shows the leading performers in various subdivisions of each group, which are defined by the distances of races, and the surfaces on which they are run.

All Horses
	All Surfaces		Dirt / Artificial		Turf	
All Distances	136	Sea the Stars	128	Zenyatta	136	Sea the Stars
Sprint	122	Sacred Kingdom; Scenic Blast	120	Fabulous Strike; Kodiak Kowboy	122	Sacred Kingdom; Scenic Blast
Mile	130	Goldikova	128	Zenyatta	130	Goldikova
Intermediate	136	Sea the Stars	128	Zenyatta	136	Sea the Stars
Long	131	Sea the Stars	121	Mastercraftsman; Summer Bird	131	Sea the Stars
Extended	122	Yeats	116	Man of Iron	122	Yeats
Three-Year-Olds
	All Surfaces		Dirt / Artificial		Turf	
All Distances	136	Sea the Stars	127	Rachel Alexandra	136	Sea the Stars
Sprint	121	Rocket Man	119	Quality Road; Zensational	121	Rocket Man
Mile	129	Rip Van Winkle	127	Rachel Alexandra	129	Rip Van Winkle
Intermediate	136	Sea the Stars	123	Summer Bird	136	Sea the Stars
Long	131	Sea the Stars	121	Mastercraftsman; Summer Bird	131	Sea the Stars
Extended	117	Mastery; Wajir	116	Man of Iron	117	Mastery; Wajir
Older Horses
	All Surfaces		Dirt / Artificial		Turf	
All Distances	130	Goldikova	128	Zenyatta	130	Goldikova
Sprint	122	Sacred Kingdom; Scenic Blast	120	Fabulous Strike; Kodiak Kowboy	122	Sacred Kingdom; Scenic Blast
Mile	130	Goldikova	128	Zenyatta	130	Goldikova
Intermediate	128	Zenyatta	128	Zenyatta	123	Vision d'Etat
Long	125	Conduit; Youmzain	116	Kirklees	125	Conduit; Youmzain
Extended	122	Yeats	115	Cloudy's Knight	122	Yeats
Fillies and Mares
	All Surfaces		Dirt / Artificial		Turf	
All Distances	130	Goldikova	128	Zenyatta	130	Goldikova
Sprint	118	Fleeting Spirit; Informed Decision; Music Note; Ventura	118	Informed Decision; Music Note; Ventura	118	Fleeting Spirit
Mile	130	Goldikova	128	Zenyatta	130	Goldikova
Intermediate	128	Zenyatta	128	Zenyatta	122	Stacelita
Long	120	Dar Re Mi; Sariska		not listed	120	Dar Re Mi; Sariska
Extended		not listed		not listed		not listed

== Guide ==
A complete guide to the main table above.

Rank
A horse's position in the list, with the most highly rated at number 1. Each horse is ranked once according to its highest rating. Any lesser ratings for the same horse are not ranked.

Rating
A rating represents a weight value in pounds, with higher values given to horses which showed greater ability. It is judged that these weights would equalise the abilities of the horses if carried in a theoretical handicap race. The minimum rating required for inclusion is 115.

Horse
Each horse's name is followed by a suffix (from the IFHA's International Code of Suffixes) which indicates the country foaled.

Age
The age of the horse at the time it achieved its rating. The racing ages of all horses foaled in a particular part of the world increase simultaneously, regardless of the actual date of foaling.
Dates of age increase by location foaled
Northern Hemisphere	1 January
South America	1 July
Australia, New Zealand and South Africa	1 August

Sex
C	Colt	Ungelded male horse up to four-years-old
F	Filly	Female horse up to four-years-old
H	Horse	Ungelded male horse over four-years-old
M	Mare	Female horse over four-years-old
G	Gelding	Gelded male horse of any age

Trained
The country where the horse was trained at the time of the rating, abbreviated using the International Code of Suffixes.

Position
The horse's finishing position in the race shown. The actual finishing order can sometimes be amended following an inquiry or a disqualification.
=	Dead-heat
↑	Promoted from original finishing position
↓	Relegated from original finishing position

Race
The race (or one of the races) for which the horse achieved its rating. A defeated horse can be rated above its higher-placed opponents if it carried more weight.

Surface
The surface of the track on which the race was run, eg. turf or dirt. Synthetic surfaces are described as "artificial".

Distance
The distance of the race in metres. In some countries (eg. Canada, Great Britain, Ireland and the United States), the length of a race is usually expressed in miles and furlongs. These units have been converted to metres to allow for universal comparison.
Common conversions
5 furlongs	= 1,006 m	1 mile and 1½ furlongs	= 1,911 m
6 furlongs	= 1,207 m	1 mile and 2 furlongs	= 2,012 m
6½ furlongs	= 1,308 m	1 mile and 2½ furlongs	= 2,112 m
7 furlongs	= 1,408 m	1 mile and 3 furlongs	= 2,213 m
7½ furlongs	= 1,509 m	1 mile and 4 furlongs	= 2,414 m
1 mile	= 1,609 m	1 mile and 6 furlongs	= 2,816 m
1 mile and ½ furlong	= 1,710 m	2 miles	= 3,219 m
1 mile and 1 furlong	= 1,811 m	2 miles and 4 furlongs	= 4,023 m

Category
		Metres	Furlongs
S	Sprint	1,000–1,300; 1,000–1,599 (CAN / USA)	5–6.5; 5–7.99 (CAN / USA)
M	Mile	1,301–1,899; 1,600–1,899 (CAN / USA)	6.51–9.49; 8–9.49 (CAN / USA)
I	Intermediate	1,900–2,100	9.5–10.5
L	Long	2,101–2,700	10.51–13.5
E	Extended	2,701+	13.51+

International Code of Suffixes
The following countries have been represented in the WTR as foaling or training locations since the first edition in 2004.
ARG	Argentina	ITY	Italy
AUS	Australia	JPN	Japan
BRZ	Brazil	KSA	Saudi Arabia
CAN	Canada	NZ	New Zealand
CHI	Chile	SAF	South Africa
CZE	Czech Republic	SIN	Singapore
FR	France	SPA	Spain
GB	Great Britain	TUR	Turkey
GER	Germany	UAE	United Arab Emirates
HK	Hong Kong	USA	United States
HUN	Hungary	VEN	Venezuela
IRE	Ireland	ZIM	Zimbabwe

Shading
The shaded areas represent lesser ratings recorded by horses which were more highly rated in a different category. The IFHA publishes this information when the lower rating is the overall top performance in a particular category.
