= Frank J. De Francis Memorial Dash Stakes top three finishers =

Horse race winners in Maryland, US

This is a listing of the horses that finished in either first, second, or third place and the number of starters in the Frank J. De Francis Memorial Dash Stakes, one of two Grade 1 sprints (other than Breeders Cup races) held in the United States. The "De Francis Dash" is run at a distance of six furlongs on dirt at Laurel Park Racecourse in Laurel, Maryland.

Year	Winner	Second	Third	Starters
1990	Northern Wolf	Glitterman	Sewickley	7
1991	Housebuster	Safely Kept	Clevor Trevor	6
1992	Superstrike	Parisian Flight	King Corrie	12
1993	Montbrok	Lion Cavern	Flaming Emperor	9
1994	Cherokee Run	Boom Towner	Fu Man Slew	11
1995	Lite the Fuse	Crafty Dude	Hot Jaws	7
1996	Lite the Fuse	Meadow Monster	Prospect Bay	7
1997	Smoke Glacken	Wise Dusty	Capote Belle	7
1998	Kelly Kip	Affirmed Success	Partner's Hero	6
1999	Yes It's True	Good and Tough	Storm Punch	6
2000	Richter Scale	Just Call Me Carl	Falkenburg	4
2001	Delaware Township	Xtra Heat	Early Flyer	7
2002	D'wildcat	Deer Run	Sassy Hound	8
2003	A Huevo	Shake You Down	Gators N Bears	10
2004	Wildcat Heir	Midas Eyes	Clock Stopper	10
2005	I'm the Tiger	Tiger Heart	Clever Electrician	14
2006	Thor's Echo	Diabolical	Nightmare Affair	9
2007	Benny the Bull	Talent Search	Miraculous Miss	8
2008	No Race	No Race	No Race	0
2009	Vineyard Haven	Ravalo	Fleet Valid	8
2010	No Race	No Race	No Race	0
2011	Candyman E	Immortal Eyes	Sloane Ranger	9
2012	Action Andy	Il Villano	Immortal Eyes	11
2013	Immortal Eyes	Service for Ten	Royal Currier	11
2014	Zee Bros	Happy My Way	Bern Identity	10
2015	Gentlemen's Bet	Trouble Kid	Palace	8
2016	Ivan Fallunovalot	Rockinn On Bye	X Y Jet	6
2017	Chubilicious	Blu Moon Ace	Whitmore	7
2018	Switzerland	Laki	Sweetontheladies	9
2019	Killybegs Captain	Altissimo	He Hate Me	6
2020				-

== See also ==
- Frank J. De Francis Memorial Dash Stakes
- Laurel Park Racecourse
- American Champion Sprint Horse
- Breeders' Cup Sprint
