= King's Swan =

American Thoroughbred racehorse

- Sire: King's Bishop
- Dam: Royal Cygnet
- Damsire: Sea-Bird
- Sex: Gelding
- Foaled: February 11, 1980
- Country: United States
- Colour: Bay
- Breeder: Mrs. Dion K. Kerr
- Owner: Alvin Akman, Richard E. Dutrow, Sr., Herb Kushner
- Trainer: Richard E. Dutrow, Sr.
- Record: 107: 31-19-18
- Earnings: $1,924,845

Major wins
- Vosburgh Stakes (1986); Maryland Sprint Handicap (1986); Westchester Handicap (1987); Aqueduct Handicap (1987 & 1990); Tom Fool Handicap (1988); Grey Lag Handicap (1988); Stymie Handicap (1988); Bold Ruler Stakes (1988)

Honours
- Retirement ceremony at Aqueduct Racetrack (1990)
- Last updated on February 7, 2007

King's Swan (February 11, 1980 – February 7, 2006) was an American Thoroughbred racehorse nicknamed "The King of Aqueduct" who was so popular with New York City area fans that on his retirement from racing at age ten, he was honored with a retirement ceremony at Aqueduct Racetrack.

== Background ==
King's Swan was sired by King's Bishop, a son of U.S. Racing Hall of Fame inductee Round Table, and was out of the mare Royal Cygnet. His damsire, Sea-Bird, holds the record for the highest Timeform rating in history.

== Racing career ==
Despite his breeding, by age five King's Swan had accomplished little on the racetrack and was put up for sale in claiming races. Trainer Richard Dutrow, Sr., one of Maryland racing's Big Four trainers, recognized the gelding's racing potential and in mid December 1985 organized a partnership to purchase him. The horse soon began winning important graded stakes races in his first season under Dutrow.

King's Swan became one of the best-loved horses on the New York racing circuit. At age ten in 1990, he was still campaigning and winning stakes events, notably capturing his second Aqueduct Handicap.

== Retirement ==
As a gelding, King's Swan was not able to serve as a sire and following his December 22, 1990, retirement he was given to Jean Lazio, his longtime exercise rider. In early December 2005, he shattered a bone in his right front leg that was aggravated after treatment. On February 7, 2006, at the age of twenty-six, King's Swan was humanely euthanized at the Mid-Atlantic Equine Center in Ringoes, New Jersey.
