= Alfred G. Vanderbilt Handicap =

- Class: Grade II
- Location: Saratoga Race Course; Saratoga Springs, New York, United States
- Inaugurated: 1985 (as the A Phenomenon Stakes)
- Race type: Thoroughbred – Flat racing
- Website: NYRA

Race information
- Distance: 6 furlongs
- Surface: Dirt
- Track: left-handed
- Qualification: Three-years-old & older
- Weight: Handicap
- Purse: $400,000 (2025)

The Alfred G. Vanderbilt Handicap is a Grade II American thoroughbred horse race for horses age three and older over a distance of six furlongs on the dirt held annually in late July at Saratoga Race Course in Saratoga Springs, New York.

== History ==
The inaugural running of the event was on 17 August 1985 as the A Phenomenon Stakes, the sixth event on the card that day and was won by the Richard E. Dutrow Sr. trained Cognizant, who won in a time of 1:09 3/5. The event was named after the winner of the 1983 Jim Dandy Stakes at Saratoga, A Phenomenon. A Phenomenon suffered a life-ending injury in the 1984 Forego Handicap.

The event was classified as Grade III in 1990 and in 1995 upgraded to Grade II.

In 2000, the event was renamed to honor Alfred Gwynne Vanderbilt Jr. who had died in 1999. Vanderbilt was a very prominent Thoroughbred owner who also served as chairman of the board of the New York Racing Association from 1971 to 1975.

In 2010 the event was upgraded to Grade I.

The 2019 winner Imperial Hint set a new track record for the six-furlong distance, winning for the second time in a time of 1:07.92.

In 2025 the event was downgraded by the Thoroughbred Owners and Breeders Association to Grade II.

== Records ==
Speed record:

- 1:07.92 – Imperial Hint (2019)

Margins

- 8 lengths – El Deal (2017)

Most wins:

- 2 – Cognizant (1985, 1986)
- 2 – Imperial Hint (2018, 2019)

Most wins by a jockey:

- 4 – Pat Day (1985, 1986, 1992, 1993)
- 4 – Javier Castellano (2015, 2017, 2018, 2019)

Most wins by a trainer:

- 4 – Steven M. Asmussen (2010, 2013, 2020, 2022)

Most wins by an owner:

- 2 – Happy Valley Farm (1985, 1986)
- 2 – H. Joseph Allen (1988, 2006)
- 2 – Hobeau Farm (1991, 1998)
- 2 – Shadwell Racing (1999, 2008)
- 2 – Raymond Mamone (2018, 2019)

== Winners ==
Year	Winner	Age	Jockey	Trainer	Owner	Distance	Time	Purse	Grade	Ref
Alfred G. Vanderbilt Handicap
2026	Built	4	Irad Ortiz Jr.	Wayne M. Catalano	Eclipse Thoroughbred Partners	6 furlongs	1:09.14	$400,000	II	
2025	Book’em Danno	4	Paco Lopez	Derek S. Ryan	Atlantic Six Racing	6 furlongs	1:08.98	$400,000	II	
2024	Nakatomi	5	Tyler Gaffalione	Wesley A. Ward	Qatar Racing & Mrs. Fitriani Hay	6 furlongs	1:09.97	$350,000	I	
2023	Elite Power	5	Irad Ortiz Jr.	William I. Mott	Juddmonte	6 furlongs	1:09.22	$350,000	I	
2022	Jackie's Warrior	4	Joel Rosario	Steven M. Asmussen	J. Kirk & Juby Robison	6 furlongs	1:09.74	$350,000	I	
2021	Lexitonian	5	Jose Lezcano	Jack Sisterson	Calumet Farm	6 furlongs	1:09.38	$350,000	I	
2020	Volatile	4	Ricardo Santana Jr.	Steven M. Asmussen	Three Chimneys Farm & Phoenix Thoroughbred III	6 furlongs	1:09.61	$232,500	I	
2019	Imperial Hint	6	Javier Castellano	Luis Carvajal Jr.	Raymond Mamone	6 furlongs	1:07.92	$350,000	I	
2018	Imperial Hint	5	Javier Castellano	Luis Carvajal Jr.	Raymond Mamone	6 furlongs	1:08.98	$350,000	I	
2017	El Deal	6	Javier Castellano	Jorge Navarro	Michelle & Albert Crawford	6 furlongs	1:09.26	$350,000	I	
2016	A. P. Indian	6	Joe Bravo	Arnaud Delacour	Green Lantern Stables	6 furlongs	1:08.25	$350,000	I	
2015	Rock Fall	4	Javier Castellano	Todd A. Pletcher	Stonestreet Stables	6 furlongs	1:08.75	$350,000	I	
2014	Palace	5	Cornelio Velásquez	Linda L. Rice	Antonino Miuccio	6 furlongs	1:08.56	$350,000	I	
2013	Justin Phillip	4	John R. Velazquez	Steven M. Asmussen	Zayat Stables	6 furlongs	1:08.59	$392,000	I	
2012	Poseidon's Warrior	4	Irad Ortiz Jr.	Robert E. Reid Jr.	Swilcan Stable	6 furlongs	1:09.40	$400,000	I	
2011	Sean Avery	5	Joe Bravo	Allen Iwinski	Black Swan	6 furlongs	1:09.71	$250,000	I	
2010	Majesticperfection	4	Shaun Bridgmohan	Steven M. Asmussen	Padua Stables	6 furlongs	1:08.63	$250,000	I	
2009	Fabulous Strike	6	Ramon A. Dominguez	Todd M. Beattie	Walter Downey	6 furlongs	1:08.69	$250,000	II	
2008	Abraaj	5	Alan Garcia	Kiaran P. McLaughlin	Shadwell Racing	6 furlongs	1:10.23	$250,000	II	
2007	Diabolical	4	Mario G. Pino	Steve Klesaris	Puglisi Stables & Steve Klesaris	6 furlongs	1:08.67	$260,000	II	
2006	War Front	4	José A. Santos	H. Allen Jerkens	H. Joseph Allen	6 furlongs	1:10.21	$208,200	II	
2005	Pomeroy	4	Eibar Coa	Patrick L. Biancone	Michael Tabor & Derrick Smith	6 furlongs	1:08.69	$200,000	II	
2004	Speightstown	6	John R. Velazquez	Todd A. Pletcher	Eugene & Laura Melnyk	6 furlongs	1:08.04	$200,000	II	
2003	Private Horde	4	Jason P. Lumpkins	S. Joe Cain	Billy R. Tucker	6 furlongs	1:09.18	$200,000	II	
2002	Orientate	4	Jerry D. Bailey	D. Wayne Lukas	Robert & Beverly Lewis	6 furlongs	1:09.72	$200,000	II	
2001	Five Star Day	5	Garrett K. Gomez	C. Beau Greely	Columbine Stable & Kitchwa Stables	6 furlongs	1:08.57	$200,000	II	
2000	† Successful Appeal	4	Edgar S. Prado	John C. Kimmel	Starview Stable & John T. L. Jones, Jr	6 furlongs	1:09.21	$200,000	II	
A Phenomenon Handicap
1999	Intidab	6	Robbie Davis	Kiaran P. McLaughlin	Shadwell Racing	6 furlongs	1:09.00	$150,000	II	
1998	Kelly Kip	4	Jean-Luc Samyn	H. Allen Jerkens	Hobeau Farm	6 furlongs	1:09.60	$137,575	II	
A Phenomenon Stakes
1997	Royal Haven	5	Richard Migliore	Gasper S. Moschera	Barbara J. Davis	6 furlongs	1:09.60	$108,700	II	
1996	Prospect Bay	4	Jerry D. Bailey	John C. Kimmel	Lucille Conover	6 furlongs	1:08.20	$109,600	II	
A Phenomenon Handicap
1995	Not Surprising	5	Robbie Davis	Judson Van Worp	Robert Van Worp	6 furlongs	1:09.60	$111,900	II	
1994	Boundary	4	John R. Velazquez	William I. Mott	Mrs. W. H. Perry	6 furlongs	1:08.60	$109,800	III	
A Phenomenon Stakes
1993	Gold Spring (ARG)	5	Pat Day	Jesse N. Wigginton	Ross Harris	6 furlongs	1:09.20	$117,800	III	
1992	For Really	5	Pat Day	D. Wayne Lukas	Regal Oak Farm	6 furlongs	1:08.60	$119,200	III	
1991	Kid Russell	5	Rafael Mojica Jr.	H. Allen Jerkens	Hobeau Farm	6 furlongs	1:09.40	$119,000	III	
1990	Prospectors Gamble	5	Julio A. Garcia	Brian A. Mayberry	Jan Siegel	6 furlongs	1:09.20	$84,000	III	
1989	Mr. Nickerson	3	José A. Santos	Mark J. Reid	Robert H. A. Nixon	6 furlongs	1:08.80	$87,750		
1988	High Brite	4	Ángel Cordero Jr.	D. Wayne Lukas	H. Joseph Allen	6 furlongs	1:10.00	$84,000		
1987	Banker's Jet	5	Jorge L. Vargas	Salvatore J. Longo	Gerald Fineberg	6 furlongs	1:09.00	$82,830		
1986	Cognizant	5	Pat Day	Richard E. Dutrow Sr.	Happy Valley Farm	6 furlongs	1:09.20	$55,300		
1985	Cognizant	4	Pat Day	Richard E. Dutrow Sr.	Happy Valley Farm	6 furlongs	1:09.60	$55,600		

Notes:

† In the 2000 running Intidab crossed the finish line first but was later disqualified; Successful Appeal was declared the winner.

== See also ==
List of American and Canadian Graded races
