= Richard E. Dutrow Sr. =

American horse trainer (1937–1999)

Personal information
- Born: March 8, 1937 United States
- Died: February 19, 1999 (aged 61)
- Occupation: Trainer

Horse racing career
- Sport: Horse racing
- Career wins: 3,665

Major racing wins
- Oceanport Handicap (1973); Vosburgh Stakes (1986); Tom Fool Handicap (1988); Aqueduct Handicap (1987, 1990); Bold Ruler Handicap (1988, 1996); Gardenia Stakes (1990); Carter Handicap (1995, 1996); Frank J. De Francis Memorial Dash (1995, 1996)

Racing awards
- U.S. Champion Thoroughbred Trainer by wins (1975)

Significant horses
- Flawlessly, King's Swan, Lite The Fuse

Richard E. "Dick" Dutrow Sr. (March 8, 1937 – February 19, 1999) was an American Thoroughbred racehorse trainer. Dutrow, along with King T. Leatherbury, John J. Tammaro Jr. and Hall of Fame inductee Bud Delp, were known as Maryland racing's "Big Four". They dominated racing in that state during the 1960s and 1970s and helped modernize flat racing training.

Richard Dutrow Sr. began training race horses in the 1950s. Living in Hagerstown, Maryland, where his son Richard Jr. was born in 1959, his success at the small half-mile track in his hometown plus at others in such places as Bel Air, Upper Marlboro and Cumberland as well as at Waterford Park in Chester, West Virginia led to his moving to the larger tracks on the Maryland racing circuit. For many years Dutrow concentrated on making a living through winning as many races as possible through his astute horse selection and his training methods. However, later in his career he competed on the New York racing circuit and developed top Grade I winners such as Lite The Fuse and the horse known as the "King of Aqueduct," King's Swan. He trained future U.S. Racing Hall of Fame inductee Flawlessly through her two-year-old season before the filly was sent by her owner to race in California.

In 1975, Richard Dutrow led all trainers in the United States with a then record 352 wins.

Although Richard E. Dutrow Sr. died in 1999, as at April 2010 he remains in the all-time top fifteen in career wins by trainers.
