= Harford Mall =

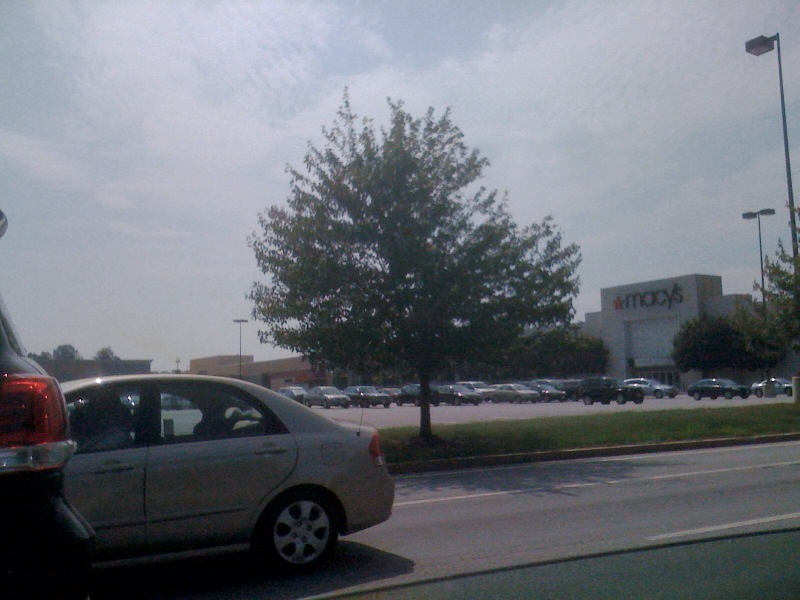
- Harford Mall in 2009
- Location: Bel Air, Maryland, United States
- Coordinates: 39.525859°N 76.358017°W
- Address: 696 Bel Air Rd
- Opened: 1973
- Closed: November 8, 2026
- Developer: Mid Atlantic Realty Trust
- Owner: CBL Properties (with SJC Ventures owning portions of the property for redevelopment)
- Num. of stores: 34
- Num. of anchor tenants: 3 (2 under redevelopment, 1 demolished and redeveloped)
- Floor area: 505,372 sq ft (46,950.6 m^{2})
- Floors: 1
- Parking: 2,542 (including Annex)
- Public transit: Harford Transit bus: 1, 1A, 2, 2A, 3
- Website: www.harfordmall.com

The Harford Mall was a shopping mall owned by CBL Properties that is located near the junction of Maryland Route 24 and U.S. Route 1, about 32 miles (51 km) north of Baltimore, in Bel Air, Maryland, United States. It is the only shopping mall in Harford County, Maryland. The mall was built on the previous site of the Bel Air Racetrack. The Mall closed on November 8, 2026

== History ==
Originally opened in 1973 by Mid Atlantic Realty Trust, it featured an E.J. Korvette and Montgomery Ward as its anchor stores. Among the other original tenants were Waldenbooks, Friendly Ice Cream, Horn and Horn, and a multi-screen cinema. Korvette became Hutzler's then Hecht's, and finally Macy's. Another early tenant was an F.W. Woolworth Company store in center court. Sears replaced Montgomery Ward. The Harford Mall was purchased by CBL & Associates Property, Inc. in 2003 for $71 million. Hochschild Kohn was opened during the first expansion of the mall. The store opened in October 1977. This later became the original food court.

During the period of 2006 and 2007, the mall underwent an extensive renovation. The center court and the interior of the mall were remodeled, and the exterior was also given a facelift. The original indoor food court was entirely removed in favor of additional retail space. A new "food court" was constructed outside the mall, at which time new restaurants such as Qdoba, Bonefish Grill, Five Guys, Vaccaros Italian Pastries, and Red Robin moved into the outdoor spaces. In addition, more upscale retailers, such as Hollister (which replaced the former KB Toys and later closed) and American Eagle were also added. In 2013, the mall lost longtime tenant Old Navy, which moved to the new Boulevard at Box Hill shopping center in Abingdon, Maryland and was then replaced by The Shoe Department Encore, and Payless Shoe Source announced plans to close its Harford Mall location in February 2019 as part of the chain's bankruptcy. In the same month, Charlotte Russe also announced plans to close its Harford Mall location along with many other stores across the country. Other eateries located inside the mall include The Greene Turtle, Friendly's, and Pretzel Twister. In early February 2020, Sears, one of Harford Mall's two anchor stores, closed its location at the mall, as a result of its bankruptcy filing.

The mall is located across from what is known as the Harford Mall Annex, which is a section of retail stores located directly across the street from the mall on Boulton Street, facing one of the entrances to Macy's. Stores located in the Annex include Office Depot, Dollar Tree, PetSmart and Banfield Pet Hospital, and Best Buy.

On January 9, 2025, it was announced that Macy's store would be closing as part of a plan to close 66 stores nationwide. The store closed in March 2025, leaving the mall with no anchors

== Redevelopment ==
The former Sears department store site, which ceased operation in early 2020, has been undergoing a significant repositioning as part of the mall’s larger, multi-phase redevelopment plan. The Sears store, which originally opened in 2001 (replacing the Montgomery Ward department store that anchored the mall since 1973), was demolished beginning in early 2022, with the demolition completed by March 2022.

The clearance of the Sears structure initiated the first phase of the development, which involved building a new retail structure on the parcel. This development is an open-air shopping complex situated immediately adjacent to the existing mall building, designed to be a distinct shopping destination that is not physically connected to the enclosed mall itself. This first phase, which involved the former Sears footprint, was approved to accommodate a major grocer. Contrary to earlier reports suggesting the cancellation of plans, the former Sears site was specifically rebuilt to accommodate an Amazon Fresh grocery store, which is expected to move into the space in 2026.

This grocery store addition is part of a larger revitalization effort. The overall mall project, which includes plans for residential units and the subsequent redevelopment of the former Macy’s property (Phase 3), is planned to include a second major grocery anchor. Developers have confirmed that the new open-air complex will also feature a Whole Foods Market as a primary tenant. This Whole Foods store is expected to occupy a 35,600-square-foot building on the redeveloped Macy's parcel, which will feature four additional retail buildings and restaurants, including confirmed tenants like THB Bagelry and Deli.

Announced in June 2026, demolition of the former Macy's is expected to start in July to replace it with a mixed-use development known as Derby Place.

Harford Mall closed on November 8, 2026, as part of the redevelopment of the property into a mixed-use complex. The shopping center's exterior stores and restaurants remained open following the closure of the enclosed mall.
