= Kelly Kip =

American-bred Thoroughbred racehorse

- Sire: Kipper Kelly
- Grandsire: Valid Appeal
- Dam: Marianne Theresa
- Damsire: John's Gold
- Sex: Stallion
- Foaled: 19 April 1994
- Country: United States
- Colour: Dark Bay or Brown
- Owner: Hobeau Farm
- Trainer: H. Allen Jerkens
- Record: 31: 15-3-4

Major wins
- Tremont Stakes (1996); Sanford Stakes (1996); Forest Hills Handicap (1997); Bold Ruler Handicap (1998, 1999); Frank J. De Francis Memorial Dash Stakes (1998); A Phenomenon Handicap (1998)

Kelly Kip is a retired American Thoroughbred racehorse and active stallion. In a five-year racing career which was interrupted on several occasions by sickness and injury, he ran thirty-one times and won fifteen races, most of them over a distance of six furlongs. He never won a Grade I level stakes race and never won a Breeders' Cup race or an Eclipse Award, but he set track records at several major racetracks and was regarded as one of the leading North American sprinters of the late 1990s. His trainer H. Allen Jerkens called Kelly Kip "the fastest horse I have been around".

== Background ==
Kelly Kip was a dark bay or brown horse with a narrow white stripe. He was by far the most successful horse sired by the Illinois-bred Kipper Kelly, a horse which never won at Graded level. Kelly Kip was trained throughout his career by H. Allen Jerkens who was voted Eclipse Award for Outstanding Trainer in 1973 when his horses Onion and Prove Out both defeated Secretariat. In 1975 he had become the youngest trainer ever inducted into the National Museum of Racing and Hall of Fame at the age of forty-five. Like both Prove Out and Onion, Kelly Kip was bred in Ocala, Florida by Jack Dreyfus's Hobeau Farm. He was ridden in most of his races by the French-born jockey Jean-Luc Samyn.

== Racing career ==
=== 1996: two-year-old season ===
Kelly Kip's first appearance was in a five furlong claiming race at Belmont Park on June 21, 1996. He led from the start and won by six and a half lengths in a time of 55.75 breaking the track record previously held by Lure. Two weeks later he was moved up into Graded stakes class and won the six furlong Tremont Stakes by six and three quarter lengths, leading to his being described as the "instant star" of the Belmont season. In July Kelly Kip recorded his third straight victory, and the second in stakes company when he won the Sanford Stakes at Saratoga Race Course by ten and a half lengths.

On 31 August Kelly Kip moved up in distance to seven furlongs and started the 4/5 favorite for the Hopeful Stakes at Saratoga. He failed to reproduce his earlier form as he finished seventh of the eight runners behind Smoke Glacken, leading Jerkens to suggest that the distance of the race had been beyond the limits of his horse's stamina.

After a break of three months, during which he was treated for a lung infection, Kelly Kip returned at Aqueduct Racetrack in November. He won the Huntington Stakes by five and a half lengths from Confide to end the season with four wins in five starts. The win encouraged Jerkens to believe that the colt might still be able to compete over longer distances.

=== 1997: three-year-old season ===
In January at Gulfstream Park Kelly Kip was beaten by Confide in Spectacular Bid Stakes. Following his defeat in Florida, the colt's season was affected by illnesses and he showed little worthwhile form before running at Belmont in autumn. In October he carried a weight of 111 pounds to win the Forest Hills Handicap from the four-year-old Crafty Friend.

=== 1998: four-year-old season ===
In 1998 Kelly Kip ran twelve times and won six races, all of them over sprint distances. In April he set a new track record of 1:07.6 for six furlongs at Aqueduct in the Bold Ruler Handicap, and in June he won the Finger Lakes Breeders' Cup in 1:08 – another track record time. He was also beaten favorite on several occasions in the first half of the year which Jerkens explained by noting that Kelly Kip had knee problems and was not "the soundest of horses". At Laurel Park Racecourse in July, Kelly Kip was a last minute entry for the De Francis Memorial Dash, the second most valuable sprint of the season. He won from Affirmed Success in a time of 1:08.2, beating the race record set in 1991 by Housebuster. The trainer of the runner up described the winner as "probably the best sprinter in the country right now".

In August Kelly Kip was sent to Saratoga to contest the Grade II A Phenomenon Handicap, a race which later became the Grade I Alfred G. Vanderbilt Handicap. Carrying the high weight of 122 pounds, he turned back a strong early challenge from Richter Scale and won by three lengths from Trafalgar. After the race, Jerkens called Kelly Kip "remarkable", while Samyn described him as "sprint-champion material". In the following month, Kelly Kip finished unplaced behind Affirmed Success in a highly anticipated race for the seven furlong Vosburgh Stakes.

=== 1999–2000: later career ===
Kelly Kip won both of his races as a five-year-old. The more notable of his successes was a second victory in the Bold Ruler Handicap, in which he defeated Artax and broke the track record again, with a time of 1:07.54. Later that season, Artax won the Breeders' Cup Sprint and was named American Champion Sprint Horse. Kelly Kip on the other hand, missed the remainder of the year with a hock infection.

Kelly Kip was less successful in 2000, but showed some good form in defeat when finishing second by a head when attempting to win a third Bold Ruler Handicap. He won one minor race but was again sidelined for much of the year when his hock infection recurred. He was retired from racing after sustaining an injury in a sixth-place finish in the Forest Hills Handicap.

== Stud career ==
Kelly Kip began his career as a breeding stallion at Meadowbrook at Ocala before moving to Highcliff Farm, near Delanson, New York in 2002. More recently, he has been based at Vinewood Farms in California. The most successful of his progeny has been the filly Bettarun Fast, who won the Santa Paula Stakes and the Railbird Stakes in 2006. He has also had some success as a sire of Quarter Horses.

== Pedigree ==
Pedigree of Kelly Kip (USA), bay or brown stallion, 1994
Sire Kipper Kelly (USA) 1987	Valid Appeal; 1972	In Reality	Intentionally*
Sire Kipper Kelly (USA) 1987	Valid Appeal; 1972	In Reality	My Dear Girl
Sire Kipper Kelly (USA) 1987	Valid Appeal; 1972	Desert Trial	Moslem Chief
Sire Kipper Kelly (USA) 1987	Valid Appeal; 1972	Desert Trial	Scotch Verdict
Sire Kipper Kelly (USA) 1987	Plum Ten; 1979	Tentam	Intentionally*
Sire Kipper Kelly (USA) 1987	Plum Ten; 1979	Tentam	Tamerett
Sire Kipper Kelly (USA) 1987	Plum Ten; 1979	Misty Plum	Misty Day
Sire Kipper Kelly (USA) 1987	Plum Ten; 1979	Misty Plum	Plumage
Dam Marianne Theresa (USA) 1985	John's Gold; 1979	Bold Bidder	Bold Ruler
Dam Marianne Theresa (USA) 1985	John's Gold; 1979	Bold Bidder	High Bid
Dam Marianne Theresa (USA) 1985	John's Gold; 1979	Hardliner	Buckpasser
Dam Marianne Theresa (USA) 1985	John's Gold; 1979	Hardliner	Royal Match
Dam Marianne Theresa (USA) 1985	Chalk Lullah; 1977	Peace Corps	Restless Native
Dam Marianne Theresa (USA) 1985	Chalk Lullah; 1977	Peace Corps	Rosy Prospect
Dam Marianne Theresa (USA) 1985	Chalk Lullah; 1977	Lullah Lullah	Native Dancer
Dam Marianne Theresa (USA) 1985	Chalk Lullah; 1977	Lullah Lullah	Lullah (Family: 4-n)

* Kelly Kip is inbred 4S × 4S to the stallion Intentionally, meaning that he appears twice fourth generation on the sire side of his pedigree.
