= Benny the Bull (horse) =

American-bred Thoroughbred racehorse

- Sire: Lucky Lionel
- Grandsire: Mt. Livermore
- Dam: Comet Cat
- Damsire: Birdonthewire
- Sex: Stallion
- Foaled: 3 March 2003
- Country: United States
- Colour: Dark bay or Brown
- Breeder: Tamoka Farms
- Owner: Greg James; IEAH Stables
- Trainer: Jeff Talley; Richard E. Dutrow Jr.
- Record: 20: 9-3-2

Major wins
- Frank J. De Francis Memorial Dash (2007); Sunshine Millions Sprint (2008); Dubai Golden Shaheen (2008); True North Handicap (2008); Smile Sprint Handicap (2008)

Awards
- American Champion Sprint Horse (2008)

Benny the Bull is a retired American Thoroughbred racehorse and active stallion. A specialist sprinter, he raced mainly over distances of six and seven furlongs and won races including the Frank J. De Francis Memorial Dash, Sunshine Millions Sprint, True North Handicap and Smile Sprint Handicap. In 2008 he became one of the relatively few American-trained racehorses to win a major international race overseas when he won the Dubai Golden Shaheen. In the same year he was voted American Champion Sprint Horse at the Eclipse Awards.

== Background ==
Benny the Bull is a dark bay or brown horse bred in Florida by Tamoka Farms. He was sired by Lucky Lionel, an American-bred horse who was trained in Europe, where he won the Norfolk Stakes and the Prix Robert Papin in 1995. In September 2004, the yearling was consigned to the Keeneland Sales where he was bought by Greg James for $38,000.

== Racing career ==
=== 2007: four-year-old season ===
Originally trained by Jeff Talley, Benny the Bull won the Iowa Sprint Handicap at Prairie Meadows in June before being sold and transferred to the stable of Rick Dutrow. Moved up to Grade I competition he finished second to Midnight Lute in the Forego Stakes at Saratoga Race Course and fourth behind the same horse in the Breeders' Cup Sprint. In November he recorded his most important victory when winning the Frank J. De Francis Memorial Dash at Laurel Park Racecourse.

=== 2008: five-year-old season ===
Benny the Bull began his five-year-old season by winning the Sunshine Millions Sprint, part of a series of races restricted to horses bred in Florida or California. In March the horse was sent to the United Arab Emirates to contest the Dubai Golden Shaheen an international sprint race run on dirt at Nad Al Sheba Racecourse. In a field which included runners from South Africa and Brazil, Benny the Bull was held up by Edgar Prado before producing a strong late challenge to catch Idiot Proof in the closing stages and win by one and three quarter lengths.

On his return to America, Benny the Bull won the True North Handicap at Belmont Park in June, carrying top weight of 123 pounds, with Thor's Echo in fourth. In the following month carried top weight of 124 pounds to victory in the Smile Sprint Handicap at Calder Race Course, displaying what The Blood-Horse magazine described as a "devastating turn of foot". In August, Benny the Bull sustained an ankle injury in training at Aqueduct Racetrack, which ruled him out for the rest of the season.

=== 2009: six-year-old season ===
Benny the Bull remained in training as a six-year-old, but was unable to reproduce his earlier success. He finished second under top weight in both the True North Handicap and the Smile Sprint Handicap and ran fourth in the Alfred G. Vanderbilt Handicap.

== Assessment and honors ==
In the voting for the Eclipse Award's American Champion Sprint Horse for 2008, Benny the Bull won the title by beating Midnight Lute by 107 votes to 86.

== Stud career ==
Benny the Bull was retired from racing to stand as a stallion at the Vinery Stud in Florida. In 2012 it was announced that he would also be "shuttled" to Brazil for the Southern Hemisphere breeding season.

== Pedigree ==
Pedigree of Benny the Bull (USA), bay or brown stallion, 2003
Sire Lucky Lionel (USA) 1993	Mt Livermore; 1981	Blushing Groom	Red God
Sire Lucky Lionel (USA) 1993	Mt Livermore; 1981	Blushing Groom	Runaway Bride
Sire Lucky Lionel (USA) 1993	Mt Livermore; 1981	Flama Ardiente	Crimson Satan
Sire Lucky Lionel (USA) 1993	Mt Livermore; 1981	Flama Ardiente	Royal Rafale
Sire Lucky Lionel (USA) 1993	Crafty Nan; 1987	Crafty Prospector	Mr. Prospector
Sire Lucky Lionel (USA) 1993	Crafty Nan; 1987	Crafty Prospector	Real Crafty Lady
Sire Lucky Lionel (USA) 1993	Crafty Nan; 1987	Blake's Twin	Blakeney
Sire Lucky Lionel (USA) 1993	Crafty Nan; 1987	Blake's Twin	Regal Twin
Dam Comet Cat (USA) 1998	Birdonthewire; 1989	Proud Birdie	Proud Clarion
Dam Comet Cat (USA) 1998	Birdonthewire; 1989	Proud Birdie	Bernie Bird
Dam Comet Cat (USA) 1998	Birdonthewire; 1989	Silk and Wrapper	Jontilla
Dam Comet Cat (USA) 1998	Birdonthewire; 1989	Silk and Wrapper	Lahaina
Dam Comet Cat (USA) 1998	Granny's Kitty; 1992	Comet Kat	Foreign Comet
Dam Comet Cat (USA) 1998	Granny's Kitty; 1992	Comet Kat	Scat Kat
Dam Comet Cat (USA) 1998	Granny's Kitty; 1992	Sequel	J O Tobin
Dam Comet Cat (USA) 1998	Granny's Kitty; 1992	Sequel	Consequential (Family: 16-a)
