= Royal Haven =

American thoroughbred racehorse

- Sire: Hail Emperor
- Grandsire: Graustark
- Dam: Cruising Haven
- Damsire: Shelter Half
- Sex: Stallion
- Foaled: 1992
- Country: USA
- Breeder: Robert T. Manfuso
- Owner: Barbara J. Davis
- Trainer: Gasper S. Moschera
- Record: 41:19-9-5
- Earnings: $891,501

Major wins
- A Phenomenon Handicap (1997); Gravesend Handicap (1997)

Royal Haven (foaled April 30, 1992 ) is an American Thoroughbred racehorse and the winner of the 1997 A Phenomenon Handicap.

== Career ==
Royal Haven won his first career start on May 18, 1995 at Pimlico Race Course. By the end of August, he had picked up three other non-graded non-stakes wins. He competed in the 1995 Pennsylvania Derby coming in 2nd place. He earned his first stakes win in the 1997 Toboggan Stakes. He then picked up the biggest win of his career in the 1997 A Phenomenon Handicap. He had dual third-place finishes at the 1997 Forego Handicap and the 1997 Forest Hills Handicap. He then went on a three race win streak. He won the Fall Highweight Handicap on November 27, 1997. He then won the December 27th, 1997 Gravesend Handicap. He finished the streak off with a win at the February 16th, 1998 General George Handicap. He then finished off his career with a second-place finish at Belmont Park on October 4, 1998.

== Pedigree ==
Pedigree of Royal Haven (USA), 1992
Sire Hail Emperor (USA) 1978	Graustark (USA); 1963	Ribot	Tenerani
Sire Hail Emperor (USA) 1978	Graustark (USA); 1963	Ribot	Romanella
Sire Hail Emperor (USA) 1978	Graustark (USA); 1963	Flower Bowl	Alibhai
Sire Hail Emperor (USA) 1978	Graustark (USA); 1963	Flower Bowl	Flower Red
Sire Hail Emperor (USA) 1978	Queen Empress (USA); 1962	Bold Ruler	Nasrullah
Sire Hail Emperor (USA) 1978	Queen Empress (USA); 1962	Bold Ruler	Miss Disco
Sire Hail Emperor (USA) 1978	Queen Empress (USA); 1962	Irish Jay	Double Jay
Sire Hail Emperor (USA) 1978	Queen Empress (USA); 1962	Irish Jay	Irish Witch
Dam Cruising Haven (USA) 1988	Shelter Half (USA); 1975	Tentam	Intentionally
Dam Cruising Haven (USA) 1988	Shelter Half (USA); 1975	Tentam	Tamerett
Dam Cruising Haven (USA) 1988	Shelter Half (USA); 1975	Gay Matelda	Sir Gaylord
Dam Cruising Haven (USA) 1988	Shelter Half (USA); 1975	Gay Matelda	Hasty Matelda
Dam Cruising Haven (USA) 1988	Sailing Leader (USA); 1972	Mr. Leader	Hail to Reason
Dam Cruising Haven (USA) 1988	Sailing Leader (USA); 1972	Mr. Leader	Jolie Deja
Dam Cruising Haven (USA) 1988	Sailing Leader (USA); 1972	Sailor Town	Sailor
Dam Cruising Haven (USA) 1988	Sailing Leader (USA); 1972	Sailor Town	Dashing
