= Queen Empress =

American thoroughbred racehorse

- Sire: Bold Ruler
- Grandsire: Nasrullah
- Dam: Irish Jay
- Damsire: Double Jay
- Sex: Mare
- Foaled: 1962
- Country: United States
- Color: Bay
- Breeder: Wheatley Stable
- Owner: Wheatley Stable
- Trainer: William C. Winfrey; Edward A. Neloy (1966)
- Record: 33: 15-10-4
- Earnings: US$431,428

Major wins
- Astoria Stakes (1964); Colleen Stakes (1964); Fashion Stakes (1964); Frizette Stakes (1964); Gardenia Stakes (1964); National Stallion Stakes (filly division) (1964); Correction Handicap (1966); Vagrancy Handicap (1966)

Awards
- American Champion Two-Year-Old Filly (1964)

Queen Empress (foaled May 4, 1962 in Kentucky) was an American National Champion Thoroughbred racemare bred and raced by the Wheatley Stable of Gladys Mills Phipps and her brother, Ogden Livingston Mills.

== Background ==
Queen Empress was a full sister to multiple stakes winner King Emperor. They were the daughter of the outstanding U.S. Racing Hall of Fame inductee Bold Ruler who was a multiple National Champion including the 1957 American Horse of the Year. However, he is more widely remembered as the eight-time Leading sire in North America between 1963 and 1973, the most of any sire in the twentieth century. The dam of Queen Empress and King Emperor was the Wheatley Stable's good runner Irish Jay whose wins included the Acorn, Comely, Demoiselle, and Spinaway Stakes. In turn, Irish Jay was a daughter of Double Jay, the 1946 American Champion Two-Year-Old Colt and the Leading broodmare sire in North America in 1971, 1975, 1977, and 1981.

== Racing career ==
=== 1964: Two-Year-Old Season ===
Trained by future U.S. Racing Hall of Fame inductee Bill Winfrey, at age two Queen Empress won six of the important 1964 stakes races for fillies including the Gardenia Stakes, the world's richest race for two-year-old females. In addition, Queen Empress finished first in the 1964 Astarita Stakes at Aqueduct Racetrack but was disqualified to second for interference.

For her 1964 performances, Queen Empress was voted that year's American Champion Two-Year-Old Filly honors.

=== 1965: Three-Year-Old Season ===
At age three Queen Empress did not make her first start until July 20, 1965. She made it winning one, defeating seven other fillies in a six furlong allowance race at Monmouth Park Racetrack in New Jersey. Back in her New York base, a week later she won another six furlong allowance race, this time at Aqueduct Racetrack.

In what would prove to be a difficult year of racing, Queen Empress got her best result in a stakes event with a runner-up finish behind Cestrum in a division of the 1965 Test Stakes at Saratoga Race Course. Also a daughter of Bold Ruler, Cestrum was owned by Allaire du Pont who also owned the mighty Kelso.

On August 12 Queen Empress won another non-stakes race at Saratoga Race Course then was brought back three days later to compete in the Alabama Stakes. Won by What a Treat, in the first half mile Queen Empress was among the leaders but quickly tired and finished 17th in a field of 18 runners.

=== 1966: Four-Year-Old Season ===
In 1966, Queen Empress returned to form under the care of Edward Neloy, another future Hall of Famer who took over that year as Wheatley Stable's head trainer.

In February Queen Empress would earn third place in the Columbiana Handicap at Florida's Hialeah Park then returned north where she won the Correction and Vagrancy Handicaps at Aqueduct Racetrack. At the same track she was in the mix in top races, earning seconds in the Interborough, Liberty Belle, and Distaff Handicaps. As well, she ran second in both the New Castle Stakes at Delaware Park Racetrack and the Barbara Fritchie Handicap at Maryland's Bowie Race Track.

Retired to broodmare duty for her owner, Queen Empress produced seven winners, the best of which was her 1978 Graustark foal Hail Emperor that won the 1983 Native Dancer Handicap. Hail Emperor was the sire of stakes winner Royal Haven.

Her last reported foal was a mare by Graustark, named Frau Stark and was born in 1986.

== Pedigree ==
Pedigree of Queen Empress, bay mare, 1962
| Sire Bold Ruler | Nasrullah | Nearco | Pharos |
| Sire Bold Ruler | Nasrullah | Nearco | Nogara |
| Sire Bold Ruler | Nasrullah | Mumtaz Begum | Blenheim |
| Sire Bold Ruler | Nasrullah | Mumtaz Begum | Mumtaz Mahal |
| Sire Bold Ruler | Miss Disco | Discovery | Display |
| Sire Bold Ruler | Miss Disco | Discovery | Ariadne |
| Sire Bold Ruler | Miss Disco | Outdone | Pompey |
| Sire Bold Ruler | Miss Disco | Outdone | Sweep Out |
| Dam Irish Jay | Double Jay | Balladier | Black Toney |
| Dam Irish Jay | Double Jay | Balladier | Blue Warbler |
| Dam Irish Jay | Double Jay | Broomshot | Whisk Broom II |
| Dam Irish Jay | Double Jay | Broomshot | Centre Shot |
| Dam Irish Jay | Irish Witch | Bold Irishman | Sir Gallahad |
| Dam Irish Jay | Irish Witch | Bold Irishman | Erin |
| Dam Irish Jay | Irish Witch | Witchlike | Diavolo |
| Dam Irish Jay | Irish Witch | Witchlike | Romanesque (family: 23) |
