= Sight Winner =

Hong Kong Thoroughbred racehorse

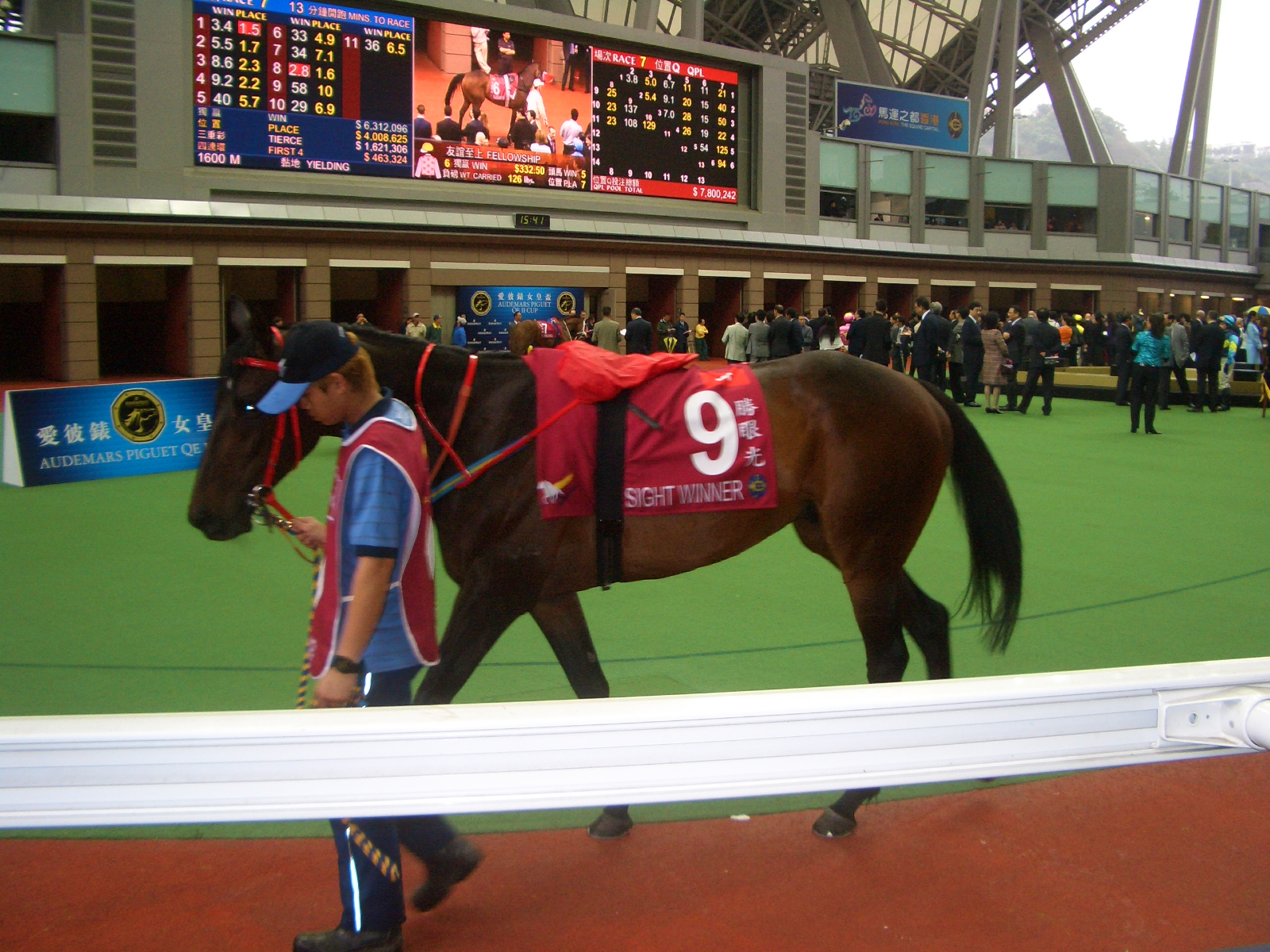
Sight Winner

Sight Winner (Chinese: 勝眼光; foaled 12 October 2003) is a Hong Kong–based retired Thoroughbred racehorse.

It was the Most Improved Horse for 2007/08. In the season of 2008–2009, he sprang a 64-1 surprise to claim his greatest triumph for last. Relishing yielding ground conditions, Sight Winner stalked the leader Egyptian Ra before prevailing in the late stages by a short head in the Group One Champions Mile in late-April. Sight Winner also is one of the nominees of Hong Kong Horse of the Year.

== Profile ==
- Sire: Faltaat
- Dam: Kinjinette
- Sex: Gelding
- Country: New Zealand
- Colour: Brown
- Owner: Mr & Mrs Tam Wing Kun
- Trainer: John Size
- Record: (No. of 1-2-3-Starts) 8-6-4-51 (As of 27 February 2012)
- Earnings: HK$17,284,500 (As of 27 February 2012)
