= Frank J. De Francis Memorial Dash Stakes =

American Thoroughbred horse race

De Francis Memorial Dash
- Class: Listed
- Location: Laurel Park Racecourse, Laurel, Maryland, United States
- Inaugurated: 1990
- Race type: Thoroughbred – Flat racing
- Website: www.laurelpark.com/De+Francis+Dash/

Race information
- Distance: 6 furlong sprint
- Surface: Dirt
- Track: left-handed
- Qualification: Three-year-olds & up
- Weight: Assigned
- Purse: $250,000

The De Francis Memorial Dash is a Listed American Thoroughbred horse race run annually at Laurel Park Racecourse in Laurel, Maryland. Open to horses aged three and older, it is competed on dirt over a distance of six furlongs. It is currently run in late July and offers a purse of $250,000.

== Race history ==
The Frank J. De Francis Memorial Dash is one of the elite sprints in the country. Until 2010, it was one of the only two six-furlong contests with Grade I status, and was second only to the Breeders' Cup Sprint in purse money and prestige. After the race was not run in 2008 and 2010, the race was not eligible for grading in 2011. On December 3, 2015, the Maryland Jockey Club announced that the race has been upgraded to grade III for 2016 by the American Graded Stakes Committee.

The De Francis, first contested in 1990, has played host to champions Housebuster, Safely Kept, and Cherokee Run.

The inaugural De Francis Dash attracted many of the nation’s sprinters to Pimlico Race Course in the summer of 1990. Included in the field were 1989 Sprint Champion Safely Kept and sprinters Glitterman and Sewickley. But at the wire, it was Maryland-bred Northern Wolf in a track record-setting time of 1:09.

The Dash moved to Laurel for its second running. The distinguished field included two champions; Safely Kept and Housebuster as well as leading sprinters Clever Trevor and Sunny Blossom. Housebuster captured the winner's share of the lucrative purse with a five length victory. He was named Eclipse Award Sprint Champion for the second year in a row.

During the next nine years while the Dash reigned as Laurel Park's signature summer event, it was captured by two additional Sprint Champions: Cherokee Run (1994) and Smoke Glacken (1997).

The race was moved to the fall by Maryland Jockey Club Chief Operating Officer Lou Raffetto in 2001 with instant success. Taking advantage of a deep sprinting field three weeks after the Breeders' Cup Sprint, the De Francis Dash attracted a strong field of seven, including four of the top Breeder's Cup finishers with visions of an Eclipse Award.

The De Francis Dash was given Graded stakes status in 1992 and became a Grade I event in 1998. On August 7, 2008 it was announced that the race would be on hiatus for 2008, the Maryland Jockey Club cited financial distress as the reason for the races' cancellation.

It became a grade I race in 1999, but was not run in 2008 and 2010. The race lost its graded status when restored in 2011, then became a Grade III event in 2016.

The De Francis Memorial Dash (G3) is the final and championship leg of the Mid Atlantic Thoroughbred Championships Sprint Dirt Division or MATCh Races. MATCh is a series of five races in five separate thoroughbred divisions run throughout four Mid-Atlantic States including; Pimlico Race Course and Laurel Park Racecourse in Maryland; Delaware Park Racetrack in Delaware; Parx, Philadelphia Park and Presque Isle Downs in Pennsylvania and Monmouth Park in New Jersey.

== Records ==
Speed record:

- 1:07.80 – Richter Scale (2000) {Stakes and track record}

Most wins:

- 2 – Lite The Fuse (1995, 1996)

Most wins by a jockey:

- 3 – Craig Perret (1991, 1994, 1997)
- 3 – Jerry Bailey (1999, 2001, 2005)

Most wins by a trainer:

- 2 – Richard Dutrow Sr. (1995, 1996)
- 2 – Ben W. Perkins Jr. (2001, 2004)
- 2 – D. Wayne Lukas (1999, 2014)

Most wins by an owner:

- 2 – Richard Dutrow Sr. (1995, 1996)

== Winners De Francis Memorial Dash Stakes since 1990 ==
Yr	Winner	Age	Jockey	Trainer	Owner	Dist	Time	Purse	Gr
2020		-				6 fur.	0:00.00	$250,000	III
2019	Killybegs Captain	5	Eric Cancel	John P. Terranova	Curragh Stables	6 fur.	1:08.10	$250,000	III
2018	Switzerland	4	Feargal Lynch	Steve Asmussen	Woodford Racing, LLC	6 fur.	1:09.11	$250,000	III
2017	Chubilicious	6	Horacio Karamanos	Claudio Gonzalez	David Gruskos	6 fur.	1:08.75	$250,000	III
2016	Ivan Fallunovalot	6	Calvin Borel	W. Howard	Lewis Matthews	6 fur.	1:10.07	$250,000	III
2015	Gentlemen's Bet	6	Daniel Centeno	Ron Moquett	Harry T. Rosenblum	6 fur.	1:09.34	$350,000	
2014	Zee Bros	4	José Ortiz	D. Wayne Lukas	Zayat Stables	6 fur.	1:08.77	$350,000	
2013	Immortal Eyes	9	TravisDunkelberger	DamonDilodovico	Robert Abbo Racing	6 fur.	1:08.47	$350,000	
2012	Action Andy	5	HoracioKaramanos	Carlos Garcia	Robert Gerczak	6 fur.	1:10.61	$350,000	
2011	Candyman E	4	Joe Bravo	Anthony Dutrow	Kuehne Racing	6 fur.	1:09.43	$150,000	
2010	No Race	-	No Race	No Race	No Race	-	0:00.00	no race	II
2009	Vineyard Haven	3	Alan Garcia	Saeed bn Suroor	Godolphin Racing	6 fur	1:09.62	$300,000	I
2008	No Race	-	No Race	No Race	No Race	-	0:00.00	no race	I
2007	Benny the Bull	4	Edgar Prado	Richard Dutrow	IEAH Stables	6 fur	1:09.86	$250,000	I
2006	Thor's Echo	4	Corey Nakatani	Doug O'Neill	Pablo Suarez/R.Jaime	6 fur	1:08.71	$300,000	I
2005	I'm The Tiger	5	Jerry Bailey	Robert J. Frankel	Stronach Stable	6 fur	1:09.06	$300,000	I
2004	Wildcat Heir	4	Stewart Elliott	Ben Perkins	Cloverleaf Farms II et al.	6 fur	1:09.45	$300,000	I
2003	A Huevo	7	Ramon Domínguez	Michael Dickinson	Mark S. Hopkins	6 fur	1:08.92	$300,000	I
2002	D'Wildcat	4	Jorge Chavez	Robert B. Hess	Fog City Stable	6 fur	1:10.80	$300,000	I
2001	DelawareTownship	5	Jerry Bailey	Ben W. Perkins	New Farm	6 fur	1:09.00	$300,000	I
2000	Richter Scale	6	Richard Migliore	Mary Jo Lohmeier	N. Fox/N.R. Kaster et al.	6 fur	1:07.80	$300,000	I
1999	Yes Its True	3	Jerry Bailey	D. Wayne Lukas	Padua Stables	6 fur	1:08.60	$300,000	I
1998	Kelly Kip	4	Jean-Luc Samyn	H. Allen Jerkens	Hobeau Farm	6 fur	1:08.40	$300,000	II
1997	Smoke Glacken	3	Craig Perret	Henry L. Carroll	Roberts/Karkenny/Levy	6 fur	1:09.40	$300,000	II
1996	Lite The Fuse	5	Julie Krone	Richard Dutrow	Richard Dutrow Sr.	6 fur	1:08.80	$300,000	II
1995	Lite The Fuse	4	Julie Krone	Richard Dutrow	Richard Dutrow Sr.	6 fur	1:08.80	$300,000	II
1994	Cherokee Run	4	Craig Perret	Frank A. Alexander	Jill E. Robinson	6 fur	1:08.80	$300,000	II
1993	Montbrook	3	Clarence J. Ladner	Dean Gaudet	Israel Cohen	6 fur	1:08.60	$300,000	III
1992	Superstrike	3	Danny Sorenson	Bruce L. Jackson	David R. Kruse	6 fur	1:09.80	$300,000	III
1991	Housebuster	4	Craig Perret	Warren A. Croll Jr.	Robert P. Levy	6 fur	1:08.60	$350,000	
1990	Northern Wolf	4	Mike Luzzi	Harold A. Allen	Deep Silver Stable	6 fur	1:09.00	$350,000	

== See also ==
- Frank J. De Francis Memorial Dash Stakes "top three finishers" and starters
- Laurel Park Racecourse
- American Champion Sprint Horse
- Breeders' Cup Sprint
