= Rock Fall (horse) =

American-bred Thoroughbred racehorse

Rock Fall (foaled March 19, 2011 – October 10, 2015) was a racehorse best known for winning Alfred G. Vanderbilt Handicap, and the Vosburgh Stakes.

== Background ==
Rock Fall was a dark bay horse with no face markings and no leg markings. He was bought for $250,000 at the Fasig Tipton New York Saratoga 2012 Select Yearling Sale. His sire is Speightstown, the winner of the Breeders Cup Sprint. He also is the sire of Breeders Cup Dirt Mile winner Tamarkuz, and Jockey Club Gold Cup winner Haynesfield. Rock Fall's dam, Renda was second in the Forward Gal, and is by Medaglia d'Oro who won the Travers Stakes and sired Hall Of Fame inductee Rachel Alexandra.

== Three-Year-Old Season ==
Rock Fall took a bit longer than other racehorses to begin racing. He did not run until April of his three-year-old season. But he finally made his debut at Gulfstream Park. Unfortunately his introduction to racing was less than stellar, as he broke a step slowly. He then went four wide in a desperate attempt to catch up. However, the move cost him all of his energy causing him to fall back in the pack. In the end, he would cross the finish eighth, 16 lengths behind the winner. It would be the only time Rock Fall ever lost.

His next start would be at Belmont Park, and it went a lot better. This time at the start, despite being slightly bumped, he rushed to the front and had the lead by the first quarter of a mile. For the rest of the race all Rock Fall did was widened his lead. At the wire, he had opened up the lead to a very impressive nine and three quarter lengths. Less than a month later, he was back for another race at Belmont Park. He started in fourth again but this time did not hustle immediately to the lead but stayed in third, three lengths behind the leader. By half a mile, Rock Fall, had gotten the lead at the far turn. He remarkably opened up six lengths but he geared down in the final furlong and finished three and a quarter lengths ahead.

== Four-year-old season ==
After three races from April to June as a three-year-old, he planned to train at Saratoga but he suffered multiple minor injuries which forced him to take nine months off. Finally, he returned as a four-year-old in another allowance. To begin the race, he settled off the leaders in seventh before moving up to sixth by the first quarter of a mile. Surprisingly in just a quarter of a mile he moved from sixth to second and was only a head behind the leader. By the far turn he had opened up one and a half lengths before holding on to win by one length at the wire. Just a month later he would be back and running in his last allowance race of his career. He stayed very close behind the leader by just one length. He then took the lead by half a mile in. The rest of the race was just opening up the lead to a whopping nine lengths, defeating New Orleans Handicap winner Nate's Mineshaft.

After such domination of allowance races, Rock Fall made his graded stakes debut in the True North Stakes. Due to his overwhelming victory in his last start, he was the 6-5 favorite even though he had never run in a stakes race before. It looked as though he did not disappoint, starting fifth and then quickly moving up to third by the first quarter of a mile. After that, he quickly passed everybody barely having the lead by the far turn. For the rest of the race he opened up his lead and slowly ran away from the competition – winning by three and a three quarter lengths and defeating two-time Carter Handicap winner Dads Caps.

Next he went up in class again when he ran in the G1 Alfred G. Vanderbilt Handicap running up against Kings Bishop Stakes winner The Big Beast. At the start, the Big Beast and Favorite Tale fought for the early lead while Rock Fall stayed behind in fourth and then third. By the far turn Favorite Tale had the lead but then began to fade, letting The Big Beast take over the lead. Then out of the blue, Rock Fall took off and got the lead by a nose. Then The Big Beast had the lead. Their two heads were Inseparable and at the wire it was too close to call. After minutes of waiting the race was official. The Big Beast had lost by a nose and Rock Fall would be victorious

After little less than two months of rest, he made his second G1 appearance in the Vosburgh Stakes. He also had one more big challenger in Palace, who won the Alfred G Vanderbilt Handicap as well as the Forego Stakes. It was a battle between two G1 winners. However, Rock Fall was much preferred and was bet down to the 2-5 favorite. Rock Fall started out fourth and then third early but he stayed very close to the leaders, only a length behind Wildcat Red and Weekend Hideaway. By the far turn, Rock Fall was only a head behind and was with three other horses running only heads apart. Soon Wildcat Red faded and it became a three-horse race, then a two-horse race. Stallwakin Dude and Rock Fall were head to head then Rock Fall began to slowly inch away until he was half a length in front. Then out the blue, Salutos Amigos flew late and was about to pass Rock Fall, but Rock Fall fought back the late challenge and was the winner by a neck.

== Death ==
After such success the plan was to work out until the Breeders Cup Sprint. His workout went well but right after the workout he broke down and broke both of his front legs. He was euthanized almost Immediately. Later Stonestreet said on Twitter "We are heartbroken to confirm our Rock Fall sustained a life-ending training injury this morning at Keeneland."
