= Bold Ruler Stakes =

- Class: Grade III
- Location: Belmont Park; Elmont, New York, United States
- Inaugurated: 1976 (as Bold Ruler Handicap at Aqueduct Racetrack)
- Race type: Thoroughbred – Flat racing
- Website: NYRA

Race information
- Distance: 7 furlongs
- Surface: Dirt
- Track: left-handed
- Qualification: Three-years-old and older
- Weight: Base weights with allowances: 4-year-olds and up: 125 lbs. 3-year-olds: 122 lbs.
- Purse: US$175,000 (2024)

The Bold Ruler Stakes is a Grade III American Thoroughbred horse race for three-years-old and older run over a distance of seven furlongs run annually in late October Belmont Park in Elmont, New York. The event currently offers a purse of US$175,000.

== History ==
The race is named for U.S. Racing Hall of Fame inductee and 1957 US Horse of the Year, Bold Ruler.

The event was inaugurated on 22 December 1976 at Aqueduct Racetrack at a distance of six furlongs and was won by Chief Tamanaco who was ridden by US Hall of Fame jockey Angel Cordero Jr. and trained by the young trainer James Iselin, son of Philip H. Iselin who at the time was Chairman of Monmouth Park Racetrack in a time of 1:09 4/5.

In 1978 the event was scheduled to be run in early spring in April and it was raced at that time of the year until 2002. That year the event was moved to Belmont Park and held in May and was duly held then until 2009. In 2009 the event was moved to the Aqueduct Fall Meeting and has been held in late October or early November and at times returning to be scheduled at Belmont Park.

In 1982 the event was classified as Grade III, upgraded to Grade II in 1985 for five runnings before being downgraded back to Grade III in 1990.

In the 1998 running, Kelly Kip, ridden by Jean-Luc Samyn, set an Aqueduct rack record of 1:07.61 for the six furlongs distance. Samyn and Kelly Kip returned the following year to break that record, running the six furlongs in 1:07.54.

In 2009 the Bold Ruler was increased in distance to 7 furlongs.

In 2019 Maximum Security set a new stakes record for the seven furlong distance en route to being crowned the US Champion Three-Year-Old Male Horse.

In 2022 the conditions of the event were changed to a stakes race with allowances. Also the event in 2022 was moved to Aqueduct Racetrack due to infield tunnel and redevelopment work at Belmont Park and run at a shorter distance of six furlongs.

== Records ==
Speed record:

- 7 furlongs: 1:20.76 – Maximum Security (2019)
- 6 furlongs: 1:07.54 – Kelly Kip (1999)

Margins:

- 9 3/4 lengths – No Dozing (2018)

Most wins:

- 2 – Dave's Friend (1980, 1981)
- 2 – Kelly Kip (1998, 1999)
- 2 – Runninsonofagun (2022, 2024)

Most wins by a jockey:

- 3 – Ángel Cordero Jr. (1976, 1985, 1987)
- 3 – Jean-Luc Samyn (1977, 1998, 1999)
- 3 – John R. Velazquez (1994, 2001, 2010)
- 3 – Jose Lezcano (2009, 2011, 2013)
- 3 – Joel Rosario (2017, 2020, 2024)

Most wins by a trainer:

- 4 – H. Allen Jerkens (1995, 1998, 1999, 2009)

Most wins by an owner:

- 3 – Hobeau Farm (1995, 1998, 1999)
- 3 – David Jacobson (2014, 2016, 2023)

== Winners ==
Year	Winner	Age	Jockey	Trainer	Owner	Distance	Time	Purse	Grade	Ref
At Belmont Park - Bold Ruler Stakes
2026	Paradise Valley	6	Samuel Marin	Ilkay Kantarmaci	Ilkay Kantarmaci, Zilla Racing Stables, Steven Forst, America's Pastime Stables, Five Horsemen Stables and Rounds Racing	6 furlongs	1:09.16	$200,000	III	
At Aqueduct
2025	Damon's Mound	5	Junior Alvarado	William I. Mott	Cliff & Michele Love	6 furlongs	1:09.67	$175,000	III	
2024	†Runninsonofagun	5	Joel Rosario	John T. Toscano Jr.	Karen A. Zimmerman	6 furlongs	1:09.42	$175,000	III	
2023	Durante	4	Manuel Franco	David Jacobson	David Jacobson & JKX Racing	6 furlongs	1:09.78	$200,000	III	
2022	Runninsonofagun	3	Kendrick Carmouche	John T. Toscano Jr.	The Estate of Scott Zimmerman	6 furlongs	1:10.07	$200,000	III	
At Belmont Park – Bold Ruler Handicap
2021	Wondrwherecraigis	4	Luis Saez	Brittany T. Russell	Michael Dubb, The Elkstone Group, Madaket Stables & Michael Caruso	7 furlongs	1:23.31	$200,000	III	
2020	Majestic Dunhill	5	Joel Rosario	George Weaver	R. A. Hill Stable	7 furlongs	1:22.48	$93,000	III	
2019	Maximum Security	4	Luis Saez	Jason Servis	Gary & Mary West	7 furlongs	1:20.76	$200,600	III	
At Aqueduct
2018	No Dozing	4	Daniel Centeno	Arnaud Delacour	Lael Stables	7 furlongs	1:23.81	$200,000	III	
At Belmont Park
2017	Tom's Ready	4	Joel Rosario	Dallas Stewart	G M B Racing	7 furlongs	1:22.06	$200,000	III	
2016	Stallwalkin' Dude	6	Irad Ortiz Jr.	David Jacobson	David Jacobson & Head of Plains Partners	7 furlongs	1:21.66	$200,000	III	
2015	Matrooh	5	Abel Castellano Jr.	Chad C. Brown	Shadwell Racing	7 furlongs	1:21.24	$196,000	III	
2014	Salutos Amigos	4	Cornelio Velasquez	David Jacobson	David Jacobson & Southern Equine Stable	7 furlongs	1:21.87	$200,000	III	
2013	Clearly Now	3	Jose Lezcano	Brian A. Lynch	Up Hill Stable	7 furlongs	1:21.52	$200,000	III	
2012	Buffum	4	Eddie Castro	Thomas Albertrani	Godolphin Racing	7 furlongs	1:21.68	$150,000	III	
At Aqueduct
2011	Calibrachoa	4	Jose Lezcano	Todd A. Pletcher	Mike Repole	7 furlongs	1:21.32	$100,000	III	
At Belmont Park
2010	Bribon (FR)	7	John R. Velazquez	Todd A. Pletcher	Derrick Smith	7 furlongs	1:22.36	$100,000	III	
At Aqueduct
2009	Le Grand Cru	4	Jose Lezcano	H. Allen Jerkens	Judson Streicher	7 furlongs	1:22.19	$147,000	III	
At Belmont Park
2008	Lucky Island (ARG)	4	Alan Garcia	Kiaran P. McLaughlin	Shadwell Racing	6 furlongs	1:09.14	$109,100	III	
2007	Songster	4	Edgar S. Prado	Saeed bin Suroor	Godolphin Racing	6 furlongs	1:08.80	$105,400	III	
2006	Tiger	5	Eibar Coa	James A. Jerkens	Susan & John Moore	6 furlongs	1:08.49	$104,700	III	
2005	Uncle Camie	5	Richard Migliore	Michael E. Hushion	Carmine Telesca and John & Marilyn Guerrera	6 furlongs	1:08.67	$104,600	III	
2004	Canadian Frontier	5	Javier Castellano	Stanley M. Hough	Joyce Robsham	6 furlongs	1:08.97	$107,700	III	
2003	Shake You Down	5	Michael J. Luzzi	Scott A. Lake	Robert L. Cole Jr.	6 furlongs	1:08.47	$108,400	III	
2002	Left Bank	5	John R. Velazquez	Todd A. Pletcher	Michael Tabor	6 furlongs	1:09.30	$102,900	III	
At Aqueduct
2001	Say Florida Sandy	7	Joe Bravo	Juan Serey	John Rotella	6 furlongs	1:08.67	$109,200	III	
2000	Brutally Frank	6	Shaun Bridgmohan	Mitchell E. Friedman	Sunny Meadow Farm	6 furlongs	1:08.64	$109,800	III	
1999	Kelly Kip	5	Jean-Luc Samyn	H. Allen Jerkens	Hobeau Farm	6 furlongs	1:07.54	$107,400	III	
1998	Kelly Kip	4	Jean-Luc Samyn	H. Allen Jerkens	Hobeau Farm	6 furlongs	1:07.61	$110,200	III	
1997	Punch Line	7	Robbie Davis	William H. Turner Jr.	Althea Richards	6 furlongs	1:08.80	$108,300	III	
1996	Lite the Fuse	5	Julie Krone	Richard E. Dutrow Sr.	Richard E. Dutrow Sr.	6 furlongs	1:09.51	$107,500	III	
1995	Rizzi	4	Dale V. Beckner	H. Allen Jerkens	Hobeau Farm	6 furlongs	1:08.91	$107,600	III	
1994	§ Chief Desire	4	John R. Velazquez	Michael E. Hushion	Charles G. Hagedorn	6 furlongs	1:08.76	$110,500	III	
Bold Ruler Stakes
1993	Slerp	4	Jose A. Santos	Robert B. Hess Jr.	Allan L. Richie	6 furlongs	1:09.17	$117,000	III	
1992	Jolies Appeal	4	Herb McCauley	Gasper S. Moschera	John Thor	6 furlongs	1:09.29	$112,600	III	
1991	Rousing Past	4	Nick Santagata	Carlos F. Martin	Tri Noble Stable	6 furlongs	1:09.80	$112,000	III	
1990	Mr. Nickerson	4	Chris Antley	Mark J. Reid	Robert H. A. Nixon	6 furlongs	1:09.20	$110,400	III	
1989	Pok Ta Pok	4	Richard Migliore	William H. Turner Jr.	Barbara Turner	6 furlongs	1:09.80	$112,600	II	
1988	King's Swan	8	Chris Antley	Richard E. Dutrow Sr.	Alvin Akman	6 furlongs	1:10.20	$127,800	II	
1987	Pine Tree Lane	5	Angel Cordero Jr.	D. Wayne Lukas	Leonard D. Mathis	6 furlongs	1:09.00	$172,800	II	
1986	Phone Trick	4	Jorge Velasquez	Richard E. Mandella	Howell Wynne	6 furlongs	1:08.80	$117,800	II	
1985	Rocky Marriage	5	Angel Cordero Jr.	Robert J. Frankel	Sidney L. Port	6 furlongs	1:08.80	$85,650	II	
1984	Top Avenger	6	Antonio Graell	Jack D. Ludwig	John A. Franks	6 furlongs	1:09.80	$92,250	III	
1983	Maudlin	5	Jerry D. Bailey	Jan H. Nerud	Tartan Stable	6 furlongs	1:11.60	$82,500	III	
1982	Always Run Lucky	4	Jimmy J. Miranda	John P. Campo	Rockwood Stable	6 furlongs	1:09.40	$81,000	III	
1981	Dave's Friend	6	Anthony S. Black	Robert L. Beall	John A. Franks	6 furlongs	1:09.60	$80,850		
1980	Dave's Friend	5	Vincent Bracciale Jr.	Robert L. Beall	Robert L. Beall	6 furlongs	1:09.80	$81,150		
1979	Star de Naskra	4	Jeffrey Fell	Richard D. Ferris	Carlyle J. Lancaster	6 furlongs	1:09.20	$80,700		
Bold Ruler Handicap
1978	Half High	5	Angel Santiago	Edward J. Coletti Sr.	Leon J. Hekimian	6 furlongs	1:09.40	$42,775		
1977	Jaipur's Gem	4	Jean-Luc Samyn	Philip G. Johnson	Jacqueline Crotty	6 furlongs	1:09.60	$36,750		
1976	Chief Tamanaco	3	Angel Cordero Jr.	James Iselin	Great Wolf Hill Farm	6 furlongs	1:09.80	$36,250		

Notes:
§ Ran as an entry
† In 2024, My Buddy B won the race but was disqualified to second after stewards ruled she had bumped and interfered with Runninsonofagun in the stretch run.

== See also ==
List of American and Canadian Graded races
