= Jean-Luc Samyn =

Jockey in American Thoroughbred horse racing

Personal information
- Born: November 6, 1956 (age 69) Bailleul, Nord, France
- Occupation: Jockey

Horse racing career
- Sport: Horse racing
- Career wins: 2,612 (through 4/15/11)

Major racing wins
- American Derby (1978); Brooklyn Handicap (1978, 1986); Black Helen Handicap (1980, 1982); Lexington Handicap (1980); Roamer Handicap (1980); Stars and Stripes Handicap (1980, 1984); Manhattan Handicap (1981); Violet Handicap (1981, 1982, 1983, 1985, 1987); Kelso Handicap (1982, 1990, 2000); Discovery Handicap (1982, 1991); Man o' War Stakes (1982); Caesar's International Handicap (1982); Coaching Club American Oaks (1983); Diana Handicap (1983, 1991); Pan American Handicap (1983); Canadian International Stakes (1985); Haskell Invitational Handicap (1985); First Flight Handicap (1986, 2001, 2002); Flower Bowl Invitational Stakes (1986, 1992, 1993, 2000); Massachusetts Handicap (1986); Sword Dancer Invitational Handicap (1991, 2000, 2003); Queen Elizabeth II Challenge Cup Stakes (1993); Tremont Stakes (1996); Champagne Stakes (1999); Turf Classic Invitational Stakes (2000); Damon Runyon Stakes (2004)

Significant horses
- Skip Trial, Kiri's Clown, Influent, John's Call, Kelly Kip

Jean-Luc Samyn (born November 6, 1956, in Bailleul, Nord, France) is a jockey in American Thoroughbred horse racing.

The son of a pastry chef, Jean-Luc Samyn was one of three children. At age thirteen, he went to work for the stable of trainer John Cunnington at Chantilly, a racecourse about 50 kilometers (31 mi) north of Paris city center. He apprenticed for five years and on September 7, 1975, earned his first career win at the racecourse in Compiègne.

After a visit to the United States, Jean-Luc Samyn returned permanently to compete. In 1976, he was the top apprentice jockey at Garden State Park in Cherry Hill, New Jersey, and then at Keystone Racetrack in Bensalem, Pennsylvania. In 1977, Samyn relocated to race at New York Racing Association tracks where he has been based ever since. He and his wife Antoinette eventually made their home in Manhasset, New York.

In New York, Jean-Luc Samyn immediately began winning important stakes races and in 1984 rode Play On to a 2nd-place finish in the Preakness Stakes then won with the colt in that year's Withers Stakes. Samyn had a long a successful association with the late U.S. Racing Hall of Fame trainer, Philip G. Johnson, winning more than four hundred races together.

On November 20, 1985, Jean-Luc Samyn rode in the Japan Cup at Tokyo Racecourse, then immediately flew to Los Angeles, California, where he rode in the Matriarch Stakes at Hollywood Park Racetrack. According to his NTRA biography, this is believed to be the first time a jockey has ridden in a stakes race on different continents on the same day. In 2000, Samyn swept New York's final prep races for the three Breeders' Cup turf races with wins in the Flower Bowl Invitational Stakes, Turf Classic Invitational Stakes, and the Kelso Handicap.

During his more than thirty-year career in American flat racing, Jean-Luc Samyn has earned wins in a number of major New York races including the Grade I Flower Bowl Invitational Stakes a record four times. He has also won national Grade I events at Gulfstream Park in Florida, Keeneland Race Course in Kentucky, Monmouth Park Racetrack in New Jersey, and at Woodbine Racetrack in Toronto, Ontario, Canada.

As at 2009, Samyn is the dean of New York's jockey colony.

== Selected other career wins ==
- Bold Ruler Handicap (1977, 1998, 1999)
- Firenze Handicap (1977)
- Bernard Baruch Handicap (1978, 1990)
- Carter Handicap (1978, 1984, 1994)
- Matchmaker Stakes (1979, 1982)
- Nassau Stakes (1982)
- Excelsior Handicap (1983)
- Gazelle Handicap (1983, 1990)
- Lamplighter Handicap (1983, 1989)
- Red Smith Handicap (1983, 2004, 2006)
- Aqueduct Handicap (1984)
- Long Island Handicap (1984, 1986)
- Mount Vernon Stakes (1984)
- Prioress Stakes (1984)
- Withers Stakes (1984)
- Top Flight Handicap (1985)
- Bed O' Roses Handicap (1986)
- Northern Dancer Breeders' Cup Turf (1987)
- Knickerbocker Handicap (1989)
- Saranac Handicap (1989 (2), 1998)
- Lawrence Realization Stakes (1991)
- Jamaica Handicap (1992)
- Fort Marcy Handicap (1993, 1997, 2000)
- Cliff Hanger Handicap (1994, 1999)
- Tom Fool Handicap (1994)
- Ladies Handicap (1995)
- Bunty Lawless Stakes (1996)
- Sanford Stakes (1996)
- Virginia Derby (1996)
- Bowling Green Handicap (1997, 2003)
- Comely Stakes (1997, 1999)
- Maker's Mark Mile Stakes (1997)
- Alfred G. Vanderbilt Handicap (1998)
- Frank J. De Francis Memorial Dash (1998)
- Jerome Handicap (1998)
- Peter Pan Stakes (1999)
- Remsen Stakes (1999)

| Chart (2000–2002) | Peak position |
|---|---|
| National Earnings List for Jockeys 2000 | 51 |
| National Earnings List for Jockeys 2002 | 87 |
