= Happy Zero =

Hong Kong-based racehorse

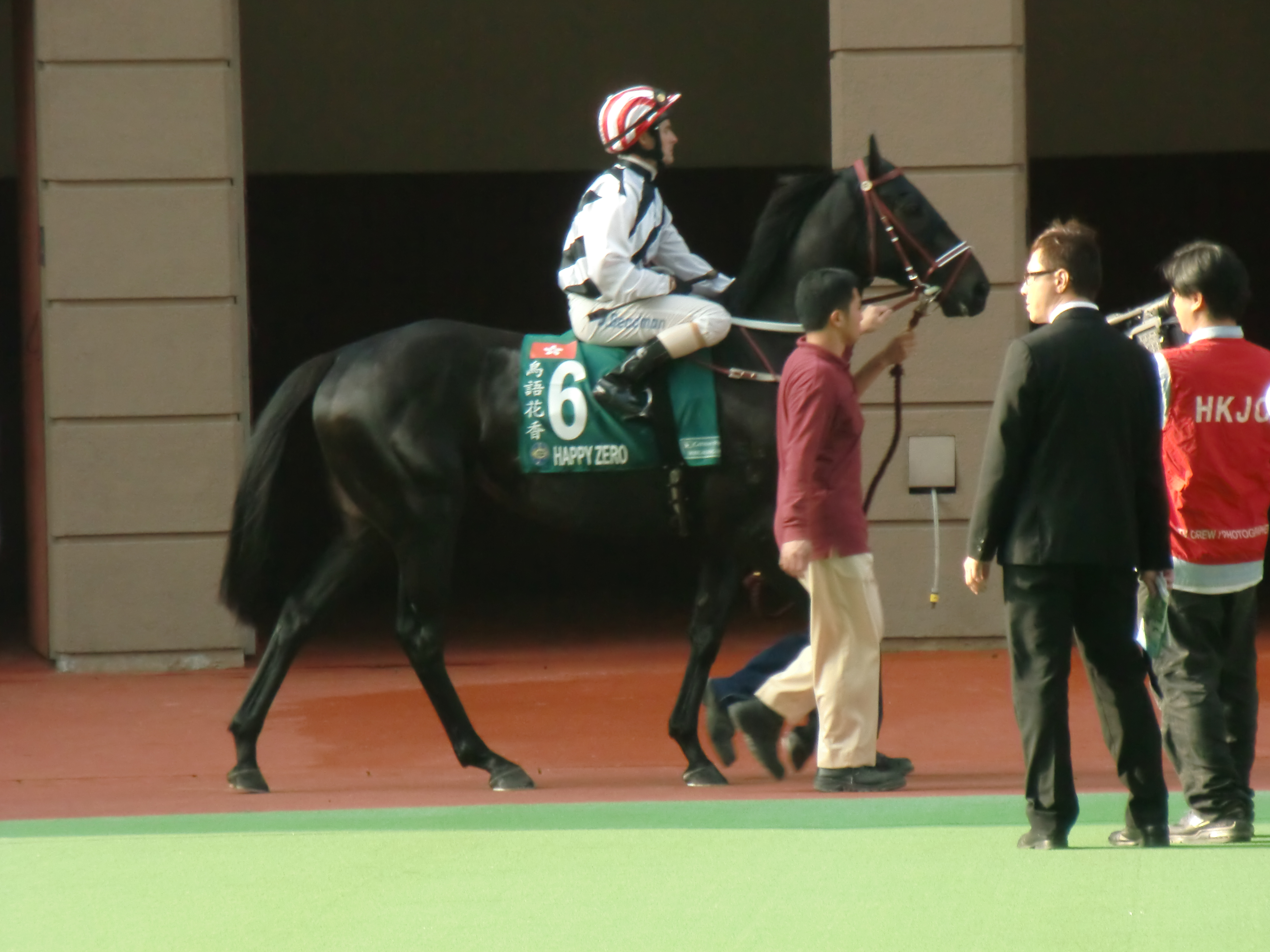
Happy Zero

Happy Zero (Chinese: 鳥語花香; foaled 1 November 2004) is a Hong Kong–based retired Thoroughbred racehorse.

In the 2009-2010 season, he won the HKG1 Queen's Silver Jubilee Cup. He also is one of the nominees of Hong Kong Horse of the Year.

== Profile ==
- Sire: Danzero
- Dam: Have Love
- Dam's Sire: Canny Lad
- Sex: Gelding
- Country : New Zealand
- Colour : Brown
- Owner : David Philip Boehm
- Trainer : John Moore
- Record : (No. of 1-2-3-Starts) 8-1-3-17 (As of 27 February 2012)
- Earnings : HK$13,509,426 (As of 27 February 2012)
