= Bel Air Racetrack =

Defunct horse racing facility in Maryland, US

- Location: Bel Air, Maryland, United States
- Coordinates: 39.525703°N 76.356702°W
- Date opened: 1870
- Date closed: 1962

Bel Air Racetrack was a horse racing facility located one mile north of Baltimore Pike and east of Tollgate Road in Bel Air, Maryland. The 100-acre site was originally plotted in 1870 but was later improved and expanded in 1936 by new owner Ray Bryson to include a 3/4-mile race track, new starting gate, and larger grandstands. The track flourished until the 1940s when the owners became embroiled in political efforts to close the track.

After Bryson died in 1958, the state legislature eventually prevailed and the track closed in 1962. The property is now the site of Harford Mall.
