= Big Four of Maryland Thoroughbred racing =

Maryland-based Thoroughbred trainers

The Big Four of Maryland Thoroughbred racing were four American Thoroughbred horse trainers who dominated horse racing in the state of Maryland in the 1960 and 1970s and who helped modernize flat racing training.

The "Big Four" label evolved within the racing community and the media as a way to recognize the influence of trainers John J. Tammaro, Jr. (1925–2001), Richard E. Dutrow, Sr. (1937–1999), King T. Leatherbury (born 1933), and Hall of Fame inductee, Grover G. "Bud" Delp (1932–2006).
