= Prospect Bay, Nova Scotia =

Community in Nova Scotia, Canada

Coordinates: 44°31′00″N 63°46′54″W

Prospect Bayin Nova Scotia

Prospect Bay is a community in the Canadian province of Nova Scotia, located on the Chebucto Peninsula in the Halifax Regional Municipality. Major landmarks include The Boat Yard Marina and Lounge, Prospect Foods, and the Christopher Webb Art Gallery and Studio.

== Communications ==
- Telephone exchange 902 - 852
- First three digits of postal code - B3T

== Demographics ==
- Total Population 684
- Total Dwellings 294
- Total Land Area 8.435 km^{2}
