= Vineyard Haven (horse) =

American-bred Thoroughbred racehorse

- Sire: Lido Palace
- Dam: Princess Aloha
- Damsire: Aloha Prospector
- Sex: Stallion
- Foaled: 2006
- Country: United States
- Colour: Grey
- Breeder: Double S Farm
- Owner: Godolphin Racing
- Trainer: Saeed bin Suroor
- Record: 7: 4-0-1
- Earnings: $671,500

Major wins
- Champagne Stakes (2008); Hopeful Stakes (2008); Frank J. De Francis Memorial Dash (2009)
- Last updated on November 27, 2009

Vineyard Haven, foaled 2006, is grey roan American Thoroughbred racehorse, sired by Lido Palace out of Princess Aloha. He is trained by Saeed bin Suroor and is owned by Godolphin Racing.

Vineyard Haven is a multiple Grade 1 stakes winner, and qualified for the Breeders' Cup Juvenile with his victory in the Champagne Stakes on October 4, 2008.
