= Thor's Echo =

American Thoroughbred racehorse

- Sire: Swiss Yodeler
- Grandsire: Eastern Echo
- Dam: Helen of Troy
- Damsire: Mr. Integrity
- Sex: Gelding
- Foaled: 2002
- Country: United States
- Colour: Chestnut
- Breeder: Fast Lane Farms (Steve Warner), Carleton Block & Harry Forman
- Owner: 1) Royce S. Jaime & Pablo Suarez; 2) Sheikh Rashid (2007)
- Trainer: Douglas F. O'Neill
- Record: 20: 5-4-5
- Earnings: $2,416,990

Major wins
- WinStar Derby (2005); Frank J. De Francis Memorial Dash (2006) Breeders' Cup wins: Breeders' Cup Sprint (2006)

Thor's Echo (foaled February 19, 2002 in California) is an American Champion Thoroughbred racehorse best known for becoming only the second California-bred horse to ever win a Breeders' Cup race.

Thor's Echo began racing at age two and in 2005 as a three-year-old he won the WinStar Derby. In 2006, he had an outstanding year, winning the Frank J. DeFrancis Memorial Dash Stakes and finishing second in both the Dubai Golden Shaheen and the Ancient Title Stakes. In his second to last start of the year, he won the most important race of his career, the Breeders' Cup Sprint. Seeing that another Grade 1 victory might secure the Eclipse Award, his connections entered him in the DeFrancis Dash (that year run at the end of November), which he won. Thor's Echo's 2006 performances earned him American Champion Sprint Horse honors.

In 2007 Thor's Echo was sold to Sheikh Rashid, the eldest son of the very prominent owner/breeder, Sheikh Mohammed bin Rashid Al Maktoum of Dubai. Brought to race at Nad Al Sheba Racecourse in Sheikh Rashid's native Dubai, Thor's Echo was beaten in two starts before being sent back to his American trainer, Doug O'Neill. Based at Hollywood Park Racetrack, Thor's Echo suffered an injury that kept him out of racing for most of the last half of 2007.
