= Egyptian Ra =

New Zealand-bred racehorse

- Sire: Woodborough
- Dam: Egyptian Queen
- Sex: Gelding
- Foaled: 18 November 2003
- Country: New Zealand
- Colour: Chestnut
- Owner: Cheng Keung Fai
- Trainer: Anthony S. Cruz
- Record: 56:9-8-7-
- Earnings: HKD$20,611,250
- Last updated on 18 March 2011

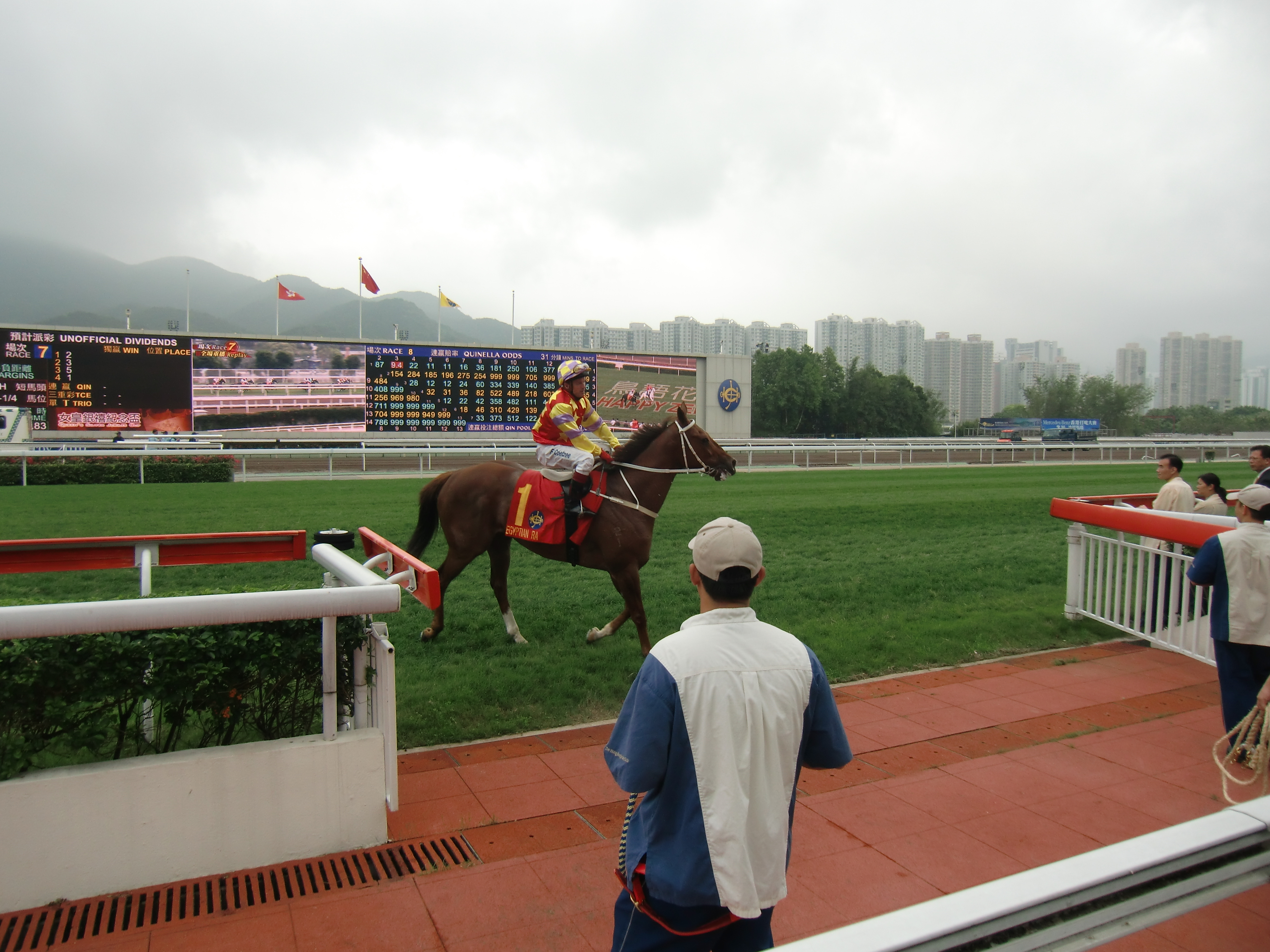
Egyptian Ra rided by Felix Coetzee, Queen's Silver Jubilee Cup

Egyptian Ra (Chinese: 再領風騷; foaled 18 November 2003) is a Hong Kong–based retired Thoroughbred racehorse. In the season of 2008–2009, Cruz, the trainer, had improved this seven-year-old an improbable 16 points from a mark of 110 to 126 on the ratings list and a place among the world's best thoroughbreds with an international rating of 119. Egyptian Ra also is one of the nominees of Hong Kong Horse of the Year.
