= May 1970 =

Month of 1970

<<	May 1970					>>
Su	Mo	Tu	We	Th	Fr	Sa
					1	2
3	4	5	6	7	8	9
10	11	12	13	14	15	16
17	18	19	20	21	22	23
24	25	26	27	28	29	30
31

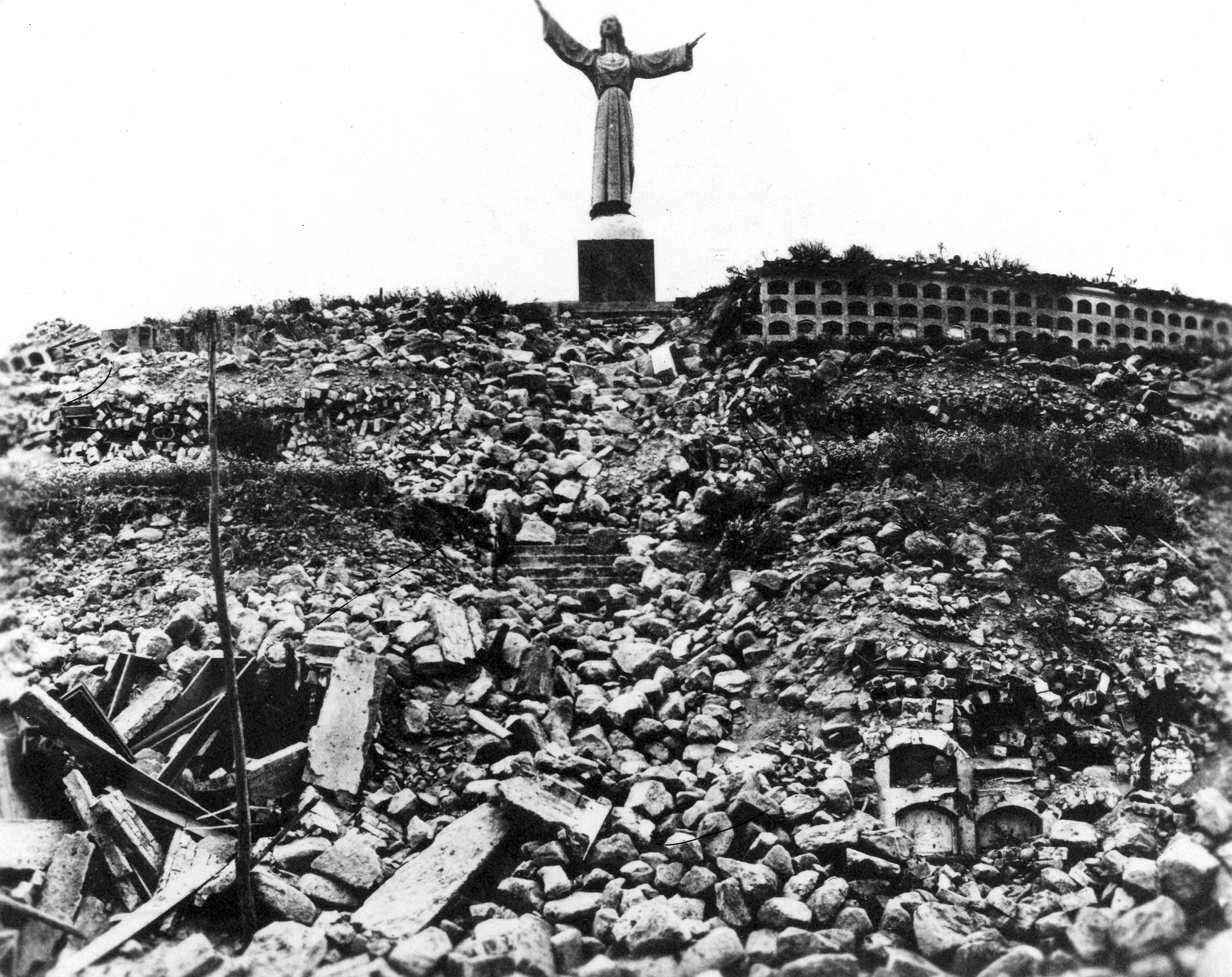
May 31, 1970: Earthquake in Peru kills more than 65,000 people, buries 16,000 people alive in Yungay (pictured above)

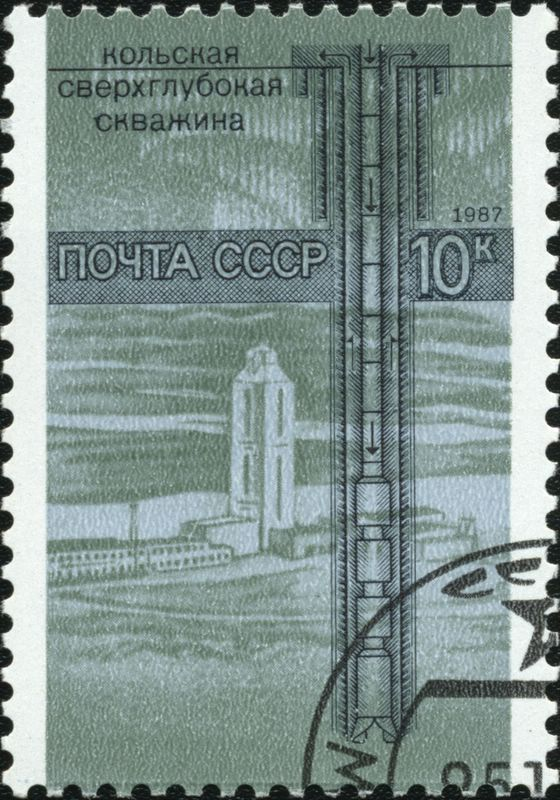
May 24, 1970: Soviet Union begins digging a hole 12 kilometers into the Earth

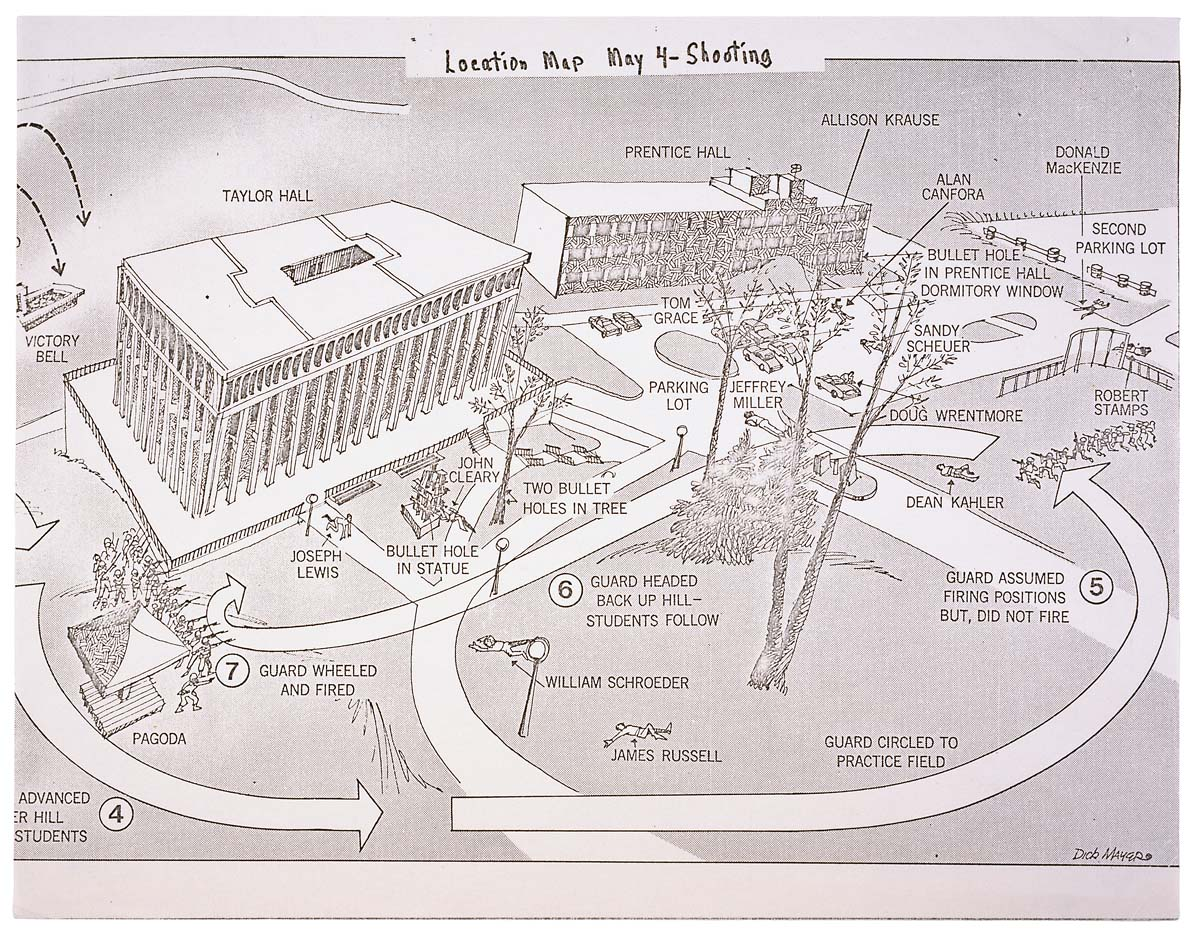
May 4, 1970: Four college students killed, nine wounded, by Ohio National Guardsmen at Kent State University

The following events occurred in May 1970:

== May 1, 1970 (Friday) ==
- At 7:30 in the morning local time (0030 UTC) 8,000 United States Army troops followed South Vietnam's Army of the Republic of Vietnam (ARVN) troops into Cambodia's Kampong Cham Province, and expanding the American involvement in the Vietnam War to attack North Vietnamese Army (NVA) enclaves in an area known as the Fishhook . Helicopters and ground troops of the U.S. Army's 1st Air Cavalry Division and an ARVN airborne brigade caught the NVA off guard, while troops of the 25th Infantry Division drove their attack northward and westward; by May 3, the United States would claim 467 of the enemy had been killed, and only eight American soldiers Simultaneously with the invasion, U.S. President Richard Nixon was preparing to announce the invasion in a nationwide address, which began at 0200 UTC (9:00 in Washington, DC on Thursday night). Protests against the expansion of the Vietnam War began on American college campuses later in the day on Friday. For the first time in more than 50 years, the U.S. Senate Foreign Relations Committee voted to ask for a meeting with a U.S. president, after having been given no notice of the invasion, and the request was unanimous from both political parties.
- At Yale University in New Haven, Connecticut, demonstrations against the trial of the New Haven Nine, Bobby Seale, and Ericka Huggins (all of the Black Panthers activist group) drew a crowd of 12,000. Although city merchants were prepared for an anticipated riot. and 4,000 U.S. Army and U.S. Marine troops were deployed to nearby bases "as a precautionary measure" the rally was relatively peaceful.
- U.S. Army physician Dr. Jeffrey R. MacDonald was formally charged by the Army with three counts of murder, after an investigation implicated him in the February 17 murder of killing of his wife and two daughters at their home at Fort Bragg, North Carolina.
- Born: Dave Willis, American cartoon producer and voice actor, co-creator of Aqua Teen Hunger Force; in Wichita Falls, Texas
- Died:
  - Ralph Hartley, 81, American inventor, electrical engineer and mathematician who conceived the Hartley transform and who invented the Hartley oscillator
  - Yi Eun, 72, the last Crown Prince of Korea during the reign of his older brother, the Emperor Sunjong from 1907 until the annexation of Korea by Japan in 1910. Yi Un, who had been the head of the House of Yi since the 1926 death of the last Emperor of Korea, his older brother Sunjong, had been allowed to live in South Korea since November 22, 1963 after President Park Chung Hee allowed him to return from Japanese exile. Yi Eun, seriously ill, was allowed to live in a home on the grounds of Changdeok Palace, one of the former Korean royal family residences in Seoul, and would be buried at the royal family tomb site. His 38-year-old son, Yi Ju became the new head of the former royal house.
  - William L. St. Onge, 55, U.S. Congressman for Connecticut since 1962. Mr. St. Onge had been on his way to the shipyards at Groton to be a guest of honor at the launching of a new submarine, when he collapsed from a heart attack.

== May 2, 1970 (Saturday) ==
- Twenty-two passengers and one crew member on ALM Flight 980 drowned when the Overseas National Airways DC-9 jet ran out of fuel and made a forced landing in the Caribbean Sea, 33 miles (53 km) from the nearest land, the island of Saint Croix in the United States Virgin Islands. The Antillean Airlines flight had departed New York City at 11:00 a.m. for St. Maarten, with 57 passengers and a crew of six, and, after two unsuccessful attempts at landing at Juliana Airport, was cleared for an emergency landing at St. Croix and ditched in the ocean at 3:48 p.m. Forty survivors able to depart the plane and were rescued by helicopters from the U.S. Coast Guard, the U.S. Navy and the U.S. Marines, while the other 23 were trapped on the sinking airplane.
- In the aftermath of a protest the evening before, an estimated 500 students from Kent State University (KSU) went off campus after midnight and into the streets of downtown Kent, Ohio, smashing windows of local businesses and of cars parked on the street, prompting the imposition of an 8:00 p.m. curfew for Saturday night. Five police officers were injured, and 14 students were arrested before tear gas was used to disperse the crowd at 3:00 a.m. Later in the day, a group of 600 protesters set fire to the ROTC building on the KSU campus, prompting Kent mayor Leroy M. Satrom to ask for the Ohio National Guard; 400 guardsmen were dispatched from nearby Akron and deployed on campus.
- Dust Commander, a thoroughbred racehorse that had been purchased for a bargain price of $6,500 by his owner, won the Kentucky Derby by five lengths. In addition to winning jockey Mike Manganello, the Derby was also the first American Triple Crown race to include a female jockey. Diane Crump, riding Fathom, came in 15th of 17 horses. Holy Land with no jockey to ride him, came in last, after throwing Hector Pilar prior to the final turn.
- Darrell Pace of Hamilton, Ohio, who would become a legend in the sport of archery, went to an archery range for the first time (at the age of 13) and discovered that he was "unusually good at aiming" a bow and arrow. Within three years, he would win the first of four world championships, and would become a gold medalist at the 1976 and 1984 Olympic games. In connection with its centennial celebration in 2011, the World Archery Federation honored him as "Archer of the Century."
- U.S. Senator Ralph Yarborough, at one time one of the most powerful members of the U.S. Senate, was defeated by former Congressman Lloyd Bentsen, Jr. in a statewide primary election to determine the Democratic Party nominee. On the same day, Congressman and future U.S. President George Bush won the Republican Party nomination for the Senate seat by an almost 7 to 1 margin over his challenger, University of Plano founder Robert J. Morris.

== May 3, 1970 (Sunday) ==
- Blessed Leonardo Murialdo of Turin, a 19th-century advocate in Italy for labor reform and the creation of educational institutions, was canonized as a Saint in the Roman Catholic Church by Pope Paul VI. Thousands of members of the order founded by Murialdo, the Congregation of St. Joseph, made the pilgrimage to Rome to attend the ceremony.
- Born: Bobby Cannavale, American comedian and television actor known for Will & Grace and Boardwalk Empire), winner of two primetime Emmy Awards; in Union City, New Jersey

== May 4, 1970 (Monday) ==
- At 12:24 in the afternoon, four college students were shot and killed at Ohio's Kent State University, and nine others wounded by Ohio National Guardsmen, during a protest against the incursion into Cambodia. Around noon, the Guardsmen fired tear gas into the crowd of 500 protesters, and some demonstrators threw rocks and threw back tear gas grenades. According to an eyewitness, one student threw a rock as the Guardsmen were turning away to leave the area and "one section of the Guard turned around and fired and then all the Guardsmen turned around and fired." A later investigation determined that about 28 members of the Guard had fired their rifles, with 61 shots in the space of 13 seconds. Eight National Guardsmen would be indicted in 1973 for the shooting, and would be acquitted. On May 1, 2007, a student's audio of the recording would be released that included the moment that the command was given to prepare to fire. After the killings, several eyewitnesses said that the initial gunshots, that might have led the Guardsmen to believe they were under attack, had been an ill-timed warning shot fired by a 21-year-old student who was working as an informant for the campus police and for the FBI.
- On the same day, seven members of the U.S. Army's 101st Assault Helicopter Battalion were killed in the mid-air collision of a Huey UH-1H and a Cobra AH-1G during a practice Red Alert at Fire Support Base Kathryn in the Thua Thien province of South Vietnam. Six Army members and one U.S. Marine were killed in the Quang Tin province, and two other Marines and seven from the Army died in other provinces, for a total of 24 deaths in the war that day.
- In Chicago, on the 84th anniversary of the Haymarket bombing that killed seven police officers and four civilians, Mayor Richard J. Daley unveiled the restored Haymarket Square Statue, seven months after it had been destroyed by a bomb placed by the Weather Underground organization. Five months later, on October 6, the Weathermen group would destroy it again with another bomb.
- Born: Will Arnett, Canadian TV actor and comedian known for 30 Rock and Arrested Development; in Toronto
- Died: Jeffrey Miller, 20; Allison Krause, 19; Sandra Lee Scheuer, 20; and William Knox Schroeder, 19, American students at Kent State University. Miller and Krause were participating in an anti-war demonstration, while Scheuer and Schroeder were walking to class, when the four were shot and killed by members of the Ohio National Guard.

== May 5, 1970 (Tuesday) ==
- The Sahaja Yoga religious movement was founded at the village of Nargol in India's Gujarat state, after Nirmala Srivastava reported her discovery of what she described as "the technique to open the Sahasrara chakra, the energy centre located at the crown of the head" and making it "possible for anyone to experience self-realization". The decades that followed, Sahaja Yoga centers have been established worldwide, reportedly in 80 countries.
- Prince Norodom Sihanouk, who had been deposed as the reigning monarch of Cambodia on March 12, announced from Beijing that he had formed a government-in-exile that would ally with the Communist government of China and the Cambodian Khmer Rouge to overthrow head of state Lon Nol. Sihanouk's group of 11 ministers in waiting was called "GRUNK", and acronym for Gouvernement Royal d'Union Nationale du Kampuchéa (Royal Government for the National Union of Kampuchea, the Khmer name for Cambodia) and was a coalition of government officials exiled in China (former premier Penn Nouth as the Prime Minister) and Khmer Rouge leaders within Cambodia, chief of whom was Khmer Rouge leader Khieu Samphan).
- The Hekla volcano in southern Iceland erupted, raining ashes and debris within at 30 mi (48 km) radius and forcing the evacuation of the surrounding villages. Hekla had last erupted in 1948; since the 1970 event, the eruptions have happened every ten years.
- Born: Todd Newton, American game show host known for Family Game Night; in St. Louis
- Died: Chris Ross, 24, American stand-up comedian and TV actor who was a member of the San Francisco improv group The Committee

== May 6, 1970 (Wednesday) ==
- Twenty-seven members of the U.S. Army's 101st Airborne Division were killed when North Vietnamese attackers overran their encampment at Fire Base Henderson, located in South Vietnam 16 miles (26 km) south of the Demilitarized Zone (DMZ). The pre-dawn assault on the American fire support base in the Quang Tri Province, near Cam Lo, lasted for 45 minutes; three South Vietnamese Army soldiers also died. Most of the dead were from the 2nd Battalion of the 501st Infantry Regiment. The deaths marked the highest loss of American soldiers in a single day's action since 1968.
- The first wristwatch to use an LED display, the Pulsar watch, was introduced by the Hamilton Watch Company with a demonstration on The Tonight Show. After being told that the Pulsar's retail price was $1,500 (equivalent to $9,970 in 2019), Johnny Carson quipped, “The watch will tell you the exact moment you went bankrupt!”
- Yūichirō Miura of Japan became "The Man Who Skied Down Everest" (the title of a 1975 film) when he skied down the Lhotse face of Mount Everest after starting from the South Col at an altitude of more than 24,000 feet (7,300 m). Reaching a peak speed of 93.6 miles per hour (150.6 km/h) Miura covered a distance of 1.8 miles (2.9 km) in two minutes and 20 seconds, and used a parachute to slow to a stop at the end of his run.
- In Ireland, Finance Minister Charles Haughey and Agriculture Minister Neil Blaney were dismissed from the cabinet by Prime Minister Jack Lynch, after accusations of their involvement in a plot to import weapons for use in Northern Ireland by the Provisional IRA. Both men would be found not guilty of the charges. Haughey would later become Taoiseach (Prime Minister), while Blaney would never again be selected to serve as a Minister.
- Underdog Feyenoord of Rotterdam defeated Celtic F.C. of Glasgow, 2–1, to win the European Cup. The win came in the second period of extra time, on a goal by Ove Kindvall.
- Died: Giovanni Giuriati, 83, Italian fascist politician who served as Minister of Public Works for Benito Mussolini and was President of Italy's Chamber of Deputies from 1929 to 1934

== May 7, 1970 (Thursday) ==
- Leadership of the west African nation of Dahomey (now Benin) was transferred to a civilian control by a three-man presidential council, with the unusual feature of rotating the presidency for two-year terms among all three of the leading candidates in the March election. In addition to rotating the job, each man had his own cabinet of ministers. Souza picked former president Hubert Maga to serve the first two years as chief executive, concluding that Maga would have won if the election had not been suspended. After two years, Maga turned over the main presidency to former prime minister Justin Ahomadégbé-Tomêtin with the former president Sourou-Migan Apithy to serve the final two-years of the rotating presidency. Ahomadégbé served less than six months. Major Mathieu Kérékou led a coup in 1972, deposing the presidential council and placing all three presidents under house arrest.
- The U.S. Federal Communications Commission gave notice of the new Prime Time Access Rule, to go into effect on September 1, 1971, restricting TV networks to only three hours of evening programming (from 8:00 to 11:00 pm) and allowing the network affiliates an extra half hour to air their own programming. At the time, the weeknight network prime time schedule began at 7:30 p.m. Eastern.

== May 8, 1970 (Friday) ==
- A group of 500 construction workers attacked a group of 1,000 student protesters outside of New York City Hall, near the intersection of Wall Street and Broad Street. The students, mostly from Pace University, had marched up Wall Street and were at a rally outside the municipal offices when the men, wearing their hard hats, "barged through City Hall Park at 1 p.m. and nearly overwhelmed a force of some 50 cops stationed on the perimeter of City Hall", and more than 60 people were injured.
- One month after The Beatles had officially broken up, their 12th and final album, Let It Be was released.
- The New York Knicks won their first National Basketball Association championship, defeating the Los Angeles Lakers, 113–99, in Game 7 of the championship series at New York's Madison Square Garden. Despite tearing a muscle in his thigh muscle four days earlier, Willis Reed chose to start the game for the Knicks and, with a shot of carbocaine and cortisone to help him endure severe pain, remained in until shortly before halftime, "inspiring his teammates merely with his presence on the court", and Walt Frazier scored 36 points. The Knicks led 69–42 at the half in a game which New York City residents could only watch on tape delay.
- Jose Figueres Ferrer was inaugurated as the 36th President of Costa Rica, in the fourth consecutive peaceful transition of power since the restoration of democracy in the Central American republic. With the exception of two periods of military rule, Costa Rican presidents have been inaugurated on May 8 for four year terms since 1890.
- Born:
  - Naomi Klein, Canadian author and activist, known for the bestseller This Changes Everything: Capitalism vs. the Climate; in Montreal
  - Luis Enrique (Luis Enrique Martinez), Spanish soccer football manager of Spain's national team since 2018, and midfielder for Spain from 1991 to 2002; in Gijón
  - Michael Bevan, Australian cricketer and batsman for Australia national team from 1992 to 2004; in Belconnen, ACT

== May 9, 1970 (Saturday) ==
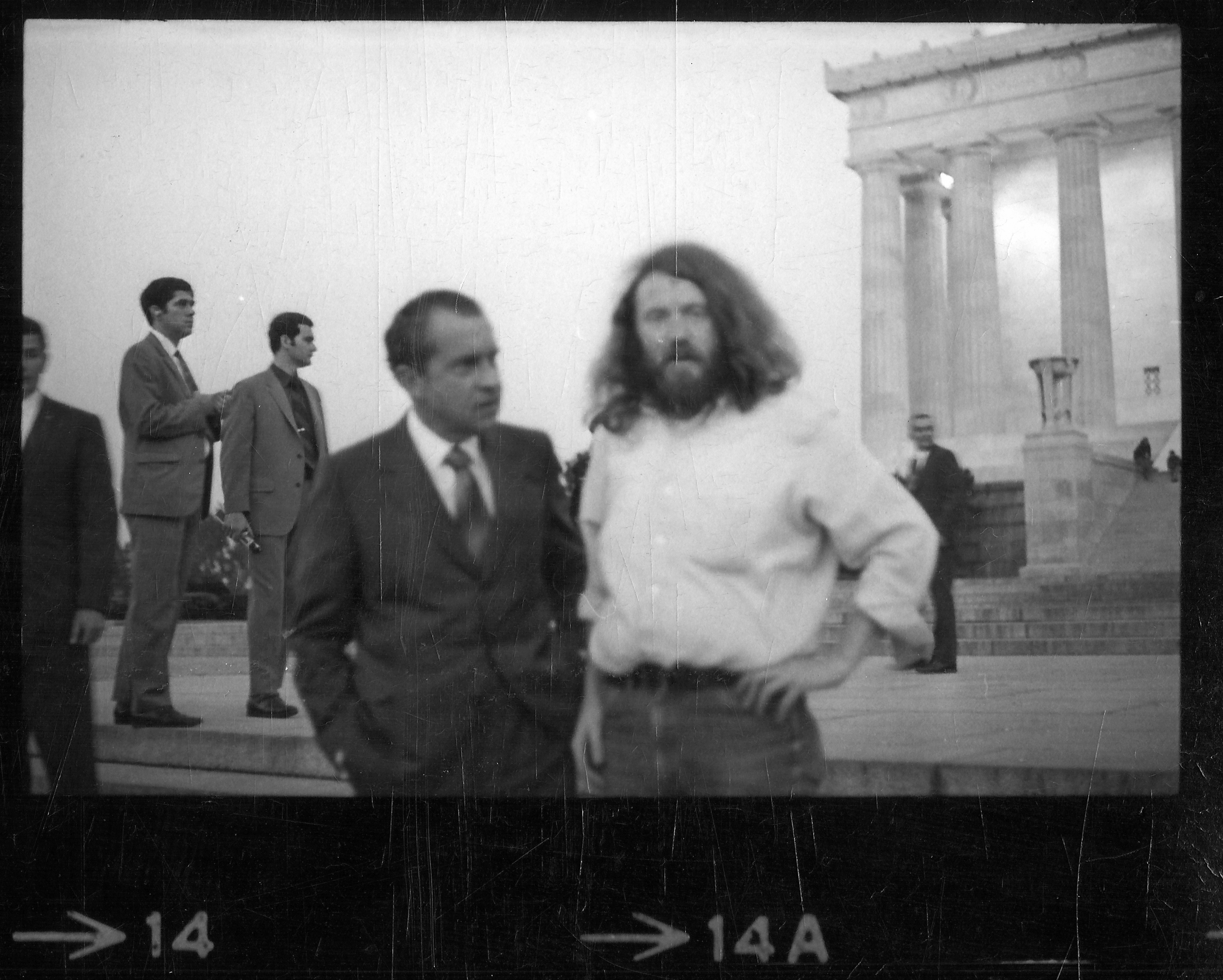
Nixon at the Lincoln Memorial with student protester Bob Moustakas

- Hours before a large anti-war protest began at Washington, D.C., U.S. President Nixon surprised most of his Secret Service bodyguards and about eight demonstrators by walking into the Lincoln Memorial at 4:55 in the morning. The Associated Press described it as a "strange encounter, unique in recent political annals," which began after Nixon woke up his valet, Manolo Sanchez, and asked him to come along on a visit. As word got around that the President was chatting with students, the group had increased to 50 by the time he left, and his parting words were "Go shout your slogans on the Ellipse. Just keep it peaceful." Later in the day, a crowd of about 100,000 demonstrated peacefully in the event organized by the New Mobilization Committee to End the War in Vietnam, one of many anti-war protests that took place across the nation that day.
- U.S. Vice President Spiro Agnew traveled to Atlanta for ceremonies to dedicate the Confederate Memorial Carving at Georgia's Stone Mountain Park. Although a crowd of 100,000 had been expected by organizers, only 10,000 showed up, and the American vice president called for national unity by imploring the listeners to avoid what he called "the new slavery", which he described as "the willingness of some to become slaves to their passions, devoid of reason and individuality."
- A transit of Mercury (the planet Mercury passing directly between the Sun and the Earth) took place. The Sun-Mercury-Earth alignment happens 13 times in a century and had last taken place on November 7, 1960; it would happen again on November 10, 1973.
- Born: Ghostface Killah (stage name for Dennis Coles), American rapper and actor; in Staten Island, New York City, New York

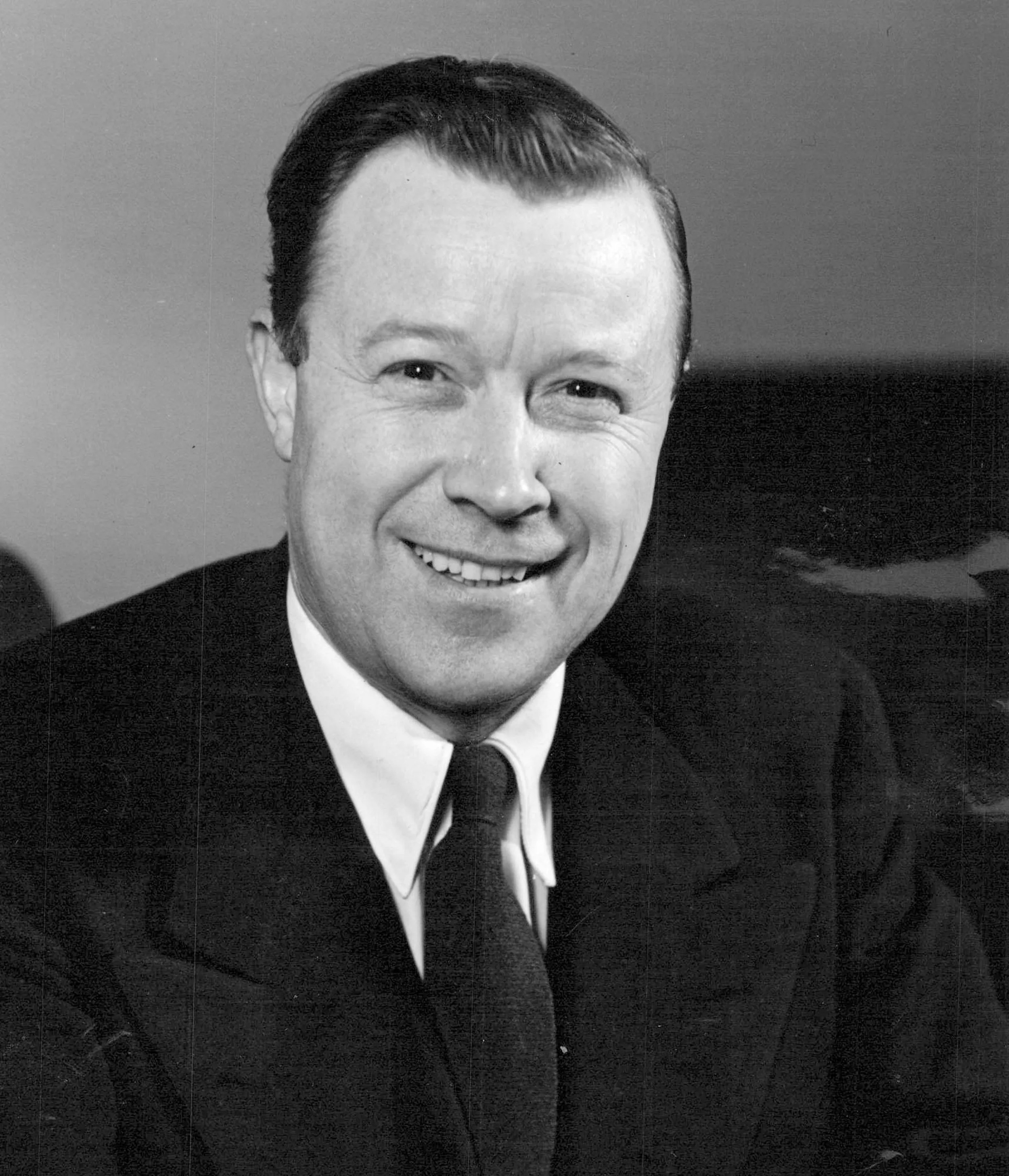
Reuther

- Died: Walter P. Reuther, 62, President of the United Auto Workers since 1946, was killed in a plane crash, along with his wife and four other people. Reuther's chartered Learjet had departed Detroit for Pellston, Michigan, from which he was planning to travel to the UAW's new training facility at Onaway. While making its approach to Pellston's airport in a rainstorm, the jet clipped a tree top and crashed in the woods about 1.5 miles (2.4 km) from the runway, killing all six people aboard.

== May 10, 1970 (Sunday) ==
- The Boston Bruins won their first Stanley Cup since 1941, when Bobby Orr scored a goal 40 seconds into overtime for a 4–3 victory, completing a four-game sweep of the St. Louis Blues.
- Born: Craig Mack, American rapper and hip-hop producer for Bad Boy Records; in Bronx, New York City, New York (d. of heart failure, 2018)

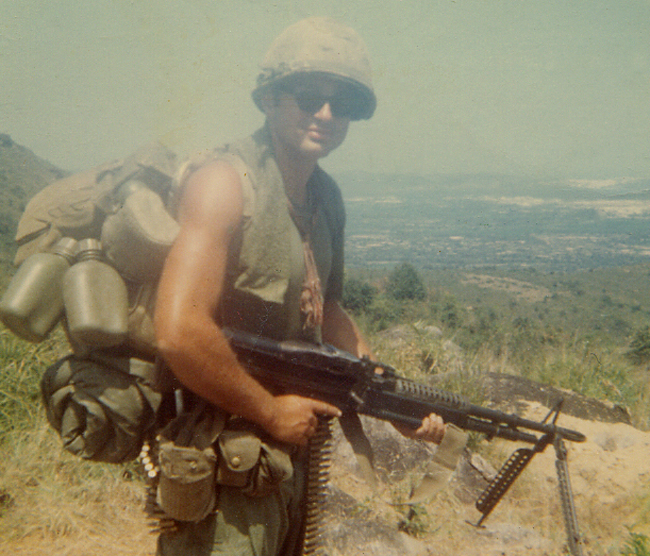
Spec 4 Sabo

- Died:
  - U.S. Army Specialist Four Leslie H. Sabo Jr., 22, was killed while protecting other members of his reconnaissance team at Se San in Cambodia. He would be nominated for the Medal of Honor but, because the paperwork was misplaced for decades, would not be recognized until 2012.
  - Mari Blanchard, 47, American film and television actress known for 1953's Abbott and Costello Go to Mars; from cancer

== May 11, 1970 (Monday) ==
- A tornado killed 26 people after it touched ground in downtown Lubbock, Texas and then swept a path of destruction through the businesses and then into residential neighborhoods. One twister brought a hailstorm at 8:30 p.m. local time, but the larger and more destructive tornado touched down at 19th Street and University Avenue at 9:35 just as sirens were sounding, and initially swept a path 1.5 miles (2.4 km) wide, damaging 15 square miles (39 km^{2}) of the city of about 149,000 people. A review after the storm showed that the first fatality was the collapse of a home at 10th Street and S Avenue, followed by eight people in a neighborhood along 4th Street. More than 500 people were injured and the damage estimated at $250,000,000 ($1.66 billion in 2019). An estimated 80% of plate glass windows downtown were smashed, and severe damage and destruction included 430 houses; 600 apartments; 250 businesses; 10,000 motor vehicles and 119 aircraft. The "Fujita scale", which ranks wind speeds from F0 to F5, was developed from data gathered from the storm by Dr. Ted Fujita of the University of Chicago, who gave the tornado the first F5 rating.
- 1970 Augusta riot begins
- Born: Heather Stefanson, Canadian politician, Premier of Manitoba since 2021; in Winnipeg
- Died:
  - Johnny Hodges, 62, African-American alto saxophonist for Duke Ellington's band
  - Henry D. Marrow, 23, African-American murder victim

== May 12, 1970 (Tuesday) ==
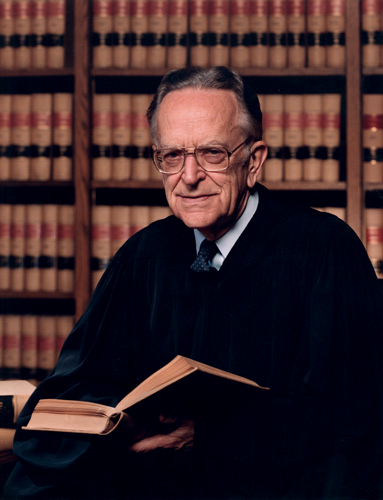
Justice Blackmun

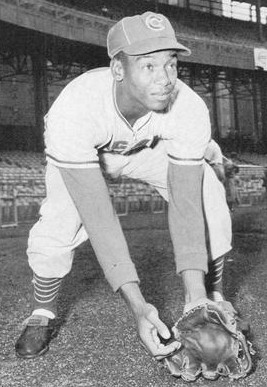
Ernie Banks

- Judge Harry A. Blackmun was confirmed unanimously (94 to 0) by the United States Senate to fill the vacancy that had existed for more than a year on the United States Supreme Court. After the resignation of Abe Fortas in 1969, the Senate declined to approve the next two nominees, Clement F. Haynsworth, Jr. and G. Harrold Carswell.
- At Wrigley Field, Ernie Banks of the Chicago Cubs became only the ninth player in Major League Baseball history to hit at least 500 home runs. The 500th homer, made before 5,264 fans in the second inning of a 4–3 win over the Atlanta Braves, also brought him the milestone of exactly 1,600 runs batted in Banks, who had started his career in Negro league baseball with the Kansas City Monarchs before joining the Cubs in 1953, would retire after the 1971 season and finish his career with 512 home runs.
- Consisting of only 15 words, United Nations Security Council Resolution 279 was passed unanimously by all 15 members, who were meeting in an emergency session. As a reporter noted at the time, "the council decided to debate later and act first after Spain introduced the shortest resolution on record: 'The Security Council demands the immediate withdrawal of all Israeli armed forces from Lebanese territory."

Montreal

Denver

- The International Olympic Committee chose Montreal as the site for the 1976 Summer Olympics, after it appeared that Moscow would receive the bid. On the first ballot, no bidder got the required 35 vote majority, but Moscow had 28, Montreal 24 and Los Angeles 17, and the Soviet news agency TASS issued an erroneous bulletin celebrating Moscow as the victor. After the IOC narrowed the candidates to two, Montreal received 41 votes and Moscow 28. The 1976 Winter Olympics were awarded to Denver, with the American city finishing ahead of Canada's Vancouver; Sion, Switzerland; and Tampere in Finland. Denver voters would reject funding for the games in a 1972 referendum, and the games would be held instead in the Austrian city of Innsbruck.
- Died:
  - Nelly Sachs, 78, German Jewish playwright. She was awarded the Nobel Prize in Literature in 1966.
  - Major General John A. B. Dillard, 50, and Colonel Carroll E. Adams, Jr., 46, were among ten U.S. Army members killed when the UH-1 helicopter they were traveling in was shot down by enemy gunfire near Pleiku in South Vietnam. Colonel Adams was posthumously promoted to the rank of brigadier general.
  - Lieutenant General Władysław Anders of the Army of Poland, 77, commander of the 25,000 member "Anders' Army" during World War II

== May 13, 1970 (Wednesday) ==
- Trial began in Düsseldorf, West Germany, against Franz Stangl for war crimes committed while he was the Commandant of the Treblinka concentration camp during the Second World War. Stangl had been arrested in Brazil on February 18, 1967, after being tracked down by Nazi-hunter Simon Wiesenthal, who described him as third on his list of most wanted missing war criminals (after Martin Bormann and Heinrich Müller). On December 22, Strangl would be convicted of complicity in the murder of 400,000 Jews at Treblinka; the charges did not include those of an additional 450,000 people murdered during Stangl's earlier administration of the Sobibor extermination camp. He would be sentenced to life imprisonment. Stangl lived for only six more months after his seven-month long trial, and was found dead of a heart attack in his prison cell on June 28, 1971.
- Died: Bill Dobell, 70, Australian portrait and landscape artist

== May 14, 1970 (Thursday) ==
- West German terrorist Andreas Baader escaped from incarceration after only 40 days in jail, the day after a permissive prison warden approved his request to be allowed to visit a library to do research "on a book on youthful criminals". Baader and his co-author, Ulrike Meinhof, had signed a book contract. Guarded by two prison attendants, Baader was taken to West Berlin's Deutsches Zentralinstitut für Soziale Fragen (The German Central Institute for Social Questions), where Meinhof joined her friend in the reading room. A few minutes later, two additional women (later identified as Irene Goergens and Ingrid Schubert) forced their way into the reading room at gunpoint. During the gun battle that followed, the four conspirators escaped out a window and drove away. The group created the Red Army Faction, known commonly as "The Baader-Meinhof Gang". Although Baader and Meinhof would be arrested in 1972 and commit suicide in prison, the Red Army Faction would continue to commit crimes until 1998.
- U.S. President Nixon signed a bill expanding the national school lunch program's coverage to 50% more students, providing a free (or reduced price) lunch for schoolchildren whose family income was below the poverty line ($3,968 for a family of four in 1970) Weighted Average Poverty Thresholds for Families, 1960–2012. Lunch prices for eligible students could not exceed 20 cents (equivalent to $1.30 in 2019)
- Born: Daniel Lewin, American-born Israeli mathematician, internet entrepreneur and member of IDF special forces unit Sayeret Matkal; in Denver. Lewin is known for being the first casualty of 9/11, when he was stabbed to death on American Airlines Flight 11 before it was hijacked and flown into the North Tower of the World Trade Center.
- Died: Billie Burke, 85, American stage, film, radio and TV actress, best known for portraying Glinda the Good Witch in The Wizard of Oz

== May 15, 1970 (Friday) ==
- In the second day of demonstrations at the predominantly-black Jackson State College in Jackson, Mississippi, state law enforcement officers rained gunfire on a college dormitory shortly after midnight, killing two students and injuring 12. A group of 40 Mississippi State Police expended 150 rounds of ammunition in firing into the rooms at Alexander Hall women's residence and into the crowd of demonstrators, after claiming to have seen a sniper at a window on the building's top floor, but no sniper was ever located.

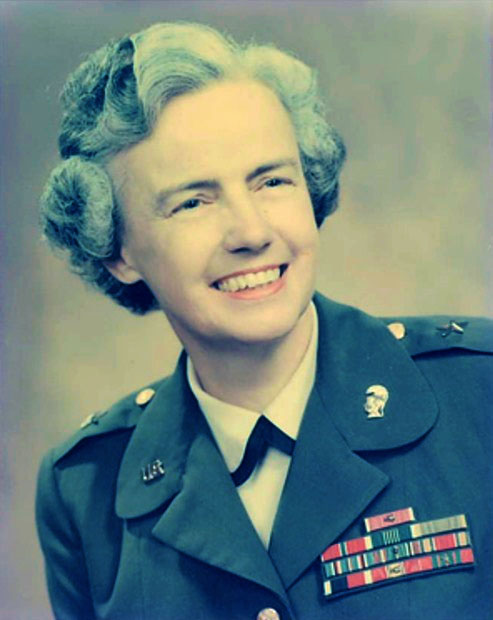
Hoisington

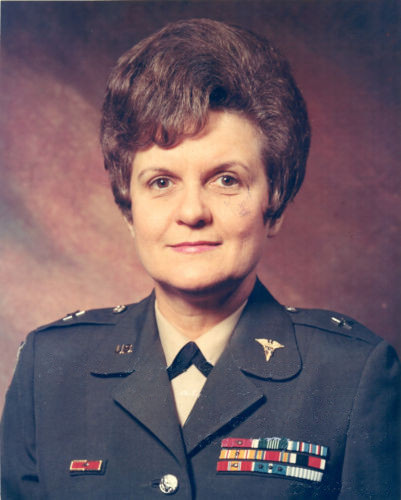
Hays

- Two women were nominated to become the first female generals in the history of the U.S. armed forces. U.S. Army Colonel Elizabeth P. Hoisington was the commander of the Women's Army Corps and Colonel Anna Mae Hays, chief of the U.S. Army Nurse Corps were nominated by President Nixon to be promoted to the rank of brigadier general.
- The 138th, and last, original episode of the TV spy spoof Get Smart was broadcast at 7:30 Eastern Time, bringing an end to the show after five seasons.
- Born:
  - Frank de Boer, Dutch soccer football defender with 112 appearances on the Netherlands national team; in Hoorn
  - Ronald de Boer, twin brother of Frank de Boer, Dutch soccer football midfielder with 67 appearances on the Netherlands national team; in Hoorn
  - Rod Smith, American football wide receiver, inductee of College Football Hall of Fame, with 14 seasons for the NFL Denver Broncos; in Texarkana, Arkansas
- Died: Phillip Gibbs, 21, and James E. Green, 17, from wounds sustained in the shooting of 14 African-American protesters at Jackson State College.

== May 16, 1970 (Saturday) ==
- The first fatal injury ever sustained by a spectator at a Major League Baseball game occurred when a 14-year old fan, Alan Fish, was struck by a foul ball while at Dodger Stadium in Los Angeles Fish was sitting in the second row along the first base line and, in the third inning, a foul ball hit by Manny Mota struck him in the head. After getting treated at the stadium's first aid station, Fish returned to his seat to watch the remainder of the Dodgers' 5–4 loss to the Giants. As his headaches got worse, he was admitted to the children's hospital and lapsed into a coma the next day, and died four days after being struck.
- Born: Gabriela Sabatini, Argentine tennis player, winner of the Women's Tennis Association finals (1988 and 1994), the Wimbledon doubles title and the U.S. Open singles title (1990); in Buenos Aires

== May 17, 1970 (Sunday) ==
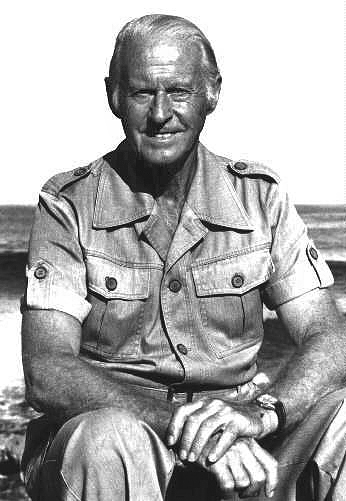
Thor Heyerdahl

- Thor Heyerdahl and his crew of seven men and a monkey departed from the harbor at Safi, Morocco on Heyerdahl's 8-ton boat made of papyrus, the Ra II, in an attempt to prove that the ancient Egyptians could have crossed the Atlantic Ocean more than 5,000 years before the voyage of Christopher Columbus. In 1947, Heyerdahl had become famous for the successful Kon-Tiki expedition, sailing a raft of balsa logs across the Pacific Ocean, but in 1969, his first Ra expedition failed the papyrus boat became water-logged less than two months later. Heyerdahl's second voyage, of about 4,000 miles (6,400 km) reached Barbados on July 12, 1970.
- In the Dominican Republic presidential election, Joaquin Balaguer was re-elected, polling more votes than his four challengers combined, including Vice President Francisco Lora and Elías Wessin y Wessin, who led the 1963 coup that had ousted President Juan Bosch.
- Hank Aaron of the Atlanta Braves became the ninth Major League Baseball player to have 3,000 hits, reaching the milestone in his first at bat against pitcher Wayne Simpson of the Cincinnati Reds. Later in the game at Cincinnati, Aaron hit his 570th home run, but the Reds won the game, 7 to 6.
- Born:
  - Jordan Knight, American-Canadian vocalist, lead singer for New Kids on the Block; in Worcester, Massachusetts
  - Fadwa Souleimane, Syrian actress and anti-government activist during the Syrian Civil War; in Aleppo (d. of cancer, 2017)
- Died: Heinz Hartmann, 75, Austrian-born American psychoanalyst

== May 18, 1970 (Monday) ==
- In Minneapolis, Minnesota a senior deputy clerk of Hennepin County District Court, administered oaths to Michael McConnell and Jack Baker after taking down their information on an application for a marriage license. Baker, a law student at the University of Minnesota, had determined that since state law did not prohibit a marriage between people of the same gender, he and his partner would have the same rights as a man and a woman. The deputy clerk, Robert Anderson, had the gentlemen swear that the information on the license application was true, and advised that his office would consult Hennepin County attorney for advice whether the license to wed could be issued. Hennepin County Attorney George M. Scott recommended on May 22 that the license be denied and, referring to a law requiring a marriage license to be issued in the county in which the woman resides, and a 1949 case noting that it was the duty of the state to guard marriage "in the conservation of public morals". To permit two males to marry, Scott concluded, would "result in an undermining and destruction of the entire legal concept of our family structure in all areas of law." District court clerk Gerald R. Nelson stated that he would abide by Scott's recommendation and deny the license In 1971, McConnell and Baker were granted a license in Blue Earth County, Minnesota and a marriage ceremony was performed; though challenged, it was never invalidated.
- At the request of Prime Minister Harold Wilson, Queen Elizabeth II ordered the dissolution of the Parliament of the United Kingdom and set the date for elections for a new House of Commons for Thursday, June 18.
- Eleven missing fishermen from Cuba were found on William Island, an uninhabited isle, by a search plane from the Bahamas. A week earlier, the men had been rescued, and then held captive, by the militant Cuban exile group Alpha 66. After the Cuban government refused Alpha 66's proposal to release the fishermen in return for the release of Alpha 66 guerrillas captured on April 17, the militants freed their hostages on the small islet, located a mile from the rocky western side of the largest of the Bahamian islands, Andros.
- Born: Tina Fey, American comedian and actress known as creator of 30 Rock and as head writer for Saturday Night Live; as Elizabeth Stamatina Fey in Upper Darby Township, Pennsylvania

== May 19, 1970 (Tuesday) ==
- The "Bikini alert state" system was first used within the United Kingdom's Ministry of Defence to indicate the level of a threat to UK national security. The system is analogous to the DEFCON indication of defense readiness condition used by the United States Department of Defense, but uses five colors rather than numbers.
- "Barbapapa", a best-selling children's book series and television cartoon in France and other European nations (and in nations in Africa where French is an official language), was created by French architect Annette Tison and her American partner, Talus Taylor at a restaurant in Paris. Tison and Taylor would later say that the name for the title character had been inspired by a child who had asked his parents to buy him “barbe-à-papa” (cotton candy) at a store in the Luxembourg Gardens.
- Born:
  - K. J. Choi (Choi Kyung-Ju), South Korean professional golfer and winner of the 2011 PGA players Championship in Wando, South Jeolia Province
  - Jason Gray-Stanford, Canadian television actor best known as Randy Disher on Monk; in Vancouver
- Died: Ray Schalk, 77, American baseball player and catcher, inductee to the Baseball Hall of Fame

== May 20, 1970 (Wednesday) ==
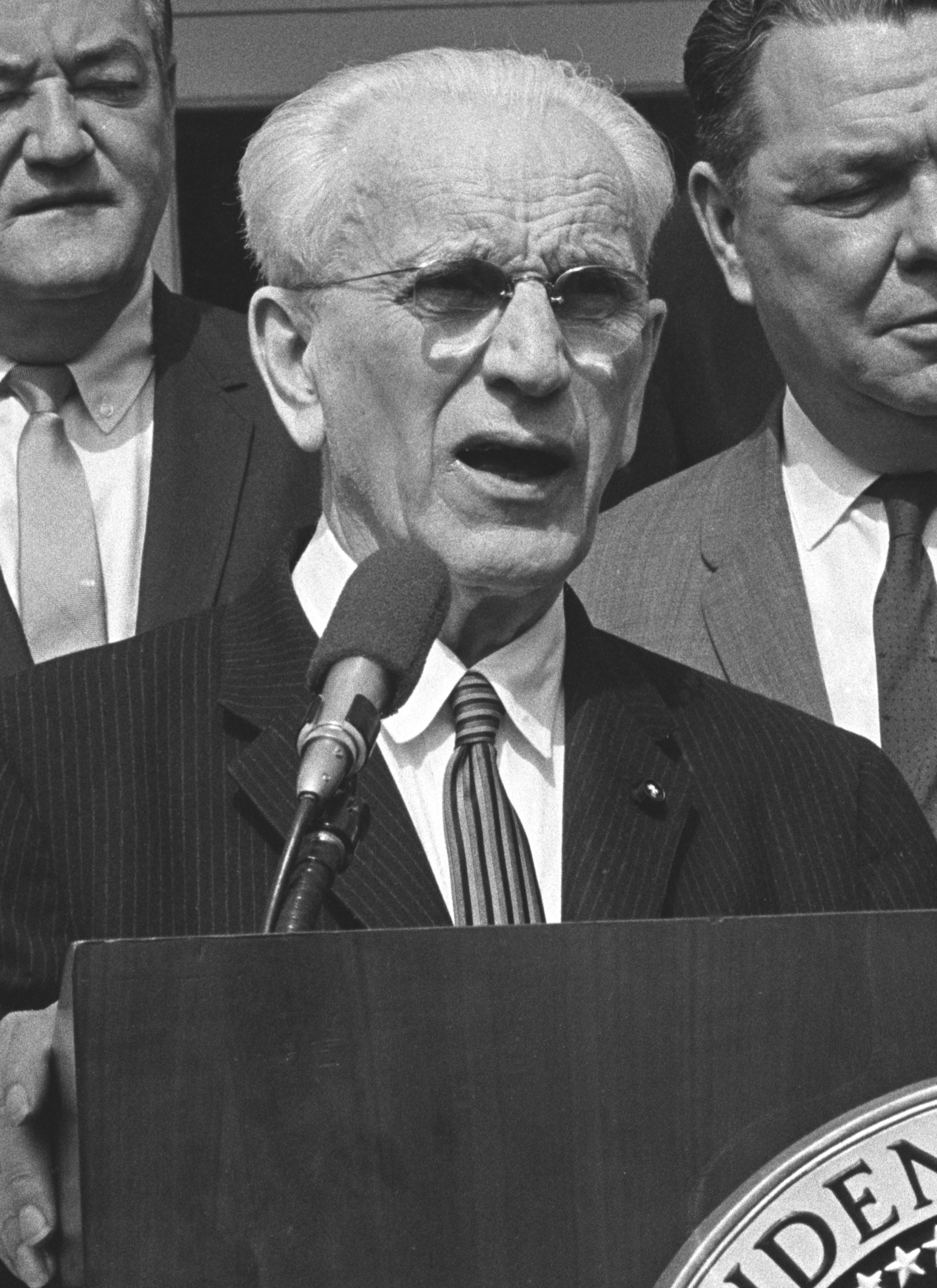
Speaker McCormack

Sudan's old flag

The new flag

- John W. McCormack, the U.S. Speaker of the House Representatives, announced that he would not run for re-election and would retire after 42 years as a Massachusetts congressman. McCormack, first elected in 1928, had been elected Speaker after the 1961 death of Sam Rayburn. House Majority Leader Carl Albert of Oklahoma was considered by the press to be the likely successor if the Democratic Party retained control of the House in the 1970 elections.
- At a session in Belize City, the legislature of the colony of British Honduras (now Belize) voted to approve the name "Belmopan" for the new capital located at the former logging center of Roaring Creek. "Belmopan" was a portmanteau for Belize and for the Mopan people, the Mayan tribe indigenous to the area.
- Nearly two weeks after the "Hard Hat Riot" broke up an anti-war student protest at New York's City Hall Park, a pro-war rally attracted 150,000 people to the same location, with a crowd that included blue collar workers and union members who supported the Nixon administration's policies in the Vietnam War.
- Chinese Communist Party Chairman Mao Zedong, the de facto leader of the People's Republic of China, issued a statement to his people for the first time in five years, with Radio Peking delivering the word to listeners nationwide. Urging Chinese citizens to work together "to defeat U.S. imperialism" in Vietnam and Cambodia, Mao's statement declared, “People of the world, unite and defeat the U.S. aggressors and all their running dogs!” Mao went on to say that "[U.S. President] Nixon's fascist atrocities have kindled the raging flames of the revolutionary mass movement" and added that "The Chinese people firmly support the revolutionary struggle of the American people", predicting that "the fascist rule in the United States will inevitably be defeated." Mao's statement was read aloud the next morning to an anti-U.S. rally that brought 500,000 loyal supporters to Tiananmen Square in Beijing.
- The African nation of Sudan adopted a new flag in advance of the first anniversary of Gaafar Nimeiry's "May Revolution" that brought him to power in 1969, and in time for the hosting of President Nasser of Egypt and President Gaddafi of Libya to discuss Arab unity. The new flag incorporated the four Pan-Arab colors (green, red, white and black).
- Based on a computer simulation in 2010 of the flight data from Apollo 13, an analyst has determined that if the ill-fated mission had failed to return to Earth following the April 13 explosion of one of its oxygen tanks, the spacecraft would have returned to Earth orbit after drifting for five weeks, traveling 350,000 miles (560,000 km) away from the Earth before its path brought it close enough to the Moon's gravitational field to propel it back toward Earth. According to the simulation by Analytical Graphics, Apollo 13 would have re-entered the Earth's atmosphere on May 20 and would have been incinerated. Previous predictions had been that the Apollo 13 astronauts would have missed the Earth by 40,000 miles (64,000 km) and drifted in space indefinitely.
- Born: Louis Theroux, Singapore-born British-American journalist and BBC documentary producer; in Singapore

== May 21, 1970 (Thursday) ==
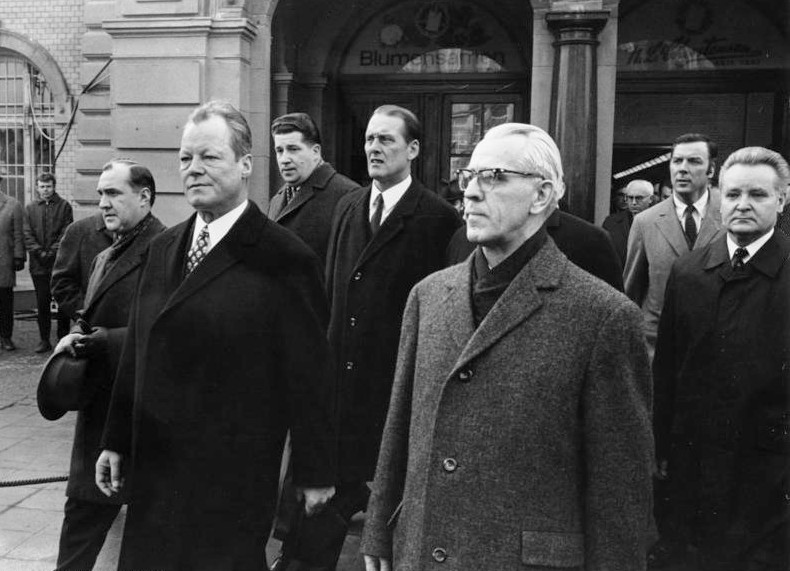
Willy Brandt and Willi Stoph

- Willi Stoph, the head of government of East Germany, became the first East German leader to travel to West Germany. Under tight security, Stoph, the Chairman of the Council of Ministers, met with West German Chancellor Willy Brandt, two months after Brandt had visited him at Erfurt on March 19. Even with the presence of several hundred West German police, a crowd of about 6,000 protesters blocked Stoph from a ceremony to lay a wreath at Kassel's memorial to the victims of Nazi fascism.
- Died: E. L. Grant Watson, 84, Australian novelist and biologist

== May 22, 1970 (Friday) ==
- Eight children and 3 adults were killed in Israel when their school bus was attacked by a group of Palestinian terrorists, who fired three bazooka rockets into the vehicle after it departed from the Avivim settlement near Israel's border with Lebanon. A twelfth victim would die, 43 years later, from an infection from a piece of shrapnel that had lodge in her brain. The group claimed that the attack was made in revenge for the Bahr El-Baqar primary school bombing by the Israeli Air Force in Egypt on April 8, which had killed 34 children. Israel responded to the attack on its children by bombarding the Lebanese towns of Bint Jbeil, Yaroun, Aitaroun and Blida, killing 20 civilians.
- Born:
  - Naomi Campbell, English supermodel and actress; in London
  - Brody Stevens, American stand-up comedian and Comedy Central host; in Los Angeles (committed suicide, 2019)
- Died: Joseph Wood Krutch, 76, American theater critic and conservationist

== May 23, 1970 (Saturday) ==
- The 120-year old Britannia Bridge, a historic landmark that connected the Welsh island of Anglesey to the British mainland, was heavily damaged and rendered impassable when two teenagers accidentally set it afire. The tubular bridge across the Menai Strait had been built by structural engineer Robert Stephenson and had carried rail traffic since 1850. Although the island's 57,000 residents could still drive across the strait on the Menai Suspension Bridge, the primary source of Anglesey's economy—the use of the port of Holyhead to transport cargoes between the United Kingdom and Ireland—was shut down by the loss of the railroad. A reconstructed bridge would finally open to rail traffic on January 30, 1972, after British Rail's spending of £3,250,000, equivalent to GBP £49,858,000 or US$61,000,000 in 2019.
- Born: Matt Flynn, American musician and drummer for Maroon 5; in Woodstock, New York

== May 24, 1970 (Sunday) ==
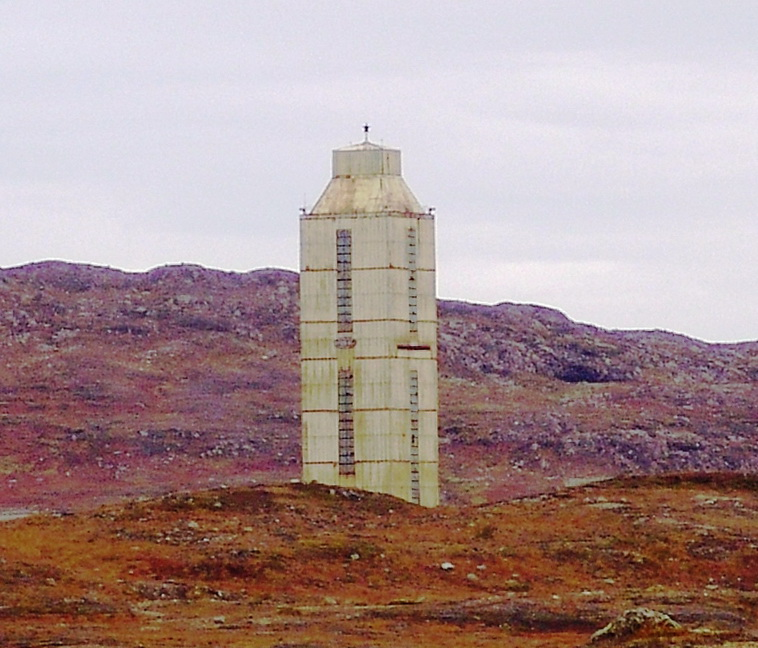
The drilling station at Kola

- The drilling of the Kola Superdeep Borehole began in the Soviet Union, at a research station above the Arctic Circle outside of the town of Zapolyarny in Russia's Murmansk Oblast. After their initial success, the Soviets revealed the plan a year later. By the time of the project's halting in 1994, the drilling had reached a depth of 40,230 feet (12,260 m), or 7.618 miles below the Earth's surface. The borehole itself is only 9 inches (230 mm) in diameter. At that depth, however, the temperature was 356 °F (180 °C), far higher than predicted, and the drilling columns had broken, making further drilling impractical.
- Born: Jeff Zgonina, American football defensive tackle with 17 seasons for seven NFL teams; in Chicago

== May 25, 1970 (Monday) ==
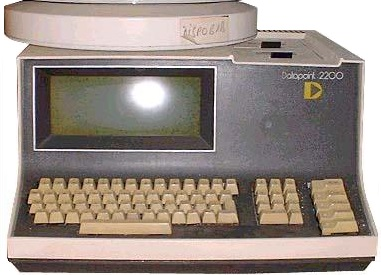
The Datapoint 2000

- The first sale of a programmable desktop computer was made when the Computer Terminal Corporation (CTC) sold 40 of its Datapoint 2200 computers to the General Mills Company of Minnesota. The original Datapoint had eight kilobytes (8K) of internal memory and its data could be stored on cassette tapes that could hold 130 KB capacity. Most of the machines were leased to buyers at a cost of $168 per month for each unit (equivalent to $1,100 per month in 2019), or sold for $1,280 ($8,500 equivalent) apiece.
- More than two weeks after the New York Knicks defeated the Los Angeles Lakers to win the NBA championship, the Indiana Pacers defeated the Los Angeles Stars (described in the L. A. Times as "the orphans of pro basketball") in Game 6 to win their first American Basketball Association title. The Pacers' Roger Brown, who never played in the NBA but would later be inducted into the Basketball Hall of Fame, scored 45 points on seven 3-point shots and 11 regular baskets, for a 111 to 107 win before a crowd of 8,233— the most fans to ever see the Stars play in Los Angeles. George Stone, whose pro career was limited to the ABA, was the high scorer for the Stars, who moved to Salt Lake City for the 1970-71 ABA season to become the Utah Stars.
- Two days before its conclusion, the 1970 London to Mexico World Cup Rally auto race suffered a fatality when driver Henri "Ido" Marang, was killed, and his co-driver Paul Coltelloni was seriously injured. Marang and Coltelloni had completed about 14,000 miles (23,000 km) of a 16,000-mile (26,000 km) journey and were in last place among 26 vehicles. Marang was driving his Citroën at high speed near Penonomé in Panama when a businessman pulled his car out in front of them.
- Born:
  - Jamie Kennedy, American television comedian; in Upper Darby Township, Pennsylvania
  - Lindsay Greenbush and Sidney Greenbush, American child actresses who played the role of Carrie Ingalls on television's Little House on the Prairie for seven seasons, starting at age 3; in Los Angeles.

== May 26, 1970 (Tuesday) ==
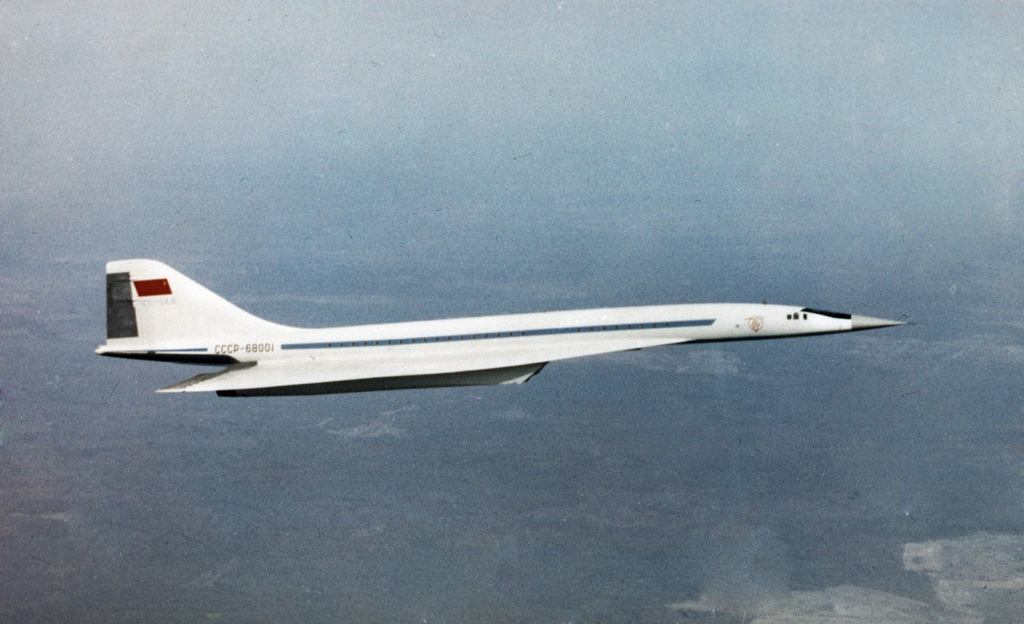
Capable of Mach 2 (RIA Novosti filephoto)

- In the Soviet Union, the Tupolev Tu-144 became the first airplane designed for passenger transport to exceed Mach 2. At an altitude of more than 10 miles (16 km), where the speed of sound is less than the 767 miles per hour (1,234 km/h) at sea level, the Tupolev Tu-144 reached a speed of 1,336.5 miles per hour (2,150.9 km/h). "No passenger plane in the world has ever flown at such a speed," the Soviet news agency TASS wrote in its press release about the supersonic jet, flown by test pilot Eduard Yelyan.
- Born:
  - John Hamburg, American film screenwriter and director; in Manhattan, New York City
  - Nobuhiro Watsuki, Japanese manga artist known for the popular Rurouni Kenshin series; in Tokyo
- Died: R. V. C. Bodley, 78, English army officer, anthropologist and journalist

== May 27, 1970 (Wednesday) ==
- Despite predictions for a close vote, in parliamentary elections in Ceylon (now Sri Lanka), the result was an overwhelming loss of seats for the ruling United National Party (UNP) and Prime Minister Dudley Senanayake. The Sri Lanka Freedom Party (SFLP) gained 50 seats, while the UNP lost 49. Having gone from having a 66 to 41 advantage, to having only 17 seats in the 151 seat House of Representatives, Senanayake resigned the next day. SFLP leader and former prime minister Sirimavo Bandaranaike, whose party had a 91-seat majority in the House, resumed her leadership of the government the day after.
- Two British mountain climbers, Don Whillans and Dougal Haston, became the first people to scale the south face of Annapurna I, reaching top of the 26,504 ft (8,078 m) peak as part of an 11-man British expedition team. The first people to reach Annapurna-1, Maurice Herzog and Luis Lachhenal of France, had ascended by way of the less difficult north face route in 1950.
- Driving a Ford of Britain Escort, the team of Finland's Hannu Mikkola and Sweden's Gunnar Palm won the World Cup Rally. Mikkola and Palm had been sponsored by the London tabloid The Daily Telegraph and arrived at the finish line in Mexico City, 38 days after 96 vehicles had departed London for a distance of 16,000 miles (26,000 km). With transit assisted by ferry boats, the vehicles raced through Europe and then through South America and Central America to reach their destination. Only 26 of the 96 starters finished the race.
- Born:
  - Bianka Panova, Bulgarian gymnast and gold medalist in three women's world championships; in Sofia
  - Joseph Fiennes, English film and television actor; in Salisbury, Wiltshire
- Died: King Prempeh II, 77, the Asantehene, since 1931, of the three million Ashanti people of Ghana. Prempeh was succeeded by his nephew, Opoku Ware II, a Ghanaian government official.

== May 28, 1970 (Thursday) ==
- The National University of Malaysia (Universiti Kebangsaan Malaysia or UKM) held its first classes, with 192 undergraduate students at a temporary campus in Kuala Lumpur. By 2016, it would be ranked as one of the highest-ranked research universities in the world by Times Higher Education and have almost 27,000 students (approximately 13,000 undergraduates and 14,000 graduate students) at its main campus at Bandar Baru Bangi.

The POW☆MIA flag

- The National League of POW/MIA Families was incorporated by a group of wives of American servicemen who were listed as prisoners of war or missing in action in the Vietnam War. The emblem of the organization, the POW/MIA flag, adopted in January 1972, continues to be flown at public locations. After the war, more than 1,600 servicemen were still listed as missing in action by the United States Department of Defense.
- Born: Glenn Quinn, Irish-born television actor known for Roseanne and for Angel; in Dublin (died of heroin overdose, 2002)
- Died: Bishop Iuliu Hossu, 85, Romanian Catholic cleric and Bishop of Cluj-Gherla since 1917; detained by Romania's Communist government since 1948, Hossu had been released from prison in 1955 and kept under house arrest.

== May 29, 1970 (Friday) ==
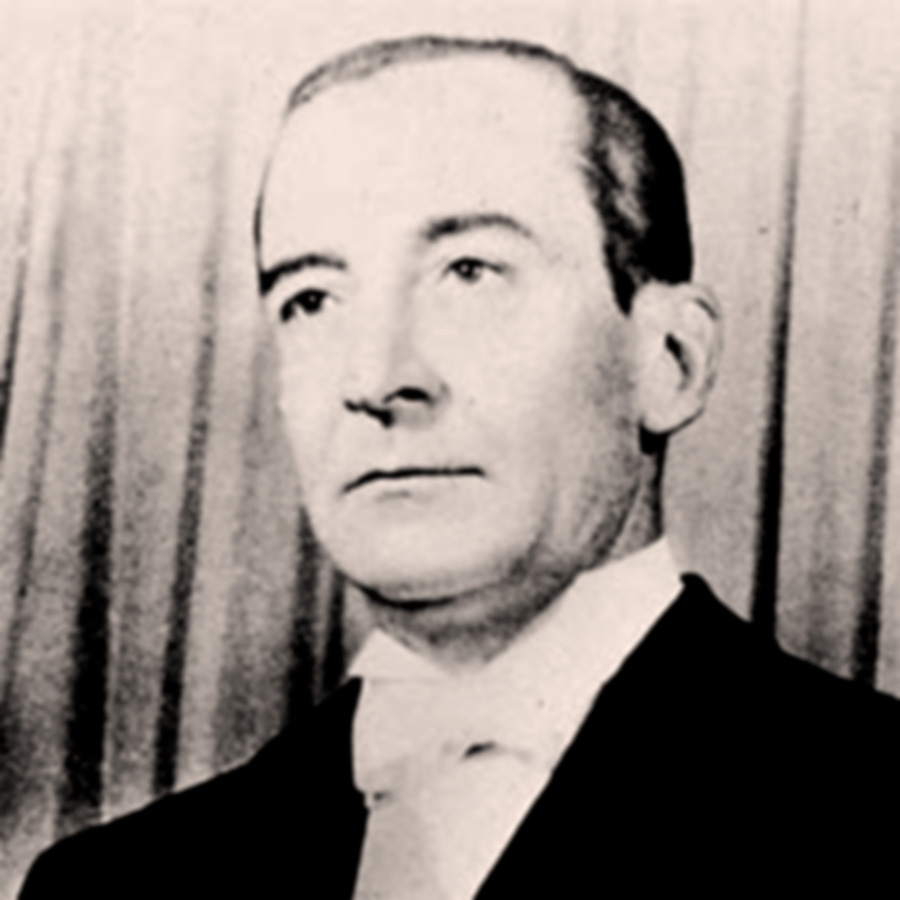
President Aramburu

- A former President of Argentina, Pedro Aramburu, was kidnapped from his Buenos Aires apartment by two men wearing military uniforms. Aramburu, who had been president from 1955 to 1958, was normally guarded by police, but voluntarily left with the men on the pretext that he was asked to travel with them to Argentina's army command headquarters "for security reasons". The kidnappers, who were members of the Montoneros anti-government group, murdered the former president three days later.
- With a crew of four, the La Balsa expedition departed from Guayaquil in Ecuador and began the longest voyage up to that time by a bamboo boat. The multinational adventurers were Vital Alsar of Spain, Marc Modena of France, Gabriel Salas of Chile and Normand Tetreaul of Canada. It would arrive in Australia, at Mooloolaba, Queensland, on November 5 after traveling 8,600 miles (13,800 km).
- Died: John Gunther, 68, American author known for the best-selling 1949 memoir, Death Be Not Proud

== May 30, 1970 (Saturday) ==
- Al Unser won the 1970 Indianapolis 500 in front of a crowd of 300,000 people, finishing 32 seconds ahead of Mark Donohue.
- Six people, all but one of them the occupants of a car that was "in the wrong place at the wrong time" were killed when a chartered Martin 4-0-4 airliner lost power shortly after takeoff from Atlanta's DeKalb–Peachtree Airport and crashed on to the east bound lanes of Interstate 285 east of the Moreland Avenue bridge. One passenger on the plane, which was transporting prospective home buyers from the Atlanta area to the Lehigh Acres Subdivision in Fort Myers, Florida, was killed. The dead in the car were a family of four two parents and two children, and another child who were on their way to a picnic. The accident was traced to the airport by a ground crew, who mistakenly filled the propeller plane's tanks with jet fuel.
- Around 9:30am on May 30, 1970, Edward Graves was killed when his liquid oxygen delivery truck exploded while he was making a delivery to Victory Memorial Hospital in Bay Ridge, New York. “It ripped the truck apart, shattered scores of windows in the 117‐bed hospital and surrounding buildings,” the Times reported, “and ignited propane in a shack on an adjacent construction site, killing a plumber in the construction shack, Steve Pascale. Thirty patients and 10 other people were injured by flying glass.
- Died:
  - Ian Clough, 32, British mountaineer, was killed by falling ice while descending the Annapurna Massif, three days after his British expedition team had conquered the South Face of Annapurna-1. Clough had descended to 17,800 feet (5,400 m) from the 26,504 foot peak as the expedition made its way back down.
  - Cheng Chin-ho (鄭金河), Chiang Ping-hsing (江炳興), Chen Liang (陳良), Chan Tien-tseng (詹天增) and Hsieh Tung-jung (謝東榮), five prisoners convicted of being the leader of the Taiyuan Prison Rebellion in February, were executed. In later years, they would be commemorated as the "Taiyuan Prison Martyrs" by advocates of the Taiwan independence movement against the government composed mainly of former government officials who had fled mainland China after the Communist revolution in 1949.

== May 31, 1970 (Sunday) ==
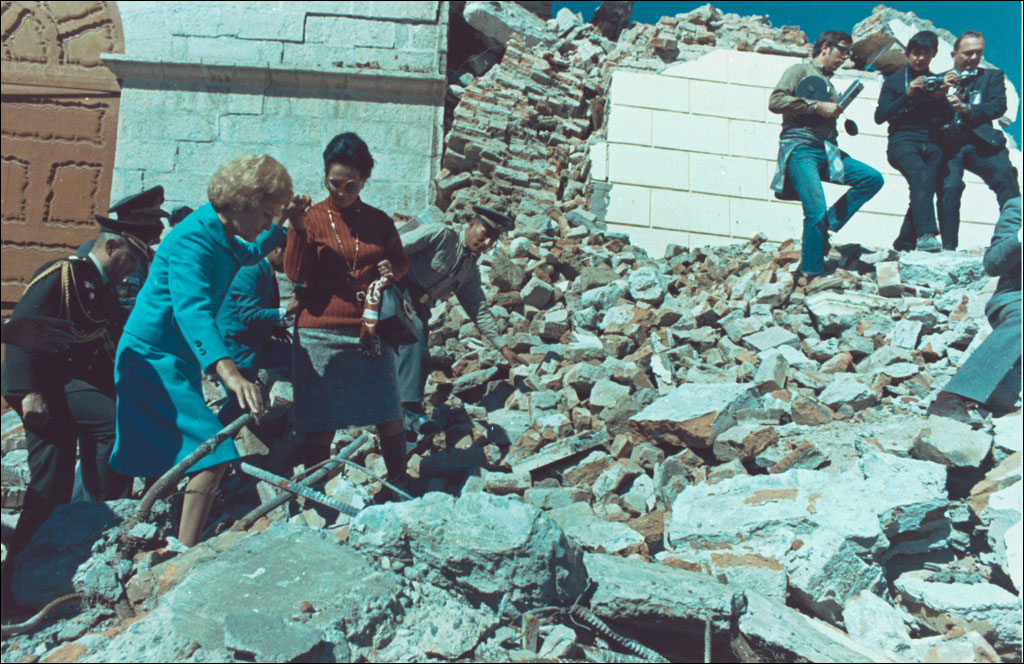
First Ladies Conseulo Vasco of Peru and Pat Nixon of U.S. at Yungay ruins

- A 7.9 magnitude earthquake struck Peru at 3:23 in the afternoon local time (20:23 UTC), triggering avalanches in the Andes Mountains that killed tens of thousands of people. The official death toll was 66,794. although later estimates were that 74,000 died and 25,600 were missing. Most of the casualties were residents of towns in northern Peru's Ancash departamento, particularly the Yungay Province. The villages of Yungay and Ranrahirca were completely buried, while the city of Huaraz saw 80% of its buildings destroyed. Only 50 of the 1,850 residents of Ranrahirca (which had rebuilt after being buried in a quake on January 10, 1962) survived, and only 3,000 of Yungay's 19,000 people lived, after both towns were buried beneath ice, rock and mud that rushed down Mount Huascarán. The nearby city of Huaraz suffered 10,000 deaths, and 2,000 died in the city of Chimbote More people would have died in Yungay had it not been for a circus that was taking place on higher ground outside of the town.
- Opening ceremonies were held to begin the 1970 FIFA World Cup in Mexico. The opener was a 0–0 tie between the host nation and its Group 1 rival, the team of the Soviet Union. Sixteen teams qualified and played over the next three weeks, with the final held on June 21.
- Died: Terry Sawchuk, 40, Canadian NHL goaltender since 1949 and Hockey Hall of Fame member, died from injuries sustained in an April 29 fight with his New York Rangers teammate, Ron Stewart. Before he had lost consciousness, Sawchuk told his physician that he blamed himself for starting the fight.
