= 1970 Preakness Stakes =

95th running of the Preakness Stakes

95th Preakness Stakes
- The Preakness Stakes
- Location: Pimlico Race Course, Baltimore, Maryland, United States
- Date: May 16, 1970
- Winning horse: Personality
- Jockey: Eddie Belmonte
- Conditions: Fast
- Surface: Dirt

The 1970 Preakness Stakes was the 95th running of the $205,000 Preakness Stakes thoroughbred horse race. The race took place on May 16, 1970, and was televised in the United States on the CBS television network. Personality, who was jockeyed by Eddie Belmonte, won the race by a scant neck over runner-up My Dad George. Approximate post time was 5:42 p.m. Eastern Time. The race was run on a fast track in a final time of 1:56-1/5. The Maryland Jockey Club reported total attendance of 42,474, this is recorded as third highest on the list of American thoroughbred racing top attended events for North America in 1970.

== Payout ==
The 95th Preakness Stakes Payout Schedule

Program Number	Horse Name	Win	Place	Show
1A	Personality	$11.00	$4.40	$3.20
6	My Dad George	-	$3.20	$2.60
2	Silent Screen	-	-	$4.20

== The full chart ==
Finish Position	Margin (lengths)	Post Position	Horse name	Jockey	Trainer	Owner	Post Time Odds	Purse Earnings
1st	0	1A	Personality	Ethel D. Jacobs	John W. Jacobs	Eddie Belmonte	3.40-1	$151,300
2nd	neck	6	My Dad George	Ray Broussard	Frank J. McManus	Raymond M. Curtis	2.60-1 favorite	$30,000
3rd	31/4	2	Silent Screen	John L. Rotz	J. Bowes Bond	Elberon Farms	4.20-1	$15,000
4th	51/4	1	High Echelon	Larry Adams	Hirsch Jacobs	Ethel D. Jacobs	4.50-1	$7,500
5th	61/4	3	Naskra	Ron Turcotte	Philip G. Johnson	Her-Jac Stables	6.70-1	
6th	63/4	5	Sir Wiggle	Howard Grant	Robert L. Wheeler	Nelson Bunker Hunt	116.40-1	
7th	83/4	13	Stop Time	Bill Hartack	Joseph W. Mergler	Briardale Farms	34.20-1	
8th	9	9	Admiral's Shield	Jimmy Nichols	Harvey L. Vanier	William C. Robinson Jr.	23.90-1	
9th	91/2	7	Dust Commander	Mike Manganello	Don Combs	Robert E. Lehmann	3.40-1 favorite	
10th	93/4	4	Buzkashi	Michael Hole	J. Woods Garth	James P. Mills	32.70-1	
11th	10	11	Robin's Bug	Leroy Moyers	Tracey Bougan	Walter J. Hickey	59.00-1	
12th	121/2	12	Hark The Lark	Ben Feliciano	Larry Boyce	Larry Boyce	34.20-1	
13th	191/2	10	Plenty Old	Henry E. Moreno	Mesh Tenney	Rex C. Ellsworth	52.10-1	
14th	231/2	8	Oh Fudge	Joe Culmone	Eldon Coffman	Harbor View Farm	94.50-1	

- Winning Breeder: Bieber-Jacobs Stables; (KY)
- Winning Time: 1:56 1/5
- Track Condition: Fast
- Total Attendance: 42,474
