= 1970 Kentucky Derby =

Horse race

96th Kentucky Derby
- Kentucky Derby
- Grade I stakes race
- Location: Churchill Downs
- Date: May 2, 1970
- Winning horse: Dust Commander
- Jockey: Mike Manganello
- Trainer: Don Combs
- Owner: Robert E. Lehmann
- Surface: Dirt

The 1970 Kentucky Derby was the 96th running of the Kentucky Derby. The race took place on May 2, 1970.

The race is most notable in American popular culture as the setting for "The Kentucky Derby Is Decadent and Depraved", an article written for Scanlan's Monthly by Hunter S. Thompson that would later be identified as the first instance of gonzo journalism.

== Full results ==
Finished	Post	Horse	Jockey	Trainer	Owner	Time / behind
1st	3	Dust Commander	Mike Manganello	Don Combs	Robert E. Lehmann	2:03.40
2nd	7	My Dad George	Ray Broussard	Frank J. McManus	Raymond M. Curtis	
3rd	1	High Echelon	Larry Adams	John W. Jacobs	Ethel D. Jacobs	
4th	9	Naskra	Braulio Baeza	Philip G. Johnson	Her-Jac Stable	
5th	5	Silent Screen	John L. Rotz	J. Bowes Bond	Elberon Farm	
6th	10	Admiral's Shield	Jimmy Nichols	Harvey L. Vanier	William C. Robinson Jr.	
7th	11	Corn off the Cob	Angel Cordero Jr.	Arnold N. Winick	Fence Post Farm	
8th	1A	Personality	Eddie Belmonte	John W. Jacobs	Ethel D. Jacobs	
9th	15	Native Royalty	Ismael Valenzuela	John T. Davis	Happy Valley Farm	
10th	14	Robin's Bug	Leroy Moyers	Tracey Bougon	W. J. Hickey-R. F. Kuhn	
11th	8	Terlago	Bill Shoemaker	Jerry M. Fanning	Samuel J. Agnew	
12th	12	Dr. Behrman	Chuck Baltazar	James P. Conway	Lin-Drake Farm	
13th	16	Action Getter	Mike Venezia	Bob G. Dunham	E. V. Benjamin-J. Jones Jr.	
14th	2	George Lewis	Bill Hartack	Buster Millerick	Mr. & Mrs. Allan Magerman	
15th	17	Fathom	Diane Crump	Don H. Divine	W. L. Lyons Brown	
16th	4	Holy Land	Hector Pilar	John Weiport	Steve Carson & Irving Apple	
17th	13	Rancho Lejos	H. Rudy Campas	Chay R. Knight	Mrs. J. S. Dean Jr.	

- Winning Breeder: Pullen Bros; (IL)
