= My Dad George =

American-bred Thoroughbred racehorse

- Sire: Dark Star
- Grandsire: Royal Gem
- Dam: Mabekky
- Damsire: Skytracer
- Sex: Stallion
- Foaled: 1967
- Country: United States
- Colour: Bay
- Breeder: George Cavanaugh & Associates
- Owner: Raymond M. Curtis
- Trainer: Frank J. McManus
- Record: 24: 8-5-3
- Earnings: $334,295

Major wins
- Flamingo Stakes (1970); Florida Derby (1970)
- Last updated on July 17, 2013

My Dad George was an American Thoroughbred racehorse who was foaled in Kentucky in 1967. Bred by George Cavanaugh & Associates, he was sired by Dark Star and was a grandson of Royal Gem. He was out of a Skytracer mare Mabekky. My Dad George is best remembered for winning the grade 1 Florida Derby and finishing second in the $200,000 grade 1 1970 Preakness Stakes to Personality.

== Background ==
Trained by Frank J. McManus, My Dad George was slow to develop and did not break his maiden until his third attempt. He then won or placed in his next eight races at the end of his two-year-old season and the beginning of his three-year-old season.

My Dad George is one of only two horses in history to be favored in all three American Triple Crown races while not winning any of the three. The other is Chief's Crown (in 1985).

== Three-year-old season ==
In the lead-up to the 1970 U.S. Triple Crown series, My Dad George was shipped to South Florida for the winter. In January 1970, he placed third to Naskra in the Everglades Stakes at Hialeah Park Race Track in Hialeah, Florida, at a mile and one eighth. In February, he won the historic Flamingo Stakes, also at Hialeah Park Race Track, at a mile and one eighth. On March 3, My Dad George won the grade 1 Florida Derby at a mile and one eighth at Gulfstream Park in Hallandale Beach, Florida . He went on to compete in and place second to Dust Commander in the mile and one quarter Kentucky Derby at the Churchill Downs in early May as the 5-2 favorite.

In the summer of his three-year-old season, My Dad George won the Stepping Stone Purse and followed that up with a third to Twice Worthy in the Haskell Invitational Stakes at a mile and one sixteenth at Monmouth Park Racetrack in Long Branch, New Jersey.

== 1970 Preakness Stakes ==
In May 1970, My Dad George's connections, owner Raymond M. Curtis and trainer Frank J. McManus, entered him in the second jewel of the Triple Crown, the $200,000 Preakness Stakes, run at a mile and three sixteenths on dirt at Pimlico Race Course in Baltimore, Maryland. My Dad George was listed on the morning line as the 5-2 favorite in a full field of fourteen colts. The Derby winner, Dust Commander, was the second favorite with the public at 7–2. My Dad George broke poorly to the outside, lacking speed early, and settled in tenth place under jockey Ray Broussard. He was moved into contention by Broussard after Pimlico's famous "Clubhouse Turn" and into the backstretch. My Dad George was fifth down the backstretch by a head while Silent Screen, Plenty Old and Oh Fudge led. On the front end, they set fast fractions, completing the first quarter in :232/5 and the half in :461/5. Dust Commander was seventh going down the backstretch.

Around the final turn, My Dad George responded along the rail and squeezed by most of the leaders and front runner Silent Screen. Meanwhile, around the outside, Personality circled the field, and both colts hit the top of the stretch together. In the last furlong, Personality brushed My Dad George slightly. Personality won by a neck over My Dad George. My Dad George finished over three lengths in front of Silent Screen and was another two in front of High Echelon in fourth. Dust Commander finished ten lengths back in ninth place. My Dad George took home 20% of the purse, which equaled $30,000.

My Dad George had success in his two-year-old year of racing with a stakes win. He also won the Stepping Stone Purse at Churchill Downs in Louisville, Kentucky, in 1970 before his run in the Derby.
