= High Echelon =

American-bred Thoroughbred racehorse

- Sire: Native Charger
- Grandsire: Native Dancer
- Dam: Luquillo
- Damsire: Princequillo
- Sex: Stallion
- Foaled: March 22, 1967
- Country: United States
- Colour: roan
- Breeder: Bieber-Jacobs Stable
- Owner: Ethel D. Jacobs
- Trainer: Hirsch Jacobs (1969); John W. Jacobs (1970)
- Record: 32: 4-5-4
- Earnings: US$383,895

Major wins
- Belmont Futurity Stakes (1969); Pimlico-Laurel Futurity (1969) Triple Crown race wins: Belmont Stakes (1970)

High Echelon (March 22, 1967 – May 14, 1991) was an American Thoroughbred racehorse best known for winning the 1970 Belmont Stakes.

== Background ==
High Echelon was bred by the partnership of Isidor Bieber and owner/trainer Hirsch Jacobs. His sire was the 1965 Florida Derby winner Native Charger, who was a son of Native Dancer.

High Echelon raced in the salmon pink-and-green silks of Hirsch Jacobs' wife, Ethel.

== Racing career ==
In 1969, the colt won the Belmont Futurity Stakes and the Pimlico-Laurel Futurity and was second in the voting to Silent Screen for American Champion Two-Year-Old Colt honors.

However, Jacobs, his Hall of Fame trainer, died on February 23, 1970, and did not see his three-year-old colt's success that year. Son John took over the race conditioning of High Echelon and three-year-old stablemate Personality. Going into the 1970 U.S. Triple Crown series, the entry of High Echelon and Personality was made the second choice by bettors for the Kentucky Derby. High Echelon ran third to winner Dust Commander, then finished fourth to winner Personality in the Preakness Stakes. Personality developed a fever, and his handlers did not run him in the Belmont Stakes. High Echelon did run, and under jockey John Rotz won that American Classic.

For the remainder of 1970, High Echelon did not win another graded stakes race.

== Stud record ==
After he was retired to stud, his offspring met with modest success in racing. He died on May 14, 1991, at Franks Farm in Ocala, Florida
