= 1970 visit by Richard Nixon to the Lincoln Memorial =

Spontaneous trip by US president to local monument

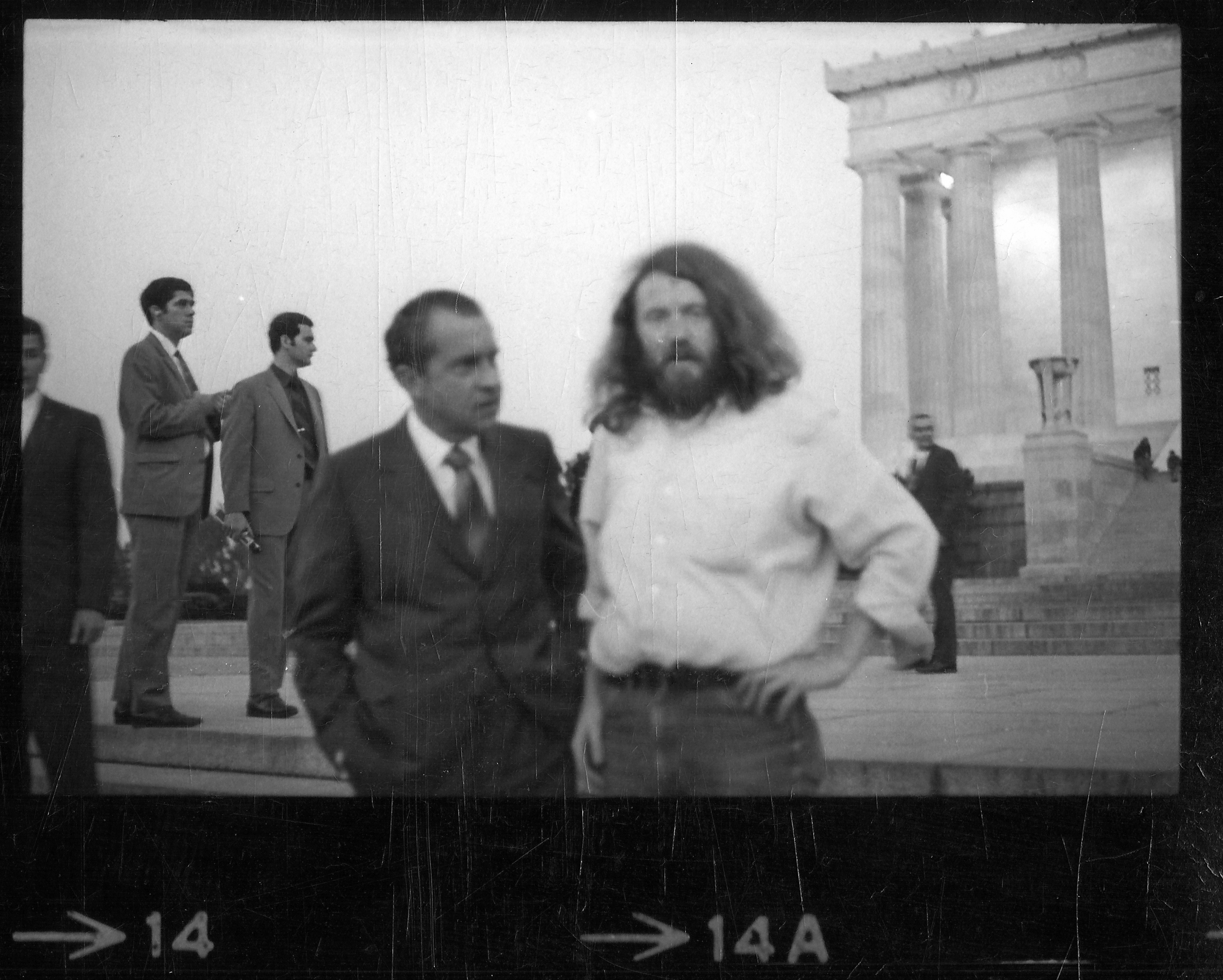
Nixon (left) at the Lincoln Memorial with student protester Bob Moustakas.

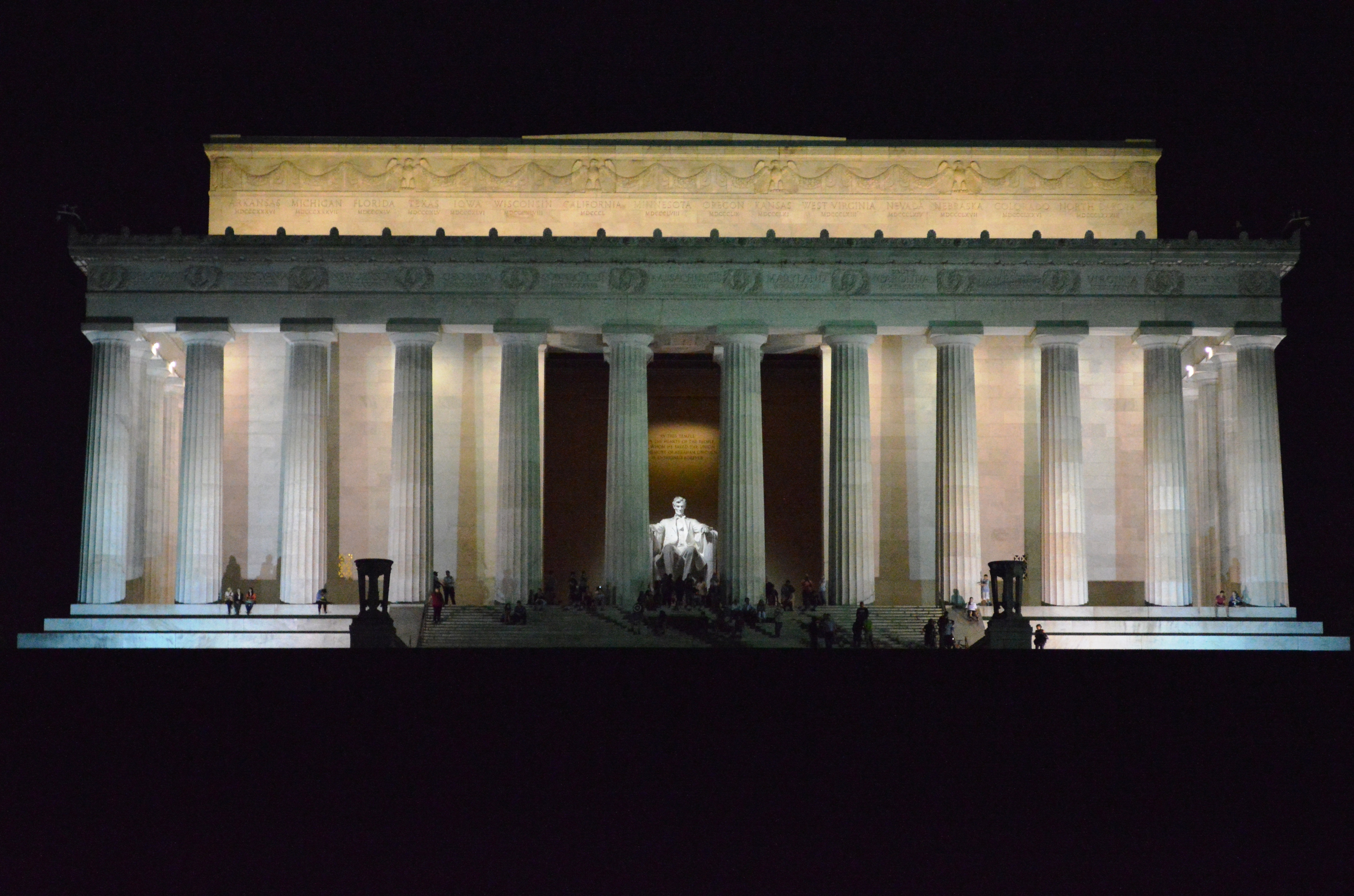
The Lincoln Memorial at night in 2014.

In the early hours of May 9, 1970, Richard Nixon, the 37th president of the United States, made an unplanned visit to the Lincoln Memorial where he spoke with anti-war protesters and students for almost two hours. The protesters were conducting a vigil in protest of Nixon's recent decision to expand the Vietnam War into Cambodia and the recent deaths of students in the Kent State shootings.

== Visit ==
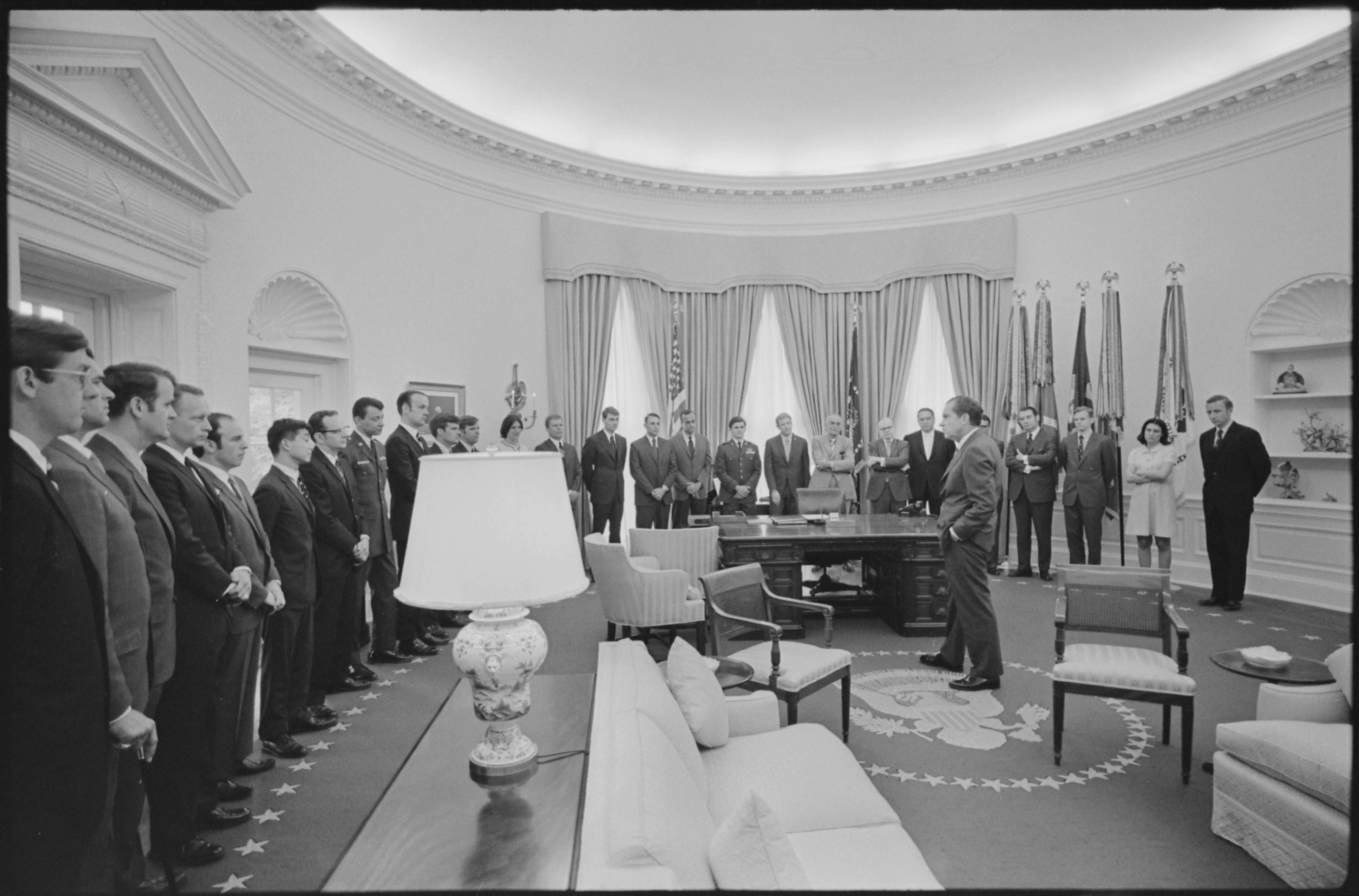
National Guardsmen with President Nixon in the Executive Office Building during protests in the student strike of 1970 the day before Nixon's visit to the Lincoln Memorial.

Nixon had finished a press conference at 10 p.m. on May 8, in which he had been questioned about his decision to expand American operations in Cambodia as part of the Vietnam War. Nixon then made 20 telephone calls to various people including Billy Graham, Thomas E. Dewey, and the NBC reporter Nancy Dickerson. He then slept from 2:15 a.m. until around 4 a.m.

Nixon awoke after 4 a.m. and put on a recording of Eugene Ormandy conducting Rachmaninoff at a loud volume in the Lincoln Sitting Room. This awoke his valet Manolo Sanchez. Looking at the gathering of people on the National Mall, Nixon asked Sanchez if he had ever visited the memorial at night and then told him to get dressed after Sanchez answered that he had not.

Nixon, Sanchez, senior White House doctor Walter R. Tkach and Secret Service agents then drove to the memorial in a presidential limousine, with Nixon later recalling that he had "never seen the Secret Service quite so petrified with apprehension". Upon arrival Nixon and Sanchez walked up the steps to the statue of the seated Lincoln with Nixon pointing out the carved inscriptions of Lincoln's Second Inaugural Address and his Gettysburg Address. White House Deputy for Domestic Affairs Egil Krogh was also present.

Some students had recognised Nixon by now and, although surprised by his advent, walked up to him and shook his hand. Nixon said that the students "were not unfriendly" to him, but "seemed somewhat overawed". Nixon learnt that several of them attended Syracuse University, and spoke of the university's football team. Commenting later to journalists, the Syracuse University students felt that "most of what he was saying was absurd ... Here we had come from a university that's completely uptight, on strike, and when we told him where we were from, he talked about the football team."

On the Vietnam War, Nixon told the students:

I hope that [your] hatred of the war, which I could well understand, would not turn into a bitter hatred of our whole system, our country and everything that it stood for. I said that I know probably most of you think I'm an SOB. But I want you to know that I understand just how you feel.

He encouraged them to travel while they were young and praised the architecture of Prague and Warsaw. But a student told Nixon "We're not interested in what Prague looks like ... We're interested in what kind of life we build in the United States."

Nixon then told the students that "the spiritual hunger which all of us have" which "has been the great mystery of life from the beginning of time" would not be solved by improving air quality and ending the war. A student later recalled that Nixon was barely audible and his sentences had no structure. Towards the end of the visit the crowd of students had grown to 30 and a student told Nixon, "I hope you realize that we're willing to die for what we believe in", to which he responded that "Many of us when we were your age were also willing to die for what we believe in and are willing to do so today. The point is, we are trying to build a world in which you will not have to die for what you believe in."

The Secret Service agents accompanying Nixon grew concerned for his safety with the increasing crowd and tone of the exchanges with the students and pretended that a call was waiting for him in his car hoping that he would leave, but Nixon kept telling them "Let it wait". With the advent of dawn, Nixon returned to the presidential limousine, but as he walked back, "a bearded fellow from Detroit" in Nixon's words, rushed towards him and requested a photograph with him, that was duly taken by the White House doctor. In a documentary, Bob Moustakas, the "bearded fellow from Detroit" claimed that, during the encounter, he was on LSD.

Nixon said that the man from Detroit had "the broadest smile that I saw on the entire visit". Nixon then left in the presidential limousine.

On the return trip to the White House, Nixon insisted on stopping at the United States Capitol, where he took his former seat in the chamber of the U.S. House of Representatives and instructed Sanchez to make a speech. Sanchez spoke of his pride in being a citizen of the United States and Nixon and some female cleaners who were present applauded. One of the women present, Carrie Moore, asked Nixon to sign her bible, which he did, and holding her hand told her that his mother "was a saint" and "you be a saint too". Nixon and his group, which now included White House Press Secretary Ron Ziegler and Nixon's Appointments Secretary Dwight Chapin, as well as Tkach, White House Chief of Staff H. R. Haldeman and Sanchez, then ate a breakfast of corned beef hash and eggs at the Rib Room of the Mayflower Hotel. Nixon was determined to walk back the last half mile to the White House from the hotel, and aides tried to forcibly grab his arm. Eventually Nixon got into the car.

== Aftermath ==
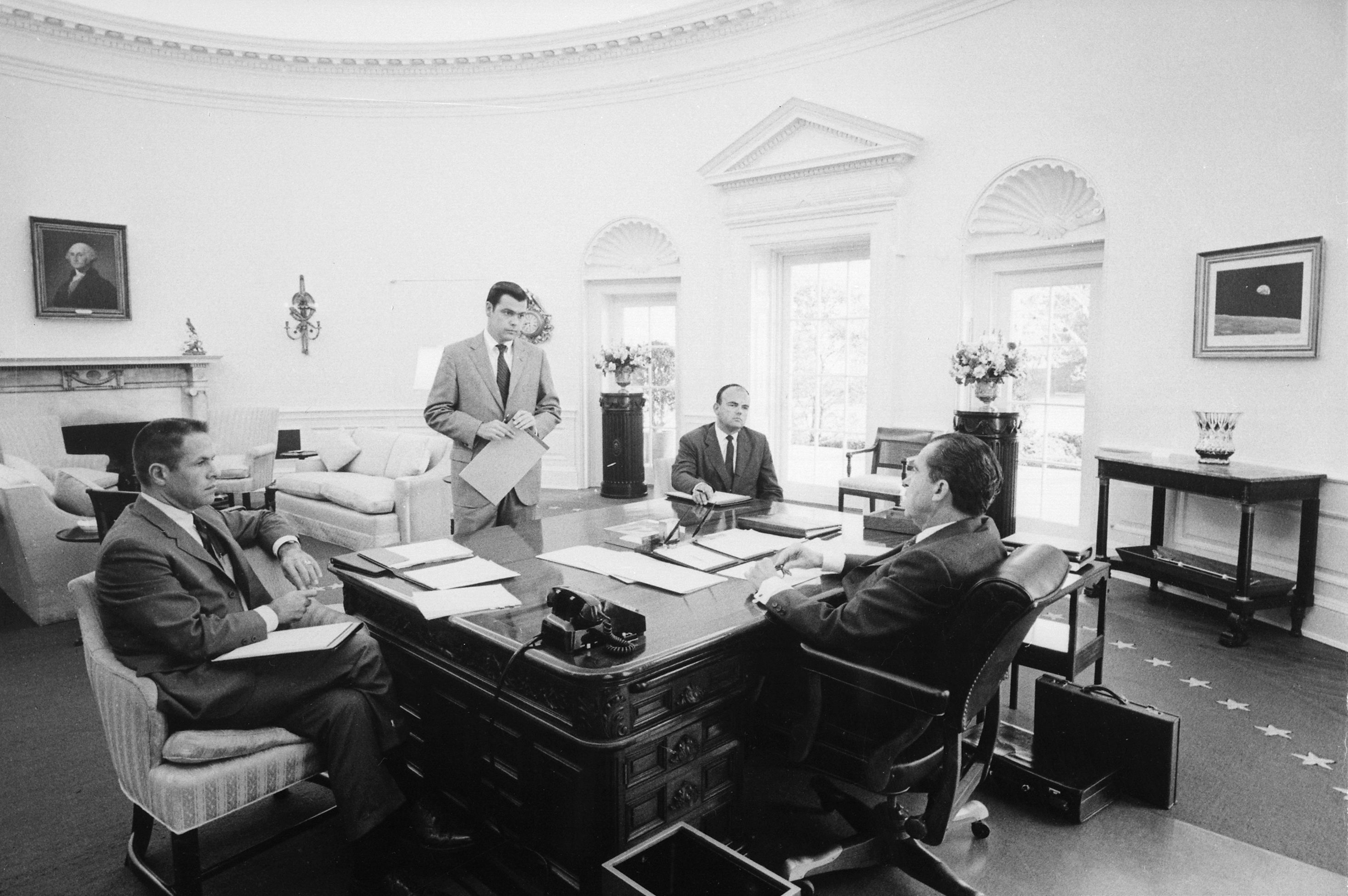
From left; H.R. Haldeman, Dwight Chapin, John D. Ehrlichman, and Nixon in the Oval Office in 1970. Haldeman and Chapin accompanied Nixon on his visit to the Lincoln Memorial.

In 2011 the Nixon Presidential Library and Museum released a series of presidential dictabelt recordings, of which five featured Nixon dictating his recollections of his visit to the Lincoln Memorial in a memo to Haldeman. In the memo Nixon instructs his recollections to be shared "on a very limited basis" to close aides. Writer Tom McNichol described the memo as an attempt at damage control as early press reports of the visit had described an "exhausted and overwrought president engaging students in nonsensical banter". Nixon said that "Even when I'm tired, I do not talk about nonsensical things" and defended the dialogue as his attempt "to lift them a bit out of the miserable intellectual wasteland in which they now wander".

Writing in The Atlantic in 2011, Tom McNichol wrote:

"None of the students at the Lincoln Memorial remember Nixon's behavior the way Nixon does. More tellingly, none of his loyal aides remember it Nixon's way either." [...] "Listening to Nixon describe his bizarre sojourn to the Lincoln Memorial is to hear a man who's already sold himself on an alternate version of reality. Having convinced himself of his version of the facts, all that remains is for him to win over the rest of the world."

Following the visit, Haldeman would write in his diary that he was "concerned about his condition" and concluded that the event had been "the weirdest day so far". Haldeman wrote that "he has had very little sleep for a long time and his judgment, temper, and mood suffer badly as a result....there's a long way to go, and he's in no condition to weather it."

Krogh felt that the impromptu visit was a "very significant and major effort to reach out". Nixon later expressed the view that those in the anti-war movement were the pawns of foreign communists. After the student protests, Nixon asked Haldeman to consider the Huston Plan, which would have used illegal procedures to gather information on the leaders of the anti-war movement. Only the resistance of J. Edgar Hoover stopped the plan.

== In popular culture ==
Nixon's meeting with protesters was depicted in Oliver Stone's 1995 biopic, Nixon, in which Nixon is portrayed by Anthony Hopkins.
