= Don Combs =

American Thoroughbred racehorse trainer (1938/1939–2025)

Personal information
- Born: 1938 or 1939 Lexington, Kentucky, U.S.
- Died: May 25, 2025 (aged 86) Lexington, Kentucky, U.S.
- Occupation: Trainer

Horse racing career
- Sport: Horse racing

Major racing wins
- Blue Grass Stakes (1970); Gallorette Handicap (1970); Knickerbocker Handicap (1970); Long Island Handicap (1970); Palm Beach Handicap (1971); Clark Handicap (1975); Essex Handicap (1975); Fayette Stakes (1975); Oaklawn Handicap (1975); Pocahontas Stakes (1975); Will Rogers Handicap (1978); American Handicap (1979); Arlington Handicap (1980); Louisiana Downs Handicap (1980) U.S. Triple Crown series: Kentucky Derby (1970)

Significant horses
- Dust Commander, Mongo's Pride, Warbucks

Don Combs (1938 or 1939 – May 25, 2025) was an American Thoroughbred racehorse trainer.

Combs was 31 years old when he trained Dust Commander to win the 1970 Kentucky Derby.

Combs died of a stroke on May 25, 2025, at the age of 86.
