= 1959 Monte Carlo Rally =

28th Rallye Automobile de Monte-Carlo

1959 Monte Carlo Rally: 28. Rallye Automobile de Monte-Carlo
← Previous event	Next event →
- Host country: Monaco
- Dates run: 19 – 25 January 1959

Statistics
- Crews: 345 at start, 186 at finish

Overall results
- Overall winner: (France) Paul Coltelloni; Citroën DS 19

The 1959 Monte Carlo Rally was the 28th Rallye Automobile de Monte-Carlo. It was won by Paul Coltelloni.

== Results ==
Pos.	No.	Driver	Car	Time
1	176	(France) Paul Coltelloni	Citroën DS 19	
2	211	(France) Andre' Thomas	Simca Aronde	
3	158	(France) Pierre Surles	Panhard HBR 5	
4	187	(France) Henri "Ido" Marang	Citroën DS 19	
5	232	(United Kingdom) Ronnie Adams	Sunbeam Rapier	
6	263	(Sweden) Gunnar Bengtsson	Volvo 122	
7	132	(West Germany) Siegfried Eikelmann	DKW 1000	
8	82	(United Kingdom) George Parkes	Jaguar Mark 2	
9	111	(United Kingdom) Philip Walton	Jaguar Mark 2	
10	208	(United Kingdom) Pat Moss-Carlsson	Austin A35	
11	347	(France) Michel Grosgogeat	DKW 1000	
12	162	(France) Fernand Schlichler	Renault Dauphine	
13	115	(United Kingdom) Jeffrey MacAndrew	Ford Zephyr	
14	175	(France) "Gino"	DKW 900	
14	201	(United Kingdom) John Sprinzel	Austin Healey Sprite	
16	293	(United Kingdom) Ivor Bueb	Sunbeam Rapier	
17	357	(France) René Trautmann	Citroën ID 19	
18	56	(France) Alexandre Gacon	Porsche 356	
19	28	(France) Jacques Blavet	AC Ace	
20	149	(West Germany) Hans Klinken	Volkswagen Coccinelle	
21	3	(West Germany) Günther Kolwes	Volvo PV 444	
22	236	(Sweden) Bengt Martenson	Volvo PV 544	
23	44	(Switzerland) Henri Ziegler	Sunbeam Rapier	
24	248	(Norway) Hans Ingier	Volvo 122	
25	67	(United Kingdom) Ian "Tiny" Lewis	Standard Super Ten	
26	221	(France) Jean-Louis Lemerle	Jaguar Mark 2	
27	138	(West Germany) Walter Schock	Standard Super Ten	
28	233	(Sweden) Gunnar Andersson	Volvo 122	
29	214	(France) Maurice Peyrot	Citroën ID 19	
30	230	(Finland) Carl Bremer	Saab 93	
31	297	(Norway) Leif Vold Johansen	DKW 1000	
32	287	(Netherlands) Rudolf Van Bennekum	Porsche 356 A	
33	286	(Norway) Arne Ingier	Volvo 122	
34	275	(United Kingdom) Cuth Harrison	Ford Zephyr	
35	69	(United Kingdom) Arthur Meredith-Owens	Riley 1.4L	
36	337	(West Germany) Wolfgang Levy	DKW 1000	
37	95	(United Kingdom) Eric Brinkman	Jaguar Mark 3	
38	165	(France) Jean-Claude Mothe	Renault Dauphine	
39	302	(Netherlands) Rob Dooijes	DKW 1000	
40	19	(France) Jacques Beylot	DKW 1000	
41	282	(United Kingdom) Edward Harrison	Ford Zephyr	
42	80	(United Kingdom) Brian Waddilove	Jaguar 3.4L	
43	260	(United Kingdom) Laurence Handley	Ford Zodiac	
44	55	(Spain) Garcia-Fernandez	Alfa Romeo Giulietta Berlina	
45	344	(Italy) Ovidio Capelli	Fiat 1200	
46	57	(France) Guy Jouanneaux	Citroën ID 19	
47	131	(Netherlands) Hans Tak	Mercedes 220 S	
48	343	(Switzerland) Marcel Pretre	Porsche 356 A 1600	
49	143	(Switzerland) Fausto Meyrat	DKW 1000	
49	281	(Sweden) Per Nystrom	Volvo 122	
51	74	(United Kingdom) John Banks	Vauxhall Velox	
52	102	(United Kingdom) George Faulkner	Ford Zodiac	
53	277	(Denmark) Rudolf Rottbol-Orum	NSU Prinz 1	
