= Manolo Sanchez (valet) =

Former long-time valet to Richard Nixon (1929–c.2000s)

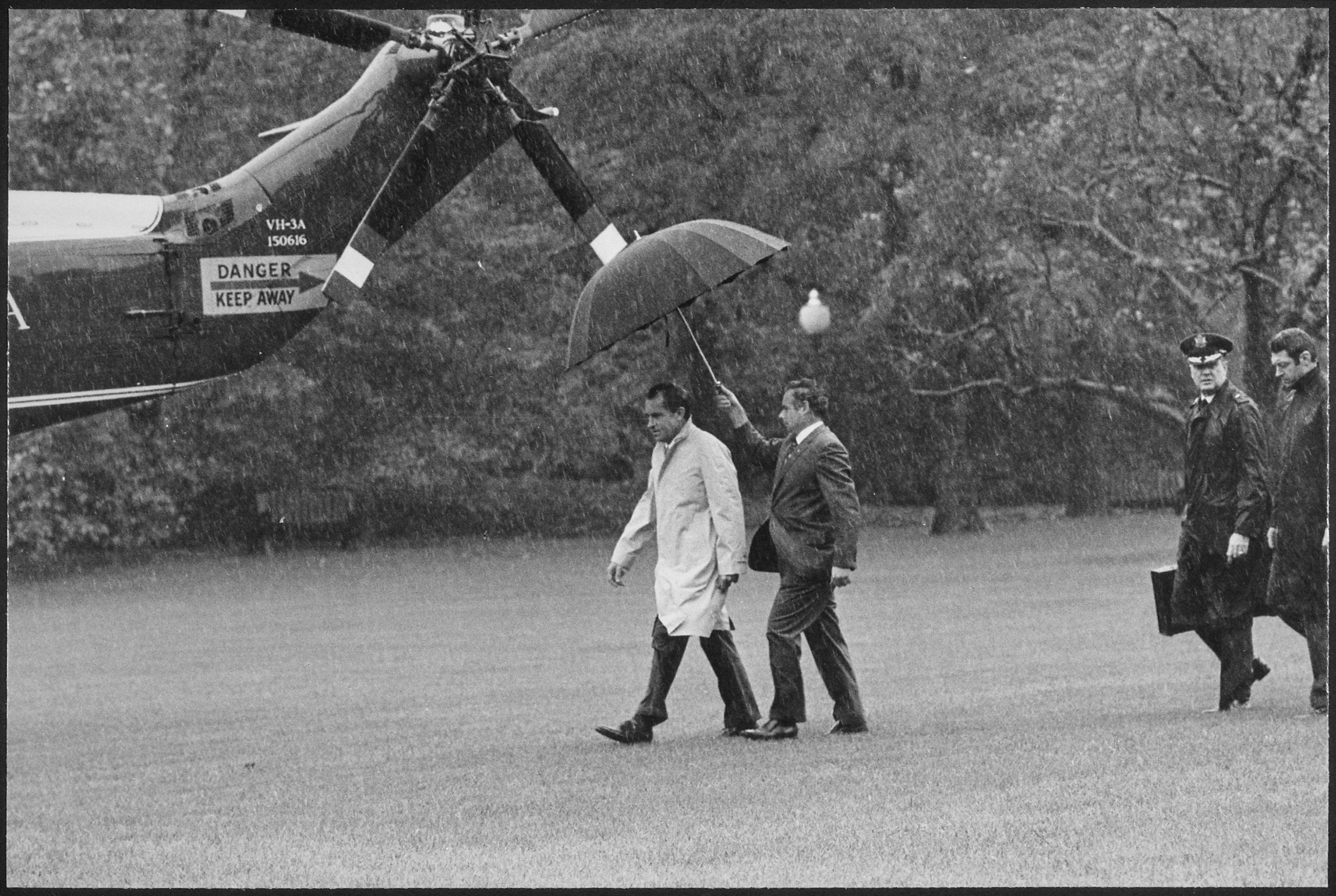
- Sanchez (holding the umbrella) in 1970
- Born: Manuel Sanchez; 1929; Havana, Cuba
- Died: c. 2000s Spain
- Citizenship: Spain; United States (naturalized)
- Occupation: Valet
- Known for: Working for Richard Nixon from 1962 to 1980
- Political party: Republican
- Spouse: Josefina Fernández (died 1990s)

Manuel "Manolo" Sanchez (1929 – c. 2000s) was a Spanish-American valet who served as the longtime personal attendant to Richard Nixon from 1962 to 1980. Known for his loyalty and devotion to Nixon, Sanchez became a close confidant and was considered by Nixon to be a member of his family.

== Early life ==
Sanchez was born in 1929 in Marianao, Havana, Cuba, to Spanish parents from A Coruña. His family returned to Spain shortly after his birth, where he was raised.

In 1946, Sanchez returned to Cuba, where he worked as a dishwasher and laborer. He immigrated to the United States in 1950, initially settling in Florida.

== Career ==
=== Early years with the Nixons ===
Sanchez began working for Richard and Pat Nixon in 1962 after being referred to the couple by Nixon family friend Bebe Rebozo. Sanchez and his wife Josefina moved into the Nixons' 12-room apartment at 810 Fifth Avenue in New York City. Nixon would later describe the Sanchezes as "members of our family in a very special way". Twelve years later, when asked by a reporter if he would continue working for Nixon after he left office, Sanchez responded "the boss will not need to ask me. Wherever he goes in three years from now, he knows I will go with him".

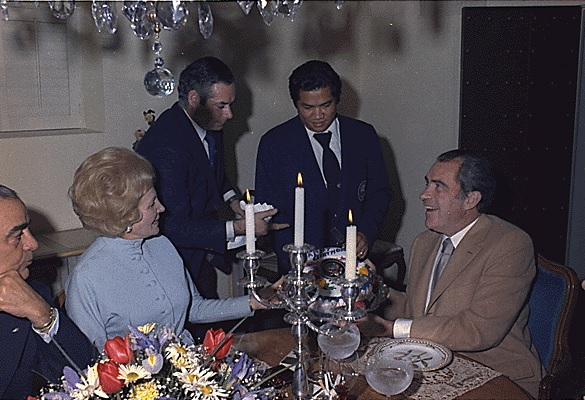
Manolo Sanchez, third from left, presents Richard Nixon with a cake at his 61st birthday party in 1974 at the San Diego home of Walter Annenberg.

On January 15, 1967, Nixon held a dinner at his home during which he decided to run for president of the United States in 1968. In attendance were Pat Nixon, the Nixon's children, Nixon's longtime secretary Rose Mary Woods, and Manolo and Josefina Sanchez. All attendees, except Pat Nixon, encouraged him to seek the Republican nomination.

Sanchez was naturalized a U.S. citizen in 1968; Nixon sponsored his application, attended the ceremony, and took the oath of allegiance with him.

=== White House years ===
Sanchez moved to Washington with the Nixons during the presidency of Richard Nixon, and lived with Josefina in a suite on the third floor of the Executive Residence of the White House.

Sanchez and Nixon
During a conversation with Manolo Sanchez at the EEOB in 1973, Richard Nixon inquires about acquiring Cuban cigars.

Sanchez, along with the president's physician Major-General Walter Tkach and four United States Secret Service agents, accompanied Nixon during his unannounced 4:40 a.m. visit to the Lincoln Memorial on May 8, 1970, during which he met students protesting the Vietnam War. Nixon reportedly woke Sanchez at 4:22 in the morning and inquired if he'd "ever seen the Lincoln Memorial at night? Get your clothes on, we'll go!" At the memorial, Nixon showed Sanchez inside the sanctum and described the inscriptions; the pair were eventually approached by a group of about 30 protesters and spent the next two hours speaking with them. After White House personnel became aware Nixon had left the building unannounced, Ron Ziegler mounted a mission to retrieve him. After recovering the president, and during the return trip to the White House, Nixon insisted on stopping at the United States Capitol, where he took his former seat in the chamber of the U.S. House of Representatives and instructed Sanchez to make a speech. Sanchez spoke of his pride in being a citizen of the United States and Nixon and some female cleaners who were present applauded. One of the women present, Carrie Moore, asked Nixon to sign her Bible, which he did, and holding her hand told her that his mother "was a saint" and "you be a saint too". White House Chief of Staff H. R. Haldeman would later describe the incident in his diary as "the weirdest day yet".

During his last years in the White House, Nixon became increasingly dependent on Sanchez, and the two developed a constructed language "sometimes using words that only the two of them understood". When Sanchez was summoned for jury duty in 1972, White House Chief of Staff John Ehrlichman asked the court to excuse Sanchez from service "in order that he can be available to the president". Despite his loyalty to Nixon, Sanchez was known to have disagreed with the president on several occasions. During one incident, in 1973, Nixon expressed frustration to Environmental Protection Agency Administrator Russell E. Train about overly cumbersome environmental regulations, citing the instance of mangrove trees at his property in Key Biscayne, Florida, which he couldn't cut down, before turning to Sanchez and asking "isn't that right"? Sanchez reportedly replied:

No, Mr. President. You know when I have my day off down there I go fishing. I know that the fish I catch need those mangroves to grow up in. If you cut them down there won't be any more fish.

=== Post-presidency ===
Sanchez continued working for Richard and Pat Nixon at their post-presidency home in San Clemente, California. Sanchez was alone with Nixon when the latter suffered a near-fatal relapse after emerging from surgery for phlebitis in 1974. Before slipping into unconsciousness, Nixon told Sanchez "Manolo, I don't think I'm going to get out of here alive". After Nixon received a pardon from Gerald Ford, the Associated Press intercepted Sanchez while he was grocery shopping for Nixon in Palm Springs to get Nixon's reaction. Sanchez replied that,

Someday I'm going to tell you everything, the way they framed him. I think it was maybe even harder on me than on him. The pardon was a big relief to us all. He is in good spirits, thank you, God.

By 1980, after nearly two decades serving the Nixons, Manolo Sanchez retired with his wife and returned to Spain.

== Personal life ==
Sanchez married his wife, Josefina, in Spain.

Little is known about Sanchez after his return to Spain. A 2019 article from the newspaper Faro de Vigo reports that his wife, Josefina, died in the 1990s, and he died several years later, after the turn of the 21st century.

== Portrayals ==
Sanchez was played by Tony Plana in Oliver Stone's Nixon, and Eloy Casados in Ron Howard’s Frost/Nixon.

== See also ==
- Colonel Jack Brennan
