= Mike Manganello =

American jockey

Personal information
- Born: 1941 (age 84–85) Hartford, Connecticut, United States
- Occupation: Jockey

Horse racing career
- Sport: Horse racing
- Career wins: 2,500+

Major racing wins
- Turfway Park Fall Championship Stakes (1966, 1967, 1968, 1969, 1971); Bewitch Stakes (1968); Blue Grass Stakes (1970); Churchill Downs Handicap (1970); Lafayette Stakes (1970); Bahamas Stakes (1972); Breeders' Futurity Stakes (1973); Clark Handicap (1973); Hawthorne Derby (1973); Derby Trial Stakes (1974); Pucker Up Stakes (1976); Tejano Run Stakes (1977); Ohio Derby (1967); Bashford Manor Stakes (1967, 1968, 1973); Cradle Stakes (1987) American Classic Race wins: Kentucky Derby (1970)

Honors
- Italian American Sports Hall of Fame (2017); Cleveland Sports Hall of Fame (2018)

Significant horses
- Dust Commander, Te Vega, Knight Counter, Marshua's Dancer, T.V Vixen, Golden Don, Will Step, New Prospect, Likely Swaps, Ga Hai, Majestic Needles

Michael Manganello (born 1941 in Hartford, Connecticut) is a retired American Thoroughbred horse racing jockey.

== Riding career ==
He got his start working for trainer Odie Clelland as a stable hand then began riding professionally in 1959 and earned his first win on March 3, 1960, at Fair Grounds Race Course in New Orleans. On June 25, 1964, he rode five straight winners at Ohio's Thistledown Racecourse. He was a long-time fan favorite at Florida Downs in Oldsmar, Florida where he won four races on a single day on February 15, 1968, set a season record with 75 wins in 1969, and by 1975 had won six riding titles.A record that has not been surpassed as of 2023. His five wins in the Turfway Park Fall Championship Stakes is the most by any jockey as of 2023 .

In 1970, Mike Manganello won the Blue Grass Stakes at Keeneland Race Course in Lexington, Kentucky aboard Dust Commander then rode the colt to a commanding five-length victory in the most prestigious race in American horse racing, the Kentucky Derby. In addition to winning the 1970 Kentucky Derby, Manganello also had mounts in 1969, 1971, 1972 and in 1974. He was the leading stakes rider in 1968.

== Retirement ==
Mike Manganello retired from riding in 1979 and went to work as a horse trainer with his own public stable but returned to riding in 1984. In 1987, he won race number 2,500 of his career at Tampa Bay Downs. He went on to a new career in racing as a race steward for another twenty-five years at various tracks .

== Honors ==
In April 2005, Mike Manganello was honored for his Kentucky Derby win with his handprints set in concrete on the "Gallop to Glory" walk at the main entrance to the historic Galt House Hotel in Louisville, Kentucky. He is also honored in the Kentucky Derby Museum in Louisville, Kentucky and was inducted as a Louisville Sports Commission Legend in 2015, Italian American Sports Hall of Fame in November 2017 and the Greater Cleveland Sports Hall of Fame, September 2018. Mike Manganello is a lifetime member of the Jockey's Guild.

== Personal life ==
Mike Manganello is a supporter of the Permanently Disabled Jockeys Fund and enjoys riding his Harley-Davidson and gardening in his spare time. He is currently living in Lexington, Kentucky with his wife Kitty. Mike and Kitty recently published his biography titled, The Hartford Hurricane, My Life as a Thoroughbred Jockey which details his road to the Kentucky Derby and full career as a jockey.
