= Personality (horse) =

American-bred Thoroughbred racehorse

- Sire: Hail To Reason
- Grandsire: Turn-To
- Dam: Affectionately
- Damsire: Swaps
- Sex: Stallion
- Foaled: 1967
- Country: United States
- Colour: Bay
- Breeder: Bieber-Jacobs Stable
- Owner: Ethel D. Jacobs
- Trainer: John W. Jacobs
- Record: 25: 8-4-2
- Earnings: US$462,603

Major wins
- Wood Memorial Stakes (1970); Jersey Derby (1970); Jim Dandy Stakes (1970); Woodward Stakes (1970); American Triple Crown wins: Preakness Stakes (1970)

Awards
- American Champion 3-Year-Old Male Horse (1970); TRA American Horse of the Year (1970)

Personality (1967–1990) was an American Thoroughbred racehorse who was voted 1970 Horse of the Year honors.

== Background ==
Personality was bred by the partnership of Isidor Bieber and owner/trainer Hirsch Jacobs. Sired by Hail To Reason, the 1960 American Champion Two-Year-Old Colt, Personality was out of U.S. Racing Hall of Fame inductee Affectionately, a daughter of another Hall of Fame inductee, Swaps.

Personality was raced in the salmon pink-and-green silks of Hirsch Jacobs' wife, Ethel. However, the Hall of Fame trainer died on February 23, 1970, and did not see his three-year-old colt's success that year. Son John W. Jacobs took over the race conditioning of Personality and three-year-old stablemate High Echelon.

== Racing career ==
Going into the 1970 U.S. Triple Crown series, Personality was made the second choice by bettors for the Kentucky Derby after winning an allowance race and then the important Wood Memorial Stakes at Aqueduct Racetrack. Ridden by Eddie Belmonte, Personality finished eighth to Dust Commander in the Derby but came back to win the Preakness Stakes from Corn Off The Cob and High Echelon. Two weeks later, he won the Jersey Derby, a race at Monmouth Park which at the time was used as a warm-up for the final leg of the Triple Crown. However, Personality developed a fever, and his handlers chose not to run him in the Belmont Stakes. Stablemate High Echelon did run and won.

Personality returned to racing on July 25, 1970, when he ran second in a field of older horses at Aqueduct Racetrack. On August 14, he won the Jim Dandy Stakes at Saratoga Race Course and finished second in the September 21 Stymie Handicap at Belmont Park. On October 4, 1970, Personality beat older horses in the Woodward Stakes to clinch Horse of the Year honors from the Thoroughbred Racing Association. In the rival Daily Racing Form poll, he finished runner-up to Fort Marcy

Personality's best results in top races at age four were a second in the Excelsior Handicap and a third in the Paumonok Handicap.

== Stud record ==
Retired to stud duty, Personality met with very limited success as a sire and in 1979 was sold to a breeding operation in Japan, where he died on November 20, 1990, at age twenty-three.

== Breeding ==
Pedigree of Personality
Sire Hail to Reason brown 1958	Turn-To bay 1951	Royal Charger	Nearco
Sire Hail to Reason brown 1958	Turn-To bay 1951	Royal Charger	Sun Princess
Sire Hail to Reason brown 1958	Turn-To bay 1951	Source Sucree	Admiral Drake
Sire Hail to Reason brown 1958	Turn-To bay 1951	Source Sucree	Lavendula
Sire Hail to Reason brown 1958	Nothirdchance bay 1948	Blue Swords	Blue Larkspur
Sire Hail to Reason brown 1958	Nothirdchance bay 1948	Blue Swords	Flaming Swords
Sire Hail to Reason brown 1958	Nothirdchance bay 1948	Galla Colors	Sir Gallahad
Sire Hail to Reason brown 1958	Nothirdchance bay 1948	Galla Colors	Rouge Et Noir
Dam Affectionately drk.brn. 1960	Swaps ch. 1952	Khaled	Hyperion
Dam Affectionately drk.brn. 1960	Swaps ch. 1952	Khaled	Eclair
Dam Affectionately drk.brn. 1960	Swaps ch. 1952	Iron Reward	Beau Pere
Dam Affectionately drk.brn. 1960	Swaps ch. 1952	Iron Reward	Iron Maiden
Dam Affectionately drk.brn. 1960	Searching bay 1952	War Admiral	Man o' War
Dam Affectionately drk.brn. 1960	Searching bay 1952	War Admiral	Brushup
Dam Affectionately drk.brn. 1960	Searching bay 1952	Big Hurry	Black Toney
Dam Affectionately drk.brn. 1960	Searching bay 1952	Big Hurry	La Troienne
