= Silent Screen =

American Thoroughbred racehorse

- Sire: Prince John
- Grandsire: Princequillo
- Dam: Prayer Bell
- Damsire: Better Self
- Sex: Stallion
- Foaled: 1967
- Country: United States
- Colour: Chestnut
- Breeder: D.R. Vespo & A. Noviello
- Owner: Elberon Farm
- Trainer: J. Bowes Bond
- Record: 18: 7-2-4
- Earnings: US$514,388

Major wins
- Arlington-Washington Futurity Stakes (1969); Champagne Stakes (1969); Cowdin Stakes (1969); Bahamas Stakes (1970); Saranac Handicap (1970)

Awards
- American Champion Two-Year-Old Colt (1969)

Silent Screen (1967–1993) was an American Champion Thoroughbred racehorse.

== Background ==
Silent Screen was trained by J. Bowes Bond for owners Sonny and Leah Ray Werbin who raced under the nom de course, Elberon Farm.

== Racing career ==
Silent Screen was the 1969 American Champion Two-Year-Old Colt. At age three in 1970, he won the Bahamas Stakes at Hialeah Park Race Track and the Saranac Handicap at Saratoga Race Course. He ran second to winner Personality in the Wood Memorial Stakes and third to him in the second leg of the U.S. Triple Crown series, the Preakness Stakes.

== Stud record ==
At stud, Silent Screen was the sire of a number of stakes winners. He died at Gainesway Farm, in Lexington, Kentucky on March 11, 1993, at age 26.
