= Dust Commander =

American-bred Thoroughbred racehorse

- Dust Commander after winning the 1970 Kentucky Derby
- Sire: Bold Commander
- Grandsire: Bold Ruler
- Dam: Dust Storm
- Damsire: Windy City
- Sex: Stallion
- Foaled: February 8, 1967
- Died: October 7, 1991 (aged 24)
- Country: United States
- Colour: Chestnut
- Breeder: Pullen Brothers
- Owner: Robert E. Lehmann. Silks: Gold, Red REL, Red Chevron on Sleeves, Gold Cap
- Trainer: Don Combs
- Jockey: Mike Manganello
- Record: 42: 8-5-4
- Earnings: $215,012

Major wins
- Blue Grass Stakes (1970) Triple Crown classic race wins: Kentucky Derby (1970)

Honours
- Dust Commander Stakes at Turfway Park

Dust Commander (February 8, 1967 – October 7, 1991) was an American Thoroughbred race horse.

== Background ==
The name "Dust Commander" is derived from his dam, Dust Storm, and his sire, Bold Commander. A descendant of Nearco, Dust Commander was bred by the Pullen brothers. He was owned by Robert E. Lehmann and trained by Don Combs. His dam Dust Storm was descended from the American broodmare Laughing Queen (foaled 1929) who was also the female-line ancestor of Tom Fool.

== Racing career ==
Dust Commander's Owners Trophy

In a 3-year racing career, Dust Commander had 8 wins, 5 places and 4 shows in 42 starts. He finished his career with $215,012 in winnings. Some of the highlights of his career include winning as a 2-year-old the City of Miami Beach Handicap and as a 3-year-old the Blue Grass Stakes, a Kentucky Derby prep race.

On May 2, 1970, with Mike Manganello aboard, Dust Commander won the 96th running of the Kentucky Derby in 2:03.4 ahead of My Dad George and High Echelon.

Hunter S. Thompson's seminal 1970 essay "The Kentucky Derby is Decadent and Depraved" detailed the running of the Derby won by Dust Commander.

== Stud record ==
Standing at stud, Dust Commander sired the 1975 Preakness Stakes winner, Master Derby.

In 2006, the family of the late Robert E. Lehmann donated Dust Commander's Kentucky Derby Trophy to the Kentucky Derby Museum.

== Pedigree ==
Pedigree of Dust Commander (USA), chestnut stallion, 1967
Sire Bold Commander (USA) 1964	Bold Ruler (USA); 1954	Nasrullah	Nearco
Sire Bold Commander (USA) 1964	Bold Ruler (USA); 1954	Nasrullah	Mumtaz Begum
Sire Bold Commander (USA) 1964	Bold Ruler (USA); 1954	Miss Disco	Discovery
Sire Bold Commander (USA) 1964	Bold Ruler (USA); 1954	Miss Disco	Outdone
Sire Bold Commander (USA) 1964	High Voltage (USA); 1952	Ambiorix	Tourbillon
Sire Bold Commander (USA) 1964	High Voltage (USA); 1952	Ambiorix	Lavendula
Sire Bold Commander (USA) 1964	High Voltage (USA); 1952	Dynamo	Menow
Sire Bold Commander (USA) 1964	High Voltage (USA); 1952	Dynamo	Bransome
Dam Dust Storm (USA) 1956	Windy City (GB); 1949	Wyndham	Blenheim
Dam Dust Storm (USA) 1956	Windy City (GB); 1949	Wyndham	Bossover
Dam Dust Storm (USA) 1956	Windy City (GB); 1949	Staunton	The Satrap
Dam Dust Storm (USA) 1956	Windy City (GB); 1949	Staunton	Crotanstown
Dam Dust Storm (USA) 1956	Challure (USA); 1948	Challedon	Challenger
Dam Dust Storm (USA) 1956	Challure (USA); 1948	Challedon	Laura Gal
Dam Dust Storm (USA) 1956	Challure (USA); 1948	Captivation	Stimulus
Dam Dust Storm (USA) 1956	Challure (USA); 1948	Captivation	Laughing Queen (Family: 3-j)
