= Union Avenue =

Union Avenue may refer to:

- Union Avenue Stakes
- Union Avenue, Montreal
- Union Avenue Historic District in Saratoga Springs, New York
- Union Avenue Historic Commercial District, Colorado
- Union Avenue Bridge (Passaic River)
- Union Avenue Line (Brooklyn)
- Union Avenue (Bakersfield)

== See also ==
- Union Turnpike (disambiguation)
