= Tom Wahl's =

Fast food chain in the Rochester, New York area

- Type: Subsidiary
- Industry: Restaurants
- Founded: March 19, 1955; 71 years ago
- Founder: Tom Wahl Sr.
- Headquarters: Webster, New York
- Number of locations: 7 (2024)
- Products: Hamburgers, sandwiches, hot dogs, french fries, root beer, frozen custard
- Parent: Bill Gray's, Inc.
- Website: www.tomwahls.com

Tom Wahl's is a chain of fast-food restaurants based in the Rochester, New York area with locations throughout the Finger Lakes region. Founded on March 19, 1955, by World War II veteran Tom Wahl Sr. as a roadside stand in Avon, New York, the restaurant is known for its "ground steak sandwiches," handcrafted root beer, and Abbott's Frozen Custard. USA Today named it one of "51 great burger joints across the USA" in 2010.

== History ==
=== Founding and early years ===
Tom Wahl Sr. opened the first Tom Wahl's on March 19, 1955, operating from a small stand along Routes 5 and 20 in Avon, Livingston County. The original menu was limited to homemade root beer and Twin Kiss ice cream cones; the menu later expanded to include hand-ground steak sandwiches and hot dogs. Wahl earned $7.80 on the first day of business, but by the 1970s the restaurant was serving 20,000 customers weekly. The first Tom Wahl's dining room opened in 1976 at the Avon location.

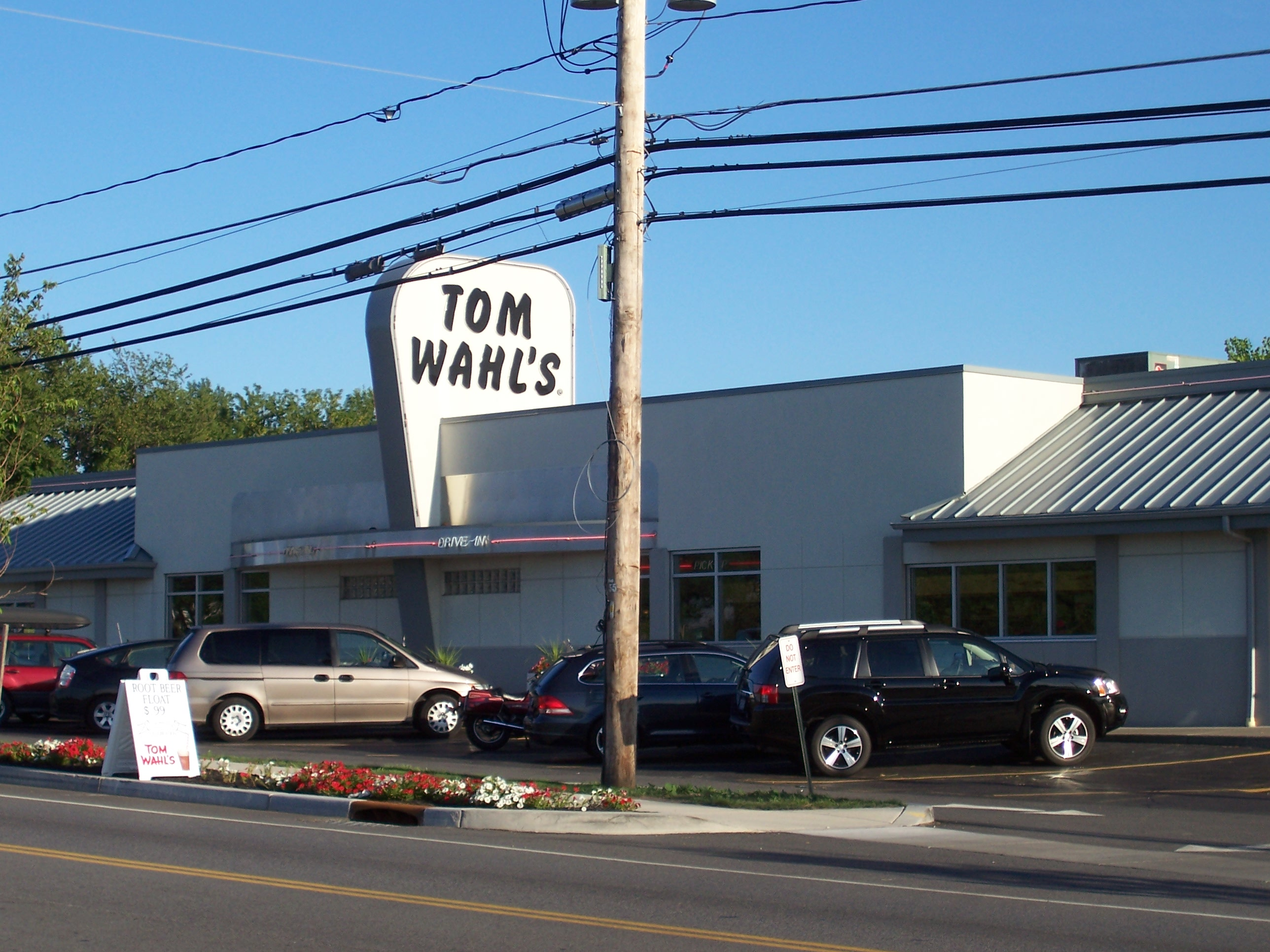
Original restaurant in Avon, New York

=== Sale to Bill Gray's ===
In 1986, Wahl sold the restaurant chain to Bill Gray's, Inc., a Rochester-area restaurant company. Under Bill Gray's ownership, the chain expanded throughout the Rochester metropolitan area and the Finger Lakes region. During this period, the company opened an upscale variant called Wahl Street in the village of Pittsford, which operated for several years before closing and returning the chain to its traditional diner-style format.

=== Wahlburger trademark ===
Tom Wahl's held a federal trademark on the name "Wahlburger," used for one of its signature menu items—a ground steak sandwich with Swiss cheese, grilled ham, lettuce, and special sauce. In 2011, actors Mark Wahlberg and Donnie Wahlberg, along with their brother chef Paul Wahlberg, approached Tom Wahl's about using the name for their planned restaurant chain. Tom Wahl's licensed the name to the Wahlberg brothers, allowing them to use it for Wahlburgers, which opened its first location in Hingham, Massachusetts later that year. The financial terms of the licensing agreement were not disclosed.

=== Recent history ===
By 2021, Tom Wahl's had closed its mall-based food court locations at the Mall at Greece Ridge, the Marketplace Mall, and Eastview Mall.

In December 2023, the original Avon location was added to the New York State Historic Business Preservation Registry, which recognizes businesses that have operated for at least 50 years and contributed to their community's history and identity. At the ceremony, the 92-year-old Wahl said, "Hundreds of young people worked their way through college at this restaurant, and I remain proud of the business I started so many years ago."

== Menu ==
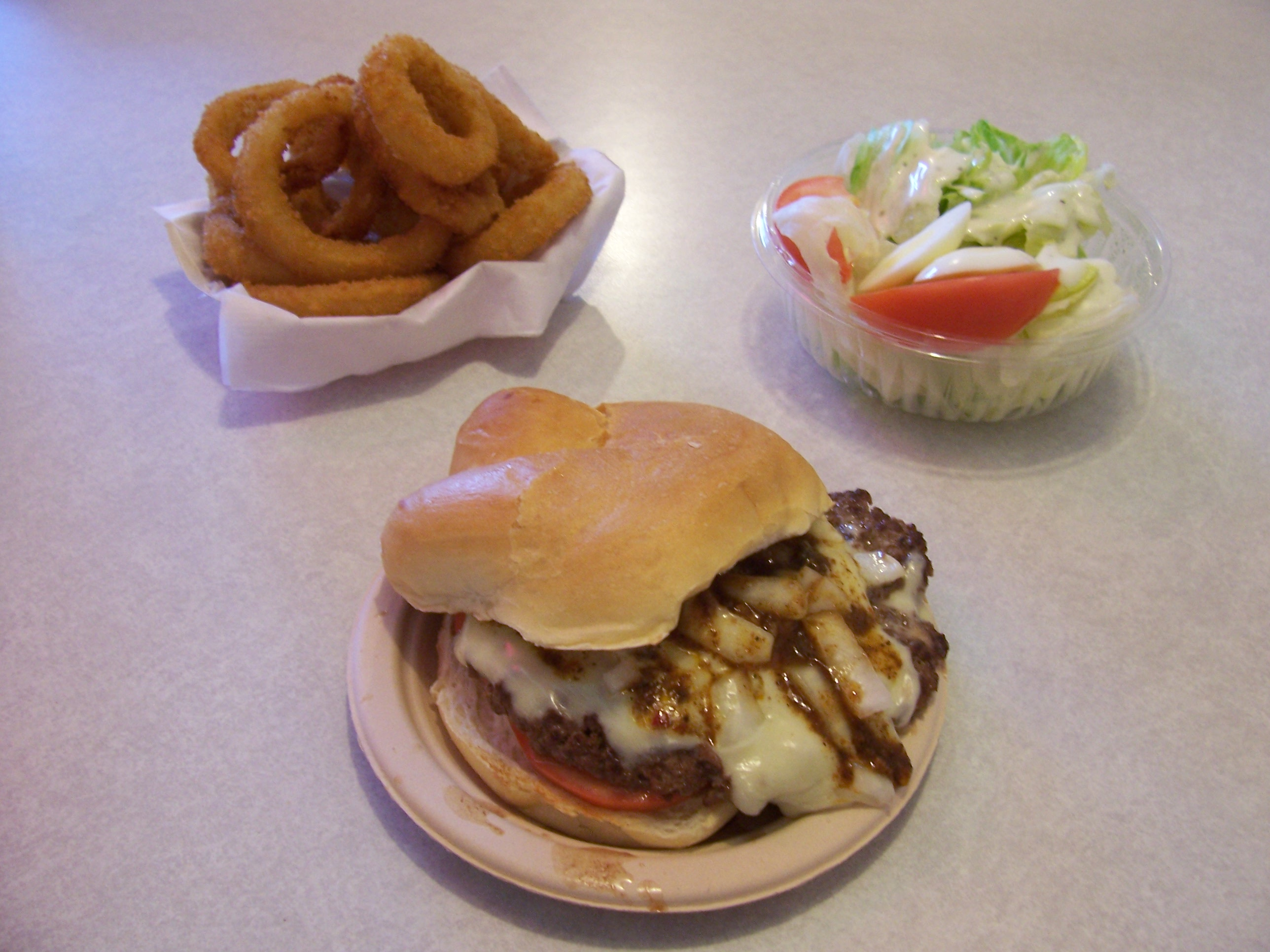
Tom Wahl's cheeseburger with hot sauce, onions, and tomatoes

Tom Wahl's is known for its "ground steak sandwiches," hamburgers made with ground steak patties that are pressed flat to increase surface area, resulting in faster cooking and crispy edges. The signature Wahlburger consists of a chargrilled ground steak patty topped with Swiss cheese, grilled ham, lettuce, and the restaurant's proprietary "Wahl sauce" on a seeded bun.

The menu also includes Texas Hot dogs made with Zweigle's sausages, a Rochester-based brand. Tom Wahl's serves handcrafted root beer in frosted mugs and offers Abbott's Frozen Custard for dessert.

Additionally, the menu includes fan-favorites like the 55 Junker Plate which features two sides and two burgers, the Haddock Fish Dinner with a fish and two sides, and the new Wahl Dough, which is fried pizza dough with powdered sugar.

== Locations ==
As of 2026, Tom Wahl's operates seven locations:

- Avon (original location)
- Brighton
- Bushnell's Basin
- Canandaigua
- Fairport
- Greece
- Newark

== See also ==
- Bill Gray's
- Wahlburgers
- List of frozen custard companies
- List of hamburger restaurants
