= White Skies =

American-bred Thoroughbred racehorse

- Sire: Sun Again
- Grandsire: Sun Teddy
- Dam: Milk Dipper
- Damsire: Milkman
- Sex: Stallion
- Foaled: 1949
- Country: United States
- Color: Chestnut
- Breeder: Charles Nuckols Jr.
- Owner: William M. Wickham
- Trainer: Thomas F. Root Sr.
- Record: 37: 20-8-4
- Earnings: US$246,025

Major wins
- Pageant Handicap (1952); Princeton Handicap (1952); Sport Page Handicap (1953); New Rochelle Handicap (1953); Interborough Handicap (1953); Carter Handicap (1954); Toboggan Handicap (1954); Paumonok Handicap (1954); Roseben Handicap (1954)

Awards
- American Champion Sprint Horse (1954)

Honors
- White Skies Handicap at Arlington Park

White Skies (1949–1955) was an American Champion Thoroughbred racehorse. An October 19, 1987 article in Sports Illustrated referred to White Skies as a "bullet" horse in the same vein as racing greats such as Tom Fool, Decathlon, Ta Wee, Dr. Fager, and Forego.

== Background ==
Bred by renowned Lexington, Kentucky horseman, Charles Nuckols Jr., he was out of the mare Milk Dipper and sired by Calumet Farm's Arlington Futurity winner, Sun Again.

Purchased and raced by Kentucky tobacco grower, William M. Wickham, he was trained by former jockey, Tommy Root.

== Racing career ==
White Skies earned wins in the 1952 Pageant and Princeton Handicaps. Best suited as a sprinter, he raced primarily at distances of six to seven furlongs. At age four in 1953, his wins included the Interborough and Sport Page Handicaps plus he set a new track record of 1:22 3/5 for seven furlongs in a win at the Atlantic City Race Course. At age five, White Skies had his best year and was voted the 1954 American Champion Sprint Horse. His wins included the Carter, Toboggan and Paumonok Handicaps plus the seven-furlong Rosben Handicap in a time of 1:22 2/5, only two-fifths of a second slower than the track record set forty-eight years earlier in 1906.

Regularly burdened with weights from 132 to 136 pounds, even when White Skies lost, the winner's time often had to be very fast as was the case when he finished second in track record time in the Oceanport Stakes to Robert L. Gerry's Master Ace at Monmouth Park. In the race, Master Ace carried 106 pounds to White Skies' 136.

White Skies raced again in 1955 at age six, and after going undefeated in seven career races at tracks in New York state, he incurred his first loss there in the 1955 Paumonok Handicap when he ran third to winner, Bobby Brocato.

== Death ==
On May 2, 1955, White Skies suffered a compound fracture of his right hind cannon bone during a training run at Jamaica Race Course in Queens, New York and had to be euthanized.

== Pedigree ==
Pedigree of White Skies
Sire Sun Again	Sun Teddy	Teddy	Ajax
Sire Sun Again	Sun Teddy	Teddy	Rondeau
Sire Sun Again	Sun Teddy	Sunmelia	Sun Briar
Sire Sun Again	Sun Teddy	Sunmelia	Bromelia
Sire Sun Again	Hug Again	Stimulus	Ultimus
Sire Sun Again	Hug Again	Stimulus	Hurakan
Sire Sun Again	Hug Again	Affection	Isidor
Sire Sun Again	Hug Again	Affection	One I Love
Dam Milk Dipper	Milkman	Cudgel	Broomstick
Dam Milk Dipper	Milkman	Cudgel	Eugenia Burch
Dam Milk Dipper	Milkman	Milkmaid	Peep O Day
Dam Milk Dipper	Milkman	Milkmaid	Nell Olin
Dam Milk Dipper	Afloat	Man o' War	Fair Play
Dam Milk Dipper	Afloat	Man o' War	Mahubah
Dam Milk Dipper	Afloat	Problem	Superman
Dam Milk Dipper	Afloat	Problem	Query
