= White sausage =

White sausage may refer to:

- Biała kiełbasa, a type of Polish sausage
- Boudin blanc, a type of French and Cajun sausage
- Weisswurst, a type of Bavarian sausage

== See also ==
- White hot, a type of hot dog
