= Linda L. Rice =

American horse racing trainer

Linda Rice
Personal information
- Born: March 7, 1964 (age 62) Racine, Wisconsin, U.S.
- Occupation: Trainer

Horse racing career
- Sport: Horse racing
- Career wins: 2,409 (as of December 31, 2023)

Major racing wins
- Miss Woodford Stakes (1988); Bernard Baruch Handicap (1991); Dixie Stakes (1991); Holy Bull Stakes (1991); Red Bank Stakes (1991); Robert F. Carey Memorial Handicap (1992, 2005); My Dear Stakes (1995); Tremont Stakes (1995, 2000); Remsen Stakes (1996); Athenia Stakes (1997); Victoria Stakes (1997); Adirondack Stakes (1998); Lake Placid Stakes (1998); Lamplighter Handicap (1998); Queen Elizabeth II Challenge Cup Stakes (1998 ) Spinaway Stakes (1998); Woodford Stakes (1998); Cowdin Stakes (1999); Federico Tesio Stakes (1999, 2014); Jimmy Durante Stakes (1999); Hopeful Stakes (2000); Sanford Stakes (2000); Saratoga Special Stakes (2000); Amsterdam Stakes (2001); Bison City Stakes (2001); Chick Lang Stakes (2001); Royal North Stakes (2002); Appalachian Stakes(2004); Belmont Oaks (2004 ) Bourbon Stakes (2005); Hudson Stakes (NYB) (2013, 2015); Alfred G. Vanderbilt Handicap (2014); Broadway Stakes (NYB) (2014, 2017, 2018, 2019); Distaff Handicap (2014, 2015); Dwyer Stakes (2014); Forego Handicap (2014); Iroquois Handicap (2014, 2015); Private Terms Stakes (2014); True North Handicap (2014); Union Avenue Stakes (2014, 2016); Gallant Bloom Stakes (2015); Safely Kept Stakes (2015); Vagrancy Handicap (2015); Vinery Madison Stakes (2015); Interborough Stakes (2016); John B. Campbell Handicap (2016); Barbara Fritchie Handicap (2017); Excelsior Stakes (2016); Harrison E. Johnson Memorial Handicap (2017); Jimmy Winkfield Stakes (2020); Withers Stakes (2020)

Racing awards
- New York Turf Writers Association Fourstardave Award for Outstanding Achievement (2000); NYTHA Trainer of the Year Award (2009, 2010, 2013)

Significant horses
- City Zip, Palace, La Verdad, Things Change

Linda L. Rice (born March 7, 1964) is an American Thoroughbred horse racing trainer and bloodstock agent. A trainer of graded stakes race winners and licensed since 1987, she has won multiple trainer titles at major race meets in the eastern United States.

== Background ==
Rice was born into a horseracing family in 1964. She was the daughter of trainer Clyde Rice. Her brothers Curt, Bryan and Wayne also became involved in Thoroughbred racing.

In 2000, Rice trained the colt City Zip, from the Adena Springs breeding farm of Frank Stronach, one of only four horses to win the Hopeful, Saratoga Special, and Sanford Stakes for two-year-olds.

In 2002, Rice became a board member of the New York Thoroughbred Horsemen's Association (NYTHA).

On August 18, 2008, at the Saratoga track, Rice's horses finished 1-2-3-4 in the Mechanicville Stakes.

=== Top trainer title ===
In 2009, Rice became the first woman in the modern era to win a trainer's title at a major U.S. racing circuit. She did so at Saratoga Race Course. She won the award with 75 starters, to the 135 starters of second-place finisher Todd Pletcher.

In addition to her win at Saratoga Racecourse in 2009, in 2011-2012 Rice won back-to-back training titles at Aqueduct Racetrack. In July 2011 she tied Todd Pletcher for top honors in the Spring/Summer meet at Belmont Park.

In 2015, La Verdad was voted the Eclipse Award for American Champion Female Sprint Horse, the first horse trained by Rice to be honored with a year-end championship.

In 2017, having taken a stable of runners to the Laurel Park Spring meet in Maryland for the first time, Rice tied for the training title in number of wins, doing so with a 53% winning percentage. She had 51 starters to the 128 of her co-win leader, Keiron Magee.

=== 2000 win era ===
On January 12, 2020, Linda Rice won the 2000th race of her career when Scilly Cay captured the Rego Park Stakes at Aqueduct Racetrack.

In 2023 Rice won or shared in all but one of the training titles across the NYRA tracks (Aqueduct, Belmont Park and Saratoga). She finished the year with 165 wins, establishing a new NYRA single-year record for trainers.

=== Sanctions ===
In 2015 and 2018, Rice was fined and sanctioned for scratching runners prior to races. In 2018, Rice came under suspicion for allegedly paying racing officials for information prior to races. After an investigation, in 2021, Rice was fined $50,000 and banned for three years from racing by the New York State Gaming Association after it was alleged she paid off race officials for information and conducted improperly. The ban was later overturned, but the fine was increased to $100,000 after she admitted improper activity and paying for insider information.

In 2024, Rice was sanctioned by the New York State Gaming Association after one of her winners tested positive for a banned substance. Rice was fined and suspended from racing for 14 days.
