= French's =

Brand of prepared mustard, condiments, fried onions, etc

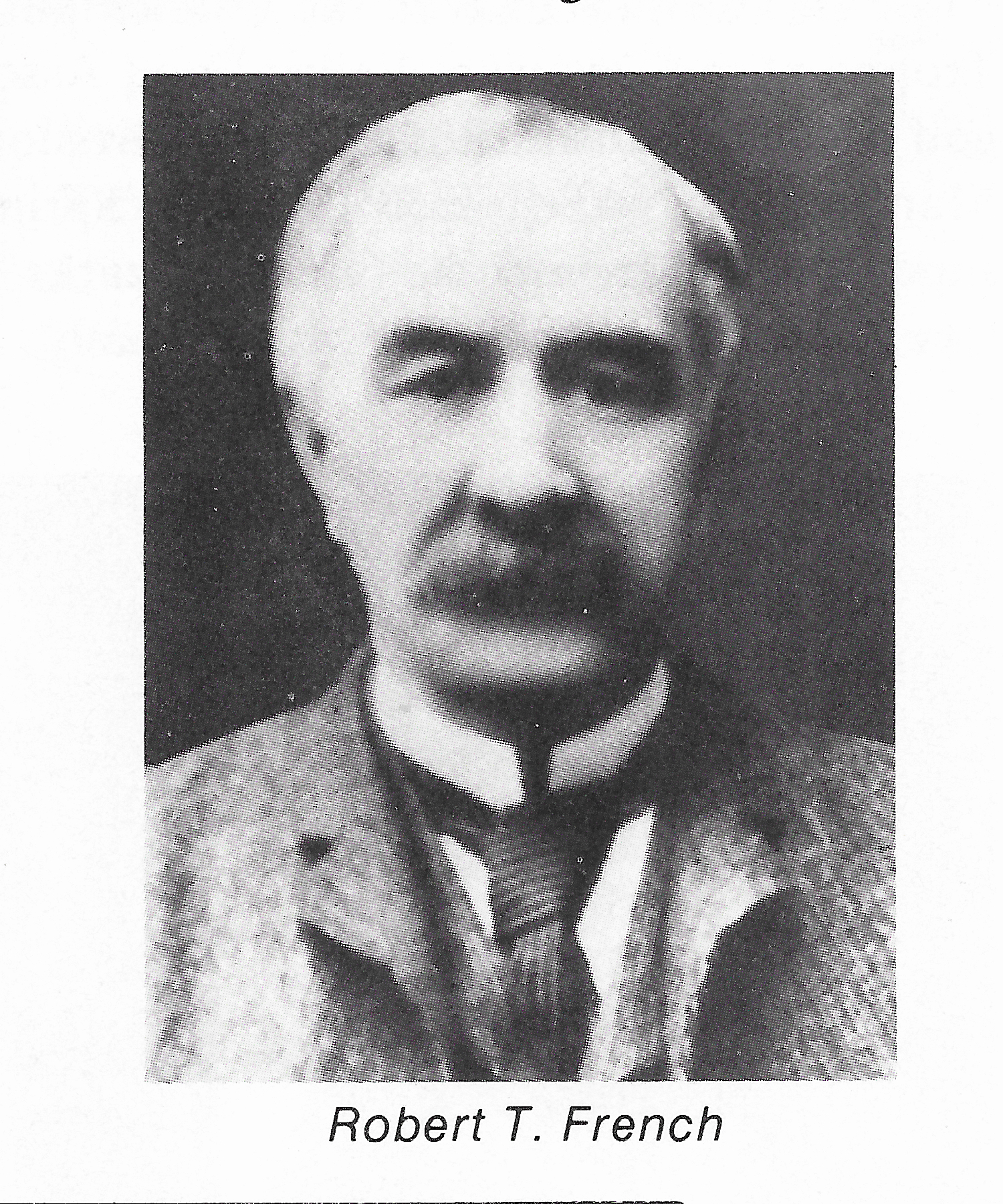
- Product type: Mustard, condiments, food items
- Current owner: McCormick & Company
- Country: Rochester, New York United States
- Introduced: 1904; 122 years ago
- Markets: Worldwide
- Previous owners: R.T. French Company; Reckitt Benckiser
- Website: www.frenchsmustard.com

French's is an American brand of prepared mustards, condiments, fried onions, and other food items, best known for its popular yellow mustard. Created by Robert Timothy French, French's "Cream Salad Brand" mustard debuted to the world at the 1904 St. Louis World's Fair. By 1921, French's Mustard had adopted its trademark pennant and begun advertising to the general public. French's is now owned by McCormick & Company.

== History ==
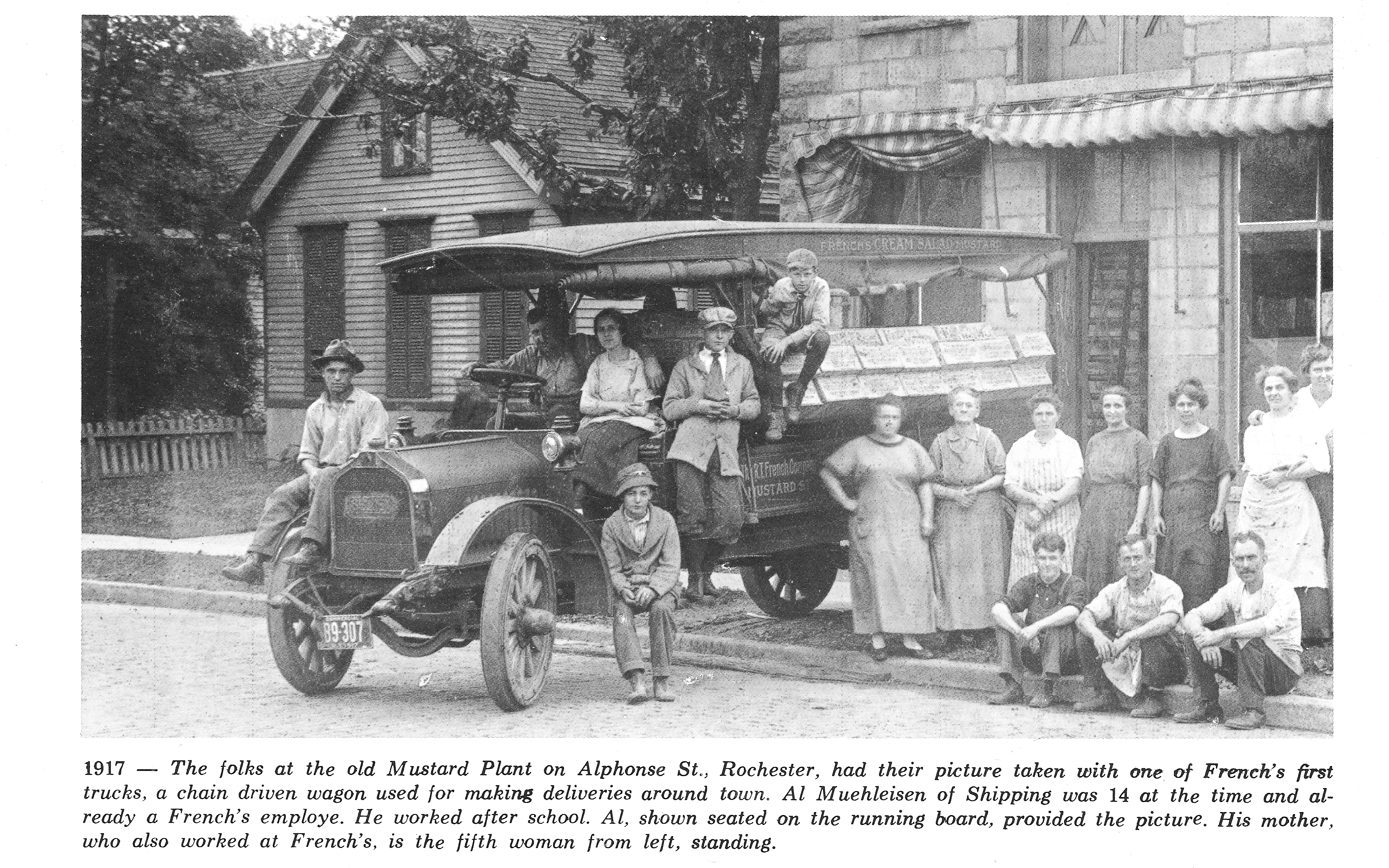
1917 photo of French's Staff on Alphonse Street in Rochester. Source The Pennant, March, 1964

Brothers Robert and George French bought a flour mill in 1883 in Fairport, New York. It burned down in 1884 and they relocated to Rochester, New York. They named their new mill the R.T. French Company. Robert French died in 1893 and George became company president. George (who developed the creamy yellow mustard) and another brother, Francis, introduced French's mustard in 1904.

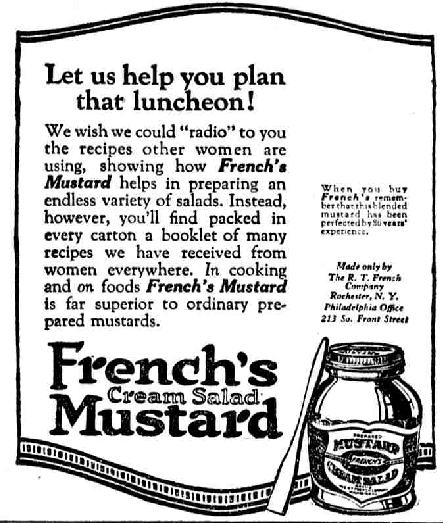
French's Cream Salad Mustard ad from 1922

In 1926, French's was sold to J. & J. Colman of the United Kingdom, a company that produced its own mustard brand and home care products such as Lysol, Reckitt's Blue and Brasso.

In 1928, the Atlantis Sales Corporation was formed as a subsidiary of R. T. French to handle sales and distribution of French's, Reckitt, and Colman products. Atlantis remained a separate entity through the 1950s.

In 1960, French's purchased L.C. Forman and Sons Pickle Company of Pittsford, New York. Forman produced a variety of pickle products, including a well-known piccalilli relish.

In 1965, French's introduced a new line of "Cattlemen’s" barbecue sauce. The line was inaugurated with the trip of a horse-drawn "chuck wagon" from Buffalo, New York, across upstate New York to New York City and then to Philadelphia, Pennsylvania, in June, 1965.

In 1970, the company purchased Widmer Wine Cellars of Naples, New York. The winery was sold in 1983.

In 1971 the company announced construction of a new plant in Springfield, Missouri, which would "ultimately result in the termination of manufacturing operations in Rochester." The headquarters, however, was expected to remain.

In 1985, the company sold its instant potato operations in Shelley, Idaho, to Pillsbury.

In 1986, Reckitt & Colman acquired Durkee Famous Foods; in 1987 and consolidated headquarters in New Jersey. Durkee's French onions became French's crispy fried onions.

In 1999, Reckitt & Colman merged with Benckiser NV to form Reckitt Benckiser.

In 2017, McCormick & Company acquired French's from Reckitt Benckiser.

For many years, the fictitious "Carol French" was the face of the company. Her name appeared on numerous recipes and cookbooks, the oldest of which may be Dining Delights from 1948.

== Locations ==
Until 1987, French's headquarters was located in Rochester, New York. The headquarters is now located in Chester, New Jersey. During its heyday, French's was a sponsor of the local weather forecast, featuring its address prominently in television advertising. They also were a prominent sponsor of the Rochester Red Wings baseball club, often in conjunction with a local brand of hot dogs, Zweigle's. The former headquarters location at 1 Mustard Street is now home to a variety of professional offices and public agencies.

French's also had facilities in Shelley, Idaho, for potato products. A plant in Souderton, Pennsylvania, was constructed in 1957 and closed in the 1990s. A plant in Fresno, California, closed in 1994. Manufacturing operations were consolidated in Springfield, Missouri.

== Products ==
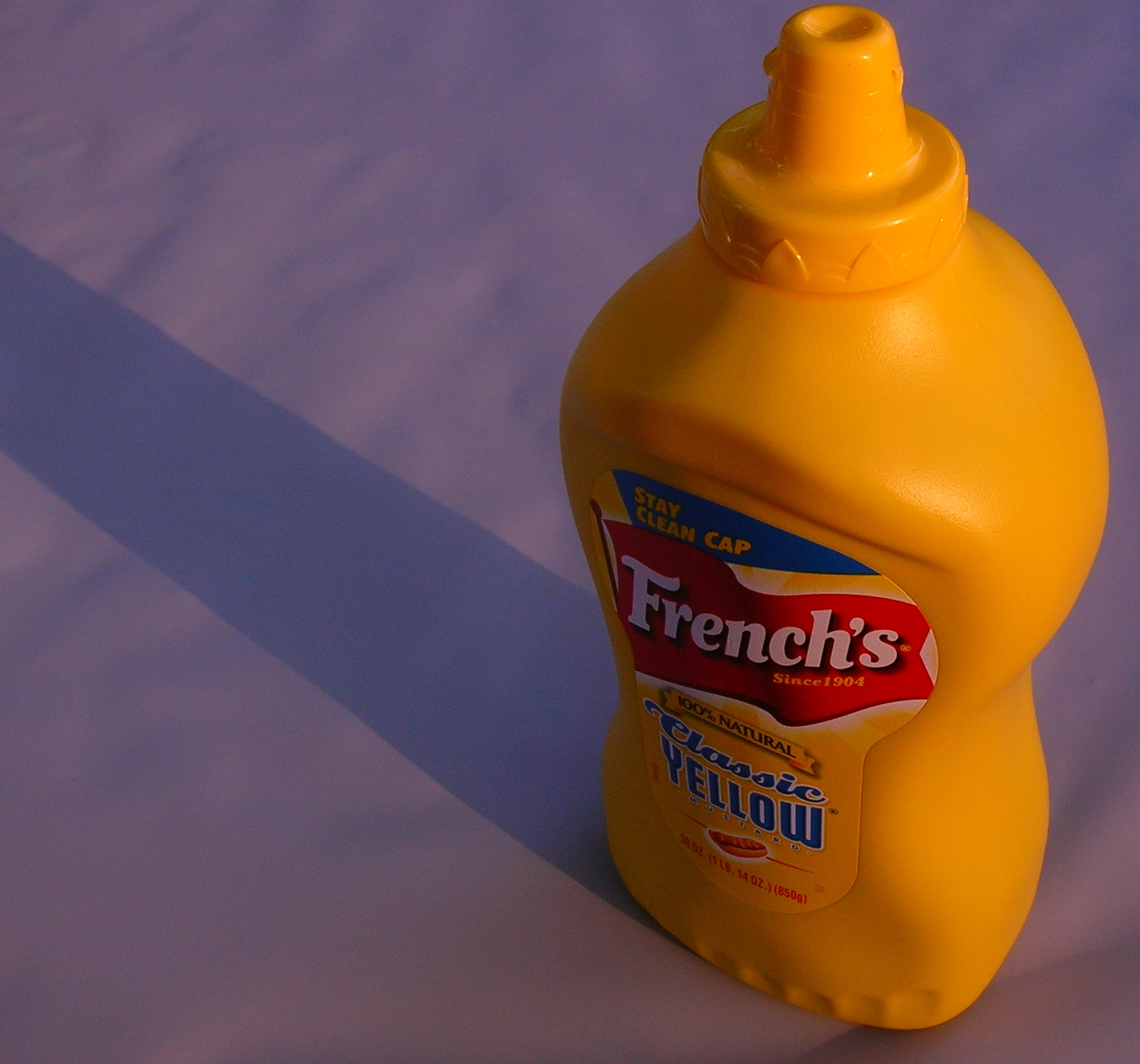
French's classic yellow mustard.

Historically, R. T. French variously manufactured a line of spices and extracts, condiments, pickle products, sauces and gravy mixes, instant potato products, and pet care products, in particular canary and parakeet seeds.

As of 2016, supermarkets stock French's mustards, its popular line of French's fried onions, Worcestershire sauce, a line of mayonnaise-based products, ketchup, barbecue sauce, potato sticks, and fried jalapeños.

== French's "heir" ==
In 1981, a man named Rodney Moquin was convicted of defrauding a number of people by claiming he was heir to the French's Mustard fortune. He accumulated over $40,000 in goods and real-estate (equivalent to $141,600 in 2025) before his arrest.

== See also ==
- List of mustard brands
