= Bill Gray's =

Fast food chain in the Rochester, New York area

Bill Gray's Inc.
- Company type: Private
- Industry: Restaurants
- Founded: 1938
- Headquarters: Webster, New York, United States
- Website: www.billgrays.com

Bill Gray's is a chain of restaurants based in Webster, New York (a suburb of Rochester, New York) that currently has 14 restaurants in the Rochester area in western New York, including seven tap room-style restaurants, and one tavern-style grill named Flaherty's. Ten of these locations also sell Abbott's Frozen Custard.

== History ==
In 1938, Bill and Alberta Gray began selling hot dogs in Webster. Within a few years, Bill Gray's expanded and added multiple items to its menu.

Local businessman Bruce Hegedorn became a partner with Bill Gray in the early 1960s. With Bill as the head of operations and store management and Bruce as the financial person and location expert, they continued to expand and build the restaurant chain. They acquired competitor Tom Wahl's in 1986.

=== Restaurants ===
Bill Gray's mostly operates stand-alone restaurants in Monroe County, New York. The one exception is the facility in the Strong National Museum of Play (Bill Gray's at the Skyliner).

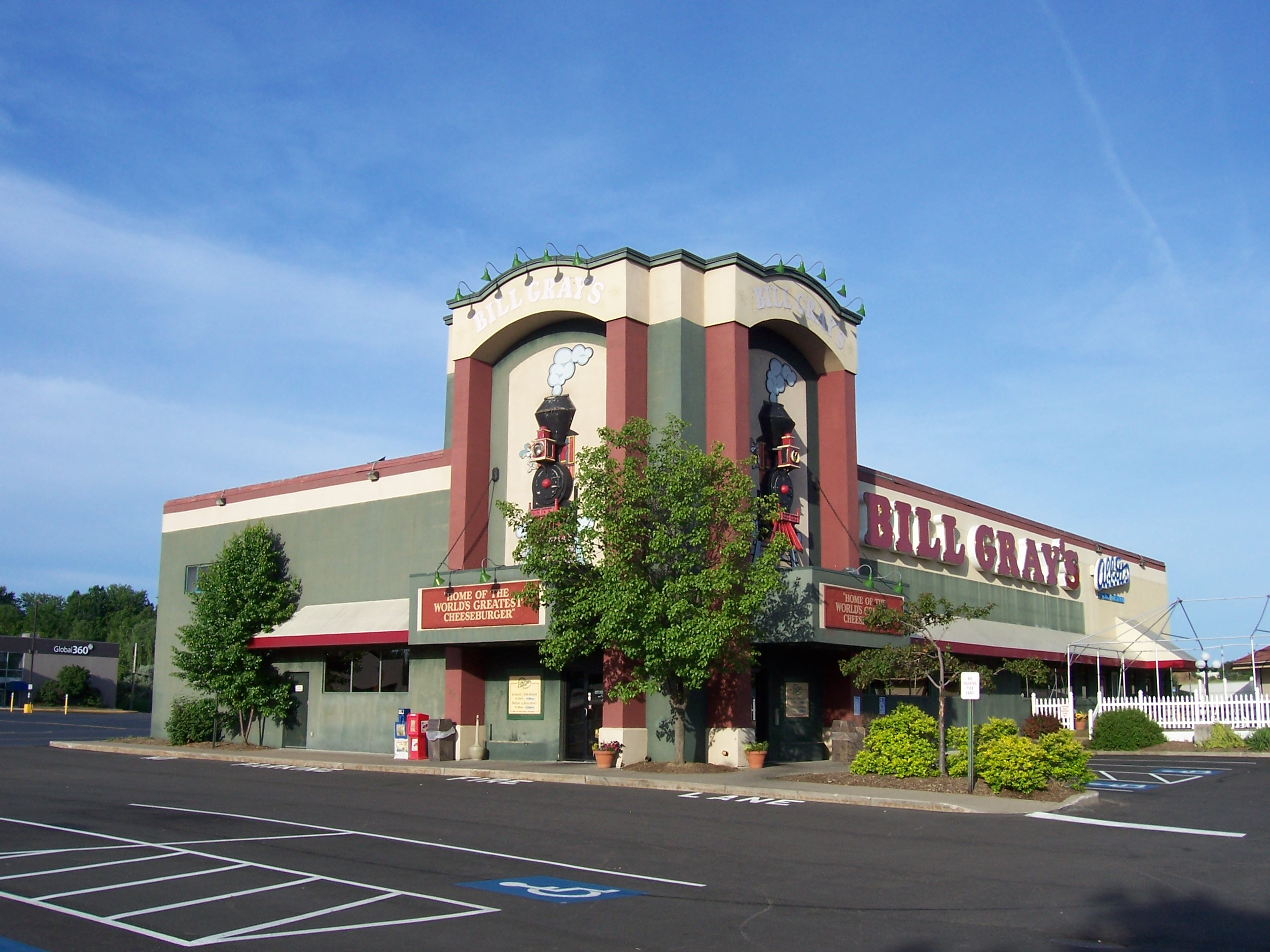
Bill Gray's restaurant in Henrietta, New York

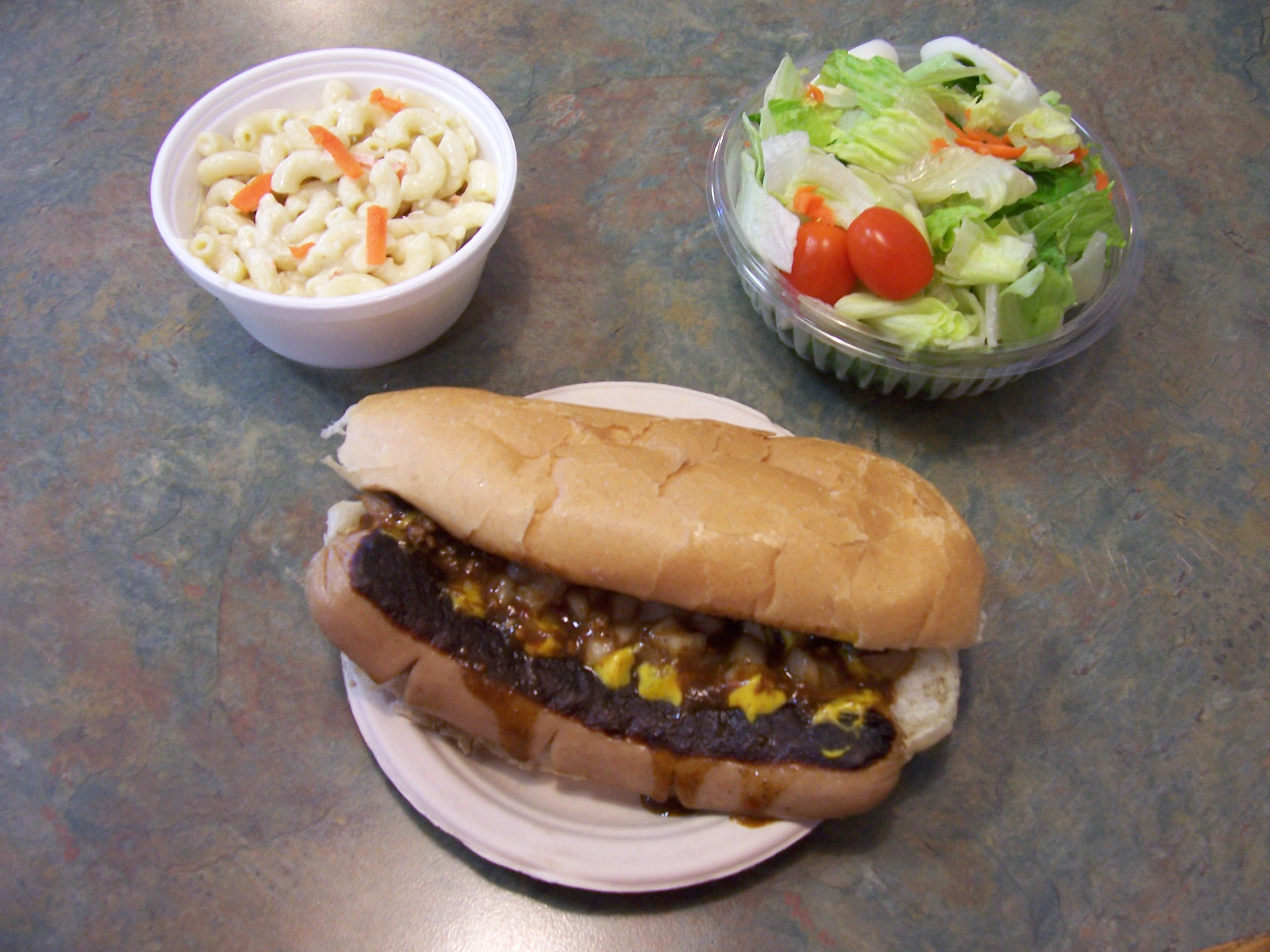
A Bill Gray's 1/4 pound white hot served "Bill's Favorite"-style
