= Blue Swords (horse) =

American-bred Thoroughbred racehorse

- Sire: Blue Larkspur
- Grandsire: Black Servant
- Dam: Flaming Swords
- Damsire: Man o' War
- Sex: Stallion
- Foaled: 1940
- Country: United States
- Color: Bay
- Breeder: Samuel D. Riddle
- Owner: Allen T. Simmons
- Trainer: Walter A. Kelley
- Record: 22: 5-5-2
- Earnings: $58,065

Major wins
- Eastern Shore Handicap (1942); Remsen Handicap (1942); Ardsley Handicap (1942)
- Last updated on November 29, 2006

Blue Swords (1940–1955) was an American Thoroughbred race horse who debuted as a two-year-old in 1942. Bred in Kentucky by Samuel D. Riddle, he was owned by Allen T. Simmons of Akron, Ohio, a rubber mogul and radio station operator. He was rated a close rival of Occupation, owned by Chicago, Illinois contractor John Marsch, in horse racing competition in the Western United States.

Blue Swords was a son of Blue Larkspur and Flaming Swords, whose father was Man o' War. In 22 starts, he earned 5 wins, 5 places, and 2 shows. His career earnings totaled $58,065.

== Racing career ==
=== 1942: two-year-old season ===
Blue Swords finished third in the Washington Park Race Track Futurity event on August 15, 1942. A 20 to 1 shot, he was bested by the winner, Occupation, and Count Fleet, who placed second. On September 3, 1942, he came within 1/5 of a second of the Aqueduct Racetrack track record established by the sprinter Doulrab. Blue Swords bested Col. Teddy by three lengths, finishing with a time of 1:10 3/5.

Blue Swords secured a purse of $10,800 by winning the Eastern Shore Handicap at Havre de Grace, Maryland, on September 12, 1942. He won by a length after taking the lead down the stretch and pulling away comfortably. He ran the six furlongs in 1:12.

On the final day of the Belmont Park fall meeting, October 10, 1942, Count Fleet established a track record by running 1:34 4/5 in the Champagne Stakes. Blue Swords ran second, putting up a strong pursuit. Count Fleet had fractions of 0:23, 0:46, 1:10, and 1:34 4/5. Blue Swords' second position was eight lengths faster than third place Attendant.

In early odds for the 1943 Kentucky Derby, Blue Swords was given an 8 to 1 shot by James J. Carroll, St. Louis, Missouri sports betting commissioner. Also at 8 to 1 were Ocean Wave and Devil's Thumb. Count Fleet was named the favorite at 2 to 1.

On April 8, 1943, Blue Swords finished 11th at Jamaica, New York in the feature race, Experimental handicap. He came in ahead of only four horses at a time when he was considered second to Count Fleet in the Kentucky Derby future books.

=== 1943: three-year-old season ===
Nevertheless, odds makers made Blue Swords a 6 to 1 pick to win the Kentucky Derby prior to the horse's arrival in Louisville, Kentucky, on April 17, 1943. Al Wolf of the Los Angeles Times gave him the edge provided there was mud on the race track.

Blue Swords again failed to perform up to expectations, this time in the Derby Trial. He ran poorly throughout the six furlongs, finishing ahead of just four horses among a field of fifteen. In the Wood Memorial Stakes on April 17, 1943, Count Fleet won handily after Blue Swords led temporarily prior to the half mile mark. At the finish, Count Fleet led Blue Swords by four lengths.

On April 23, 1943, Blue Swords worked out at Churchill Downs, running 3/8 of a mile in :41 2/5. Count Fleet was timed three seconds quicker, clocking in at :38 2/5. On April 30, Blue Swords was given 8 to 1 odds and was assigned the #1 post position.

On May 1, 1943, in front of a crowd of 60,000, Blue Swords finished three lengths behind Count Fleet. Count Fleet's next nearest rival, Slide Rule, was nine lengths in back of him at the end.

== Stud record ==
Retired to stud, of his progeny Blue Man was the top earner whose wins included the 1952 Preakness Stakes.
