= True North I =

American-bred Thoroughbred racehorse

True North
- Sire: Only One
- Grandsire: Lucullite
- Dam: North Riding
- Damsire: High Time
- Sex: Gelding
- Foaled: 1940
- Country: United States
- Colour: Bay
- Breeder: W. Deering Howe
- Owner: W. Deering Howe
- Trainer: Preston M. Burch
- Record: 54: 20-10-4
- Earnings: US$98,695

Major wins
- Aberdeen Stakes (1942); Hialeah Juvenile Stakes (1942); Fall Highweight Handicap (1945); Gideon Putnam Handicap (1945); W. P. Burch Memorial Handicap (1946); Interborough Handicap (1946)

Honours
- True North Handicap at Belmont Park

True North (foaled 1940) was a successful American Thoroughbred racehorse for which the True North Handicap at Belmont Park is named.

== Background ==
True North was bred and raced by businessman W. Deering Howe, a grandson of Charles Deering, Chairman of the Board of Directors and a founding major shareholder in International Harvester. True North was trained by future U.S. Racing Hall of Fame inductee, Preston M. Burch.

== Racing career ==
True North's wins included the Fall Highweight Handicap in 1945 and the Interborough Handicap in 1946.

== Pedigree ==
Pedigree of True North
Sire Only One	Lucullite	Trap Rock	Rock Sand
Sire Only One	Lucullite	Trap Rock	Topiary
Sire Only One	Lucullite	Lucky Lass	Ormondale
Sire Only One	Lucullite	Lucky Lass	Lux Casta
Sire Only One	Orissa	Purchase	Ormondale
Sire Only One	Orissa	Purchase	Cherryola
Sire Only One	Orissa	Durbar	Chicle
Sire Only One	Orissa	Durbar	Pageant
Dam North Riding	High Time	Ultimus	Commando
Dam North Riding	High Time	Ultimus	Running Stream
Dam North Riding	High Time	Noonday	Domino
Dam North Riding	High Time	Noonday	Sundown
Dam North Riding	Scarborough	Bridge of Earn	Cyllene
Dam North Riding	Scarborough	Bridge of Earn	Santa Brigida
Dam North Riding	Scarborough	Scaramuccia	Spearmint
Dam North Riding	Scarborough	Scaramuccia	Spring Chicken
