= La Verdad (horse) =

American-bred Thoroughbred racehorse

- Sire: Yes It's True
- Grandsire: Is It True
- Dam: Noble Fire
- Damsire: Hook and Ladder
- Sex: Mare
- Foaled: April 29, 2010
- Died: May 10, 2020
- Country: United States
- Colour: Bay
- Breeder: Eklektikos Stable
- Owner: Lady Sheila Stable (Sheila Rosenblum)
- Trainer: Linda Rice
- Record: 25: 16-3-0
- Earnings: US$1,563,200

Major wins
- Distaff Handicap (2014, 2015); Vagrancy Handicap (2015); Gallant Bloom Handicap (2015); Interborough Stakes (2016)

Awards
- American Champion Female Sprint Horse (2015)
- Last updated on 1 February 2016

La Verdad (29 April 2010 – 10 May 2020) was an American Thoroughbred racehorse. She was bred in New York by Eklektikos Stable and was owned by Sheila Rosenblum's Lady Sheila Stable. A winner of 16 races from 25 starts, she won the Eclipse Award as American Champion Female Sprint Horse for her accomplishments in 2015.

La Verdad was trained by Linda Rice and primarily ridden by jockey José Ortiz.

== Background ==
The phrase "la verdad" means "the truth" in Spanish. La Verdad's sire is Yes It's True, a multiple graded stakes winner who placed in 15 stakes races during his career, including victories in the Grade 1 De Francis Dash, Grade 2 Riva Ridge and six Grade 3 events. Her mother, Noble Fire, was sired by Hook and Ladder, a two-time graded stakes winner in Florida.

== Racing career ==
=== 2013: three-year-old season ===
La Verdad began her racing career at the age of three against New York-breds. She broke her maiden in her second lifetime start at Aqueduct on April 7, winning a six furlong sprint by 6 3/4 lengths under the colors of her breeder Eklektikos. After winning her next start in restricted allowance company at Belmont Park on May 8, she was laid up until November, winning another restricted allowance at Aqueduct by 8 3/4 lengths.

La Verdad was then purchased privately by Sheila Rosenblum at the suggestion of the horse's trainer, Linda Rice. "There was a little bit of a delicate situation with the owner and I was asked to come in and kind of save the day", Rosenblum said, adding that she decided to go out on a limb and "go for it" with regards to the purchase.

La Verdad's final start of the year, on December 19 at Aqueduct, was her first race against open company. After yielding the lead midway through the six furlong race, she came back at the top of the stretch and drew clear to win by two lengths.

=== 2014: four-year-old season ===
After winning her 2014 debut against a short field at Aqueduct on January 17, La Verdad was entered to compete in her first graded stakes race – the Barbara Fritchie at Laurel Park – which would also be her first race at seven furlongs. Going off as the second choice, La Verdad established the lead early, but could not hold off the stalking My Wandy's Girl, losing by a length.

One month later, on March 29, La Verdad won her first stakes race, the Broadway at Aqueduct, against New York-breds. The Broadway was the first of four straight wins for La Verdad, which included her first graded stakes victory in the Distaff at Aqueduct on April 19, and the Critical Eye and Dancin Renee Stakes at Belmont Park against New York-breds.

La Verdad then shipped north to Saratoga where she was unsuccessful in two graded stakes starts, finishing fifth in both the six-furlong Honorable Miss and the seven-furlong Ballerina.

After losing narrowly to Artemis Agrotera in the Grade 2 Gallant Bloom at Belmont, La Verdad returned to the winner's circle on October 18, winning the Iroquois Stakes against state-breds on New York Showcase Day. Her 2014 campaign ended with a loss in the Fall Highweight at Aqueduct – her first race against male horses.

=== 2015: five-year-old season ===
La Verdad's championship season was highlighted with victories in six straight stakes races on the New York sprint circuit, starting with her second win in the Distaff on April 18 at Aqueduct. She followed that with a win in the Grade 3 Vagrancy at Belmont on May 16, and a repeat victory in the Dancin Renee against state-breds at Belmont on June 28.

La Verdad then returned to Saratoga for her second Honorable Miss stakes. Sent off as the second choice behind Judy the Beauty, La Verdad led at every pole, winning by 4 lengths. Her victory, however, would be rescinded by the New York State Gaming Commission due to a medication violation.

Following the Honorable Miss, La Verdad won the Grade 2 Gallant Bloom at Belmont in late September, fighting off a late challenge by the Chad Brown-trained Wavell Avenue.

With a possible start in the Grade 1 Breeders' Cup Filly & Mare Sprint at Keeneland on the radar, Linda Rice decided to send La Verdad to her third title defense of the year: the Iroquois against state-breds at Belmont, which would be run just one week before the Breeders' Cup race. La Verdad easily defended her Iroquois title, coming from off the pace to win. After the Iroquois, the decision was made to pay the $100,000 supplement to the Breeders' Cup.

The fourth betting choice in the seven-furlong Breeders' Cup Filly & Mare Sprint, La Verdad returned to her on-the-lead running style. Despite the one-week layoff, she fought off several challenges. Her valiant efforts would be thwarted by Gallant Bloom foe Wavell Avenue, who surged and passed La Verdad in the late stages to win by 1 3/4 lengths. Sheila Rosenblum said afterward that she was "thrilled to take second", saying that La Verdad "ran some hell of a race."

La Verdad had been considered for the Fasig-Tipton auctions in November, but was withdrawn in order to continue racing. She concluded her 2015 season competing in her second Fall Heighweight at Aqueduct, finishing sixth.

La Verdad edged Wavell Avenue by eight first-place votes, 98–90, to win the Eclipse Award as American Champion Female Sprint Horse. At the New York Thoroughbred Breeders Awards held in April 2016, she was named Champion Female Sprinter and Older Dirt Female.

== Retirement ==
On January 9, 2016 – three days after she was announced as an Eclipse Award finalist – La Verdad ran in what would end up being her final career start, winning the listed Interborough at Aqueduct in wire-to-wire fashion.

La Verdad had been considered for the Barbara Fritchie at Laurel in February, but on January 31 Sheila Rosenblum and Linda Rice decided to retire the horse. Rice said that she and Rosenblum wanted La Verdad to go out on top following her Eclipse Award and Interborough victories.

Following her retirement, La Verdad foaled a filly by Travers winner Medaglia D'Oro (2017), a filly by leading sire Tapit (2018) and a filly by two-time Horse of the Year Curlin (2019). Shortly before her death in May 2020, she foaled a colt by Grade 1 winner Into Mischief.

=== Death ===
La Verdad was humanely euthanized on May 10, 2020, due to colic complications.
