= Safely Kept Stakes top three finishers =

This is a listing of the horses that finished in either first, second, or third place and the number of starters in the Safely Kept Breeders' Cup Stakes, a grade 3 American thoroughbred race for three-year-old fillies run at six furlongs on dirt at Laurel Park Racecourse in Laurel, Maryland.

Year	Winner	Second	Third	Starters
2021				-
2020	Hello Beautiful	Reagan's Edge	Landing Zone	9
2019	Needs Supervision	Hey Mamaluke	Victim of Love	11
2018	America's Tale	Estilo Femenino	Majestic Reason	8
2017	Berned	Your Love	Shimmering Aspen	11
2016	Tale for Ruby	Takrees	Outsider Art	14
2015	Hot City Girl	Stroke Play	Paulassilverlining	12
2014	Who's In Town	Shayjolie	True Romance	14
2013	Lady Sabelia	Flattering Bea	Crazy About Me	11
2012	Greed and Fear	Holiday Soiree	Los Ojitos	9
2011	No Race	No Race	No Race	0
2010	No Race	No Race	No Race	0
2009	No Race	No Race	No Race	0
2009	No Race	No Race	No Race	0
2008	No Race	No Race	No Race	0
2007	Sindey with an S	Ticket to Seattle	Change Up	7
2006	Wild Gams	Wildcat Bettie B	G City Gal	8
2005	Trickle of Gold	Maddalena	Partners Due	5
2004	Bending Strings	Smokey Glacken	Then She Laughs	6
2003	Randaroo	Follow Me Home	Awesome Charm	8
2002	Miss Lodi	For Rubies	Wilzada	8
2001	Kimbralata	Carafe	Stormy Pick	8
2000	Swept Away	Another	Cat Cay	8
1999	Godmother	Superduper Miss	Rills	7
1998	Hair Spray	Expensive Issue	Ninth Inning	8
1997	Weather Vane	Vegas Prospector	Requesting More	7
1996	J J's Dream	Flat Fleet Feet	Rare Blend	5
1995	Broad Smile	Scotzanna	Shebatim's Trick	7
1994	Twist Afleet	Penny's Reshoot	Our Royal Blue	7
1993	Miss Indy Anna	Ann Dear	Lily of the North	7
1992	Meafara	Squirm	Super Doer	6
1991	Missy's Mirage	Withallprobability	Corporate Fund	5
1990	Voodoo Lily	Miss Spentyouth	Catchamenot	8
1989	Safely Kept	Cojinx	Kathleen the Queen	5
1988	Clever Power	Lake Valley	Ready Jet Go	8
1987	Endless Surprise	Bea Quality	Miracle Wood	7
1986	Debtor's Prison	Night Above	Bea Quality	6

== See also ==
- Safely Kept Stakes
- Laurel Park Racecourse
- American Champion Female Sprint Horse
- Breeders' Cup Filly & Mare Sprint
