= Safely Kept Stakes =

- Class: Grade III
- Location: Laurel Park Racecourse, Laurel, Maryland, United States
- Inaugurated: 1986
- Race type: Thoroughbred – Flat racing
- Website: www.laurelpark.com

Race information
- Distance: 7 furlong sprint
- Surface: Dirt
- Track: left-handed
- Qualification: Three-year-olds fillies
- Weight: Assigned
- Purse: $125,000

The Safely Kept Stakes is an American Thoroughbred horse race run annually at Laurel Park Racecourse in Laurel, Maryland. Open to fillies aged three, it is competed on dirt over a distance of seven furlongs. Run during October, it offers a purse of $100,000.

The Safely Kept Breeders' Cup Stakes is one of the top sprints for three-year-old fillies in the country. One of the few six-furlong contests with graded status for three-year-olds that leads to the Breeders' Cup Filly & Mare Sprint. It was inaugurated in 1986 as the Columbia Stakes. The stakes record is held by Godmother who finished the six furlongs in 1:09.21.

The race is named in honor of Jayeff "B" Stable's and Barry Weisbord's 1989 Eclipse Award Champion Sprinter and 1989 Columbia Stakes winner Safely Kept in 1996. The race has been called several different titles beginning with Columbia Handicap (after a nearby town in Maryland) from 1986–1987, then the Columbia Stakes from 1989–1995.

The race was at Pimlico Race Course in Baltimore, Maryland and has been moved to back and forth from Laurel to Pimlico depending on dates that were assigned by the Maryland Racing Commission. The race was held at Pimlico in 1986–1987, 1989, and 1991–1996. The race was run at Colonial Downs in New Kent, Virginia in 1997. The race was run at Laurel in 1988, 1990, 1998–2000 and from 2006 to present. The race was run at 6 1/2 furlongs in 1987 and 1988.

The Safely Kept Breeders' Cup Stakes was given Graded stakes status in 1990. On August 7, 2008 it was announced that the race would be on hiatus for 2008, the Maryland Jockey Club cited financial distress as the reason for the races' cancellation. The annual grading session of the American Graded Stakes Committee listed Safely Kept S. at Laurel Park not eligible for grading for 2010.

== Records ==
Speed record:

- 6 furlongs – 1:09.12 – Miss Indy Anna (1993)
- 6.5 furlongs – 1:16.40 – Clever Power (1988)
- 7 furlongs – 1:23.68 – Who's In Town (2014)

Most wins by a horse:

- No horse has won the Safely Kept Stakes more than once

Most wins by a jockey:

- 3 – Mario Pino (1996, 1997 & 1999)

Most wins by a trainer:

- 2 – Kiaran McLaughlin (2003 & 2004)

Most wins by an owner:

- 2 – H. Joseph Allen (1990 & 2003)
- 2 – Robert E. Meyerhoff (1995 & 1998)

== Winners of the "Safely Kept Stakes" since 1986 ==
Year	Winner	Jockey	Trainer	Owner	Dist.	Time	Purse	Gr.
2021					7 fur	0:00.00	$100,000	
2020	Hello Beautiful	Sheldon Russell	Brittany T. Russell	Madaket Stables LLC,	7 fur	1:22.26	$100,000	
2019	Needs Supervision	Feargal Lynch	Jeremiah O'Dwyer	Howling Pigeons Farm	7 fur	1:23.51	$100,000	
2018	America's Tale	Trevor McCarthy	Bernie Flint	Naveed Chowhan	7 fur	1:23.97	$100,000	
2017	Berned	Feargal Lynch	Graham Motion	Three C Stables, etc.	7 fur	1:22.54	$100,000	
2016	Tale for Ruby	Edgar Prado	Barclay Tagg	Charles Fipke	7 fur	1:23.51	$100,000	
2015	Hot City Girl	Cornelio Velásquez	Linda Rice	Lady Sheila Stable	6 fur	1:09.67	$100,000	
2014	Who's In Town	Julian Pimentel	Michael Matz	Richard Golden	7 fur	1:23.68	$100,000	
2013	Lady Sabelia	Horacio Karamanos	Robin Graham	Mrs. Frank P. Wright	7 fur	1:23.97	$100,000	
2012	Greed and Fear	Horacio Karamanos	Rudy Rodriguez	Michael Dubb	7 fur	1:25.13	$125,000	
2011	no race	no race	no race	no race	7 fur	1:25.13	$125,000	
2010	no race	no race	no race	no race	7 fur	1:25.13	$125,000	
2009	no race	no race	no race	no race	7 fur	1:25.13	$125,000	
2008	no race	no race	no race	no race	7 fur	1:25.13	$125,000	
2007	Sindy with an S	Jeremy Rose	Mike R. Mitchell	Dream Stable, LLC	6 fur	1:10.16	$200,000	III
2006	Wild Gams	Ryan Fogelsonger	Ben Perkins Jr.	Everett B. Novak	6 fur	1:09.93	$200,000	III
2005	Trikle of Gold	Jeremy Rose	Michael Gorham	John Murphy	6 fur	1:10.45	$150,000	III
2004	Bending Strings	Hector Karamanos	Kiaran McLaughlin	John Gunther	6 fur	1:10.11	$150,000	III
2003	Randaroo	Heberto Castillo	Kiaran McLaughlin	H. Joseph Allen	6 fur	1:10.54	$150,000	III
2002	Miss Lodi	Ryan Fogelsonger	Thomas M. Amoss	Richard Colton & Henry Mast	6 fur	1:11.20	$150,000	III
2001	Kimbralata	Travis Dunkelberger	Dale Capuano	Donald Mensh	6 fur	1:11.20	$100,000	III
2000	Swept Away	Jeremy A. Beasley	Bernard Flint	Rich Bertram & Elaine Klein	6 fur	1:09.51	$100,000	III
1999	Godfather	Mario Pino	Robert W. Camac	Arthur I. Appleton	6 fur	1:09.21	$100,000	III
1998	Hair Spray	José A. Vélez Jr.	Charlie Whittingham	Robert E. Meyerhoff	6 fur	1:10.67	$110,000	III
1997	Weather Vane	Mario Pino	Richard Delp	Par Four Racing Stable	6 fur	1:10.21	$110,000	III
1996	J J's Dream	Mario Pino	Eddie Plesa Jr.	John A. Franks	6 fur	1:09.45	$100,000	III
1995	Broad Smile	Jerilyn Brown	Richard W. Small	Robert E. Meyerhoff	6 fur	1:10.30	$100,000	III
1994	Twist Afleet	Dennis Carr	John C. Kimmel	Lucille Conover	6 fur	1:10.88	$100,000	III
1993	Miss Indy Anna	B. Douglas Thomas	Ned Allard	Charles T. Matses	6 fur	1:09.12	$100,000	III
1992	Meafara	Brian Swatuk	Leslie Ahrens	Frank Muench	6 fur	1:10.55	$100,000	III
1991	Missy's Mirage	Herb McCauley	H. Allen Jerkens	Middletown Stable	6 fur	1:10.53	$100,000	III
1990	Voodoo Lily	Kent Desormeaux	D. Wayne Lukas	H. Joseph Allen	6 fur	1:10.60	$100,000	III
1989	Safely Kept	Craig Perret	Alan E. Goldberg	Jayeff B Stab/Barry Weisbord	6 fur	1:11.20	$100,000	III
1988	Clever Power	Julie Krone	Richard E. Dutrow Sr.	Marvin Moncrief	6 1/2 fur	1:16.40	$110,000	
1987	Endless Surprise	Kent Desormeaux	Hyman Ravich	Peter Angelos	6 1/2 fur	1:17.40	$47,250	
1986	Debtor's Prison	David Byrnes	Not Found	Not Found	6 fur	1:11.40	$47,000	

== See also ==
- Safely Kept Stakes top three finishers
- American Champion Female Sprint Horse
