= Walter A. Kelley =

American horse racing trainer

Walter Kelley
Personal information
- Born: February 18, 1907 Brooklyn, New York
- Died: March 1, 2000 (aged 93) Coral Gables, Florida
- Occupations: Jockey, Trainer

Horse racing career
- Sport: Horse racing

Major racing wins
- Ardsley Handicap (1942); Eastern Shore Handicap (1942); Remsen Stakes (1942); Miami Beach Handicap (1944); Fashion Stakes (1951); National Stallion Stakes (filly division) (1951); Garden State Stakes (1955); Hawthorne Gold Cup Handicap (1959); Suwannee River Handicap (1959); New York Stakes (1960); Manhattan Handicap (1961); Sanford Stakes (1962); Gallant Fox Handicap (1963); Forego Handicap (1985); Mohawk Stakes (1978); Bay Shore Handicap (1979); Discovery Handicap (1979); Jamaica Handicap (1979); Keystone Stakes (1979); Palisades Handicap (1979); Hialeah Sprint Championship Handicap (1980); Tallahassee Handicap (1980)

Significant horses
- Belle's Gold, Blue Swords, Day Court, John's Treasure, Nickel Boy, Oil Rich, Prince John, Rash Prince, Ziggy's Boy

Walter Aloysius Kelley (February 18, 1907 - March 1, 2000) was an American Thoroughbred horse racing trainer. Although he began his career as a jockey, he is best known as a trainer who first operated a public stable in 1930 and whose career saw him have second-place finishers in each of the U.S. Triple Crown races.

== Racing career ==
Walter Kelley began his career as a jockey, riding in California where he got his first win in 1922 at Tanforan Racetrack.

=== Triple Crown results ===
In 1942 and 1943, Walter Kelley trained Blue Swords for Akron, Ohio radio station owner Allen T. Simmons. Under future U.S. Racing Hall of Fame jockey Johnny Adams, Blue Swords would finish second in both the Kentucky Derby and the Preakness Stakes to eventual U.S. Triple Crown winner Count Fleet.

43 years later when Walter Kelley was 79, he saddled his first Belmont Stakes runner. John's Treasure, owned by Dallas, Texas businessman John R. Murrell, finished second to winner Danzig Connection but ahead of 1986 Kentucky Derby winner Ferdinand. The tragic ending of Ferdinand in a Japanese slaughterhouse would be a catalyst for passionate owner John Murrell to provide substantial funding to rescue racehorses from that ending.

Walter Kelley was living in Coral Gables, Florida at the time of his passing at age ninety-three.
