= Blue Man (horse) =

American-bred Thoroughbred racehorse

- Sire: Blue Swords
- Grandsire: Blue Larkspur
- Dam: Poppycock
- Damsire: Identify
- Sex: Stallion
- Foaled: 1949
- Country: United States
- Colour: Bay
- Breeder: Allen T. Simmons
- Owner: 1) White Oak Stable; 2) Frank R. Conklin
- Trainer: Woody Stephens
- Record: 24: 11-4-1
- Earnings: $277,035

Major wins
- Flamingo Stakes (1952); Yankee Handicap (1952); Dwyer Stakes (1952) Triple Crown race wins: Preakness Stakes (1952)

Blue Man (foaled 1949) was an American Thoroughbred racehorse best known for winning the Preakness Stakes.

== Background ==
Blue Man was bred by Allen T. Simmons at his Lexington, Kentucky horse farm, a property that had been part of the renowned Idle Hour Stock Farm. Blue Man's dam was Poppycock, a granddaughter of Man o' War. His sire was Blue Swords, who won several handicaps and ran second to Count Fleet in the Kentucky Derby and Preakness Stakes. Grandsire Blue Larkspur was the 1929 American Horse of the Year and a U.S. Racing Hall of Fame inductee.

Blue Man was owned by Arthur Abbott of Rye, New York, founder of Abbott's Frozen Custard, who raced him under the White Oak Stable banner. He was trained by future Hall of Fame inductee Woody Stephens.

== Racing career ==
=== Early races ===
At age two Blue Man showed limited racing ability. In the spring of 1952, the then three-year-old colt won the important Flamingo Stakes at Hialeah Park in Florida. In the ensuing Kentucky Derby, he finished third to winner Hill Gail, then won the most important race of his career in the second leg of the U.S. Triple Crown series.

=== 1952 Preakness Stakes ===
Derby winner Hill Gail had to be withdrawn from the Preakness as a result of an injury, but Blue Man still faced a solid field led by Walter M. Jeffords' highly regarded One Count, who was to be ridden by star jockey, Eddie Arcaro. Blue Man was ridden by Conn McCreary, a top jockey and future Hall of Fame inductee who had won the 1944 Preakness and was known for his dramatic come-from behind rides. In typical McCreary style, by the time he and Blue Man reached the three-quarter pole they were at the back of the pack, running ahead of just one other horse. One by one, they began passing the field, then pulled away in the homestretch to win by 3 1/2 lengths. For trainer Woody Stephens, Blue Man was his first of nine Preakness starters and his only winner.

=== Later races ===
Sent to compete in the final leg of the Triple Crown, the 1 1 /2 mile Belmont Stakes, Blue Man ran second to One Count. That year, Blue Man won other important races such as the Yankee Handicap at East Boston's Suffolk Downs and the Dwyer Stakes held that year at the Old Aqueduct Racetrack.

== Stud record ==
Retired to stud duty, in 1958 Blue Man was sold to Canadian breeder Frank R. Conklin who stood him at his Midway Farm in Brantford, Ontario. Successful as a sire and damsire, Blue Man produced a number of Canadian stakes race winners.

== Pedigree ==
Pedigree of Blue Man
Sire Blue Swords bay 1940	Blue Larkspur bay 1926	Black Servant	Black Toney
Sire Blue Swords bay 1940	Blue Larkspur bay 1926	Black Servant	Padula
Sire Blue Swords bay 1940	Blue Larkspur bay 1926	Blossum Time	North Star
Sire Blue Swords bay 1940	Blue Larkspur bay 1926	Blossum Time	Vaila
Sire Blue Swords bay 1940	Flaming Swords brown 1933	Man o' War*	Fair Play*
Sire Blue Swords bay 1940	Flaming Swords brown 1933	Man o' War*	Mahubah*
Sire Blue Swords bay 1940	Flaming Swords brown 1933	Exalted	High Time
Sire Blue Swords bay 1940	Flaming Swords brown 1933	Exalted	Lady Comfey
Dam Poppycock brown 1939	Identify ch. 1931	Man o' War*	Fair Play*
Dam Poppycock brown 1939	Identify ch. 1931	Man o' War*	Mahubah*
Dam Poppycock brown 1939	Identify ch. 1931	Footprint	Grand Parade
Dam Poppycock brown 1939	Identify ch. 1931	Footprint	Trace
Dam Poppycock brown 1939	Foxiana bay 1929	Stefan the Great	The Tetrarch
Dam Poppycock brown 1939	Foxiana bay 1929	Stefan the Great	Perfect Peach
Dam Poppycock brown 1939	Foxiana bay 1929	Istar	Von Tromp
Dam Poppycock brown 1939	Foxiana bay 1929	Istar	Ishtar (Family 13-c)

* Blue Man is inbred 3S x 3D to the stallion Man o'War, meaning that he appears third generation on the sire side of his pedigree, and third generation on the dam side of his pedigree.
