= Gallant Bloom Stakes =

American horse race

- Class: Grade II
- Location: Aqueduct Racetrack; South Ozone Park, New York, United States
- Inaugurated: 1992 (as Gallant Bloom Stakes at Saratoga Racetrack)
- Race type: Thoroughbred – Flat racing
- Website: NYRA

Race information
- Distance: 6 1/2 furlongs.
- Surface: Dirt
- Track: left-handed
- Qualification: Fillies & Mares, three-years-old and older
- Weight: Weight-for-age with allowances
- Purse: US$250,000 (since 2021)

The Gallant Bloom Stakes is a Grade II American Thoroughbred horse race for fillies and mares that are three years old and older run over a distance of 6 1/2 furlongs on the dirt held annually in late September at Belmont Park in Elmont, New York. It has been run at nearby Aqueduct Racetrack since 2022 due to construction at Belmont.

== History ==
The event is named in honor of Gallant Bloom who won the Eclipse Award for Outstanding Two-Year-Old Filly champion of 1968, the 1969 American Champion Three-Year-Old Filly and the 1969 American Champion Older Female Horse. In The Blood-Horse ranking of the top 100 U.S. thoroughbred champions of the 20th Century, Gallant Bloom is ranked #79.

The event was inaugurated on 30 August 1992 at Saratoga Race Course as a race for three-year-old fillies over six furlongs and was won by the Canadian bred filly Apelia, who defeated the Grade I Frizette Stakes winner Preach by 2 3/4 lengths. Later, in 2014 Apelia would be honored into the Canadian Horse Racing Hall of Fame.

After a one-year break, the Gallant Bloom resumed in 1994 at Belmont Park with handicap conditions for fillies and mares. In 1995 the distance of the event was increased to 6 1/2 furlongs.

In 1997 the event was classified as Grade III and was upgraded to Grade II in 2001.

The quality of the entrants for the event has justified its high status. The 2007 Breeders' Cup Juvenile Fillies winner Indian Blessing won this event twice and is the only dual winner to date. In 2008 Indian Blessing went onto be crowned American Champion Female Sprint Horse.

In 2022 the event was moved to Aqueduct Racetrack due to infield tunnel and redevelopment work at Belmont Park. The race also changed from handicap to weight-for-age conditions with allowances.

== Records ==
Speed record:

- 6 1/2 furlongs: 1:14.71 – Dust and Diamonds (2012)

Margins:

- 7 1/4 lengths – Frank's Rockette (2020)

Most wins:

- 2 – Indian Blessing (2008, 2009)
- 2 - R Disaster (2025, 2026)

Most wins by a jockey:

- 5 – John Velazquez (1997, 2001, 2004, 2009, 2016)

Most wins by a trainer:

- 4 – Steven M. Asmussen (2004, 2012, 2013, 2018)

Most wins by an owner:

- 2 – Patti & Hal Earnhardt III (2008, 2009)
- 2 – Mary & Chester Broman Sr. (2014, 2017)
- 2 - Averill Racing & Anthony Mattera (2025, 2026)

== Winners ==
Year	Winner	Age	Jockey	Trainer	Owner	Distance	Time	Purse	Grade	Ref
At Belmont - Gallant Bloom Stakes
2026	R Disaster	5	Jose L. Ortiz	Saffie A. Joseph Jr.	Averill Racing and Anthony Mattera	6 1/2 furlongs	1:16.17	$250,000	II	
At Aqueduct
2025	R Disaster	4	José Ortiz	Saffie A. Joseph Jr.	Averill Racing LLC, Two Eight Racing & Anthony Mattera	6 1/2 furlongs	1:14.78	$250,000	II	
2024	Ways and Means	3	Flavien Prat	Chad C. Brown	Klaravich Stables	6 1/2 furlongs	1:15.46	$242,500	II	
2023	Caramel Swirl †	5	Junior Alvarado	William I. Mott	Godolphin	6 1/2 furlongs	1:16.18	$250,000	II	
2022	Kimari	5	Joel Rosario	Wesley A. Ward	Jonathan Poulin, Westerberg, Derrick Smith, Mrs. John Magnier & Michael Tabor	6 1/2 furlongs	1:16.58	$242,500	II	
At Belmont Park – Gallant Bloom Handicap
2021	Bella Sofia	3	Luis Saez	Rudy Rodriguez	Michael Imperio, Medallion Racing, Sofia Soares, Vincent S. Scuderi & Parkland Thoroughbreds	6 1/2 furlongs	1:15.69	$232,500	II	
2020	Frank's Rockette	3	Junior Alvarado	William I. Mott	Frank Fletcher Racing Operations	6 1/2 furlongs	1:16.12	$145,500	II	
2019	Come Dancing	5	Javier Castellano	Carlos F. Martin	Blue Devil Racing Stable	6 1/2 furlongs	1:14.96	$300,750	II	
2018	Union Strike	4	José L. Ortiz	Steven M. Asmussen	Mick & Wendy Ruis	6 1/2 furlongs	1:15.24	$300,600	II	
2017	Highway Star	4	Luis Saez	Rodrigo A. Ubillo	Mary & Chester Broman Sr.	6 1/2 furlongs	1:16.91	$300,000	II	
2016	Paulassilverlining	4	John R. Velazquez	Michelle Nevin	Vincent S. Scuderi	6 1/2 furlongs	1:15.92	$300,000	II	
2015	La Verdad	5	José L. Ortiz	Linda L. Rice	Lady Sheila Stable	6 1/2 furlongs	1:15.16	$300,000	II	
2014	Artemis Agrotera	3	Rajiv Maragh	Michael E. Hushion	Mary & Chester Broman Sr.	6 1/2 furlongs	1:15.49	$300,000	II	
2013	Cluster of Stars	4	Javier Castellano	Steven M. Asmussen	Turtle Bird Stable	6 1/2 furlongs	1:15.75	$300,000	II	
2012	Dust and Diamonds	4	Julien R. Leparoux	Steven M. Asmussen	Padua Stables	6 1/2 furlongs	1:14.71	$200,000	II	
2011	Pomeroys Pistol	3	Javier Castellano	Amy Tarrant	Amy Tarrant	6 1/2 furlongs	1:16.60	$150,000	II	
2010	My Jen	3	Julien R. Leparoux	Eddie Kenneally	Windmill Manor Farm	6 1/2 furlongs	1:17.13	$150,000	II	
2009	Indian Blessing	4	John R. Velazquez	Bob Baffert	Patti & Hal Earnhardt III	6 1/2 furlongs	1:15.29	$156,500	II	
2008	Indian Blessing	3	Corey Nakatani	Bob Baffert	Patti & Hal Earnhardt III	6 1/2 furlongs	1:16.24	$142,500	II	
2007	Jazzy (ARG)	5	Garrett K. Gomez	Mark A. Hennig	Team Valor Stable, Des Scott & Robert Muir	6 1/2 furlongs	1:16.71	$147,000	II	
2006	Great Intentions	6	Javier Castellano	Michael E. Hushion	Barry K. Schwartz	6 1/2 furlongs	1:16.13	$150,000	II	
2005	Umpateedle	6	Aaron Gryder	Mark Shuman	Michael Gill	6 1/2 furlongs	1:16.35	$147,000	II	
2004	Lady Tak	4	John R. Velazquez	Steven M. Asmussen	Heiligbrodt Racing Stable	6 1/2 furlongs	1:16.04	$150,000	II	
2003	Harmony Lodge	5	Richard Migliore	Todd A. Pletcher	Laura & Eugene Melnyk	6 1/2 furlongs	1:16.20	$150,000	II	
2002	Nasty Storm	4	José A. Santos	Dallas Stewart	Denny Crum, Daryl Elser, Riley McDonald, Joseph Riccelli, Dallas Stewart	6 1/2 furlongs	1:17.89	$150,000	II	
2001	Finder's Fee	4	John R. Velazquez	Claude R. McGaughey III	Ogden Phipps	6 1/2 furlongs	1:17.60	$129,225	II	
2000	Dream Supreme	3	Pat Day	William I. Mott	Kinsman Stable	6 1/2 furlongs	1:15.96	$107,300	III	
1999	Positive Gal	3	Jerry D. Bailey	D. Wayne Lukas	Robert B. & Beverly J. Lewis	6 1/2 furlongs	1:16.86	$109,700	III	
1998	Catinca	3	Richard Migliore	John C. Kimmel	Robert K. Waxman	6 1/2 furlongs	1:15.60	$84,325	III	
1997	Top Secret	4	John R. Velazquez	George R. Arnold II	John H. Peace	6 1/2 furlongs	1:16.00	$82,100	III	
1996	Miss Golden Circle	4	Richard Migliore	John C. Kimmel	Caesar P. Kimmel	6 1/2 furlongs	1:16.26	$83,400	Listed	
1995	Classy Mirage	5	Jerry D. Bailey	H. Allen Jerkens	Middletown Stables	6 1/2 furlongs	1:17.34	$80,625	Listed	
1994	Vivano	5	Herb McCauley	Howard M. Tesher	Sidney L. Port	6 furlongs	1:10.93	$80,426	Listed	
1993	Race not held									
At Saratoga – Gallant Bloom Stakes
1992	Apelia (CAN)	3	Larry Attard	Phillip England	Steve A. Stavro	6 furlongs	1:08.97	$54,000	Listed	3YO fillies

Notes:
† In 2023, Caramel Swirl originally finished third but was placed first when the top two finishers, Sterling Silver and Headland, were both disqualified for interference.

== See also ==
- List of American and Canadian Graded races
