= Union Turnpike =

Union Turnpike may refer to:

- Union Turnpike (New York)
  - Kew Gardens–Union Turnpike (IND Queens Boulevard Line), subway station
- Union Turnpike (Hudson County, New Jersey)
