= Interborough Stakes =

Interborough Stakes (Previously Interborough Handicap)
- Class: Ungraded stakes
- Location: Aqueduct Racetrack; Queens, New York, United States
- Inaugurated: 1921
- Race type: Thoroughbred - Flat racing
- Website: www.nyra.com

Race information
- Distance: 6 furlong sprint)
- Surface: Dirt
- Track: left-handed
- Qualification: Fillies & Mares, Three-years-old & up
- Weight: Assigned
- Purse: $100,000

The Interborough Stakes, previously Interborough Handicap is an American Thoroughbred horse race held annually at the beginning of January at Aqueduct Racetrack in Ozone Park, Queens, New York. A non-graded stakes race open to fillies & mares age three and older, it is contested on dirt over a distance of six furlongs.

From its inaugural race in 1921 through 1955, the Interborough was open to both males and females. From 1956 on, it became a filly and mare event.

Inaugurated in 1921 at the Jamaica Race Course in Jamaica, Queens, it was raced there through 1958 after which it was hosted by the Aqueduct track. From 1968 through 1970, Belmont Park was home to the race.

From 1921 through 1924, the Interborough Handicap was contested at a distance of a mile and a sixteenth.

Ta Wee won this race in 1969 and 1970. Affectionately won it in 1963 and 1964.

In 2013, Nicole H became the first horse to win this race three times as well as consecutively.

== Past winners ==
- 2019 - Dawn The Destroyer
- 2018 - Divine Miss Grey
- 2017 - Takrees
- 2016 - La Verdad
- 2015 - Willet
- 2014 - Lion D N A
- 2013 - Nicole H
- 2012 - Nicole H
- 2011 - Nicole H
- 2010 - Distorted Passion
- 2009 - Zada Belle
- 2008 - Control System
- 2007 - Oprah Winney
- 2006 - Comacina
- 2005 - Bank Audit
- 2004 - Fit Performer
- 2003 - Wilzada
- 2002 - Xtra Heat
- 2001 - Slash Cottage
- 2000 - Seeking the Sky
- 2000 - Go Again Valid (2nd Division)
- 1999 - Bimini Blues
- 1998 - Evils Pic
- 1997 - You'renotlistening
- 1996 - Traverse City
- 1995 - Lottsa Talc
- 1994 - Poolesta
- 1993 - Win Crafty Lady
- 1992 - Wood So
- 1991 - Feel The Beat
- 1990 - Feel The Beat
- 1989 - Cagey Exuberance
- 1988 - Spring Beauty
- 1987 - Genes Lady
- 1986 - Genes Lady
- 1985 - Am Capable
- 1984 - Mickeys Echo
- 1983 - Jones Time Machine
- 1982 - La Vue
- 1981 - Skipat
- 1980 - Gladiolus
- 1979 - Gladiolus
- 1978 - Tetrarquina
- 1977 - Illiterate
- 1976 - Donetta
- 1975 - Lachesis
- 1974 - Poker Night
- 1973 - Soul Mate
- 1972 - Aglimmer
- 1971 - Process Shot
- 1970 - Ta Wee
- 1969 - Ta Wee
- 1968 - Romanticism
- 1967 - Recall
- 1966 - Native Street
- 1965 - Ballet Rose
- 1964 - Affectionately
- 1963 - Affectionately
- 1962 - Windy Miss
- 1961 - Rose ONeill
- 1960 - Wiggle
- 1959 - Nushie
- 1958 - Mrs. Hellen
- 1957 - Venomous
- 1956 - Happy Princess
- 1955 - Duc De Fer
- 1954 - Laffango
- 1953 - White Skies
- 1952 - Squared Away
- 1951 - Magic Words
- 1950 - Sheilas Reward
- 1949 - Royal Governor
- 1948 - Miss Disco
- 1947 - Tavistock
- 1946 - True North
- 1945 - Greek Warrior
- 1944 - Ariel Lad
- 1943 - Slide Rule
- 1942 - Eire
- 1941 - Speed to Spare
- 1940 - Grey Wolf
- 1939 - Speed to Spare
- 1938 - He Did
- 1937 - Deliberator
- 1936 - Bill Farnsworth
- 1935 - Sation
- 1934 - Miss Merriment (filly)
- 1933 - RACE NOT RUN
- 1932 - Vander Pool
- 1931 - Morstone
- 1930 - Finite
- 1929 - Polydor
- 1928 - Extreme
- 1927 - Circlet (filly)
- 1926 - Sabine (filly)
- 1925 - Worthmore
- 1924 - Big Blaze
- 1923 - Knobbie (3 starters)
- 1922 - Sennings Park
- 1921 - Georgie (2 starters)
