= Ta Wee =

American-bred Thoroughbred racehorse

- Sire: Intentionally
- Grandsire: Intent
- Dam: Aspidistra
- Damsire: Better Self
- Sex: Filly
- Foaled: 1966
- Country: USA (Florida)
- Colour: Dark Bay
- Breeder: Tartan Farms
- Owner: Tartan Stable
- Trainer: John A. Nerud and Scotty Schulhofer
- Record: 21 Starts: 15-2-1
- Earnings: $284,941

Major wins
- Jasmine Stakes (1969); Vosburgh Stakes (1969); Miss Woodford Stakes (1969); Fall Highweight Handicap (1969 & 1970); Prioress Stakes (1969); Comely Stakes (1969); Test Stakes (1969); Interborough Handicap (1969 & 1970); Correction Handicap (1970); Hempstead Handicap (1970); Monmouth Regret Stakes (1970)

Awards
- American Champion Sprint Horse (1969 & 1970)

Honours
- U.S. Racing Hall of Fame (1994) #80 - Top 100 U.S. Racehorses of the 20th Century
- Last updated on December 12, 2007

Ta Wee (1966–1980) was an American Thoroughbred Hall of Fame race horse.

== Background ==
Ta Wee was bred at the Tartan Stable of William L. McKnight (chairman of the board of Minnesota Mining and Manufacturing Co.). (The W. L. McKnight Handicap is raced in his honor at Calder Race Course.) Foaled on March 26, 1966, she was sired by Intentionally, the American Champion Sprint Horse of 1959. Man o' War appears on both sides of Ta Wee's pedigree, but Ta Wee's dam was the great broodmare Aspidistra by Better Self by Bimelech by Black Toney. Aspidistra also goes back to the influential Ben Brush.

A birthday gift in 1957 to McKnight by his employees, Aspidistra cost a reputed $6,500 and was entered in claiming races. No one claimed her, and at the time she retired, McKnight still owned her. Two years prior to the birth of Ta Wee, the mare gave birth to Dr. Fager. Aside from Dr. Fager and Ta Wee, Aspidistra is the tail-female ancestress of Unbridled. The name Ta Wee comes from the Sioux language and means "Beautiful Girl."

Ta Wee's initial trainer was Hall of Famer John A. Nerud. In the Fall of 1969, she was trained by Scotty Schulhofer.

== Racing career ==
Her introduction to racing at the age of two proved a modest success, but in her first year as a three-year-old sprinter, she won eight stakes races, five of them consecutively. In the Vosburgh Stakes she beat older males.

Because of her triumphs in her third year, her fourth year saw her heavily weighted. Even so, she won five of her seven races. In her last two races, her second Fall Highweight Handicap and her second Interborough Handicap, she ran under 140 and 142 pounds, giving away 19 pounds to the runner up in the Fall Highweight and 29 pounds in the Interborough. For this she won her second consecutive American Champion Sprint Horse award.

== Breeding record ==
Retired to broodmare duties, Ta Wee had five foals, all of them winners, and four stakes winners. Her first foal was the sprint stakes winner, Great Above, who sired Holy Bull. Ta Wee died in 1980.

== See also ==
- List of racehorses
