= Union Avenue Stakes =

- Class: Ungraded
- Location: Saratoga Race Course in Saratoga Springs, New York
- Inaugurated: 2004
- Race type: Thoroughbred

Race information
- Distance: 6 furlongs
- Surface: dirt
- Track: Left-handed
- Qualification: 3-year-old
- Purse: $125,000 (2022)

The Union Avenue is an American ungraded Thoroughbred horse race run annually at Saratoga Race Course. The race is restricted to fillies and mares 3-years-old and up who were bred in the State of New York. It is raced at a current (2014) distance of six and one half furlongs on the dirt and offers a purse of $100,000 added.

The Union Avenue, inaugurated in 2004, is named for the famed street in Saratoga Springs, New York where the track is located.

== Records ==
Most wins by a jockey:

- 3 – Edgar Prado (2004, 2006, 2008)
- 3 – Javier Castellano (2009, 2012, 2023)

Most wins by an trainer:

- 3 – Linda Rice (2014, 2016, 2020)

Most wins by an owner:

- No owner has won this race more than once

== Winners of the Union Avenue Stakes ==
Year	Winner	Jockey	Trainer	Owner	Time
2024	Tricky Temper	Flavien Prat	Jeremiah C. Englehart	Mark H. Stanley	1:10.19
2023	Grannys Connection	Javier Castellano	Thomas Morley	Orpen Horses LLC, Alan Griffen, Jack Hardin & Towell Jr.	1:11.09
2022	Bank On Anna	Jose Lezcano	Philip M. Serpe	WellSpring Stables	1:12.32
2021	Awesome Debate	Luis Saez	Bruce R. Brown	NRB Racing Stable & Van Vranken Racing	1:17.48
2020	Newly Minted	Jose Lezcano	Linda Rice	Beach Heaven Thoroughbreds	1:23.84
2019	Carrera Cat	Rajiv Maragh	John Morrison	Stone Bridge Farm & Very Un Stable	1:14.93
2018	Bonita Bianca	Manuel Franco	Jason Servis	Michael Dubb, Bethlehem Stables, & Michael Imperio	1:15.39
2017	Picco Uno	Irad Ortiz Jr.	Jason Servis	Kennesaw Mountain Racing	1:16.57
2016	Hot City Girl	José Ortiz	Linda Rice	Lady Sheila Stable	1:15.03
2015	Tricky Zippy	John R. Velazquez	James A. Jerkens	Newman Racing	1:15.78
2014	Uncle Southern	Luis Saez	Linda Rice	J and M Racing Stables	1:17.46
2013	Willet	Joel Rosario	James Iselin	James H. Iselin, Charlotte Assoulin, David Assoulin, & Eli Gindi	1:11.36
2012	Risky Rachel	Javier Castellano	Juan M. Coronel	Sanford Bacon	1:09.02
2011	Lovely Lil	Ramon A. Dominguez	Michael E. Hushion	Barry K. Schwartz	1:10.59
2010	Meese Rocks	Jorge F. Chavez	Edward R. Barker	Joseph Terranova, Jamie Terranova, & Henry Terranova	1:11.46
2009	Silvercup Baby	Javier Castellano	Carl Domino	Eric Brophy	1:10.28
2008	By The Light	Edgar Prado	Rick Dutrow	Jay Em Ess Stable	1:10.58
2007	Karakorum Starlet	Kent Desormeaux	Jeff Odintz	Karakorum Farm	1:10.95
2006	Gold Like U	Edgar Prado	Richard E. Dutrow Jr.	Vincent S. Scuderi & Sullivan Lane Stable	1:10.04
2005	Lapis	Cornelio Velásquez	John O. Hertler	Carolyn Wilson	1:11.40
2004	Sugar Punch	Edgar Prado	Richard E. Dutrow Jr.	IEAH Stables, Joe Torre, Robert Speranza & Robert A. Petronella	1:09.81
