= White hot =

American hot dog

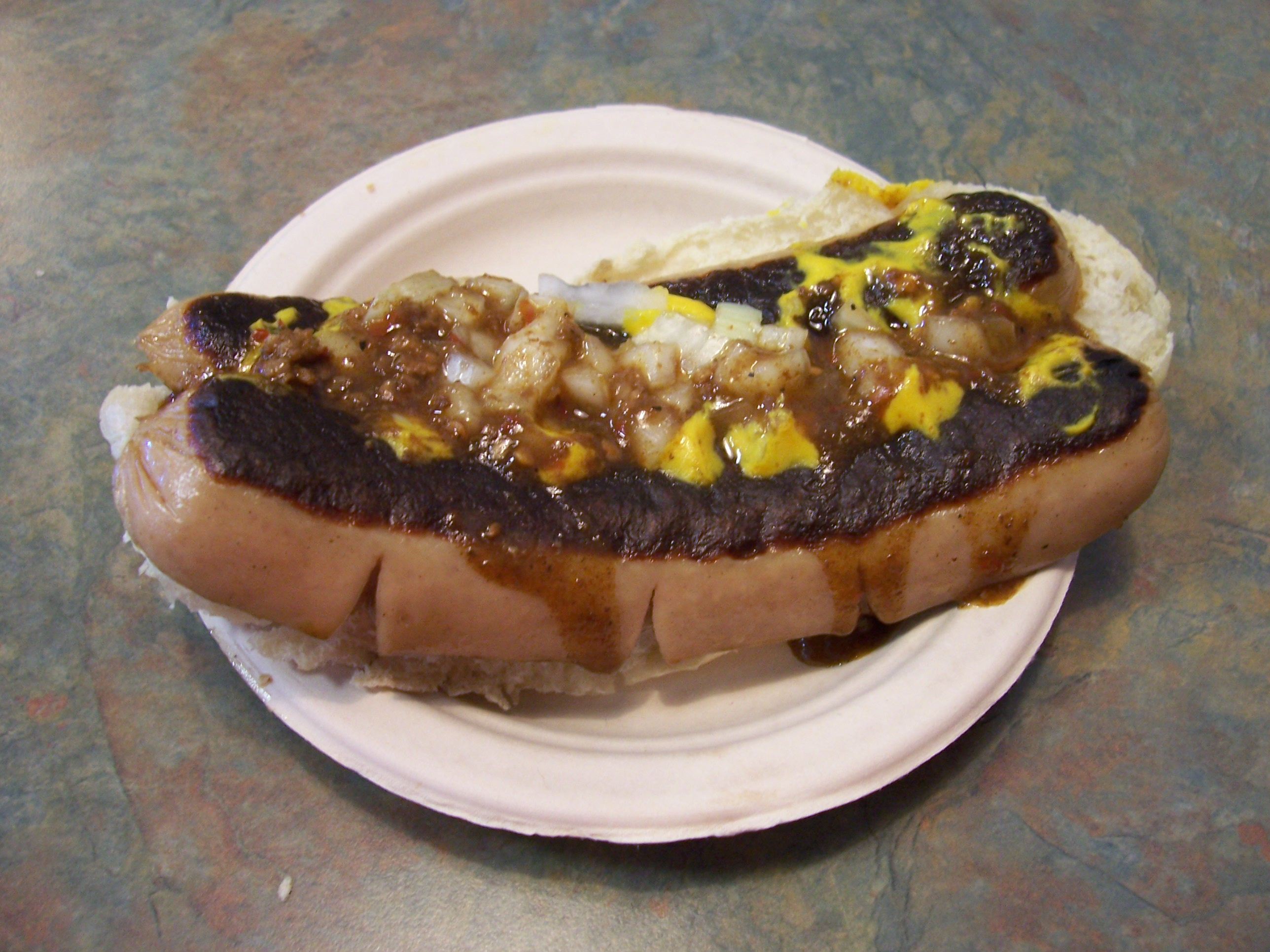
- A Zweigle's 1/4 pound white hot at Bill Gray's
- Course: Main course
- Place of origin: Rochester, New York
- Region or state: Western New York, Central New York
- Serving temperature: Hot
- Main ingredients: Pork, white bun, optional condiments (mustard, hot sauce, onions, and others)

The white hot is a variation on the hot dog found primarily in the Rochester, New York area, as well as other parts of Western New York and Central New York. It is composed of a combination of uncured and unsmoked pork, beef, and veal; the lack of smoking or curing allows the meat to retain a naturally white color. White hots usually contain mustard and other spices, and often include a dairy component such as nonfat dry milk.

== History ==
The white hot was created by Max Russer in the 1920s in Rochester's German community as a "white and porky". He owned a meat store on Maple and Ames Streets in Rochester. Originally a cheaper alternative to high-price red hot dogs, they were first made of the less desirable meat parts and various fillers. In contrast, modern versions are made from quality meats and generally carry higher prices than common hot dogs.

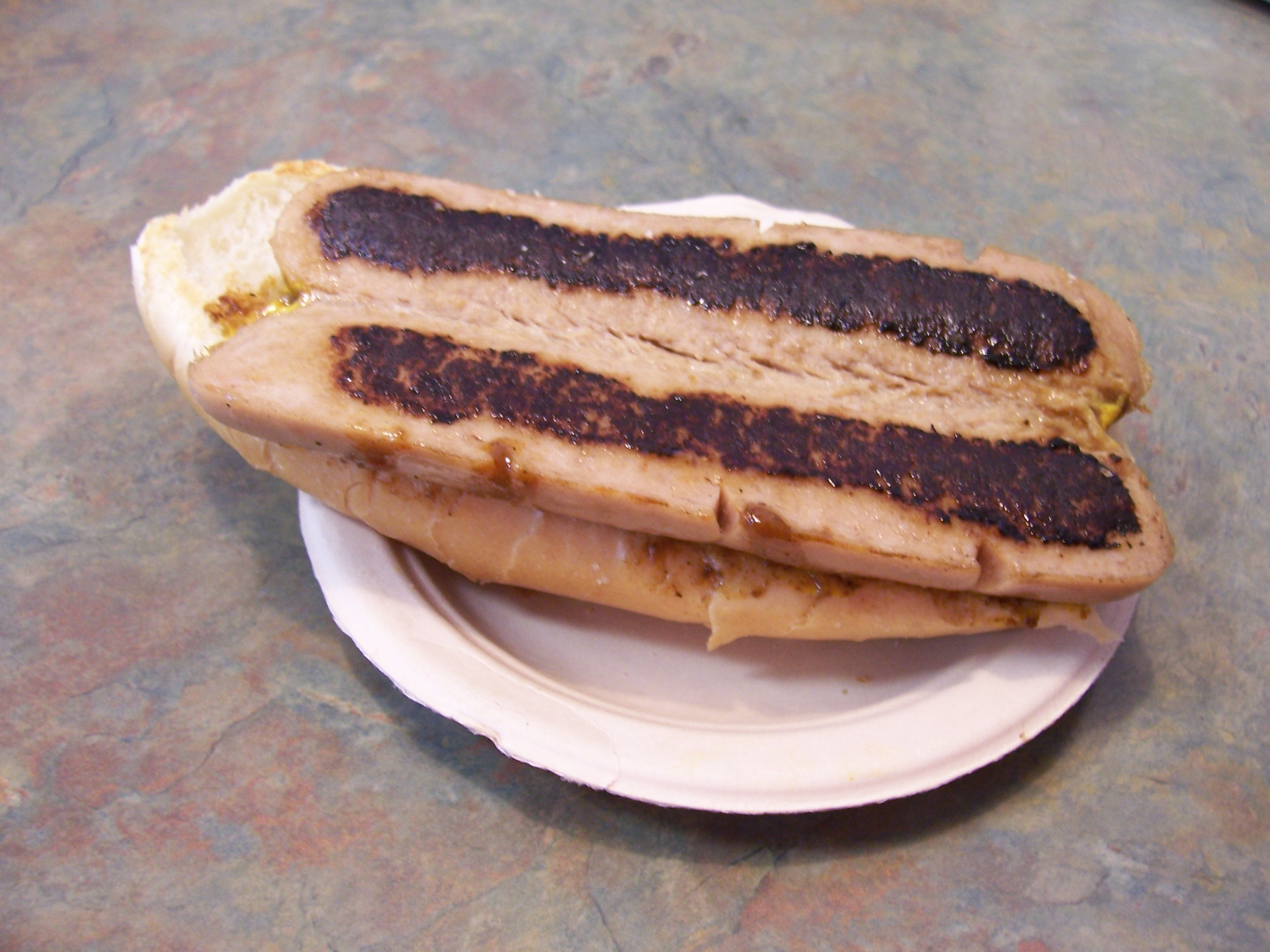
Detail of a white hot's interior with prominent sear marks

One of the best-known producers of the white hot is Zweigle's. Although it was not the first to make white hots, it was the first to secure a contract at the Red Wing Stadium soon after Zweigle's began making the dogs in 1925. The white hot is the official hot dog of the Buffalo Sabres, Rochester Americans and Rochester Rhinos and was the official hot dog of the Washington Nationals during the major league baseball team's first season.

Another producer, Hofmann, produces white hots in the Syracuse, New York area under the name "Snappy Grillers". A third company, Hartmann, is also known to produce white hots.

== See also ==
- Weisswurst, an unrelated white German sausage made primarily from veal, traditional in Bavaria and popular in the mid-western United States
- Hot dog variations
- List of hot dogs
- List of regional dishes of the United States
