= Slide Rule (horse) =

American Thoroughbred racehorse

- Sire: Snark
- Grandsire: Boojum
- Dam: King's Idyll
- Damsire: Sir Gallahad III
- Sex: Stallion
- Foaled: 1940
- Country: United States
- Colour: Dark Chestnut
- Breeder: Arthur B. Hancock
- Owner: William E. Boeing
- Trainer: Cecil Wilhelm
- Record: 29: 10-6-2
- Earnings: US$133,760

Major wins
- Babylon Handicap (1942); Cowdin Stakes (1942); Arlington Classic (1943); Interborough Handicap (1943); Jerome Handicap (1943); Peter Pan Handicap (1943); Swift Stakes (1943); Westchester Handicap (1943); Experimental Free Handicap (1943)

Slide Rule (1940 – ? ) was a Thoroughbred race horse who was owned by William E. Boeing of Boeing. He sired by Metropolitan and Suburban Handicap winner, Snark and was out of the mare King's Idyll, a daughter of the outstanding Champion sire and broodmare sire, Sir Gallahad III.

He was a stablemate of the more noted Devil's Thumb, and in April 1943, of the colt Twoses. Newspaper reports of the early 1940s described him as a little chestnut colt.

== Competition chronicle ==
Slide Rule's first victory of significance came in the Babylon Handicap at Aqueduct Race Track on September 5, 1942. The colt emerged from the middle of the pack to take the $7,325 purse. He won a Kentucky Derby trial, the Experimental Handicap, at Jamaica, New York, on April 8, 1943. The field of fifteen included thirteen Derby eligibles.

On June 4, 1942, Slide Rule was part of an owner - trainer - jockey double for W.E. Boeing, Cecil Wilhelm, and Ralph Neves at Belmont Park. Larrup, the other Boeing entry, won the first event with Slide Rule completing the double.

Slide Rule, along with Corona, Corona, another Boeing thoroughbred, entered the $62,000 Arlington Futurity in Chicago, Illinois, on July 18, 1942. The event was won by Occupation, with Corona, Corona finishing fifth and Slide Rule 7th.

In the Wood Memorial Stakes at Aqueduct Race Track on April 17, 1943, Slide Rule was injured, slowed to a walking gait, and finished fifth.

Cecil Wilhelm, Slide Rule's trainer, shipped the thoroughbred to Churchill Downs on April 22, 1943. Ocean Wave finished nine lengths ahead of Slide Rule, who placed second, in the Kentucky Derby Trial on April 27, 1943.

== Winner's circle in New York ==
After finishing third to Kentucky Derby winner, Count Fleet, Wilhelm decided to hold the colt out of the Preakness Stakes. Slide Rule ran the mile at 1:41 1/5 at Belmont Park. However, the trainer opted to run him instead in the Withers Stakes at Aqueduct Race Track. As a 2 to 5 favorite in the $9,650 Peter Pan Handicap, Slide Rule won by "an inch" over Vincentive with a last second lunge. The victory secured the $7,025 winner's share for W.E. Boeing. Conn McCreary was the winning jockey on Slide Rule. The winning time was 1:51 1/5.

== Chicago success ==
A camera decision was necessary to decide that Occupation had defeated Slide Rule by a head at Washington Park Race Track on June 25, 1943. In his second start of the 1943 season, Occupation won the seven furlong event and its purse of $2,500.

In the $72,000 Arlington Classic at Arlington Park, Slide Rule captured a $53,400 victory as a 5 to 1 shot. He came in a length ahead of Bourmont, despite having lost in three previous races at the Chicago, Illinois race track. It was the colt's most important victory, coming after a runner-up to Count Fleet in the Withers Stakes and two stakes wins at Belmont Park.
