= Abbott's Frozen Custard =

Frozen Custard franchise

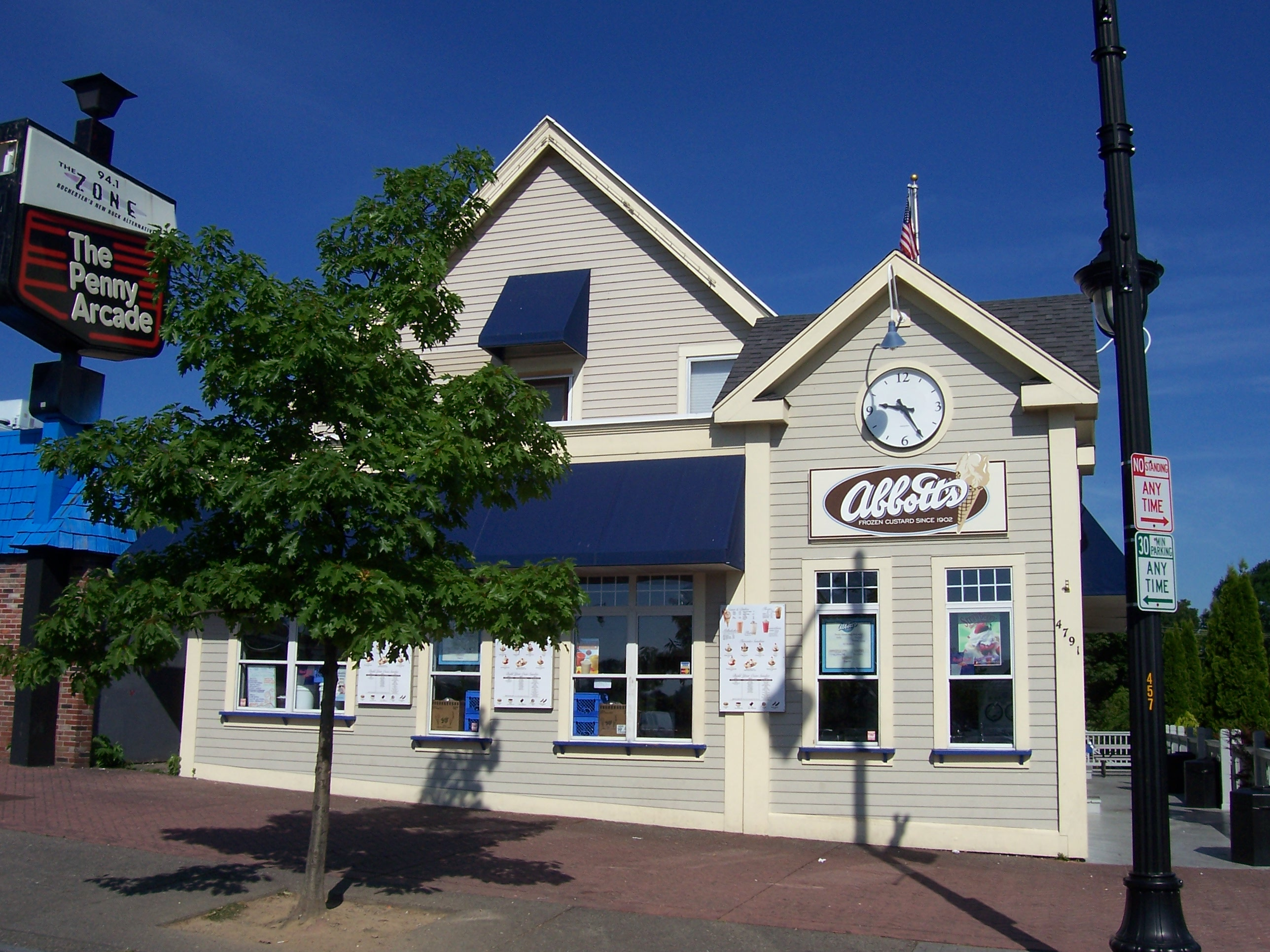
- Abbott's headquarters and shop at the northern end of Lake Avenue in Rochester
- Type: Private
- Industry: Restaurants; Dessert
- Genre: Quick Service
- Founded: 1902; 124 years ago
- Founder: Arthur W. Abbott
- Headquarters: Rochester, New York, U.S .
- Number of locations: 46 (2024)
- Key people: Gail Drew (President)
- Products: Frozen Custard; Frozen Treats
- Website: www.abbottscustard.com

Abbott's Frozen Custard is a frozen custard franchise founded and based in Rochester, New York. The franchise has stores throughout New York state, and has expanded to other states including Florida, Louisiana, Massachusetts, North Carolina, South Carolina, and Virginia.

== Overview ==
Abbott's Frozen Custard was founded in 1902 by Arthur Abbott, who would travel with small carnivals along the eastern seaboard. In 1926, he settled in Rochester. He opened up shop at the corner of Lake and Beach Avenues, across the street from Ontario Beach Park, which at the time was an amusement park that drew crowds of people from all over the state.

Abbott next opened up several shops in the Playland at Rye Beach. The revenue from the stores allowed him to support his interest in horse racing, and in 1952 his horse Blue Man won the Preakness Stakes, earning him $86,135.

In 1957, Abbott was in his 70s and decided to sell the business to Leonard and Thelma Schreiber, they became the new owners of Abbott's Frozen Custard and started franchising Abbott's locations. The first franchise was opened on Ridge Road in Rochester in 1977. Other franchises would follow, along with other additions that contributed to the business. In 1981, Thelma Schreiber unveiled the "Turtle" dessert, a novelty item of chocolate-covered custard on a stick. In 2006 the Krispy Kreme doughnut chain added Abbott's custard to its product line at some stores in south Florida. A Japanese operator opened Abbott's outlets in Japan starting in 1999. Gail Drew, the daughter of Leonard and Thelma Schreiber, is the current company president.

== See also ==
- List of frozen custard companies
