= Zweigle's =

American food manufacturer

Zweigle's, Inc.
- Type: Private
- Industry: Food Processing
- Founded: Rochester, New York, United States (1880; 146 years ago)
- Founder: C. Wilhelm Zweigle
- Headquarters: Rochester, New York, United States
- Products: Hot dogs, sausages and deli items
- Owner: Julie Camardo
- Number of employees: 50
- Website: www.zweigles.com

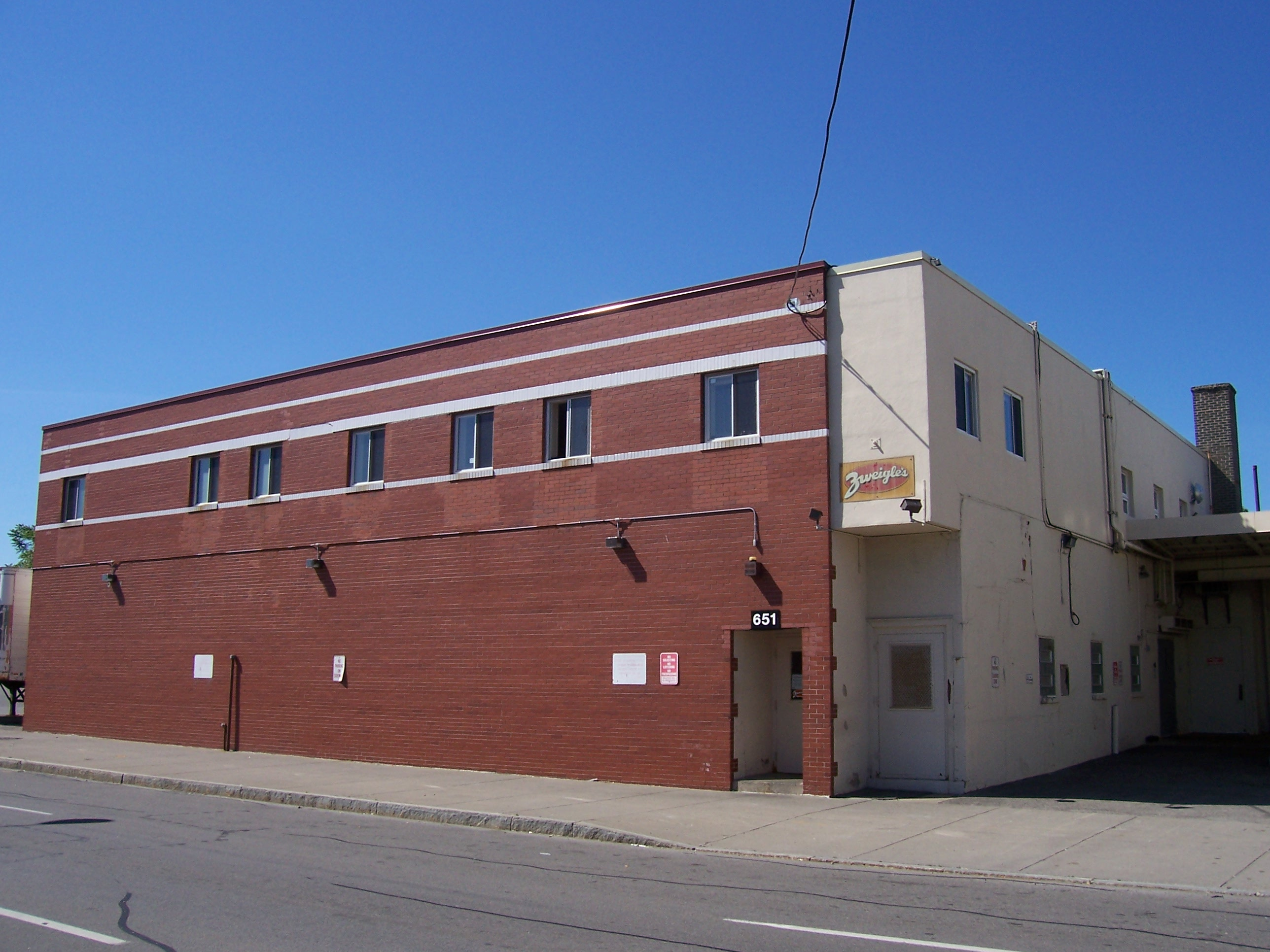
Zweigle's headquarters in Rochester, New York

Zweigles, Inc. is a food manufacturer of hot dogs, sausages, and deli products. The company is based in Rochester, New York, and was founded in 1880 by C. Wilhelm Zweigle, a German immigrant to the United States. It is well known for its brand of white hots, which are descended from German white sausages. The company expanded across New York in the 20th and 21st centuries because of partnerships with Wegmans supermarkets and several sports teams, beginning with the Rochester Red Wings in the 1930s.
