= Jonathan C. Jones =

Barbadian jockey (born 1976)

Jono Jones
Personal information
- Born: April 30, 1976 (age 50) Cascade, Trinidad and Tobago
- Occupation: Horse jockey

Horse racing career
- Sport: Horse racing
- Career wins: Ongoing

Major racing wins
- Barbados Derby (1991, 1992, 1994, 1996, 2000); Barbados Derby Trial Stakes (1996); Barbados Gold Cup (2000, 2001, 2002, 2003); Dance Smartly Stakes (2001); Kennedyi Road Stakes (2003); Princess Elizabeth Stakes (2003); Swynford Stakes (2003); Ontario Derby (2004); Plate Trial Stakes (2004, 2008); Dominion Day Stakes (2005); Nijinsky Stakes (2005); Saranac Stakes (2005); Sky Classic Stakes (2005); Cup and Saucer Stakes (2006, 2007); Ontario Colleen Stakes (2006, 2008); Singspiel Stakes (2006, 2007); Canadian Stakes (2007); Natalma Stakes (2007); Victoria Stakes (2008); Queenston Stakes (2008) Canadian Classic Race wins: Prince of Wales Stakes (2004); Breeders' Stakes (2004, 2005); Queen's Plate (2008)

Significant horses
- Blast of Storm, A Bit O'Gold, Jambalaya; Leonnatus Anteas, Not Bourbon

Jonathon C. "Jono" Jones (born April 30, 1976 in Cascade, Trinidad and Tobago) is a Barbadian-born Canadian jockey in Thoroughbred horse racing who has won each of the Canadian Triple Crown races.

The son of the renowned Barbadian jockey/trainer Challenor Jones MBE, Jono Jones began his riding career at the age of fourteen at Garrison Savannah Racetrack in his native Barbados. In addition to winning important races at home, including five runnings of the Barbados Derby, he was also the leading rider in Martinique in 1994 and again in 1995.

In May 2001, Jono Jones went to compete in Toronto, Ontario, Canada. While riding in both Canada and in Barbados, between 2000 and 2003 he won four straight editions of the Barbados Gold Cup, his country's most prestigious race.

In Canada, Jones has won a number of important stakes races at Woodbine Racetrack and at Fort Erie Racetrack. Riding for trainer/owner Catherine Day Phillips, in 2004 he rode A Bit O'Gold to victory in two of the three Canadian Triple Crown Races, the Prince of Wales Stakes and the Breeders' Stakes. The following year he won his second Breeders' Stakes aboard Phillips's Jambalaya. Yet again, Jones won the Breeders' Stakes in 2009, riding Perfect Shower to victory. The win made Perfect Shower the longest price winner in history to win the Breeders' Stakes.

In 2008, Jones rode Not Bourbon to victory in Canada's most prestigious race, the Queen's Plate.

== Year-end charts ==
Chart (2002–present)	Peak position
National Earnings List for Jockeys 2002	91
National Earnings List for Jockeys 2003	39
National Earnings List for Jockeys 2004	32
National Earnings List for Jockeys 2005	80
National Earnings List for Jockeys 2006	81
National Earnings List for Jockeys 2007	69
National Earnings List for Jockeys 2008	41
National Earnings List for Jockeys 2010	55
