= William C. Marshall =

British racehorse trainer (1918–2005)

Personal information
- Born: 14 August 1918 Newcastle upon Tyne, England
- Died: 31 October 2005 (aged 87), Barbados
- Occupation: Trainer

Horse racing career
- Sport: Horse racing
- Career wins: 648 (Barbados)

Major racing wins
- Barbados Gold Cup (1984, 1994, 1995, 2000, 2001, 2002, 2003); Midsummer Creole Classic (1985, 1987, 1989, 1990, 1991, 1993, 1997, 2005); Barbados Derby (1985, 1987, 1989, 1990, 1993, 1997, 2000, 2002, 2004)

Racing awards
- Barbados Champion Trainer (11 times)

Honours
- Silver Crown of Merit (2003); W. C. Marshall Creole Classic at Garrison Savannah

Significant horses
- Coo Bird, Blast of Storm

William Cyril Marshall DFC SCM (14 August 1918 – 31 October 2005) was a Thoroughbred horse racing trainer and owner who had the distinction of being the only person to have saddled winners from stables on four different continents.

Born in Newcastle upon Tyne, Bill Marshall was raised on a farm near Chichester where he developed his love of horses. In his early teens, he left home and made his way to Australia where he worked as a jockey for a short time before turning to training. While still only seventeen years old he headed to South Africa where he operated his own stable for a few years until the outbreak of World War II. Marshall returned to his native England and joined the Royal Air Force. In the war, Marshall, while flying back from a mission over France, realised that he was going to be very late for a date in Buckinghamshire. He was supposed to land at Tangmere, in Sussex, but diverted to Marlow, where his date awaited him in the Compleat Angler Inn. His daredevil act of flying his Spitfire under Marlow Bridge (headway Marlow Bridge = 3.86 metres, Spitfire height = 3.86 metres) and performing a roll impressed his girlfriend, but not an air commodore who happened to be in the bar. A report was filed, but Marshall escaped a court martial because it was wartime. As a pilot, he fought in the Battle of Britain thence served with 253 squadron in North Africa before returning to England to serve in the famous 91 'Nigeria' Squadron. By the time the war ended, Marshall had been shot down twice and was the recipient of the Distinguished Flying Cross as well as mentioned in dispatches. Discharged from the military, Marshall remained in England and began training National Hunt horses then Thoroughbreds for flat racing.

In 1972 a small plane carrying Marshall and his wife Pamela, along with jockey Joe Mercer and racehorse-owner John Howard, crashed after taking off from Newbury Racecourse. The pilot died in the crash but although they were seriously injured, Marshall and his wife and the other passengers survived.

In 1981, the sixty-three-old Marshall and his wife Pamela moved to Barbados where he would become one of the most important figures in that country's horse racing industry. Among his successes at Garrison Savannah Racetrack, Bill Marshall was a seven-time winner of the island's most prestigious race, the Barbados Gold Cup and a nine-time winner of the Barbados Derby. In 1989 he conditioned Barbados Triple Crown champion, Coo Bird, who would win more races in his career than any other Thoroughbred in Barbados horse racing history. In all, Marshall won twenty-two Barbadian Triple Crown races and earned champion trainer honors eleven times.

In 1994 "The Art and Science of Racehorse Training: the "Bill" Marshall Guide" by Michael W. Marshall was published by Keepdate Publishing, with an introduction by Jack Berry. In 2003, Bill Marshall's biography titled You Win Some, You Lose Some was published. That same year, the government of Barbados honored his contribution to horse racing with the Silver Crown of Merit.

Bill Marshall remained active in racing and was still winning at the time of his death in 2005 at the age of eighty-seven.
