= Jambalaya (disambiguation) =

Jambalaya is a Louisiana origin dish of Spanish and French influence, consisting mainly of meat and vegetables mixed with rice.

Jambalaya may also refer to:

- "Jambalaya (On the Bayou)", 1952 song by Hank Williams
- Jambalaya (horse) (foaled 2002), Canadian racehorse
- Jambalaya Island, fictional island in Monkey Island series
- Jambalaya Studios, founded by Bruce W. Smith
- June Jambalaya, American drag queen
