= Take Charge Indy =

American Thoroughbred racehorse

- Sire: A.P. Indy
- Grandsire: Seattle Slew
- Dam: Take Charge Lady
- Damsire: Dehere
- Sex: Stallion
- Foaled: 27 March 2009
- Country: United States
- Colour: Bay or Brown
- Breeder: Eaton Sales
- Owner: Chuck & Maribeth Sandford; Winstar Farm
- Trainer: Patrick B. Byrne
- Record: 14:3-4-2
- Earnings: $1,103,496

Major wins
- Florida Derby (2012); Alysheba Stakes (2013)

Take Charge Indy (foaled 27 March 2009) is an American Thoroughbred racehorse. His win in the 2012 Florida Derby saw him regarded as a contender for the Triple Crown races, but an injury sustained in the Kentucky Derby ruled him out for most of the remainder of the season. As a four-year-old in 2013 he won the Alysheba Stakes but later that summer suffered a condylar fracture in the Monmouth Cup, which required surgery, but ended his racing career and his owners, WinStar Farm, retired him to stud.

== Background ==
Take Charge Indy is a dark bay or brown horse with a white star bred by Eaton Sales of Lexington, Kentucky. His sire A.P. Indy won the Belmont Stakes and the Breeders' Cup Classic in 1992 before going on to become a successful breeding stallion: his other progeny include Bernardini, Friesan Fire, Mineshaft, Pulpit and Rags to Riches. Take Charge Indy's dam, Take Charge Lady, was a top-class racemare whose wins included the Ashland Stakes and successive runnings of the Spinster Stakes. She is also the dam of the Travers Stakes winner Will Take Charge.

As a yearling, Take Charge Indy was consigned to the Keeneland Sales in September, but failed to find a buyer willing to pay the $80,000 reserve price. The colt was sent into training with the British-born Patrick Byrne, whose other successful horses have included Awesome Again and Favorite Trick. Take Charge Indy usually races in a set of black blinkers.

== Racing career ==
=== 2011: two-year-old season ===
Throughout his two-year-old season, which began on 30 July 2011, Take Charge Indy was ridden by James Graham. On his debut, the colt recorded a six and a half length win a maiden race on the Polytrack surface at Arlington Park. At the same track on September 10, he was moved up in class to contest the Grade III Arlington-Washington Futurity and was made the 12/5 favorite against twelve opponents. He took the lead in the straight but was overtaken 75 yards from the finish and beaten a length by Shared Property. In October, Take Charge Indy competed at Grade I level for the first time in the Dixiana Breeders' Futurity at Keeneland and finished fourth of the thirteen runners behind Dullahan. On his final appearance of the year, Take Charge Indy started a 33/1 outsider in the Breeders' Cup Juvenile at Churchill Downs on November 5. He finished fifth of the thirteen runners behind Hansen, Union Rags, Creative Cause and Dullahan.

=== 2012: three-year-old season ===
In 2012, Calvin Borel took over from Graham as Take Charge Indy's regular jockey. The colt began his season at Gulfstream Park in January, when he finished second to El Padrino in an allowance race over one and one sixteenth of a mile. The colt did not race again for months, with Byrne controversially withdrawing his charge from the Tampa Bay Derby after receiving an unfavorable outside draw. Take Charge Indy reappeared in the Grade I Florida Derby at Gulfstream and started at odds of 7.7/1 for a race in which his rivals included Union Rags (the 2/5 favorite) and El Padrino. Borel sent the colt into the lead after 150 yards and led the field until being headed by Reveron with a quarter mile to run. Take Charge Indy quickly regained the lead, broke two lengths clear, and held on to win by a length from Reveron, with Union Rags in third. After the race Borel expressed his confidence in the winner, saying: "This horse, he has the potential, he has the breeding behind him. Pat's been to the big dance, so he wasn’t coming to play, I’ll tell you that."

On May 5, 2012, Take Charge Indy was one of twenty colts to contest the 138th Kentucky Derby over a mile and a quarter at Churchill Downs. Starting from stall 3 he was made the 11.9/1 fourth choice in the betting behind Bodemeister, Union Rags and Gemologist. He raced just behind the leaders but began to weaken before the stretch and finished tailed off last of the nineteen finishers, more than fifty lengths behind the winner I'll Have Another. Borel at first believed that the colt had bled during the race, but subsequent veterinary examination revealed that he had chipped a bone in his left front ankle. He underwent surgery at Woodford Equine Hospital in Versailles, Kentucky and was forced to miss most of the season's remaining major races.

During his break from racing a half-share in Take Charge Indy was bought by the Versailles-base Winstar Farm.

After five and a half months off the track, Take Charge Indy returned to action on October 27 in the Grade II Fayette Stakes over a mile and one eighth at Keeneland, where he was matched against older horses for the first time. He finished third of the ten runners behind the four-year-old colt Newsdad and the five-year-old gelding Nikki's Sandcastle. On his final start of the year, Take Charge Indy started at odds of 5.8/1 for the Clark Handicap at Churchill Downs on November 23. Under a weight of 117 pounds he finished second, beaten a length by the 2011 Preakness Stakes winner Shackleford (119).

=== 2013: four-year-old season ===
Take Charge Indy began his third season in the Grade I Donn Handicap at Gulfstream on February 9, 2013, when he finished third, beaten eight lengths by the Graydar, who led from the start. In March, at the same track, he finished second to Cigar Street in the Grade III Skip Away Stakes over ten and a half furlongs.

Take Charge Indy had gone over a year since his last win when he contested the Grade II Alysheba Stakes at Churchill Downs on May 3. Ridden by Rosie Napravnik he carried 120 pounds and started at odds of 14/5 against eight opponents. He won easily by six lengths in a time of 1:41.41 from the subsequently disqualified favorite Cyber Secret, with Hymn Book in third. After the race Byrne said: "We finally got a nice big race out of him... he has that natural speed. He'll wait and do whatever you want". On June 16, Take Charge Indy was made favorite for the Stephen Foster Handicap but after racing in second place he faded in the closing stages and finished last of the six runners behind Fort Larned.

On July 28, in the Grade II Monmouth Cup, at Monmouth Park Racetrack, Take Charge Indy was the favorite and led down the backstretch. However, his jockey heard a "big pop" and quickly pulled him up. The horse was vanned off the track and x-rays showed he had a left front condylar fracture and would require surgical repair. Following a successful operation at the Hogan Equine clinic, where three screws were inserted into the horse's leg, it was announced that Take Charge Indy had been retired and would begin stallion duties at WinStar in 2014.

== Pedigree ==
Pedigree of Take Charge Indy (USA), bay or brown, 2009
Sire A.P. Indy (USA) 1989	Seattle Slew (USA); 1974	Bold Reasoning	Boldnesian
Sire A.P. Indy (USA) 1989	Seattle Slew (USA); 1974	Bold Reasoning	Reason To Earn
Sire A.P. Indy (USA) 1989	Seattle Slew (USA); 1974	My Charmer	Poker
Sire A.P. Indy (USA) 1989	Seattle Slew (USA); 1974	My Charmer	Fair Charmer
Sire A.P. Indy (USA) 1989	Weekend Surprise (USA); 1980	Secretariat	Bold Ruler
Sire A.P. Indy (USA) 1989	Weekend Surprise (USA); 1980	Secretariat	Somethingroyal
Sire A.P. Indy (USA) 1989	Weekend Surprise (USA); 1980	Lassie Dear	Buckpasser
Sire A.P. Indy (USA) 1989	Weekend Surprise (USA); 1980	Lassie Dear	Gay Missile
Dam Take Charge Lady (USA) 1999	Dehere (USA); 1991	Deputy Minister	Vice Regent
Dam Take Charge Lady (USA) 1999	Dehere (USA); 1991	Deputy Minister	Mint Copy
Dam Take Charge Lady (USA) 1999	Dehere (USA); 1991	Sister Dot	Secretariat
Dam Take Charge Lady (USA) 1999	Dehere (USA); 1991	Sister Dot	Sword Game
Dam Take Charge Lady (USA) 1999	Felicita (USA); 1994	Rubiano	Fappiano
Dam Take Charge Lady (USA) 1999	Felicita (USA); 1994	Rubiano	Ruby Slippers
Dam Take Charge Lady (USA) 1999	Felicita (USA); 1994	Grand Bonheur	Blushing Groom
Dam Take Charge Lady (USA) 1999	Felicita (USA); 1994	Grand Bonheur	Director (Family 22-c)

- Take Charge Indy is inbred 3 × 4 to Secretariat, meaning that this stallion appears in both the third and fourth generations of his pedigree.
