= Forever Unbridled =

American-bred Thoroughbred racehorse

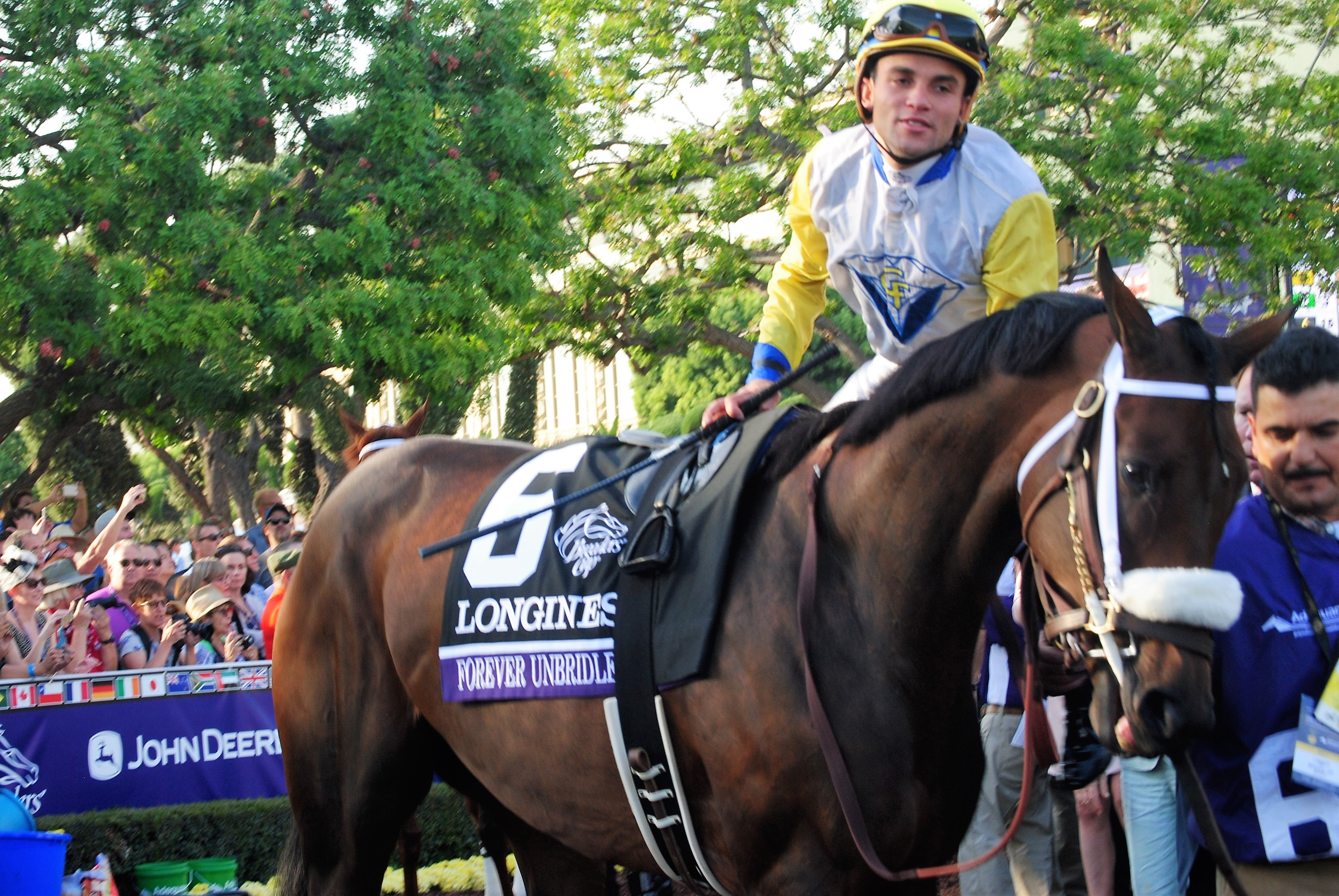
- Forever Unbridled before the 2016 Breeders' Cup Distaff
- Sire: Unbridled's Song
- Grandsire: Unbridled
- Dam: Lemons Forever
- Damsire: Lemon Drop Kid
- Sex: Mare
- Foaled: April 24, 2012
- Country: United States
- Colour: Bay
- Breeder: Charles Fipke
- Owner: Charles Fipke
- Trainer: Dallas Stewart
- Record: 18: 8-3-4
- Earnings: $3,486,880

Major wins
- Comely Stakes (2015); Houston Ladies Classic Stakes (2016); Apple Blossom Handicap (2016); Beldame Stakes (2016); Fleur de Lis Handicap (2017); Personal Ensign Stakes (2017) Breeders' Cup wins: Breeders' Cup Distaff (2017)

Awards
- American Champion Older Dirt Female Horse (2017)
- Last updated on November 20, 2018

Forever Unbridled (foaled April 24, 2012) is a retired American Thoroughbred racehorse who was named the Champion Older Mare of 2017 after winning the Fleur de Lis Handicap, Personal Ensign Stakes and Breeders' Cup Distaff. She also won two Group I stakes races in 2016 before finishing third in that year's Distaff.

== Background ==
Forever Unbridled was bred in Kentucky by Charles Fipke, a Canadian geologist and diamond prospector. She was sired by Unbridled's Song, who won the Breeders' Cup Juvenile and Florida Derby but had his career cut short by soundness issues. Unbridled's Song became a successful breeding stallion known for transmitting speed, but his offspring sometimes lacked durability. His leading offspring include Arrogate, Liam's Map, Unrivaled Belle and Will Take Charge.

Fipke purchased Forever Unbridled's dam, Lemons Forever, as a broodmare prospect for $2.5 million after she won the 2006 Kentucky Oaks. Fipke bred Lemons Forever to Unbridled's Song in back-to-back years, producing Unbridled Forever in 2011 and Forever Unbridled in 2012, both of whom became multiple graded stakes winners.

Forever Unbridled raced as a homebred for Fipke. She was trained by Dallas Stewart, who also trained Lemons Forever and Unbridled Forever. Although Stewart called her a slow developer when she was preparing for the Kentucky Oaks in 2015, he predicted she would get better with age.

== Racing career ==
On November 9, 2014, Forever Unbridled made her first start in a maiden special weight race for two-year-old fillies at Churchill Downs, finishing second. She then broke her maiden on December 12 at the Fair Grounds.

Forever Unbridled started her three-year-old campaign in the Silverbulletday Stakes on January 17, 2015, a race Unbridled Forever had won the year before. She settled in mid-pack in the early running then made a strong rally in the stretch to finish second to I'm a Chatterbox. She then finished third in both the Rachel Alexandra Stakes and Fair Grounds Oaks. This earned her enough points to qualify for the Kentucky Oaks, but she was well beaten in eleventh place.

Stewart gave her some time off then entered her in the Raven Run Stakes at Keeneland of October 17, in which she finished fifth. Forever Unbridled finally won her first stakes race in the Comely Stakes at Aqueduct on November 28.

=== 2016: four-year-old season ===
Forever Unbridled began her four-year-old campaign in the Grade III Houston Ladies Classic on January 30, 2016, at Sam Houston Race Park. She settled in fourth place behind Cassatt, who set moderate opening fractions. Forever Unbridled began her move on the far turn and moved by a tiring Cassatt in the stretch to win by 1 3/4 lengths.

She then entered the Apple Blossom Handicap at Oaklawn Park on April 15, where her main rival was the 2014 champion filly Untapable. Untapable set the early pace with Forever Unbridled stalking in third place on the outside. On the turn, Forever Unbridled made her move with longshot Streamline, then pulled away down the stretch to win by 2 1/4 lengths. It was her third straight stakes win and first at the Grade I level.

On June 11, Forever Unbridled finished second to Cavorting in the Ogden Phipps Stakes at Belmont Park. She then finished third in the Personal Ensign Stakes at Saratoga on August 27.

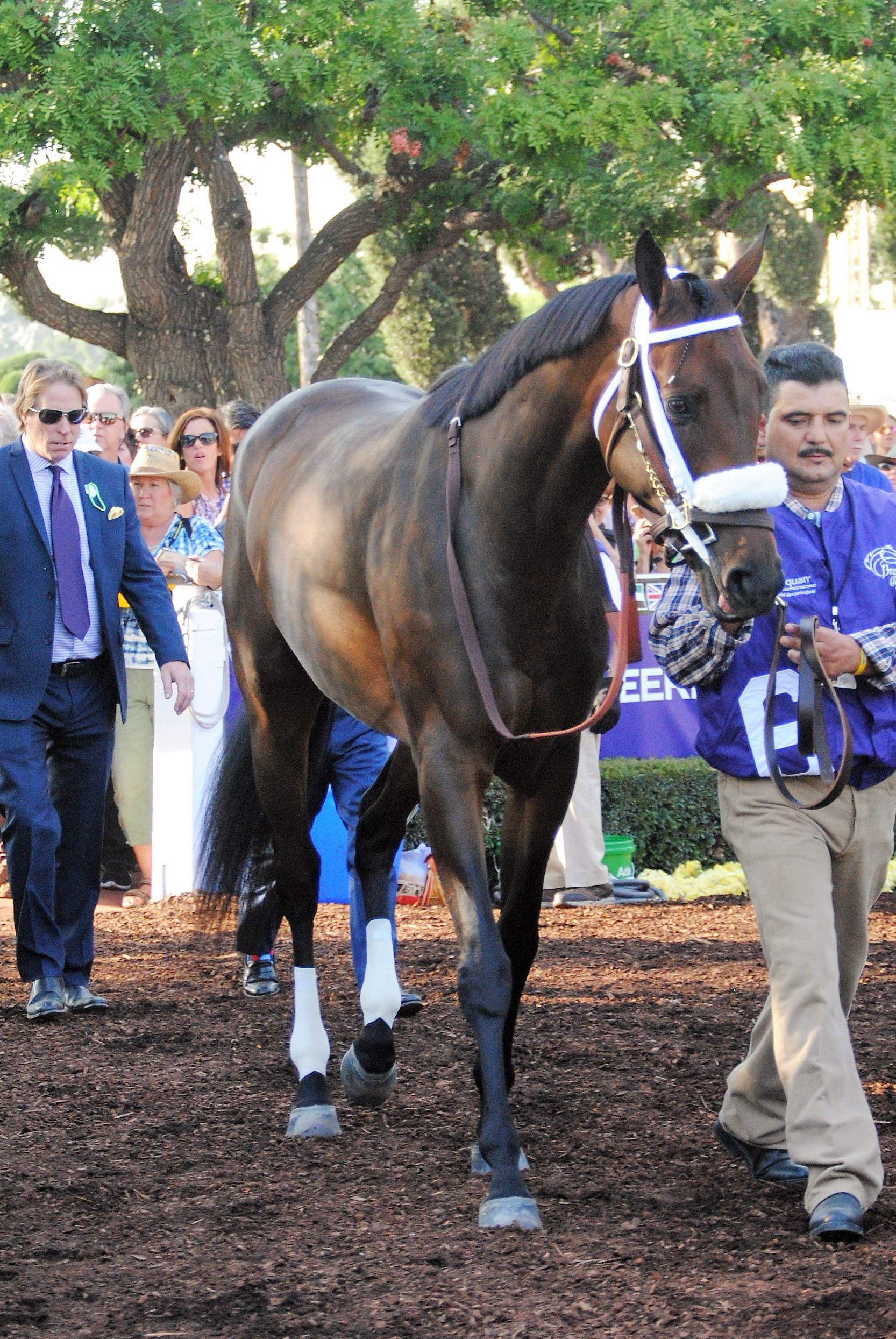
Forever Unbridled before the 2016 Breeders' Cup. Trainer Dallas Stewart at back left

On October 1, she was made the 3-5 favorite in the Beldame Stakes, the major east coast prep for the Breeders' Cup Distaff. On a muddy track, she rated behind a slow early pace before "inhaling them all" down the stretch to win by 2 1/4 lengths. "I think there's more to come," said Stewart. "She's tough, she really is."

The 2016 Breeders' Cup Distaff, held at Santa Anita Park on November 4, featured one of the strongest fields in its history. It was headlined by the undefeated champion Songbird, three-time Eclipse Award winner Beholder and Stellar Wind, who had beaten Beholder twice in the lead up to the Distaff. Forever Unbridled was largely overlooked at odds of 15-1. In a dramatic race, Beholder nosed Songbird at the wire for the win, with Forever Unbridled putting in a strong run to finish third.

=== 2017: five-year-old season ===
Forever Unbridled had a bone chip removed after the Distaff and was given some time off. She made her five-year-old debut in the Fleur de Lis Handicap at Churchill Downs on June 17, 2017. Her main rivals were Big World (La Troienne Stakes), Romantic Vision (second in the La Troienne) and Weep No More (Ashland Stakes). She settled in fifth during the early portion of the race, then made a five-wide move as they turned into the stretch, eventually winning by 1 3/4 lengths.

Forever Unbridled was next entered in the Personal Ensign Stakes on August 26, where she faced off again with Songbird. After stumbling at the break, Forever Unbridled settled into stride at the back of the four-horse field. Songbird set a sensible pace and had a comfortable lead as they rounded the turn, when Forever Unbridled started her move from five lengths behind. Down the stretch, Forever Unbridled steadily closed the gap while racing in the middle of the track. In the final strides, Forever Unbridled moved to the lead and won by a neck.

Stewart originally intended to prep for the Breeders' Cup Distaff in the Beldame, but decided instead to train the mare straight up to the race. Then shortly before the Distaff, Fipke decided to replace her regular rider Joel Rosario with Hall of Fame jockey John Velazquez. Because the change was made so close to the race, the California stewards invoked the Dual Jockey Fee rule, meaning Fipke would have to pay jockey fees and a share of any winnings to both Rosario and Velazquez.

The field for the Distaff was considered closely matched between the older horse division led by Stellar Wind and Forever Unbridled against a competitive three-year-old division led by Elate (Alabama, Beldame Stakes), Paradise Woods (Santa Anita Oaks, Zenyatta Stakes) and Abel Tasman (Kentucky Oaks, Acorn). Longshot Champagne Room went to the early lead followed closely by Paradise Woods, with Forever Unbridled rating near the back of the main pack in sixth. The field bunched up rounding the final turn, then Forever Unbridled moved to the lead with Paradise Woods. The two battled down the stretch with Forever Unbridled gradually pulling clear. Abel Tasman, who had trailed the field early, made a late run to close to within a half length, with Paradise Woods three lengths further behind in third.

Stewart called Forever Unbridled the best horse he'd ever trained and commended Fipke for not retiring her when the bone chip was discovered. "Nine out of 10 guys would have retired her," he said. "But [Fipke], being the sportsman he is (who) loves racing, wanted to see this happen for her. And he did."

For his part, Fipke said that winning at the Breeders' Cup was harder than finding a diamond mine. "You don't realize how many other horses that we pay the oats and the bills and the training bills and everything just to get the one," he said. "And the odds are pretty stacked against you."

Forever Unbridled was voted American Champion Older Dirt Female Horse for 2017.

== Retirement ==
In March 2018, Fipke announced that Forever Unbridled was being retired and would be bred to Medaglia d'Oro. However, he decided to keep her in training for one more race in an attempt for her to become the first mare to win the Dubai World Cup, held on March 31. She moved into contention on the final turn but could not sustain her run and finished fifth.

== Pedigree ==
Pedigree of Forever Unbridled, bay mare, foaled April 24, 2012
Sire Unbridled's Song 1993	Unbridled; 1987	Fappiano	Mr. Prospector
Sire Unbridled's Song 1993	Unbridled; 1987	Fappiano	Killaloe
Sire Unbridled's Song 1993	Unbridled; 1987	Gana Facil	*Le Fabuleux
Sire Unbridled's Song 1993	Unbridled; 1987	Gana Facil	Charedi
Sire Unbridled's Song 1993	Trolley Song; 1983	Caro (IRE)	=Fortino II (FR)
Sire Unbridled's Song 1993	Trolley Song; 1983	Caro (IRE)	=Chambord
Sire Unbridled's Song 1993	Trolley Song; 1983	Lucky Spell	Lucky Mel
Sire Unbridled's Song 1993	Trolley Song; 1983	Lucky Spell	Incantation
Dam Lemons Forever 2003	Lemon Drop Kid; 1996	Kingmambo	Mr. Prospector
Dam Lemons Forever 2003	Lemon Drop Kid; 1996	Kingmambo	Miesque
Dam Lemons Forever 2003	Lemon Drop Kid; 1996	Charming Lassie	Seattle Slew
Dam Lemons Forever 2003	Lemon Drop Kid; 1996	Charming Lassie	Lassie Dear
Dam Lemons Forever 2003	Critikola (ARG); 1995	Tough Critic	*Grey Dawn II
Dam Lemons Forever 2003	Critikola (ARG); 1995	Tough Critic	In Devotion
Dam Lemons Forever 2003	Critikola (ARG); 1995	=Hola Keats (ARG)	*Keats
Dam Lemons Forever 2003	Critikola (ARG); 1995	=Hola Keats (ARG)	Hello Love (family: 4-m)

Forever Unbridled is inbred 4 x 4 to Mr. Prospector, meaning this stallion appears twice in the fourth generation of her pedigree.
