= Take Charge Lady =

American Thoroughbred racehorse

- Sire: Dehere
- Grandsire: Deputy Minister
- Dam: Felicita
- Damsire: Rubiano
- Sex: Mare
- Foaled: 4 February 1999
- Country: United States
- Color: Bay
- Breeder: William Schettine
- Owner: Select Stable
- Trainer: Kenneth McPeek
- Record: 22: 11-7-0
- Earnings: $2,480,377

Major wins
- Alcibiades Stakes (2001); Silverbulletday Stakes (2002); Fair Grounds Oaks (2002); Ashland Stakes (2002); Dogwood Stakes (2002); Spinster Stakes (2002, 2003); Arlington Matron Stakes (2003)

Awards
- Top Kentucky-based filly or mare (2002, 2003); Kentucky Broodmare of the Year (2013)
- Last updated on 16 February 2022

Take Charge Lady (foaled 4 February 1999) is an American Thoroughbred racehorse and broodmare. She was one of the leading fillies of her generation in the United States, winning 11 of her 22 races between April 2001 and November 2003, earning over $2 million. She recorded Grade I victories in the Ashland Stakes and consecutive editions of the Spinster Stakes, and also won the Alcibiades Stakes, Silverbulletday Stakes, Fair Grounds Oaks, Dogwood Stakes and Arlington Matron Stakes.

After her retirement from racing she became a successful broodmare, producing the Grade I winners Take Charge Indy, winner of the 2012 Florida Derby and Will Take Charge, 2013 Champion Three-Year-Old Male Horse. In addition, her first foal Charming is the dam of the Breeders' Cup Juvenile Fillies winner Take Charge Brandi.

== Background ==
Take Charge Lady is a bay mare with a white star bred in Kentucky by William Schettine, the owner of the Florida-based Signature Stallions stud. During her racing career she was described a being "lean" and "lanky" in appearance. She was sired by Dehere, the American Champion two-year-old colt of 1993 whose other progeny included Defier (George Main Stakes) and Graeme Hall (Jim Dandy Stakes). Take Charge Lady's dam Felicita, was an unraced daughter of the American Champion Sprint Horse Rubiano.

As a yearling, the filly was consigned by Bluewater Sales to the Fasig-Tipton sale and was bought for $175,000 by the trainer Kenneth McPeek, acting as an agent. She entered the ownership of Jerry and Faye Bach's Select Stable and was trained during her racing career by McPeek.

== Racing career ==
=== 2001: two-year-old season ===
Take Charge Lady was ridden in most of her early races by Tony D'Amico. The filly made her debut by winning a maiden race at Keeneland in April, but was then off the track for almost five months before returning to win an allowance race over one mile at Turfway Park in September. Four weeks later Take Charge Lady was moved up in class distance and started at odds of 5.8/1 for the Grade II Alcibiades Stakes over eight and a half furlong at Keeneland. D'Amico tracked the favorite Never Out before sending his mount into the lead early in the stretch and winning by a length. McPeek described the winner as "just class top to bottom... she's very, very, very special", before adding "I'm just trying to keep from messing her up".

Take Charge Lady was stepped up again on 27 October for the Breeders' Cup Juvenile Fillies at Belmont Park and was made the 11/1 fourth choice in the betting behind the Frizette Stakes winner You, Bella Bellucci and Habibti. She disputed the lead in the early stages but faded in the second half of the race and finished sixth of the nine runner behind Tempera. On her final appearance of the season, the filly started favorite for the Grade II Golden Rod Stakes at Churchill Downs but was beaten four and a half lengths by the Carl Nafzger-trained Belterra, to whom she was conceding five pounds.

=== 2002: three-year-old season ===
Take Charge Lady began her second season with two races at Fair Grounds Race Course in New Orleans. Jon Court took over the ride from D'Amico when the filly made her seasonal debut in the Grade III Silverbulletday Stakes over one and one sixteenth of a mile on February 16. Starting the 1.6/1 favorite, she led from the start and drew away from her four opponents to win by eight and a half lengths from Charmed Gift. Her winning time of 1:42.09 equaled the track record. Take Charge Lady was reunited with D'Amico and started 1/2 favorite for the Grade II Fair Grounds Oaks over the same distance three weeks later. Racing on a sloppy track, she took the lead soon after the start and accelerated clear in the stretch to win by five length from Lake Lady. Following the race D'Amico said that the winner was "turning into something extraordinary" whilst owner Jerry Bach was jubilant after winning the Louisiana Derby with Repent earlier on the card. On April 6 the filly was moved back into Grade I class and faced a rematch with Belterra in the Ashland Stakes (a trial race for the Kentucky Oaks) at Keeneland. She recovered from being bumped at the start to overtake Colonial Glitter at half-distance, went clear of the field entering the stretch, and won by four and a quarter lengths from Take the Cake, with Belterra a further two and a half lengths back in third place. The filly's success gave D'Amico his first at Grade I level and gave him compensation for losing the rides on the Kentucky Derby contenders Repent and Harlan's Holiday. He commented; "This is just a remarkable day for me. It takes a lot of the pain away".

McPeek considered running the filly against colts in the Kentucky Derby, but opted instead to contest the Kentucky Oaks at Churchill Downs on May 3. Take Charge Lady started the 1.6/1 favorite ahead You, Imperial Gesture (winner of the UAE Oaks) and Habibti in a nine-runner field. She took the lead soon after the start and went two lengths clear of her opponents in the straight but was caught a hundred yards from the finish and beaten one and a quarter lengths by the 20/1 outsider Farda Amiga. After being ruled out of the Black-Eyed Susan Stakes by a lung infection, the filly was then dropped in class for the Grade III Dogwood Stakes at the same course three weeks later. Starting the 0.3/1 favorite, she raced in second place behind French Satin before taking the lead entering the second turn, going three lengths clear before being eased down to win by one and three quarter lengths from Charmed Gift. Immediately after the race McPeek expressed his opinion that the filly was capable of winning the Breeders' Cup Distaff and the Eclipse Award. Plans to run Take Charge Lady in the Mother Goose Stakes were abandoned after McPeek became concerned by the filly's condition. He explained that she had she had not been eating well and that blood tests had shown her to be "a touch dehydrated".

After a break of three and a half months, Take Charge Lady returned in September in the Grade I Gazelle Stakes over nine furlongs at Belmont Park in which she was ridden for the first time by Edgar Prado who became her regular jockey. Carrying top weight of 121 pounds, she tracked the wire-to-wire winner Imperial Gesture throughout the race before finishing second, two and a half lengths behind the winner, but six lengths clear of the favorite Bella Bellucci in third. Take Charge Lady was then matched against older fillies and mares for the first time in the Spinster Stakes at Keeneland on October 6. She started 11/10 favorite against opponents including You, Dancethruthedawn (Go For Wand Handicap) and Victory Ride (Test Stakes). Prado restrained the filly on the inside rail before moving up on the final turn to take the lead from You and took a clear advantage in the stretch to win by two and a half lengths from her fellow three-year-old with the five-year-old Chilean mare Printemps in third. Prado said that the winner "took off like a rocket", whilst You's jockey Kent Desormeaux admitted that Take Charge Lady was "just too good".

At Arlington Park twenty days later, the filly started second favorite for the nineteenth running of the Breeders' Cup Distaff. Drawn on the outside of the eight-runner field she raced in third place but tired in the closing stages to finish sixth behind the favorite Azeri beaten more than thirteen lengths by the winner. She was later found to have been suffering from another lung infection. On November 28 she started odds-on favorite under top weight of 122 pounds for the Falls City Handicap at Churchill Downs but was beaten one and quarter lengths by Allamerican Bertie. Take Charge Lady ended her season in the ungraded NTRA Great State Challenge Distaff Invitational Stakes at Sam Houston Race Park in Texas. Starting at odds of 1/10 she led from the start and won easily by three and a half lengths from three opponents.

=== 2003: four-year-old season ===
On her first appearance as a four-year-old, Take Charge Lady was ridden for the first time by Shane Sellers (returning from a long injury layoff) when she contested the Grade I Apple Blossom Handicap at Oaklawn on April 5. She started quickly and led from the start, maintaining her advantage until the final strides when she was overtaken by Azeri and finished second by a head. After a two and a half month break partly necessitated by a training injury at Churchill Downs in May the filly returned in the Grade I Ogden Phipps Handicap at Belmont Park on 21 June in which she was re-united with Prado. As in her previous appearance she set the pace before being overtaken in the straight: on this occasion she was beaten five lengths by the Bobby Frankel-trained Sightseek. A month later she was dropped in class for the Delaware Handicap (then a Grade II race) and finished second for the third time running, beaten six lengths by the Chilean filly Wild Spirit after leading until the last quarter mile.

Take Charge Lady began her autumn campaign in the Grade III Arlington Matron Handicap on September 1. Ridden by Sellers she started the 0.3/1 favorite in a six-runner field, conceding at least six pounds to her opponents. After tracking the leader Fly Borboleta she took the lead a quarter of a mile from the finish and drew away to win by eleven lengths from Lakenheath. Sellers commented "She's something else. She's a joy to ride. She's been the highlight of my comeback." On October 5 at Keeneland, Take Charge Lady attempted to become the fourth horse after Bornastar, Susan's Girl and Bayakoa to win the Spinster Stakes for a second time. She was made the 1/2 favorite ahead of You, and four others including Desert Gold and Printemps: there were no three-year-olds in the six-runner field. After racing just behind the leaders, Prado sent the filly into the lead on the penultimate turn, opened up a clear advantage entering the straight and held off the renewed challenge of You to win by a head, with a gap of four lengths back to Miss Linda in third place. After the race Prado said "She got a little tired the last seventy yards but these kind of horses give you everything to the wire. It was a game performance". Three weeks later Take Charge Lady made her second bid to win the Breeders' Cup Distaff, which was run that year at Santa Anita Park and started the 8/1 fourth choice in the betting behind Sightseek, Got Koko and Elloluv. She raced just behind the leaders in the early stages, but dropped away in the second half of the race and finished sixth of the seven runners behind the 40/1 outsider Adoration. Take Charge Lady was reunited with her first jockey, Tony D'Amico, when she made her last track appearance in the Falls River Handicap on November 27. She started odds-on favorite despite carrying top weight of 123 pounds, but tired in the closing stages and finished fifth of the ten runners behind Lead Story.

Her retirement was announced on December 2. Jerry Bach commented "Take Charge Lady has done more than enough on the track and it's time for her to embark on her new career. She's a very honest filly and has given us one thrill after another".

== Assessment and awards ==
Take Charge Lady was named Top Kentucky-based filly or mare (the Morris Code Award) in both 2002 and 2003. She was the top-earning three-year-old filly in the United States (and the eleventh highest-earnest overall) in 2002 but was beaten to the Eclipse award by Farda Amiga.

Take Charge Lady was awarded the title of Kentucky Broodmare of the Year for 2013 at the annual awards for Kentucky-bred horses in April 2014.

== Breeding record ==
Take Charge Lady began her broodmare career at the Three Chimneys Farm in Midway, Kentucky. In November 2004, Take Charge Lady was offered for sale at Keeneland and was bought for $4.2 million by Eaton Sales, acting on behalf of a partnership of Kentucky breeders. Her progeny to date are as follows:

- Charming, a chestnut filly, foaled in 2005, sired by Seeking The Gold. Charming, who sold for $3.2 million at Keeneland as a yearling, was trained by Todd Pletcher and raced three times as a three-year-old in 2008. She won on her debut at Keeneland, but sustained a serious injury at Monmouth Park in July and was retired from racing. Charming's foals include Take Charge Brandi and Omaha Beach.
- Love Pegasus, a dark bay or brown colt, foaled in 2006, sired by Fusaichi Pegasus. Love Pegasus was exported to race in Europe where he was gelded. He won two minor races at Kempton Park Racecourse in 2009 in a twenty-three race career.
- Elarose, a dark bay or brown filly, foaled in 2007, sired by Storm Cat. Elarose raced in the United States but failed to win in nine attempts.
- Take Charge Indy, a dark bay or brown colt, foaled in 2009, sired by A.P. Indy. He was sold privately after failing to reach his reserve price at Keeneland. He won the Florida Derby in 2012 and returned from a long injury layoff to win the Alysheba Stakes in 2013 before sustaining a career-ending injury in the Monmouth Cup. He began his stud career at WinStar Farm in 2014.
- Will Take Charge, a chestnut colt, foaled in 2010, sired by Unbridled's Song. He was bought for $425,000 at Keeneland by Willis D. Horton. of Three Chimneys Farm and sent into training with the veteran D. Wayne Lukas. In 2013 he won the Grade I Travers Stakes, Pennsylvania Derby and Clark Handicap. Also second by a scant nose to Mucho Macho Man in the 2013 Breeders' Cup Classic, he was named American Champion Three-Year-Old Male Horse. He added a win in the Oaklawn Handicap in 2014 before being retired to stud.
- I'll Take Charge, a bay filly, foaled in 2012, sired by Indian Charlie. She was sold for $2.2 million to Mandy Pope's Whisper Hill Farm at the 2013 Keeneland Sale, And dam of a top Kentucky derby contender and 2022 Dwyer Stakes by 22 lengths, charge it
- Conquering, a bay filly, foaled in 2013, sired by War Front.
- as time goes by, foaled in 2017, sired by American Pharoah, winner of the 2022 beholder mile, and trained by Bob Baffert.

== Pedigree ==
Pedigree of Take Charge Lady (USA), bay mare, 1999
Sire Dehere (USA) 1991	Deputy Minister (CAN); 1979	Vice Regent	Northern Dancer
Sire Dehere (USA) 1991	Deputy Minister (CAN); 1979	Vice Regent	Victoria Regina
Sire Dehere (USA) 1991	Deputy Minister (CAN); 1979	Mint Copy	Bunty's Flight
Sire Dehere (USA) 1991	Deputy Minister (CAN); 1979	Mint Copy	Shakney
Sire Dehere (USA) 1991	Sister Dot (USA); 1985	Secretariat	Bold Ruler
Sire Dehere (USA) 1991	Sister Dot (USA); 1985	Secretariat	Somethingroyal
Sire Dehere (USA) 1991	Sister Dot (USA); 1985	Sword Game	Damascus
Sire Dehere (USA) 1991	Sister Dot (USA); 1985	Sword Game	Bill And I
Dam Felicita (USA) 1994	Rubiano (USA); 1987	Fappiano	Mr. Prospector
Dam Felicita (USA) 1994	Rubiano (USA); 1987	Fappiano	Killaloe
Dam Felicita (USA) 1994	Rubiano (USA); 1987	Ruby Slippers	Nijinsky
Dam Felicita (USA) 1994	Rubiano (USA); 1987	Ruby Slippers	Moon Glitter
Dam Felicita (USA) 1994	Grand Bonheur (USA); 1979	Blushing Groom	Red God
Dam Felicita (USA) 1994	Grand Bonheur (USA); 1979	Blushing Groom	Runaway Bride
Dam Felicita (USA) 1994	Grand Bonheur (USA); 1979	Director	Swaps
Dam Felicita (USA) 1994	Grand Bonheur (USA); 1979	Director	Times Two (Family 22-c)
