= Singspiel Stakes =

Horse race in Canada

- Class: Grade III
- Location: Woodbine Racetrack; Toronto, Ontario, Canada
- Inaugurated: 2005
- Race type: Thoroughbred - Flat racing
- Website: woodbineentertainment.com

Race information
- Distance: 1 1/2 miles (12 furlongs)
- Surface: Turf
- Track: Left-handed
- Qualification: Three-year-olds & up
- Weight: Assigned
- Purse: $125,000 (2017)

The Singspiel Stakes is a Thoroughbred horse race run annually at Woodbine Racetrack in Toronto, Ontario, Canada. The Stakes is run during the latter part of June on the same card as the Queen's Plate, as of 2008 it carries Grade III status. The race is open to horses aged three and older and is contested over a distance of 1 1/2 miles on turf. It currently offers a purse of $125,000.

Inaugurated in 2005, the race was named for Irish-bred Singspiel, who won the prestigious Canadian International Stakes at Woodbine Racetrack in 1996 and who was a son of the Canadian Horse Racing Hall of Fame filly, Glorious Song.

== Records ==
Speed record:

- 2:27.15 - Jambalaya (2006) 1 1/2 mile
- 2:00.67 - Count Again (2020) 1 1/4 mile
- 2:15.40 - Haunted Dream (2025) 1 3/8 mile

Most wins:

- 3 - Musketier (2009, 2011, 2012)
- 3 - Aldous Snow (2014, 2015, 2017)

Most wins by a jockey:

- 3 - Jono Jones (2006, 2007, 2009)

Most wins by a trainer:

- 9 - Roger L. Attfield (2007, 2009, 2010, 2011, 2012, 2013, 2016, 2019, 2022)

Most wins by an owner:

- 4 - Sam-Son Farm (2014, 2015, 2017, 2020)

== Winners of the Singspiel Stakes ==
Year	Winner	Age	Jockey	Trainer	Owner	Time
2026	Tomasello	4	Emma-Jayne Wilson	Mark E. Casse	Ironhorse Racing Stable and T-N-T Equine Holdings	2:16.67
2025	Haunted Dream (IRE)	6	Rafael Manuel Hernandez	H.A. Al Jehani	Wathnan Racing	2:15.40
2024	True Quality	4	Vincent Cheminaud	Jonathan Thomas	Augustin Stables	2:17.47
2023	Palazzi	5	Sahin Civaci	Mark E. Casse	Gary Barber	2:02.26
2022	Ready For The Lady	3	Emma-Jayne Wilson	Roger L. Attfield	Charles E. Fipke	2:18.12
2021	Corelli	6	Kazushi Kimura	Jonathan Thomas	Augustin Stable	2:01.70
2020	Count Again	5	Luis Contreras	Gail Cox	Sam-Son Farm	2:00.67
2019	Tiz A Slam	5	Steven Ronald Bahen	Roger L. Attfield	Chiefswood Stable	2:29.99
2018	Shahroze	4	Alan Garcia	Graham Motion	Eclipse Thoroughbred Partners & Head Of Plains Partners	2:25.65
2017	Aldous Snow	8	Eurico Rosa Da Silva	Malcolm Pierce	Sam-Son Farm	2:27.42
2016	Danish Dynaformer	4	Patrick Husbands	Roger L. Attfield	Charles E. Fipke	2:27.20
2015	Aldous Snow	6	Eurico Rosa Da Silva	Malcolm Pierce	Sam-Son Farm	2:27.55
2014	Aldous Snow	5	Javier Castellano	Malcolm Pierce	Sam-Son Farm	2:28.85
2013	Forte Dei Marmi	7	Joel Rosario	Roger L. Attfield	Stella Perdomo	2:41.85
2012	Musketier	10	Ramon Dominguez	Roger L. Attfield	Stella Perdomo	2:28.07
2011	Musketier	9	John Velazquez	Roger L. Attfield	Stella Perdomo	2:29.54
2010	Spice Route	6	Mike E. Smith	Roger L. Attfield	Harlequin Ranches	2:27.74
2009	Musketier	7	Jono Jones	Roger L. Attfield	Johanna Louise Glen-Teven	2:27.41
2008	Mission Approved	4	Ramon Dominguez	Gary Contessa	William F. Coyro, Jr.	2:30.63
2007	Pellegrino	8	Jono Jones	Roger L. Attfield	Gary A. Tanaka	2:27.79
2006	Jambalaya	4	Jono Jones	Catherine Day Phillips	Todd & Catherine D. Phillips	2:27.15
2005	Daddy Cool	7	Jim McAleney	Sean Smullen	Stronach Stables	2:27.66

== See also ==
- List of Canadian flat horse races
