= Midnight Lute =

American-bred Thoroughbred racehorse

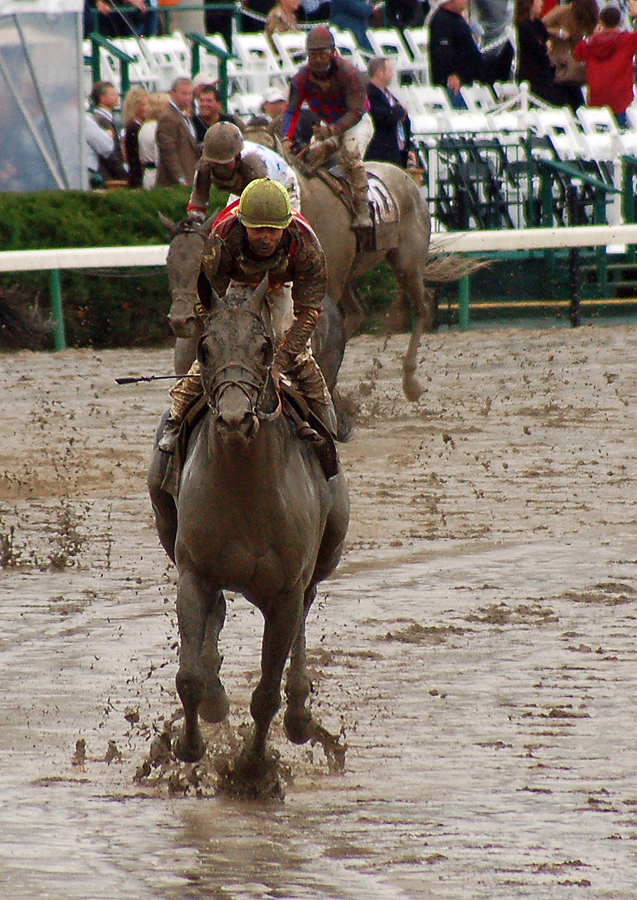
- Sire: Real Quiet
- Grandsire: Quiet American
- Dam: Candytuft
- Damsire: Dehere
- Sex: Stallion
- Foaled: 2003
- Country: United States
- Colour: Dark Bay
- Breeder: Tom Evans, Macon Wilmil Equines & Marjac Farms, Inc.
- Owner: Michael E. Pegram and Watson and Weitman Performance, LLC
- Trainer: Bob Baffert
- Record: 12: 6-3-1
- Earnings: US$2,690,600

Major wins
- Perryville Stakes (2006); Forego Handicap (2007); Breeders' Cup wins: Breeders' Cup Sprint (2007, 2008)

Awards
- American Champion Sprint Horse (2007)

Midnight Lute (foaled May 13, 2003, in Versailles, Kentucky) is an American Thoroughbred racehorse. He was named American Champion Sprint Horse in 2007.

== Background ==
Midnight Lute was bred by Tom Evans, Macon Wilmil Equines & Marjac Farms, Inc. and owned during his racing career by Michael E. Pegram and Watson and Weitman Performance, LLC. He was named for Lute Olson, the University of Arizona basketball coach. He was sired by the Kentucky Derby and Preakness Stakes winner Real Quiet and was out of the mare Candytuft. His damsire is Dehere, a multiple stakes winner and the 1993 American Champion Two-Year-Old Colt. Midnight Lute was sold as a yearling for $70,000 at the Keeneland September sales. He was trained by three-time Kentucky Derby winning trainer Bob Baffert.

== Racing career ==
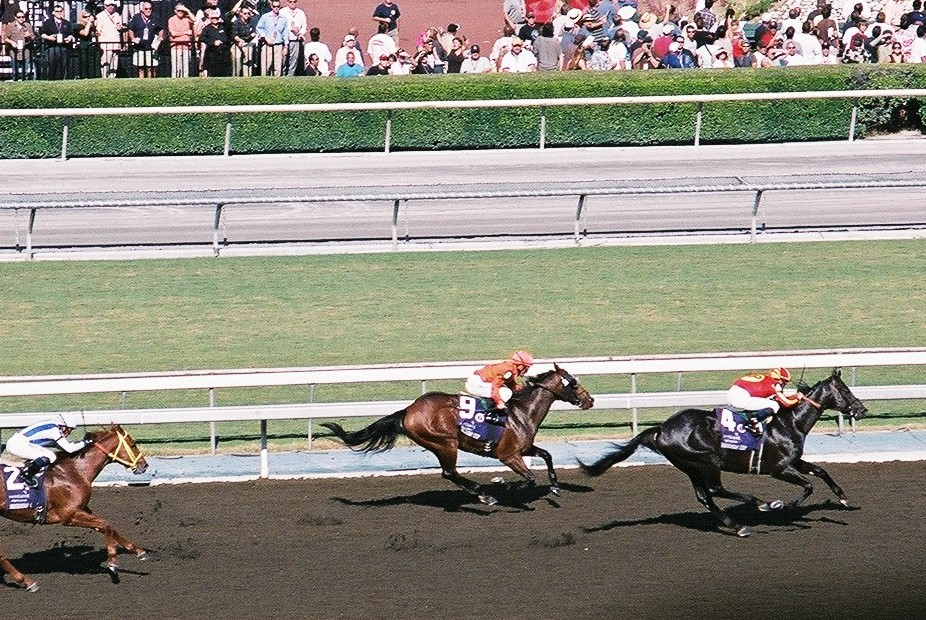
Winning the Breeders' Cup Sprint, 2008

Midnight Lute won the Grade 3 Perryville Stakes at Keeneland Race Course on October 13, 2006, in track-record time. He collected his first Grade I win on September 1, 2007, while setting a new stakes record in the Forego Handicap at Saratoga Race Course.

He also placed in several graded stakes, including the Malibu Stakes (3rd, Grade I) and the San Fernando Stakes (2nd, Grade II) at Santa Anita Park.

On October 27, 2007, Midnight Lute scored the most important victory of his career when he won the six-furlong Breeders' Cup Sprint at Monmouth Park, ridden by Garrett Gomez. Coming from last to first, he won by 4 3/4 lengths over a sloppy track in a time of 1:09.18, with Idiot Proof second and Talent Search third.

An injury kept him away from the races for most of the 2008 season. In his first start of the year, he finished 10th in the Pat O'Brien Handicap at Del Mar Racetrack. His second start was the Breeders' Cup Sprint at Santa Anita Park on October 25. He won the six-furlong race in a final time of 1:07:08 on a fast track. Fatal Bullet ran second, with Street Boss third. With that win, Midnight Lute became the first horse to repeat in the Breeders' Cup Sprint.

On October 28, 2008, it was announced that Midnight Lute would be retired to stand stud at Hill 'n' Dale Farms in Kentucky for an initial fee of $20,000.

== Assessment and honors ==
In the 2007 Forego Handicap, Midnight Lute earned the year's highest Beyer Speed Figure of 124.

In the voting for the 2007 American Champion Sprint Horse award, Midnight Lute received 229 of the 267 votes.

Midnight Lute was a finalist for the Eclipse Award's American Champion Sprint Horse for 2008, but with a final vote of 106 to 86 lost to Benny The Bull.

== Stud career ==
Midnight Lute's descendants include:

c = colt, f = filly

Foaled	Name	Sex	Major Wins
2010	Midnight Cello	c	Hanshin Cup Handicap
2010	Midnight Lucky	c	Acorn Stakes
2010	Shakin It Up	c	Malibu Stakes
2010	Tiz Midnight	c	Bayakoa Handicap
2011	Midnight Hawk	c	Sham Stakes
2012	Midnight Miley	c	Seaway Stakes, Ontario Matron Stakes
2014	Midnight Pleasure	c	Forego Handicap
2015	Midnight Bisou	f	Santa Anita Oaks, Ogden Phipps Handicap, Houston Ladies Classic, Cotillion Handicap, Mother Goose Stakes, Santa Ysabel Stakes, Santa Ynez Stakes, Saudi Cup
2015	Midnight Disguise	c	Busher Stakes
