= Perryville Stakes =

- Class: Grade III
- Location: Keeneland Race Course; Lexington, Kentucky, United States
- Inaugurated: 1999
- Race type: Thoroughbred – Flat racing
- Website: www.keeneland.com/default.aspx

Race information
- Distance: 7 furlongs
- Surface: dirt
- Track: left-handed
- Qualification: three-years-olds
- Weight: 123 lbs with allowances
- Purse: US$350,000 (since 2025)

The Perryville Stakes is a Grade III American Thoroughbred horse race for three years olds, over a distance of a seven furlongs on the dirt held annually in October at Keeneland Race Course in Lexington, Kentucky. The event currently carries a purse of $350,000.

== History ==
The event is named after the city of Perryville located along the Chaplin River in western Boyle County, Kentucky.

The inaugural running of the event was on October 21, 1999, on the Beard course over the seven furlong and 184 feet distance event with National Saint the 9/5 second favorite, trained by US Hall of Fame trainer Bob Baffert ridden by Robby Albarado defeating Moon Over Prospect winning by a five lengths in a time of 1:22.61.

After six runnings, the event was upgraded in status in 2005 to Grade III. The winner Vicarage streaked away to a ten-length victory which to date is the stakes record.

From 2006 until 2009 the event was held on the new Polytrack surface.

The event was not held from 2010 to 2014 and it lost its graded status.

In 2015 the event was resumed as a Black Type and was held on the under card of the Breeders' Cup Saturday program over a distance of six furlongs.

From 2016 through 2019 the event once again was not held. In 2020 the event was held on the under card of the Breeders' Cup Saturday program as the first race. The winner of the race, Nashville set a new track record for the six furlong distance.

In 2021 the event was held over a distance of seven furlongs.

In 2024 the event was upgraded to Grade III by the Thoroughbred Owners and Breeders Association.

Several fine horses have won this event include American Champion Sprint Horse Midnight Lute who won the Breeders' Cup Sprint twice.

Gunite won this event, following other sprinters who have also won the race.

== Records ==
Speed record

- 6 furlongs: 1:07.98 – Nashville (2020) (new track record)
- 7 furlongs: 1:22.80 – Brunacini (2024)
- 7 furlongs 184 feet: 1:24.38 – Midnight Lute (2006)

Margins:

- 10 lengths: Vicarage (2005)

Most wins by a Jockey:

- 2 – Robby Albarado (1999, 2003)
- 2 – Pat Day (2001, 2002)
- 2 - Tyler Gaffalione (2022, 2026)

Most wins by a trainer:

- 3 – Bob Baffert (1999, 2006, 2025)

Most wins by an owner:

- No owner has no more than one win

== Winners ==
Year	Winner	Jockey	Trainer	Owner	Distance	Time	Purse	Grade	Ref
2026	Dr. Kapur	Tyler Gaffalione	Saffie A Joseph Jr.	Kenneth L. Ramsey	7 furlongs	1:24.25	$350,000	III	
2025	Barnes	José Ortiz	Bob Baffert	Zedan Racing Stables	7 furlongs	1:23.45	$350,000	III	
2024	Brunacini	Luan Machado	Matthew Sims	Emilie G. Fojan	7 furlongs	1:22.80	$259,000	III	
2023	Raise Cain	Luis Saez	Ben Colebrook	Andrew N. Warren & Rania Warren	7 furlongs	1:23.58	$235,188	Listed	
2022	Gunite	Tyler Gaffalione	Steven M. Asmussen	Winchell Thoroughbreds	7 furlongs	1:23.21	$250,000	Listed	
2021	He'smyhoneybadger	Florent Geroux	Brad H. Cox	Steve Landers Racing	7 furlongs	1:23.75	$150,000		
2020	Nashville	Ricardo Santana Jr.	Steven M. Asmussen	WinStar Farm & China Horse Club	6 furlongs	1:07.89	$125,000		
2016–2019		Race not held							
2015	Hebbronville	Joe Bravo	Lynn S. Whiting	Choctaw Racing Stable, Winning Horse Stable & Scott Galloway	6 furlongs	1:09.78	$100,000		
2010–2014		Race not held							
2009	El Brujo	Edgar S. Prado	Malcolm Pierce	Windways Farm	7 furlongs 184 feet	1:25.95	$150,000	III	
2008	Hatta Fort (GB)	Julien Leparoux	Saeed bin Suroor	Godolphin	7 furlongs 184 feet	1:25.97	$200,000	III	
2007	Steve's Double	Jamie Theriot	Ronny W. Werner	Oxbow Racing	7 furlongs 184 feet	1:25.36	$200,000	III	
2006	Midnight Lute	Victor Espinoza	Bob Baffert	Michael E. Pegram & Watson and Weitman Performance	7 furlongs 184 feet	1:24.38	$200,000	III	
2005	Vicarage	John R. Velazquez	Todd A. Pletcher	Dogwood Stable	7 furlongs 184 feet	1:26.06	$200,000	III	
2004	Commentator	Rafael Bejarano	Nick Zito	Tracy Farmer	7 furlongs 184 feet	1:25.19	$112,600	Listed	
2003	Clock Stopper	Robby Albarado	Dallas Stewart	Overbrook Farm	7 furlongs 184 feet	1:25.33	$108,300	Listed	
2002	Najran	Pat Day	Nick Zito	Buckram Oak Farm	7 furlongs 184 feet	1:26.00	$84,075	Listed	
2001	Dream Run	Pat Day	Paul J. McGee	John D. Murphy Sr.	7 furlongs 184 feet	1:27.25	$81,225	Listed	
2000	Smokin Pete	Shane Sellers	James P. Divito	C P C Racing	7 furlongs 184 feet	1:25.38	$72,000	Listed	
1999	National Saint	Robby Albarado	Bob Baffert	Charles F. Heider Jr.	7 furlongs 184 feet	1:25.21	$62,563	Listed	

Legend:
All Weather Track Dirt

== See also ==
- List of American and Canadian Graded races
