= Chilukki Stakes =

Horse race in Louisville, Kentucky, US

- Class: Grade III
- Location: Churchill Downs; Louisville, Kentucky, United States
- Inaugurated: 1986 (as Churchill Downs Budweiser Breeders' Cup Handicap)
- Race type: Thoroughbred – Flat racing
- Website: Churchill Downs

Race information
- Distance: 1 mile (8 furlongs)
- Surface: Dirt
- Track: left-handed
- Qualification: fillies and mares, three-year-olds and older
- Weight: Base weights with allowances: 4-year-olds and up: 125 lbs. 3-year-olds: 122 lbs.
- Purse: US$300,000 (2021)

The Chilukki Stakes is a Grade III American thoroughbred horse race for fillies and mares age three and older over a distance of one mile on the dirt held annually in November at Churchill Downs in Louisville, Kentucky, during the fall meeting. It currently offers a purse of $300,000.

== History ==
The inaugural running of the event was on 1 November 1986 as the Churchill Downs Budweiser Breeders' Cup Handicap at a distance of seven furlongs and was won by James J. Devaney's three-year-old filly Lazer Show who started as the 4/5 odds-on favorite winning by 2 1/2 lengths ono a fast track in a time of 1:22 3/5. The event was sponsored by Budweiser and the Breeders' Cup with lucrative stakes.

The following year the event was increased to one mile.

In 1988 the American Graded Stakes Committeeclassified the event with Grade III status.

With continued quality competitors the event attracted the race was upgraded to Grade II in 1992.

In 1995 sponsorship from Budweiser and the Breeders' Cup ceased and the event was renamed to the Churchill Downs Distaff Handicap.

In 2000 the event as an undercard race on the Breeders' Cup program was won by the US Champion Two-Year-Old Filly from the previous year, Chilukki who set a new track record of 1:33.57 for the mile distance. Chilukki was no stranger to Churchill Downs having also set the track record for the short 4 1/2 furlongs distance as a two-year-old and winning the Grade III Debutante Stakes. In 2005 the event was renamed in her honor as the Chilukki Stakes.

In 2019 the event was downgraded to Grade III.

== Records ==
Speed record:

- 1 mile: 1:33.57 – Chilukki (2000)

Margins:

- 8 lengths – Hot and Sultry (2023)

Most wins:

- No horse has yet to win more than once.

Most wins by a jockey:

- 4 – Pat Day (1989, 1993, 1994, 2001)
- 4 – Robby Albarado (1997, 2000, 2005, 2010)

Most wins by a trainer:

- 3 – Dale L. Romans (2004, 2014, 2019)
- 3 – George R. Arnold II (1988, 1998, 1999)

Most wins by an owner:

- 2 – G. Watts Humphrey Jr. (1998, 1999)

== Winners ==
Year	Winner	Age	Jockey	Trainer	Owner	Distance	Time	Purse	Grade	Ref
Chilukki Stakes
2025	Shred the Gnar	3	Luis Saez	Bryan Lynch	Flying Dutchman Breeding and Racing	1 mile	1:34.84	$300,000	III	
2024	Two Sharp	3	Junior Alvarado	Philip Brauer	Rigney Racing	1 mile	1:34.40	$297,500	III	
2023	Hot and Sultry	4	Ricardo Santana Jr.	Norm W. Casse	Alex & JoAnn Lieblong	1 mile	1:35.93	$295,000	III	
2022	She Can't Sing	5	Brian Hernandez Jr.	Chris M. Block	Lothenbach Stables	1 mile	1:35.38	$298,500	III	
2021	Obligatory	3	Joel Rosario	William I. Mott	Juddmonte Farms	1 mile	1:34.80	$300,000	III	
2020	Finite	3	Ricardo Santana Jr.	Steven M. Asmussen	Winchell Thoroughbreds, Thomas J. Reiman, William Dickson & Deborah A. Easter	1 mile	1:35.53	$100,000	III	
2019	Sally's Curlin	3	Corey J. Lanerie	Dale L. Romans	CJ Thoroughbreds, Left Turn Racing & Casner Racing	1 mile	1:35.60	$200,000	III	
2018	Divine Miss Grey	4	Manuel Franco	Danny Gargan	Corms Racing Stable & R. A. Hill Stable	1 mile	1:36.64	$200,000	II	
2017	Farrell	3	Channing Hill	Wayne M. Catalano	Coffee Pot Stables	1 mile	1:35.90	$200,000	II	
2016	Kiss to Remember	5	Joseph Rocco Jr.	Martin D. Wolfson	Miller Racing	1 mile	1:35.80	$200,000	II	
2015	Spelling Again	4	Shaun Bridgmohan	Brad H. Cox	Sea Jay Racing	1 mile	1:35.75	$200,000	II	
2014	Molly Morgan	5	Corey J. Lanerie	Dale L. Romans	William D. Cubbedge	1 mile	1:36.97	$237,510	II	
2013	Don't Tell Sophia	5	Joseph Rocco Jr.	Philip A. Sims	Philip A. Sims & Jerry Namy	1 mile	1:35.14	$150,000	II	
2012	Brushed by a Star	4	Corey J. Lanerie	Grant T. Forster	Team Forster	1 mile	1:37.16	$168,900	II	
2011	Buckleupbuttercup	4	Javier Castellano	Eddie Kenneally	Avalon Farms	1 mile	1:37.03	$167,400	II	
2010	Distinctive Dixie	5	Robby Albarado	Wallace Dollase	Robert B. & Beverly J. Lewis Trust	1 mile	1:36.67	$171,900	II	
2009	Malibu Prayer	3	Christopher P. DeCarlo	Todd A. Pletcher	Edward P. Evans	1 mile	1:36.24	$167,550	II	
2008	Leah's Secret	5	Rene R. Douglas	Todd A. Pletcher	WinStar Farm	1 mile	1:35.68	$170,400	II	
2007	Rolling Sea	4	Robby Albarado	Steven M. Asmussen	Millennium Farms	1 mile	1:36.02	$221,000	II	
2006	Sangrita	3	Edgar S. Prado	Michael R. Matz	Dorothy A. Matz	1 mile	1:36.65	$170,250	II	
2005	Bending Strings	4	Robby Albarado	Wallace Dollase	John Gunther	1 mile	1:35.19	$169,350	II	
Churchill Downs Distaff Handicap
2004	Halory Leigh	4	Craig Perret	Dale L. Romans	Jerry Crawford, Matt Gannon & Charlie Grask	1 mile	1:35.05	$230,400	II	
2003	Lead Story	4	Calvin H. Borel	Carl A. Nafzger	A. Stevens Miles Jr.	1 mile	1:36.55	$225,400	II	
2002	Softly	4	Jon Court	Carl A. Nafzger	James B. Tafel	1 mile	1:35.07	$223,600	II	
2001	Nasty Storm	3	Pat Day	Dallas Stewart	Denny Crum, Daryl Elser, Riley McDonald, Joseph Riccelli & Dallas Stewart	1 mile	1:35.30	$222,200	II	
2000	Chilukki	3	Gary L. Stevens	Bob Baffert	Stonerside Stable	1 mile	1:33.57	$248,400	II	
1999	Let	4	Calvin H. Borel	George R. Arnold II	G. Watts Humphrey Jr.	1 mile	1:34.41	$224,000	II	
1998	Dream Scheme	5	Calvin H. Borel	George R. Arnold II	G. Watts Humphrey Jr.	1 mile	1:34.41	$225,200	II	
1997	Feasibility Study	5	Robby Albarado	William I. Mott	Char-Mari Stable	1 mile	1:37.61	$235,800	II	
1996	Fast Catch	4	Willie Martinez	Frank L. Brothers	Lazy Lane Farms	1 mile	1:36.55	$225,200	II	
Churchill Downs Budweiser Breeders' Cup Handicap
1995	Lakeway	4	Kent J. Desormeaux	Gary F. Jones	Michael G. Rutherford	1 mile	1:35.94	$201,200	II	
1994	Educated Risk	4	Pat Day	Claude R. McGaughey III	Ogden Mills Phipps	1 mile	1:35.74	$212,500	II	
1993	Miss Indy Anna	3	Pat Day	Edward T. Allard	Charles Matses	1 mile	1:37.72	$218,400	II	
1992	Wilderness Song	4	Craig Perret	James E. Day	Sam-Son Farm	1 mile	1:36.22	$157,600	II	
1991	Fit for a Queen	5	Ricardo D. Lopez	Steven C. Penrod	Hermitage Farm	1 mile	1:38.60	$154,700	III	
1990	Oh My Jessica Pie	3	Miguel Angel Gonzalez	Emanuel Tortora	Bee Bee Stable	1 mile	1:36.80	$158,450	III	
1989	Classic Value	3	Pat Day	William J. Cesare	Fred W. Hooper	1 mile	1:35.40	$158,400	III	
1988	Darien Miss	3	Patrick A. Johnson	George R. Arnold II	Taylor Asbury	1 mile	1:36.80	$158,350	III	
1987	Bound	3	Eddie Maple	Woodford C. Stephens	Claiborne Farm	1 mile	1:37.00	$158,850		
1986	Lazer Show	3	Charles R. Woods Jr.	Donald R. Winfree	James J. Devaney	7 furlongs	1:22.60	$157,650		

== See also ==
List of American and Canadian Graded races
