= Blast of Storm =

Irish-bred Thoroughbred racehorse

- Sire: Perugino
- Grandsire: Danzig
- Dam: Key Partner
- Damsire: Law Society
- Sex: Stallion
- Foaled: 1996
- Country: Ireland
- Colour: Brown
- Breeder: W. Powell-Harris
- Owner: Lady Sally Arbib
- Trainer: William C. Marshall
- Record: 21: 10-2-5
- Earnings: £169,175

Major wins
- Barbados Gold Cup (2000, 2001, 2002)

Blast of Storm (foaled 1996 in Ireland) was a Barbadian Thoroughbred racehorse who was the first horse to win three consecutive runnings of the Barbados Gold Cup.

Trained by William C. Marshall for owner Lady Sally Arbib, Blast of storm was ridden by Jono Jones in all three of his Gold Cup wins.

Retired from racing, Blast of storm entered stud in Barbados in 2003.

A life-size bronze statue of Blast of Storm now graces the infield opposite the finishing line.

== Pedigree ==
Pedigree of Blast of Storm
Sire Perugino 1991	Danzig 1977	Northern Dancer	Nearctic
Sire Perugino 1991	Danzig 1977	Northern Dancer	Natalma
Sire Perugino 1991	Danzig 1977	Pas de Nom	Admiral's Voyage
Sire Perugino 1991	Danzig 1977	Pas de Nom	Petitioner
Sire Perugino 1991	Fairy Bridge 1975	Bold Reason	Hail to Reason
Sire Perugino 1991	Fairy Bridge 1975	Bold Reason	Lalun
Sire Perugino 1991	Fairy Bridge 1975	Special	Forli
Sire Perugino 1991	Fairy Bridge 1975	Special	Thong
Dam Key Partner 1987	Law Society 1982	Alleged	Hoist The Flag
Dam Key Partner 1987	Law Society 1982	Alleged	Princess Pout
Dam Key Partner 1987	Law Society 1982	Bold Bikini	Boldnesian
Dam Key Partner 1987	Law Society 1982	Bold Bikini	Ran-Tan
Dam Key Partner 1987	Roscrea 1977	Ballymore	Ragusa
Dam Key Partner 1987	Roscrea 1977	Ballymore	Paddy's Sister
Dam Key Partner 1987	Roscrea 1977	Twaddle	Tim Tam
Dam Key Partner 1987	Roscrea 1977	Twaddle	Blarney Bess
