= Robert E. Brennan =

American businessman (born 1944)

Robert Brennan
- Brennan in a First Jersey ad in 1985
- Born: 1944 (age 81–82); Hounsfield, New York, U.S.
- Occupations: Certified public accountant, stockbroker, racetrack owner, racehorse owner
- Spouse(s): Cecelia; Patricia A. (Brennan) Laus
- Children: 3

Robert Emmet Brennan (born 1944) is an American businessman and former accountant who built the infamous penny stock brokerage firm, First Jersey Securities. The firm specialized in promoting penny stocks to unsuspecting investors, many of them elderly, who lost their entire investments when the stocks inevitably crashed.

== Early life ==
Brennan grew up in Newark, New Jersey, one of nine children. He attended Saint Leo's Roman Catholic School in Irvington, and was taught by the School Sisters of Notre Dame. He graduated from St. Benedict's Preparatory School in Newark.

== Career ==
=== First Jersey ===
As a result of this penny stock scheme, Brennan became a target of the Securities and Exchange Commission. First Jersey itself went bankrupt in 1987 and Brennan was found guilty of securities fraud in 1994. He was ordered to pay $75 million to settle the fraud claims.

Brennan declared bankruptcy in 1995 but committed another fraud when he did not declare all of his assets to the court. Brennan withheld from the bankruptcy court that he held $500,000 in casino chips that he had purchased (and later cashed out of after his bankruptcy) and $4 million in municipal bonds he kept in his basement. He then directed an associate to liquidate the bonds overseas and invest them in stocks, which netted him $16 million in ill-gotten gains.

Brennan was also a Certified Public Accountant but his license was revoked as a result of his criminal conviction.

==== Money laundering ====
In 2001 Brennan was found guilty of money-laundering and bankruptcy fraud and sentenced to a prison term of nine years and two months. On appeal, in 2003 the sentence was upheld. Brennan served part of his sentence at the Fort Dix Federal Correctional Institution in Fort Dix, New Jersey. He was released on January 14, 2011, from Fort Dix and was sent to another less harsh prison until July which is when he was released.

=== Thoroughbred racing ===
International Thoroughbred Breeders, Inc., a publicly held company founded and chaired by Brennan, financed the reconstruction of Garden State Park race track in Cherry Hill, New Jersey after it was taken out by a 1977 fire. The grandstand reopened in 1985, closed in 2001, was demolished, and the property redeveloped. Brennan also owned and raced Thoroughbreds under the name Due Process Stable. The best known of his horses were Eclipse Award winners Deputy Minister and his son Dehere, who was bred by Brennan.

Brennan also built and owned the Due Process Stable Golf Club in Colts Neck Township, New Jersey, where he lived until his arrest in 2001.

== Personal life ==
His first wife, Cecelia, was his childhood sweetheart. His second wife was Patricia A. (Brennan) Laus - no children. A major benefactor to Seton Hall University, following his conviction the university's board of governors had Brennan's name removed from a recreation center on its campus in South Orange, New Jersey. Brennan is an alumnus of Seton Hall University and sat on its board of regents.
