= Lemons Forever =

American-bred Thoroughbred racehorse

- Sire: Lemon Drop Kid
- Grandsire: Kingmambo
- Dam: Critikola
- Damsire: Tough Critic
- Sex: Filly
- Foaled: 2003
- Country: United States
- Color: Chestnut
- Breeder: Farfellow Farms Ltd.
- Owner: Leon Willis, Terry Horton, Dallas Stewart
- Trainer: Dallas Stewart
- Record: 16: 4-1-2
- Earnings: US$648,940

Major wins
- Kentucky Oaks (2006)

Awards
- Kentucky Broodmare of the Year (2017)

Lemons Forever (foaled May 24, 2003 in Kentucky) is an American Thoroughbred racehorse best known for winning the Grade I Kentucky Oaks on May 5, 2006. Her win was the biggest upset in the history of the Oaks.

The Kentucky Oaks had a full field of fourteen fillies, with Lemons Forever posting the highest odds, at 47–1. She trailed throughout the race, only to rally late and win by 1½ lengths.

A $2 bet on Lemons Forever paid $96.20, and a $2 trifecta paid $12,186.60.

Lemons Forever did not make a run for the Triple Tiara of Thoroughbred Racing, the filly equivalent of the Triple Crown, as she did not compete in the second leg of the competition, the Black-Eyed Susan Stakes, on May 19.

After winning the Oaks, Lemons Forever raced ten more times (eight Grade 1 and Grade 2 races), only winning once in an optional claimer and running 3rd in the Grade 1 Alabama Stakes at Saratoga. She was retired in 2007.

== Retirement ==
Lemons Forever sold for $2.5 million at the 2007 Keeneland broodmare sale to geologist Charles Fipke. As of 2017, she produced five named foals, four of them winners:

Lemons Forever was named 2017 Kentucky Broodmare of the Year for her foals Forever Unbridled and Unbridled Forever.

- Forever Unbridled: Bay filly foaled in 2012, by Unbridled's Song. Multiple graded stakes winner including Grade I wins in the 2017 Breeders' Cup Distaff, Apple Blossom Handicap, Beldame Stakes, and Personal Ensign Stakes. Earnings of over $2 million and named 2017 American Champion Older Dirt Female Horse.
- Unbridled Forever: Bay filly foaled in 2011, by Unbridled's Song. Ran 3rd in the 2014 Kentucky Oaks and as a 4-year-old won the Grade I Ballerina Stakes, earning over $800,000 in her career.
- Perfect Forever: Chestnut filly foaled in 2009 by Perfect Soul, winless in twelve starts.
- Forever Perfect: Chestnut colt foaled in 2009 by Perfect Soul, two wins in eighteen starts. Stallion in Houston, Ohio.
- Forever d'Oro: Bay colt foaled in 2013 by top sire Medaglia d'Oro, one win from six starts (as of November 2017). Stakes placed. Competed in 2016 Belmont Stakes.
- Lemons Medaglia: Bay filly foaled in 2016, by Medaglia d'Oro.
