= Rickey A. Walcott =

Rickey Walcott
Personal information
- Born: 29 January 1982 (age 44) Barbados
- Occupation: Jockey

Horse racing career
- Sport: Horse racing
- Career wins: 900+ (ongoing)

Major racing wins
- Midsummer Creole Classic (2003); Canadian Derby (2003); Barbados Gold Cup (2007); Massy United Insurance Derby (2014)

Racing awards
- Alberta Champion Jockey (2007)

Significant horses
- Sweet Dreams, Raylene

Rickey A. Walcott (born. c.1982 in Barbados) is a jockey in Thoroughbred horse racing who competes in his homeland and in Canada.

Walcott won the 2003 Canadian Derby at Northlands Park in Edmonton, Alberta and was the top rider there for the 2007 summer meet and the season overall. Also a leading jockey at Stampede Park Racetrack in Calgary, he captured his first Alberta riding title in 2007.
