= Dallas Stewart =

American racehorse trainer (born 1959)

Personal information
- Born: September 15, 1959 (age 66) McComb, Mississippi, United States
- Occupation: Trainer

Horse racing career
- Sport: Horse racing
- Career wins: 989+ (ongoing)

Major racing wins
- Prairie Bayou Stakes (1997); Fort Springs Stakes (1998); Turfway Prevue Stakes (1998); Louisiana Derby (1999); Kentucky Jockey Club Stakes (2000); Churchill Downs Distaff Handicap (2001); Dogwood Breeders' Cup Stakes (2001); Risen Star Stakes (2001); Gallant Bloom Handicap (2002); Robert F. Carey Memorial Handicap (2002); Cigar Mile Handicap (2023); Lecomte Stakes (2003, 2005); Mardi Gras Handicap (2003); Perryville Stakes (2003); Louisiana Champions Day Juvenile (2004); Louisville Handicap (2004, 2005, 2006); Sugar Bowl Stakes (2004); Thoroughbred Club of America Stakes (2004); Cape Hope Stakes (2005); Commonwealth Stakes (2005); Kentucky Cup Turf Stakes (2005); Kentucky Oaks (2006); Derby Trial Stakes (2008); Jim Dandy Stakes (2008); Stars and Stripes Handicap (2008); New Orleans Handicap (2009); Stephen Foster Handicap (2009); Adirondack Stakes (2013); Breeders' Cup wins: Breeders' Cup Distaff (2001); Breeders' Cup Distaff (2017)

Racing awards
- Leading Trainer at Keeneland Race Course (2000)

Significant horses
- Forever Unbridled, Lemons Forever, Macho Again, Silverfoot, Tale of Verve, Unbridled Elaine

Dallas Stewart (born September 15, 1959, in McComb, Mississippi) is a trainer of Thoroughbred racehorses from bases in Kentucky at Churchill Downs Turfway Park, and Keeneland Race Course.

Stewart began his career training under D. Wayne Lukas, with whom he worked for 12 years. There, he oversaw Grade I winning horses like Lady's Secret, Thunder Gulch, Serena's Song, Timber Country, and Tabasco Cat.

In 1999, Stewart trained Kimberlite Pipe to win the Grade II Louisiana Derby and Sapphire and Silk to win the Grade III Prioress Stakes at Belmont Park. Stewart won his first training title at the 2000 Keeneland Race Course Spring Meet. His stakes performers during 2000 included Dollar Bill, who won the Grade II Brown & Williamson Kentucky Jockey Club Stakes at Churchill and competed in all three legs of the Triple Crown.

In 2001, his stable earned more than $3.8 million, topped by Unbridled Elaine's payday for winning the Grade I Breeders' Cup Distaff. He also won two graded events with Nasty Storm—the Grade II Churchill Downs Distaff Handicap and Grade III Dogwood Stakes.

In 2002, Stewart won the Grade II Gallant Bloom Handicap at Belmont Park with Nasty Storm, and other stakes with Sweet Nanette, Kazoo and Saintly Look. In 2003, Saintly Look won the Grade III Lecomte Stakes and Stewart also won the Mardi Gras Handicap at Fair Grounds Race Course in New Orleans, Louisiana with Even the Score and the Perryville Stakes at Keeneland Race Course with Clock Stopper.

In 2006, he won the Kentucky Oaks (G1) with Lemons Forever. He was the trainer of multiple graded stakes winners Silverfoot and Macho Again. Stewart won his first stakes at storied Saratoga Race Course when Macho Again won the 2008 Jim Dandy Stakes.

In the 2013 Kentucky Derby Dallas Stewart's horse, a colt named Golden Soul, finished second to Orb. Golden Soul's odds were 50–1, and he was one of five colts at those odds, the other four being Falling Sky, Frac Daddy, Vyjack, and Giant Finish. In the 2014 Kentucky Derby, a Dallas Stewart trainee once again finished second; 37-1 Commanding Curve. Commanding Curve retired from racing in 2016, and is now in training with Olympic equestrian Phillip Dutton.

In 2016, Saint's Fan, a chestnut colt that Stewart bred, trains, and owns himself, won the $100,000 Louisiana Champions Day Juvenile Stakes at Fair Grounds Race Course. Another trainee, Tom's Ready, won the 2016 Gr.II Woody Stephens Stakes and Gr.III Ack Ack Handicap, before finishing fifth in the Breeders' Cup Dirt Mile to Tamarkuz.
