= Sandford Prince =

British-bred Thoroughbred racehorse

- Sire: Tap On Wood
- Grandsire: Sallust
- Dam: Sanford Lady
- Damsire: Will Somers
- Sex: Stallion
- Foaled: 1985
- Country: Great Britain
- Colour: Chestnut
- Breeder: Whitsbury Manor Stud
- Owner: Sir David Seale
- Record: 21: 10-7-3
- Earnings: US$137,090

Major wins
- Cave Shepherd '5000' (1991); Barbados Gold Cup (1989, 1991, 1992)

Awards
- Barbadian Horse of the Year (1992)

Sanford Prince (foaled 1985 in Great Britain) was a Barbadian thoroughbred racehorse that was the first horse to win three editions of the Barbados Gold Cup.

Trained by Australian Racing Hall of Fame inductee, Scobie Breasley for owner Sir David Seale, he was ridden to victory in each of his three Gold Cups by jockey, Venice Richards.
