= Will Take Charge =

American Thoroughbred racehorse

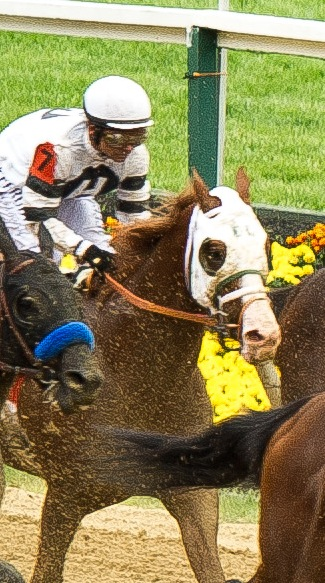
- Will Take Charge at the 2013 Preakness Stakes
- Sire: Unbridled's Song
- Grandsire: Unbridled
- Dam: Take Charge Lady
- Damsire: Dehere
- Sex: Stallion
- Foaled: 13 April 2010
- Country: United States
- Colour: Chestnut
- Breeder: Eaton Sales
- Owner: Willis D. Horton
- Trainer: D. Wayne Lukas
- Record: 21:7–6–1
- Earnings: $3,924,648

Major wins
- Rebel Stakes (2013); Travers Stakes (2013); Pennsylvania Derby (2013); Clark Handicap (2013); Oaklawn Handicap (2014)

Awards
- American Champion Three-Year-Old Male Horse (2013)

Will Take Charge (foaled April 13, 2010) is a retired American Thoroughbred racehorse. Trained by D. Wayne Lukas, the horse is best known for his wins in the 2013 Travers Stakes and Clark Handicap and for being beaten by a nose in the 2013 Breeders' Cup Classic. He was named American Champion Three-Year-Old Male Horse for 2013. He was retired in September, 2014, and stands at stud at Three Chimneys Farm.

== Background ==
Will Take Charge is a chestnut colt with a broad white blaze and three high white stockings who stands over 17 hands (68 inches, 173 cm), making him an unusually large Thoroughbred. He was sired by the Breeders' Cup Juvenile winner Unbridled's Song, whose other major winners included the sprinter Zensational and the Breeders' Cup winners Unrivaled Belle, Unbridled Elaine, and Arrogate. Will Take Charge's dam, Take Charge Lady, was a top-class race mare whose wins included the Ashland Stakes and successive runnings of the Spinster Stakes. She is also the dam of the Florida Derby winner Take Charge Indy.

In September 2011, the yearling was consigned by the Hill 'n' Dale Sales Agency to the Keeneland sales where he was bought for $425,000 by Willis D. Horton. of Three Chimneys Farm. The colt was sent into training with the veteran D. Wayne Lukas.

== Racing career ==
=== 2012: two-year-old season ===
Will Take Charge was ridden in all his 2012 races by Jon Court. He began his racing career by finishing fifth in a five and a half furlong maiden race at Saratoga Race Course on August 16, 2012. After a break of two months, he reappeared in a seven-furlong maiden at Keeneland and recorded his first success, coming from well off the pace with a strong run on the wide outside to win by a length from Hard Aces. The colt was then moved up in class for the Grade II Kentucky Jockey Club Stakes at Churchill Downs in November and finished last of the thirteen runners. On his final appearance of the year, he finished second to Texas Bling in the Springboard Mile at Remington Park.

=== 2013: three-year-old season ===
In early 2013, Will Take Charge was campaigned at Oaklawn Park in Arkansas. On January 21, he produced a "spirited drive" to reverse his previous defeat by Texas Bling, winning by a neck in the Smarty Jones Stakes, but when moved up in class he finished unplaced behind Super Ninety Nine on a sloppy track in the Grade III Southwest Stakes. In the Grade II Rebel Stakes on March 16, he started a 28-1 outsider in a strong field which included Super Ninety Nine, Texas Bling, and the subsequent Preakness Stakes winner, Oxbow. Under Court, Will Take Charge made a strong late run to catch Oxbow in the final strides and win by a head.

The colt left Oaklawn after his win in the Rebel Stakes to contest the Triple Crown races but had little success. He finished eighth behind Orb in the Kentucky Derby, seventh behind Oxbow in the Preakness, and tenth behind Palace Malice in the Belmont Stakes. He returned after a break to contest the Jim Dandy Stakes at Saratoga on July 27. Ridden by the Venezuelan jockey Junior Alvarado, he stayed on in the straight to finish second by a length to Palace Malice, two and a quarter lengths clear of Moreno, who finished third. After that race, Lukas removed the blinker hood that the horse had previously worn and changed jockeys to the "up and coming" Panamanian Luis Saez. On August 24, Will Take Charge started at odds of 9.6-1 for the Grade I Travers Stakes against a field which included Orb, Palace Malice, and Haskell Stakes winner Verrazano. He produced a strong late run to lead in the last stride and win by a nose over the front-running Moreno. Orb was third, Palace Malice was fourth, and Verrazano was seventh of the nine runners. Lukas, winning the race for the third time, said that Will Take Charge was "just starting to find himself. This is a horse who's going to get better. He's getting his act together." Claims by the trainer of Moreno that Saez had used an illegal "electrical device" to encourage the horse were rejected after a lengthy investigation by the New York State Gaming Commission, which stated that the complaint was "wholly unsubstantiated."

Will Take Charge faced Moreno again in the Pennsylvania Derby over nine furlongs at Parx on September 21. He conceded two pounds to his main rival and improved on his Travers performance, beating Moreno by two and a quarter lengths. On November 2, Will Take Charge started at odds of 13-1 for the Breeders' Cup Classic in a strong field which included Game On Dude (the favorite), Paynter, Palace Malice, Mucho Macho Man, Fort Larned, and Flat Out as well as the European challenger Declaration of War. Ridden by Saez, Will Take Charge settled behind the leaders before rallying on the outside in the straight. He failed by a nose to catch Mucho Macho Man, with Declaration of War a head away in third place. On November 29, he started the 12-5 second favorite behind Game On Dude in the Clark Handicap over nine furlongs at Churchill Downs. Settled in midfield by Saez, he produced a sustained run in the straight to catch Game On Dude in the final strides and won by a head.

He finished the year as the number two-ranked horse in purse wins in the US behind Mucho Macho Man and ahead of Game on Dude and Orb. In late December, Willis Horton announced that he had sold a 50% share in the horse to Three Chimneys Farm, with an agreement that Will Take Charge would remain in training with Lukas for the 2014 season. After that, it was anticipated that he would be retired to stud. In January 2014, Will Take Charge was named Champion Three-Year-Old Male Horse at the Eclipse Awards, taking 231 of the 247 votes: he also finished third to Wise Dan and Mucho Macho Man in the poll for American Horse of the Year.

=== 2014: four-year-old season ===
Will Take Charge hit the board in five of his six starts in 2014. began his third season in the Grade I Donn Handicap at Gulfstream Park on 9 February. Carrying top weight of 123 pounds, he started the 6/4 favourite, but although he made progress he was late beginning his trademark move from the back and was beaten one and a half lengths by the five-year-old Lea. In his next start, he contested top-class horses in the Grade 1 Santa Anita Handicap at Santa Anita Park. He stalked the leaders in third and passed Blingo rounding the final turn but could not get past Game on Dude, who won by 1 3/4 lengths. On 15 June, Will Take Charge started favourite for the Stephen Foster Handicap at Churchill Downs and finished second to the six-year-old Moonshine Mullin, to whom he was conceding five pounds. On August 2, the colt started the 4.1/1 second favourite for the Whitney Handicap at Saratoga in which he carried 124 pounds (equal highweight with Palace Malice). He stayed on steadily in the straight but was unable to reach the leaders and finished third of the nine runners behind wire-to-wire winner Moreno. On September 21, 2014, following a "mild strain to a branch of his suspensory apparatus", he was retired to stud, his connections deciding that his value at stud justified retirement over further racing.

== Retirement and stud career ==
Will Take Charge entered the stud farm at Three Chimneys Farm in 2015.

In 2020 and 2021 Will Take Charge stood at Haras Phillipson in Uruguay. Will Take Charge sired a South American champion in Esidio, who was named champion older horse and champion stayer in Peru for 2020. In 2022, Will Take Charge stood at Three Chimneys Farm for $5,000.

In November 2022, Will Take Charge was moved to Japan to stand stud at Darley Japan Farm. As of 2024, he is standing at Darley Japan Farm for 1.2 million yen.

=== Notable progeny ===
'c = colt, f = filly, g = gelding

Foaled	Name	Sex	Major Wins
2018	There Goes Harvard	c	Hollywood Gold Cup

== Pedigree ==
Pedigree of Will Take Charge (USA), chestnut, 2010
Sire Unbridled's Song (USA) 1993	Unbridled (USA); 1987	Fappiano	Mr. Prospector
Sire Unbridled's Song (USA) 1993	Unbridled (USA); 1987	Fappiano	Killaloe
Sire Unbridled's Song (USA) 1993	Unbridled (USA); 1987	Gana Facil	Le Fabuleux
Sire Unbridled's Song (USA) 1993	Unbridled (USA); 1987	Gana Facil	Charedi
Sire Unbridled's Song (USA) 1993	Trolley Song (USA); 1983	Caro	Fortino
Sire Unbridled's Song (USA) 1993	Trolley Song (USA); 1983	Caro	Chambord
Sire Unbridled's Song (USA) 1993	Trolley Song (USA); 1983	Lucky Spell	Lucky Mel
Sire Unbridled's Song (USA) 1993	Trolley Song (USA); 1983	Lucky Spell	Incantation
Dam Take Charge Lady (USA) 1999	Dehere (USA); 1991	Deputy Minister	Vice Regent
Dam Take Charge Lady (USA) 1999	Dehere (USA); 1991	Deputy Minister	Mint Copy
Dam Take Charge Lady (USA) 1999	Dehere (USA); 1991	Sister Dot	Secretariat
Dam Take Charge Lady (USA) 1999	Dehere (USA); 1991	Sister Dot	Sword Game
Dam Take Charge Lady (USA) 1999	Felicita (USA); 1994	Rubiano	Fappiano
Dam Take Charge Lady (USA) 1999	Felicita (USA); 1994	Rubiano	Ruby Slippers
Dam Take Charge Lady (USA) 1999	Felicita (USA); 1994	Grand Bonheur	Blushing Groom
Dam Take Charge Lady (USA) 1999	Felicita (USA); 1994	Grand Bonheur	Director (Family 22-c)
