= Scobie Breasley =

Australian jockey and horse trainer

- Scobie Breasley

Personal information
- Born: 7 May 1914 Wagga Wagga, New South Wales, Australia
- Died: 21 December 2006 (aged 92) Clayton, Victoria, Australia
- Occupation: Jockey

Horse racing career
- Sport: Horse racing
- Career wins: 3,251

Major racing wins
- AJC Metropolitan (1930); Cantala Stakes (1934, 1946); Toorak Handicap (1935, 1947); Adelaide Cup (1937, 1948); Chipping Norton Stakes (1938, 1949); Oakleigh Plate (1941, 1946); Caulfield Cup (1942, 1943, 1944, 1945, 1952); VRC Oaks (1943, 1945, 1949); Caulfield Guineas (1944, 1945, 1948); Cox Plate (1944); Mackinnon Stakes (1944); VRC Derby (1944, 1952); Caulfield Stakes (1944, 1952); Goodwood Handicap (1946); AJC Derby (1948); All Aged Stakes (1949); AJC Plate (1949); Sydney Cup (1949); Brisbane Cup (1949); Epsom Handicap (1949); International race wins: 2,000 Guineas (1951); 1,000 Guineas (1954); Middle Park Stakes (1956, 1960); Dewhurst Stakes (1957); Coronation Cup (1958, 1965); Eclipse Stakes (1958); George VI And Elizabeth II Stakes (1958); Prix de l'Arc de Triomphe (1958); Yorkshire Oaks (1961); Epsom Derby (1964, 1966); Sussex Stakes (1967); Champion Stakes (1967); As a trainer: Irish Derby (1972); Flying Childers Stakes (1975); Middle Park Stakes (1975); Barbados Gold Cup (1989, 1991, 1992, 1993)

Racing awards
- British flat racing Champion Jockey (1957, 1961, 1962, 1963)

Honours
- Australian Racing Hall of Fame (2000); Scobie Breasley Medal awarded by Racing Victoria; Australian Racing Hall of Fame "Legend" (2009)

Significant horses
- Ki Ming, Festoon, Ballymoss, Santa Claus, Charlottown, Reform, Sandford Prince
- Updated on 25 June 2007

Arthur Edward "Scobie" Breasley (7 May 1914 – 21 December 2006) was an Australian jockey. He won the Caulfield Cup in Melbourne five times: 1942-45 consecutively on Tranquil Star, Skipton, Counsel and St Fairy; then on Peshawar in 1952. He also won The Derby twice, and the Prix de l'Arc de Triomphe once.

== Early life ==
Breasley was born in 1914 in Wagga Wagga, New South Wales and was christened Arthur Edward, but while still very young was given the nickname "Scobie", after the famous Australian trainer and jockey James Scobie.

== Career ==
Breasley rode 3,251 winners during his career, including over 1,000 in Australia and 2,161 in Britain. He rode over 100 winners in Great Britain every year from 1955 to 1964, and was Champion Jockey in 1957 and continuously from 1961 to 1963. He won the Prix de l'Arc de Triomphe for the only time on Ballymoss in 1958, and the Derby for the first time at the age of 50 on Santa Claus in 1964, then again on Charlottown in 1966, aged 52.

He developed a great rivalry with Sir Gordon Richards, and later with the younger jockey Lester Piggott. He was renowned for his exquisite balance in the saddle, for refusing to race wide, and for his sparing use of the whip, preferring to use hands and heels.

=== Retirement ===
Breasley retired as a jockey in 1968 and took up training in Epsom (UK), France, the United States, and Barbados, where he and his wife owned a holiday home. He retired from training horses after winning the most prestigious race in Barbados - the Gold Cup - on four occasions in the early 1990s and returned to live in Melbourne.

Racing authorities in the state of Victoria struck a medal in his honour, awarded annually since 1996 to the best jockey in the state. On its formation, Scobie Breasley was the first person inducted into the Australian Racing Hall of Fame. In 1999, the Racing Post ranked Breasley as tenth in their list of the Top 50 jockeys of the 20th century.

== Death ==
Scobie Breasley died on 21 December 2006 after suffering a stroke a few days earlier.
