= Barbados Gold Cup =

Sandy Lane Barbados Gold Cup
- Class: Group I
- Location: Garrison Savannah Racetrack; Bridgetown, Barbados
- Inaugurated: 1982
- Race type: Thoroughbred - Flat racing
- Website: barbadosturfclub.com

Race information
- Distance: 1800 metres (8.95 furlongs)
- Surface: Turf
- Track: Right-handed
- Qualification: Three-year-olds & up
- Weight: Assigned
- Purse: Bds$200,000

The Sandy Lane Gold Cup is a Barbadian Group I Thoroughbred horse race run annually in late February/early March since 1982 at the Garrison Savannah Racetrack in Bridgetown, Barbados. Contested over a turf course at a distance of 1,800 meters (8.95 furlongs), it is open to horses, age three or older.

The most important event on the Barbados horse racing calendar, it was inaugurated in 1982 with the intention of attracting the top horses from Caribbean countries. Since 1997 the race has been sponsored by the Sandy Lane Hotel.

In 1999, nineteen-year-old Attie S. Joseph III became the youngest owner to win the Gold Cup.

In 2007, Elizabeth Deane became the first female trainer to saddle a winner of the Barbados Gold Cup.

The race was not run in 2021 and 2022 due to the COVID-19 pandemic, but returned in March 2023. The 2023 edition was won by It's a Gamble, a son of English Channel, and jockey Jalon Samuel, who furthered his record wins to six. Antonio Bishop guided Portfolio Company to his second Gold Cup victory in the 2024 edition of the race.

== Records ==
Speed record:

- 1:48.40 - Sterwins (2010)

Most wins:

- 3 - Sandford Prince (1989, 1991, 1992)
- 3 - Blast of Storm (2000, 2001, 2002)
- 2 - Dorsett (2016, 2017)

Most wins by an owner:

- 8 - Sir David Seale (1986, 1989, 1991, 1992, 1993, 2012, 2013, 2020)

Most wins by a jockey:

- 7 - Jalon Samuel (2012, 2016, 2017, 2018, 2020, 2023, 2026)
- 4 - Venice Richards (1986, 1989, 1991, 1992)
- 4 - Jono Jones (2000, 2001, 2002, 2003)
- 4 - Patrick Husbands (1990, 2006, 2010, 2014)

Most wins by a trainer:

- 7 - William C. Marshall (1984, 1994, 1995, 2000, 2001, 2002, 2003)

== Winners of the Barbados Gold Cup ==
Year	Winner	Age	Jockey	Trainer	Owner	Time
2026	Public Sector	8	Jalon Samuel	Romell Lovell	Melrose Racing and Mrs Morgan Joseph	1:51.6
2025	Harrow	7	Rasheed Hughes	Saffie Joseph Jr	Averill Racing LLC and One Guyana Racing	1:55.6
2024	Portfolio Company	5	Antonio Bishop	Chad Brown	Gay Smith	1:49.60
2023	It's a Gamble	5	Jalon Samuel	Romell Lovell	Mark Goodridge	1:50.20
2022	RACE NOT RUN					
2021	RACE NOT RUN					
2020	Night Prowler	8	Jalon Samuel	Elizabeth Deane	Sir David Seale	
2019	Celestial Storm	4	Rasheed Hughes	Roger Parravicino	C.N Parravicino	
2018	Sir Dudley Digges	6	Jalon Samuel	Michael J. Maker	Kenneth and Sarah Ramsey	
2017	Dorsett	7	Jalon Samuel	Robert Pierce	Steve and Allan Madoo	1:54.30
2016	Dorsett	6	Jalon Samuel	Robert Pierce	Steve and Allan Madoo	1:49.20
2015	Sayler's Creek	5	Rico Walcott	Michael J. Maker	Kenneth and Sarah Ramsey	1:53.40
2014	Major Marvel	8	Patrick Husbands BSS	Michael J. Maker	Kenneth and Sarah Ramsey	1:49.20
2013	Aristodemus	4	A. Trotman	E. Deane SCM	Sir David Seale	1:50.20
2012	Dancin David	5	Jalon Samuel	E. Deane SCM	Sir David Seale	2:02.60
2011	Zoom	6	Antonio Bishop	Edward Walcott Jr	Gay Smith	1:49.40
2010	Sterwins	7	Patrick Husbands BSS	Mark E. Casse	Eugene Melnyk	1:48.40
2009	Daylight Express	4	Anderson Ward	Robert Peirce	Michael Taylor	1:51.40
2008	Pure Temptation	4	Anderson Ward	William Clarke	Michael Taylor	1:50.40
2007	Whiskey For Me	5	Rickey Walcott	Elizabeth Deane	Aysha Syndicate	1:50.20
2006	Sharp Impact	6	Patrick Husbands	Robert Peirce	Gay Smith	1:50.60
2005	Feet On Flames	6	Anderson Trotman	Clayton Greenidge	Luther G. Miller III	1:50.20
2004	Kathir	7	Slade Callaghan	Nazih Issa	E.& L. Melnyk	1:53.73
2003	Thady Quill	6	Jono Jones	William C. Marshall	Gay Smith	1:48.60
2002	Blast of Storm	5	Jono Jones	William C. Marshall	Sally Arbib	1:48.60
2001	Blast of Storm	5	Jono Jones	William C. Marshall	Sally Arbib	1:48.60
2000	Blast of Storm	4	Jono Jones	William C. Marshall	Sally Arbib	1:49.20
1999	Peace Envoy	7	Anderson Ward	R. Deane	Attie S. Joseph III	1:49.20
1998	Federico	5	Simon Husbands	Challenor Jones	Richard Edwards	1:51.60
1997	Incitatus	4	Dale Whittaker	Challenor Jones	Blair Down	1:49.80
1996	Rambrino	4	Chris Griffith	Sean Hall	Robert Sangster	1:50.00
1995	Asian Jane	4	Richard Quinn	William C. Marshall	Paul H. Locke	1:50.60
1994	Alto Jane	5	Richard Quinn	William C. Marshall	Paul H. Locke	1:49.60
1993	Chou Chou Royale	6	Sandy Hawley	Scobie Breasley	Sir David Seale	1:52.60
1992	Sandford Prince	7	Venice Richards	Scobie Breasley	Sir David Seale	1:49.20
1991	Sandford Prince	6	Venice Richards	Scobie Breasley	Sir David Seale	1:50.20
1990	Vardar	3	Patrick Husbands	Challenor Jones	Sylvie Beuzelin	1:50.40
1989	Sandford Prince	4	Venice Richards	Scobie Breasley	Sir David Seale	1:51.00
1988	Call To Account	nf	Emile Ramsammy	V. Roberts	Roland I. Khan	1:49.80
1987	Stangrave Park	4	Emile Ramsammy	G. Edghill	W. Greenidge	1:50.80
1986	Bentom	4	Venice Richards	Ronald G. Burke	Sir David Seale	1:50.80
1985	Frisky Wharf	4	Emile Ramsammy	Joseph Hadeed	George Bros. Stables	1:50.60
1984	Tinkers Image	4	Ricky Griffith	William C. Marshall	Mrs. Gill Wilson	1:50.80
1983	Iron Lover	4	Bryn Crossley	Guy Cottrell	Laurent Cottrell	1:54.00
1982	Bold Lewis	6	Declan Gillespie	Cyril Arneaud	J. E. Camacho	1:52.80
