= Charles E. Fipke =

Canadian geologist and prospector

Charles E. Fipke CM
- Born: 1946 (age 79–80); Edmonton, Alberta, Canada
- Citizenship: Canada
- Education: University of British Columbia (BSc.)
- Occupations: Scientist and entrepreneur
- Known for: Discovered Ekati Diamond Mine

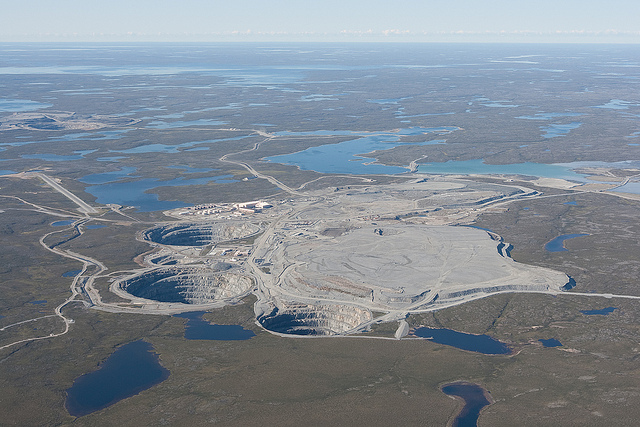
Ekati Diamond Mine, 2010. Fipke is credited as a co-discoverer of the mine, and retained a 10% interest until 2014, which made him a very wealthy man.

Charles Edgar "Chuck" Fipke CM (born 1946) is a Canadian geologist and prospector who discovered the existence of diamonds around Lac de Gras in Canada's Northwest Territories. He is now a multimillionaire involved in geological explorations around the world. Fipke is also a prominent owner and breeder in North American thoroughbred horse racing.

== Background ==
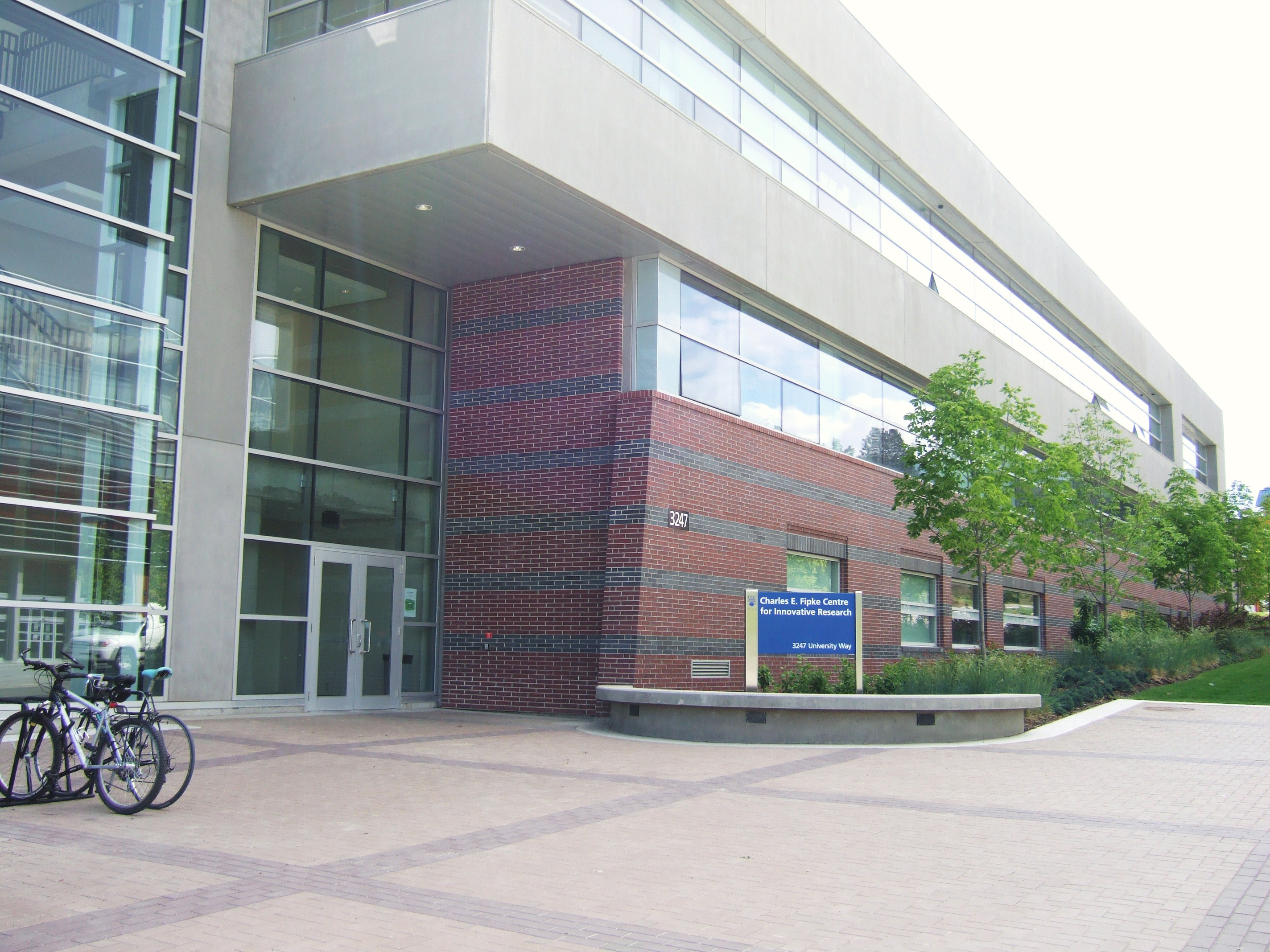
Charles E. Fipke Centre for Innovative Research at University of British Columbia's Okanagan campus.

Fipke was born in Edmonton, Alberta. Growing up, he was sometimes assumed to be stupid because of his "frantic stop-start mind". His nicknames include Captain Chaos and Stumpy. He occasionally stammers and is known for his use of the word "hey" at the end of sentences.

In 1970, he graduated from University of British Columbia (UBC) with a bachelor of science degree in geology. Fipke received an honorary doctorate from Okanagan University College in 1998.

In 2006, Fipke donated CA$6,000,000 to UBC to support the creation of the Charles Fipke Centre for Innovative Research. In 2012, the Fipke Laboratory for Trace Element Research (FiLTER) opened, with Fipke funding the purchase of imaging equipment including a scanning electron microscope. "To graduate excellent scientists, a university needs to have the best technology available," said Fipke. "My goal is to help UBC's Okanagan campus reach the leading edges of science, in order to recruit the top students and faculty from around the world." Fipke has also donated substantially to Alzheimer's research at UBC.

Fipke was divorced by his wife Marlene (née Pyett) in 2000, who had been with him since he began searching for the diamonds. At the time, the divorce settlement was the largest in Canadian history, with her portion of the assets estimated to be approximately CA$123,100,000.

== Career ==
Upon graduation, Fipke worked for companies such as Kennecott Copper and Cominco, performing mineral explorations in locations such as Papua New Guinea, South Africa and Brazil. He became an expert in the study of indicator minerals to identify potential strikes, the key to his later success. "Everyone now knows that G-10 garnets with low calcium might lead you to diamonds, hey," he said in 2011. "But how do you distinguish between a group 1 eclogitic garnet that grew with a diamond and a group 2 eclogitic garnet that didn't? They look the same." Fipke uses custom software to help determine the difference. "No one else out there can distinguish between these similar tiny particles of minerals that grow with a diamond and ones that don't."

In 1977, Fipke founded CF Mineral Research, a heavy mineral and diamond exploration research laboratory. In 1983, he founded Dia Met Minerals, which became listed on the Vancouver Stock Exchange in 1984. Dia Met was sold to BHP Billiton in 2001.

In 1988, Fipke and partner Stu Blusson began a systematic search for diamonds in the Northwest Territories, leading to the discovery of the first diamond pipe in North America in November 1991 near Lac de Gras. The Ekati Diamond Mine is now located there. Fipke maintained a 10% interest in Ekati until 2014, when he sold his share to Dominion Diamond Corp. for US$67 million. "I'm not really a miner," he said. "I'm an exploration geologist. This sale gives me more ability to do exploration."

Fipke is currently involved in multiple greenfield projects, involving searches for diamonds in Ontario with Metalex Ventures, for gold in the Yukon, Nevada and Yemen with Cantex Mine Development and for uranium along the Manitoba–Saskatchewan border with Northern Uranium.

== Horse racing ==
Fipke bought his first thoroughbred racehorse in 1981 and has subsequently become a significant owner and breeder. His major winners include:

- Forever Unbridled, winner of the 2017 Breeders' Cup Distaff, multiple graded-stakes winner and daughter of Lemons Forever
- Perfect Soul, winner of the 2003 Shadwell Turf Mile
- Tale of Ekati, named for his diamond mine, winner of the Grade I Wood Memorial and Cigar Mile in 2008
- Not Bourbon, winner of the 2008 Queen's Plate
- Seeking the Soul, winner of the 2017 Clark Handicap and track record setter for 1 1/16 miles at Keeneland
- Lemons Forever, winner of the 2006 Kentucky Oaks at odds of 47–1
- Unbridled Forever, winner of the 2015 Ballerina Stakes and full sister to Forever Unbridled
- Perfect Shirl, winner of the 2011 Breeders' Cup Filly and Mare Turf
- Jersey Town, winner of the 2012 Cigar Mile
- Java's War, winner of the 2013 Blue Grass Stakes
- Internallyflawless, winner of the 2009 Del Mar Oaks
- Kana Tape, winner of the 2025 Sekiya Kinen
- Golden Soul, a longshot in the 2013 Kentucky Derby, who finished second and had a payout more than three times higher than the winner Orb (38.60 to place vs. 12.80 to win)
- Tale of Verve, second to American Pharoah in the 2015 Preakness Stakes at odds of 28–1

Fipke owns two farms in Kentucky where he houses roughly 75 broodmares. He breeds mainly to stallions Tale of Ekati, Perfect Soul and Jersey Town.

== Honours and awards ==
Fipke has received multiple honors, including:

- The Northern Miner's Mining Man of the Year (1992)
- PDAC's Prospector of the Year (1992)
- H.H. "Spud" Huestis Award for prospecting and mineral exploration (1997)
- Daniel C. Jackling Award for contributions to technical progress in mining, geology, and geophysics (2004)
- Robert M. Dreyer Award for outstanding achievement in applied economic geology (2005)

He was inducted into the Canadian Mining Hall of Fame in 2013.

Fipke's history forms a significant portion of the "narrative broth" from which author Kathy Reichs formed the plot of the novel Bones Are Forever.
