= Barbados Triple Crown of Thoroughbred Racing =

The Barbados Triple Crown of Thoroughbred Racing is a series of thoroughbred horse races run annually at Garrison Savannah Racetrack near Bridgetown, Barbados.

The Triple Crown series consists of races of increasing distance:

- Barbados Guineas - 7.8 furlongs (0.98 mi; 1.6 km), run in mid April
- Midsummer Creole Classic - 9 furlongs (1 1/8 miles, 1.8 km), run in early July
- Barbados Derby - 10 furlongs (1 1/4 miles, 2.0 km), run in early August
