= Three Chimneys Farm =

Stud farm in Kentucky, United States

Coordinates: 38.107°N 84.661°W

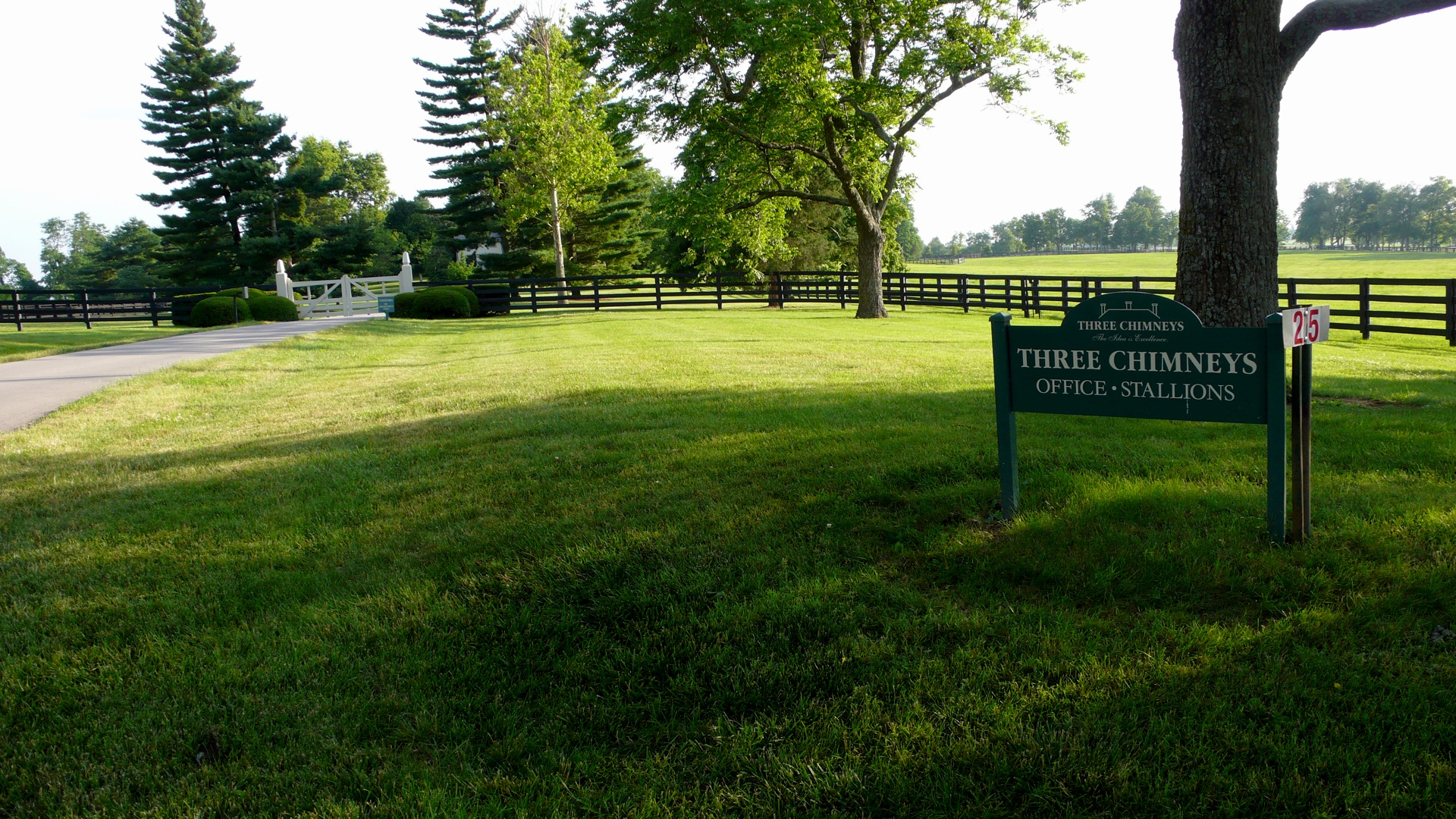
- Three Chimneys Farm entrance
- Company type: Horse breeding/Racing Stable
- Industry: Thoroughbred Horse racing
- Founded: 1972
- Headquarters: Midway, Kentucky, United States
- Key people: Goncalo Borges Torrealba, owner
- Website: www.threechimneys.com

Three Chimneys Farm is an American Thoroughbred race horse breeding farm in Midway, Kentucky, established in 1972 by Mr. & Mrs. Robert N. Clay. Three Chimneys has been home to a number of famous horses including U.S. Triple Crown champion Seattle Slew, U.S. Filly Triple Crown champion Chris Evert, as well as Silver Charm, Chief's Crown, Genuine Risk, Point Given, Slew o' Gold, Capote, Smarty Jones, and Big Brown.

In 2012, the Three Chimneys stallion roster includes Rahy, Point Given, Yes It's True, Flower Alley, Good Reward, Sky Mesa, War Chant, and Big Brown. Flower Alley sired the 2012 Kentucky Derby Winner and Preakness Stakes winner, I'll Have Another.

In April 2008, The Kentucky region of the Make-A-Wish Foundation and Three Chimneys Farm teamed up to grant a young boy's wish of meeting Kentucky Derby and Preakness Stakes winner Smarty Jones. His experience was chronicled June 30 during SportsCenter's "My Wish" series on ESPN. Nine-year-old Patrick Munro of Greenlawn, N.Y. is one of five kids from the Make-A-Wish Foundation whose sports-related wish was highlighted on the SportsCenter series. Patrick, who suffers from hydrocephalus and, as a result, is blind and hearing impaired, spent several days in Central Kentucky in April. On the first day of his visit, Munro and his family were invited to Three Chimneys Farm to fulfill the boy's wish to meet Smarty Jones.

In 2024, Lexington equestrian Tony Cissell assumed the position of the Farm's general manager and Chief operating officer after Chris Baker's resignation.

== Stallions ==
As of 2024, the following stallions are standing at Three Chimneys:

- Gun Runner, the 2017 Horse of the Year
- Funtastic
- Sky Mesa, a grade I winner and son of Pulpit
- Volatile

Other former stallions that have stood stud at Three Chimneys include:

- Palace Malice, a Belmont Stakes son of Curlin
- Sharp Azteca, a grade I winner
- Strong Mandate, a grade I winner and son of Tiznow
- Will Take Charge, Eclipse Award winner
