= Jambalaya (horse) =

Canadian-bred Thoroughbred racehorse

- Sire: Langfuhr
- Grandsire: Danzig
- Dam: Muskrat Suzie
- Damsire: Vice Regent
- Sex: Gelding
- Foaled: 2002
- Country: Canada
- Colour: Dark Bay
- Breeder: Gus Schickedanz
- Owner: Todd & Catherine D. Phillips
- Trainer: Catherine Day Phillips
- Record: 21: 8-1-7 (ongoing)
- Earnings: $1,588,214 (ongoing)

Major wins
- Breeders' Stakes(2005); Saranac Stakes (2005); Singspiel Stakes (2006); Pan American Handicap (2007); Gulfstream Park Breeders' Cup Turf Stakes (2007); Arlington Million (2007)
- Last updated on September 3, 2007

Jambalaya (foaled April 16, 2002 in Ontario) is a Canadian Thoroughbred gelding racehorse. He was sired by Langfuhr, a Canadian Horse Racing Hall of Fame inductee. Langfuhr also sired Wando, the 2003 Canadian Triple Crown Champion and Canadian Horse of the Year as well as a leading older horse in the United States in his 2007 campaign, Lawyer Ron.

== Background ==
Bred by renowned Canadian horseman Gus Schickedanz, Jambalaya was purchased by trainer Catherine Day Phillips and her husband Todd for the bargain price of $2,500 at the 2003 September Keeneland yearling sale.

== Racing career ==
Based at Toronto's Woodbine Racetrack he raced once at age two, finishing third. In 2005, during a mediocre three-year-old season racing on dirt, he was switched to turf. Jambalaya responded with a win and then in the most important grass race for Canadian-bred horses, the Breeders' Stakes, he ran away from the field, winning by eight lengths. Sent to run at Saratoga Race Course he won again on turf, capturing the Saranac Handicap.

Racing in 2006 at age four, Jambalaya won the 1½ mile Singspiel Stakes at Woodbine Racetrack and had two third-place finishes in Grade II races and was second to Better Talk Now in the Sky Classic Stakes.

At age five, Jambalaya is one of the leading turf horses in North America, winning the 2007 Grade I Gulfstream Park Breeders' Cup Turf Stakes and defeated The Tin Man to win the Arlington Million. Jambalaya's win in the Million was the first by a Canadian-bred horse and the victory guaranteed him a start in the 2007 Breeders' Cup Turf.

In mid September, the horse's handlers announced that Jambalaya's 2007 racing campaign was over following an MRI that revealed an acute bone bruise at the end of a cannon bone. Because it was caught early, the gelding is expected to recover fully in time to compete in 2008.
