= Garrison Savannah Racetrack =

Horse racing venue in Bridgetown, Barbados

Coordinates: 13.080733°N 59.604639°W

The Garrison Savannah in the country of Barbados, is a horse racing venue located within the Garrison Historic Area, just outside the capital-city Bridgetown. A clockwise grass course, the Garrison Savannah is known internationally for the annual Barbados Gold Cup for Thoroughbreds which takes place on the six-furlong track around the perimeter of the green.

The racetrack also is host to the annual Barbados Triple Crown of Thoroughbred Racing series.

Racing has taken place at the location since the days that a British garrison was stationed there.

In 2012 a network of subterranean tunnels were found to exist below the area.

== Gallery ==
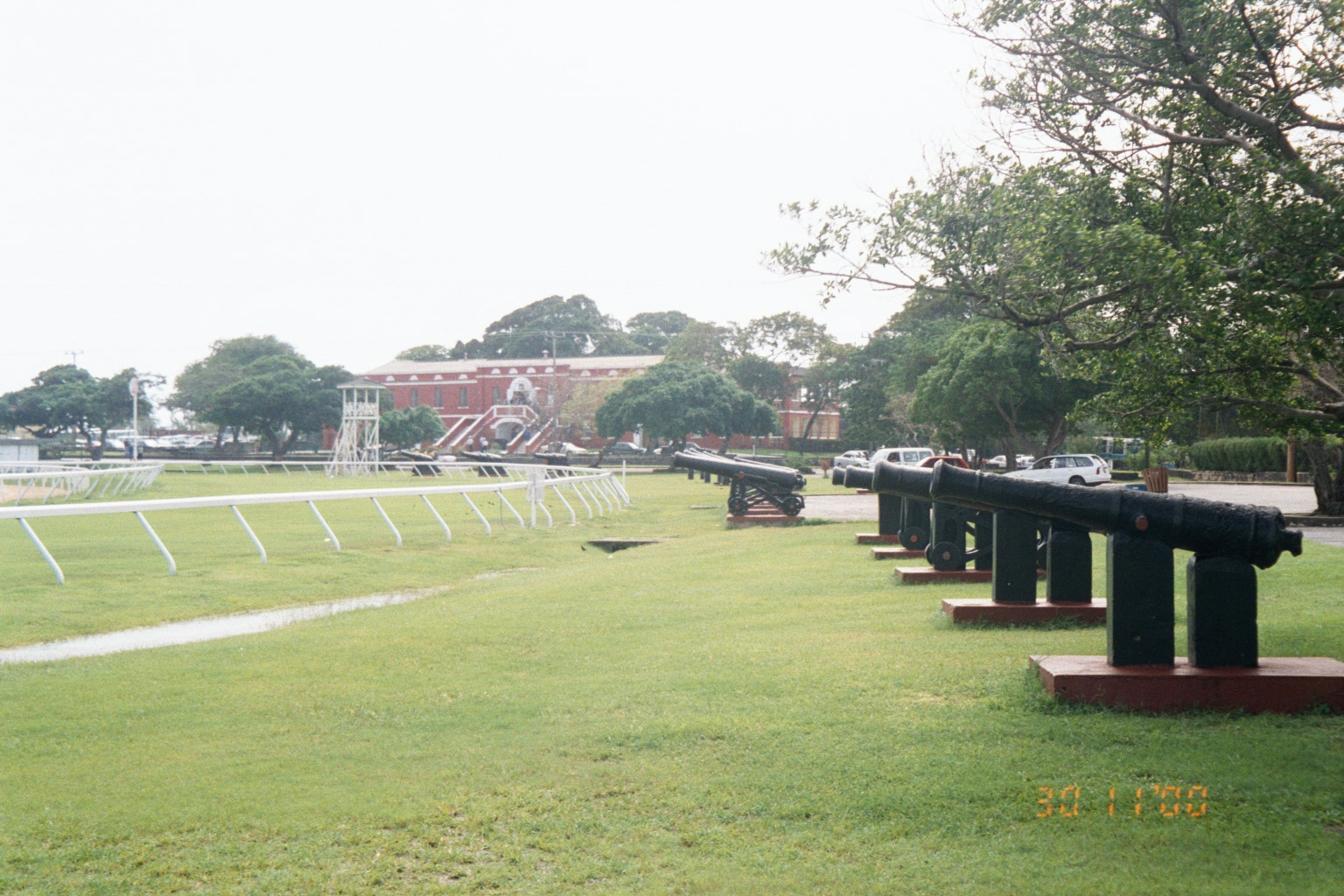
Display of some of the oldest and most rare English cannons in the West Indies at the Savannah

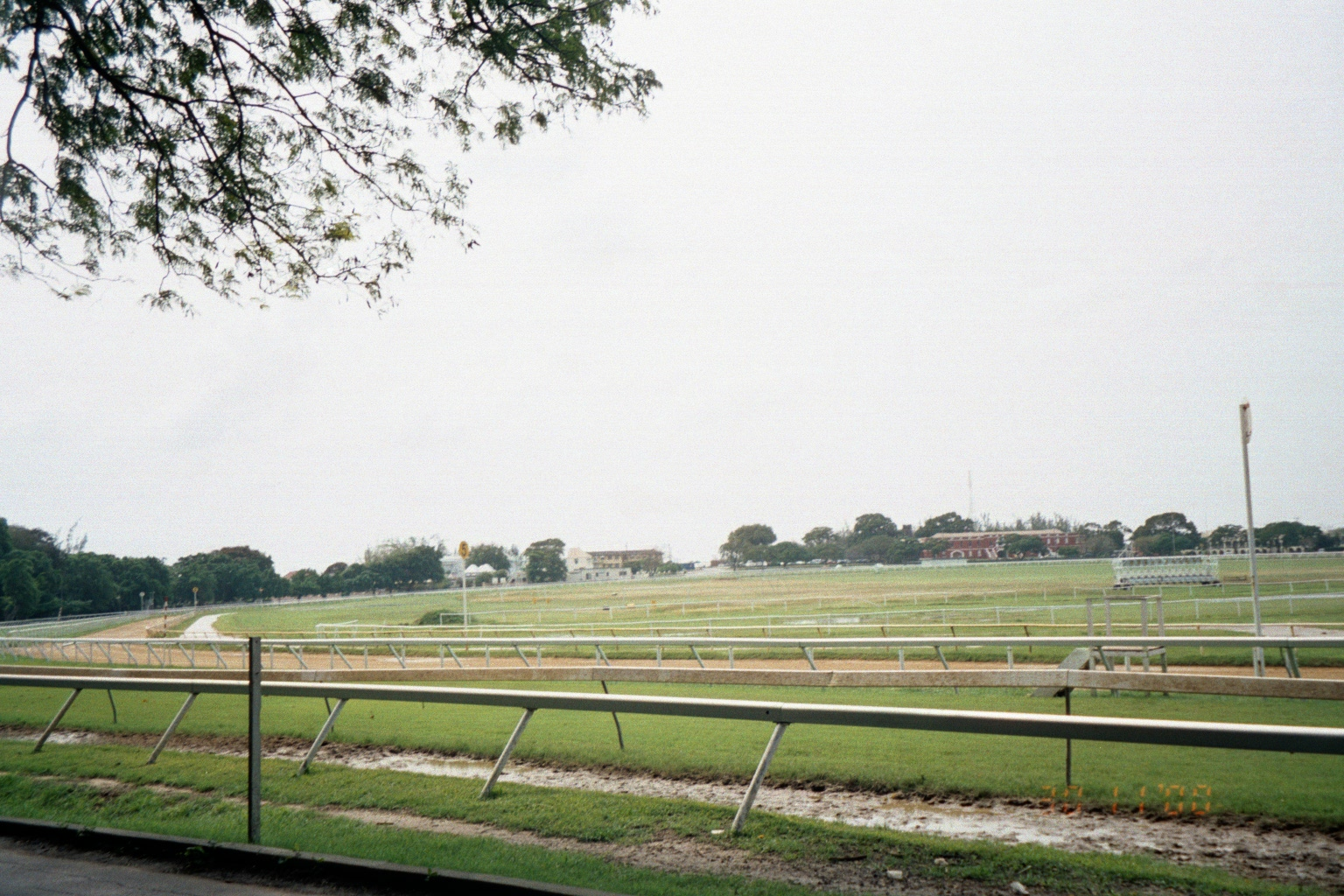
Part of the track at the Savannah

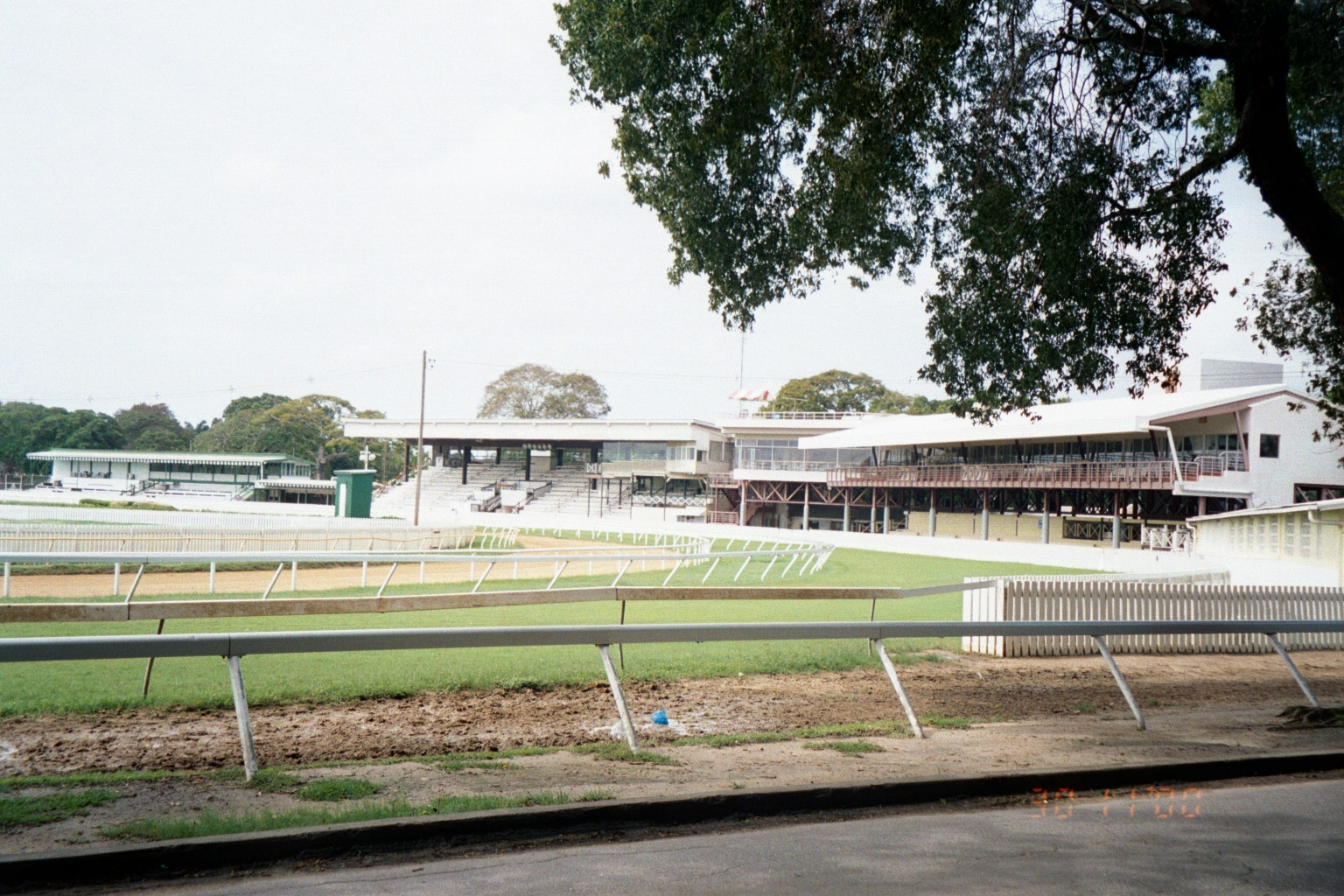
The stands at the St. Ann's Garrison Savannah racetrack

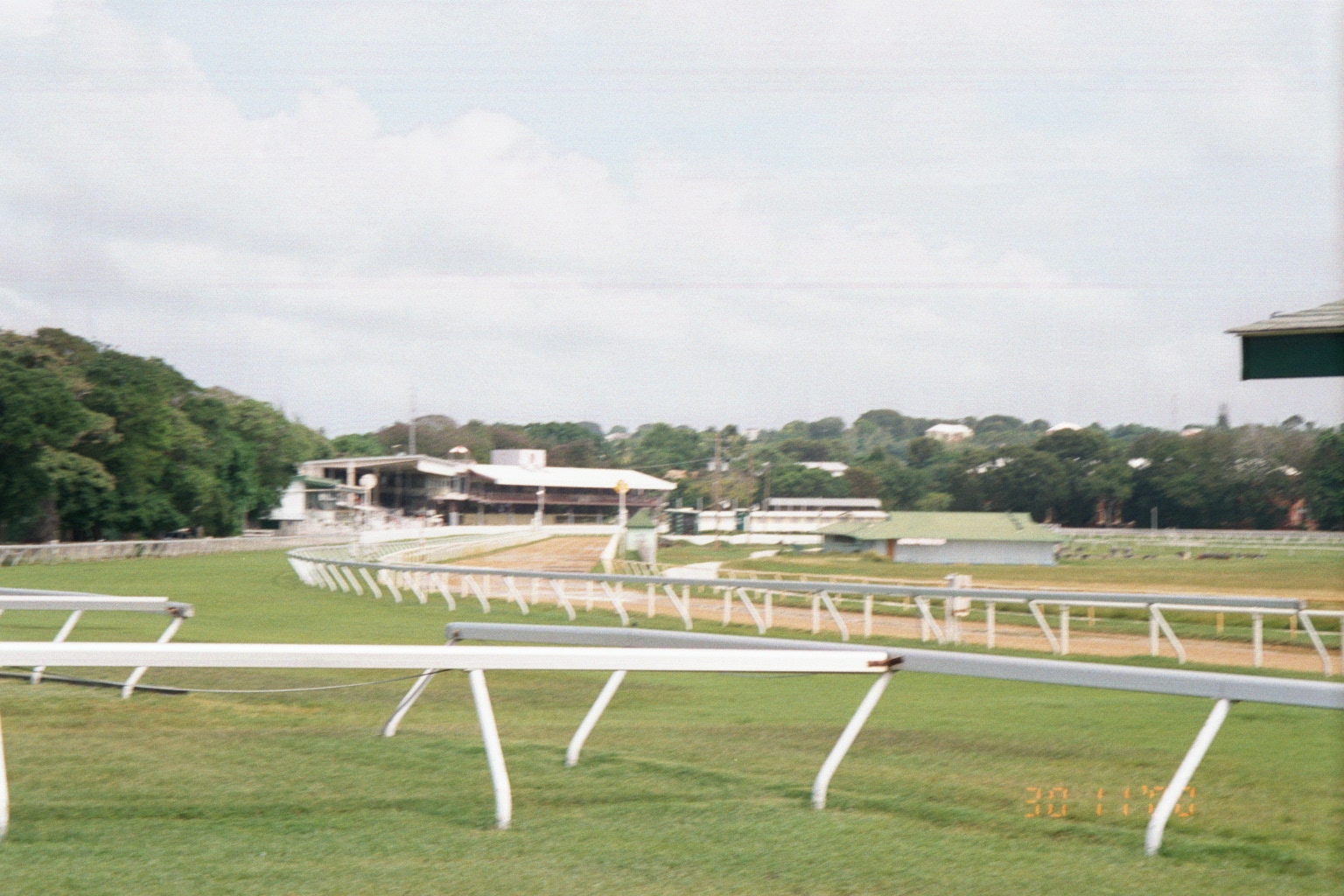
The stands at the St. Ann's Garrison Savannah racetrack

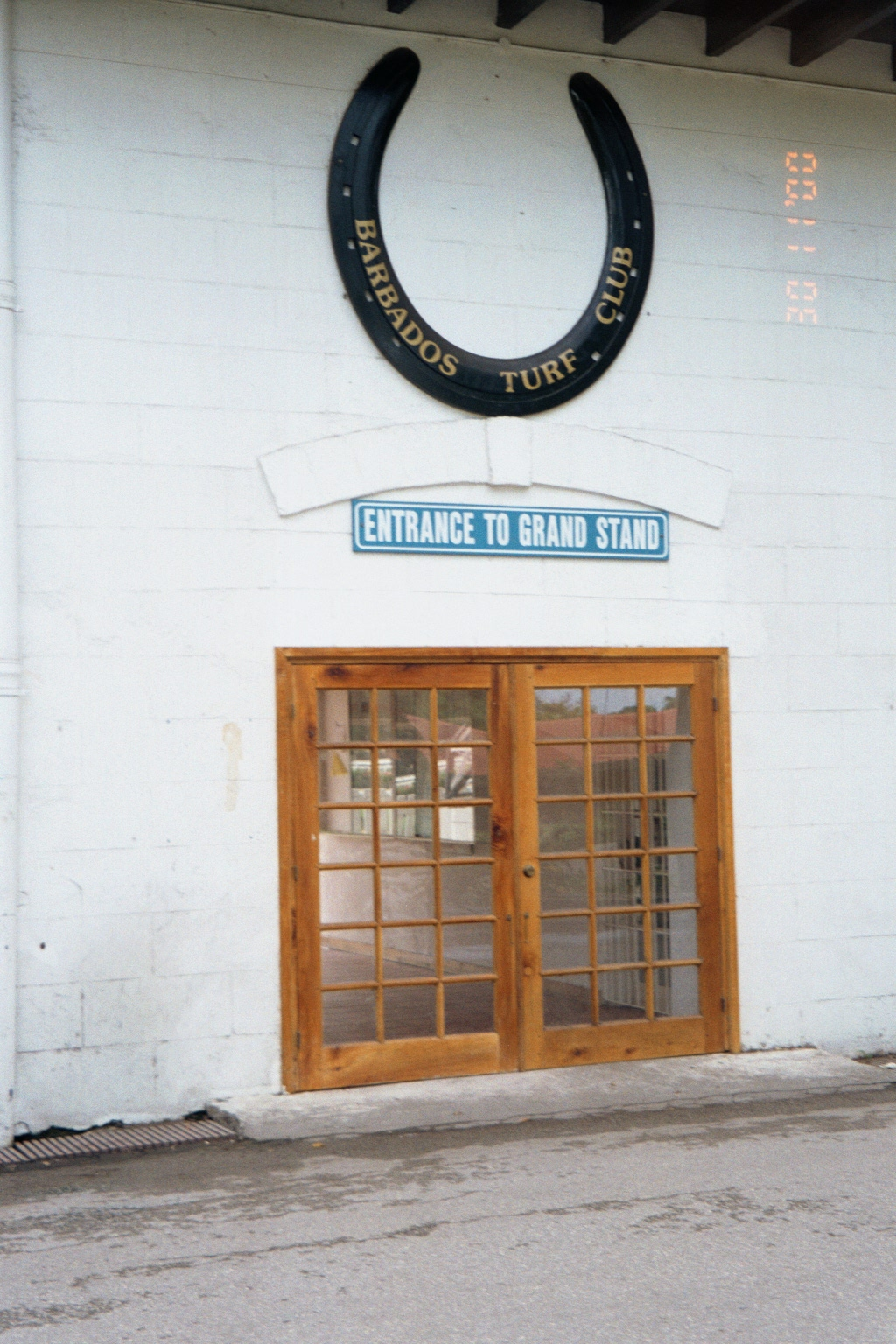
The Barbados Turf Club's entrance to the Garrison Savannah racetrack stands

== See also ==
- Sport in Barbados
