= Dehere =

American-bred Thoroughbred racehorse

- Sire: Deputy Minister
- Grandsire: Vice Regent
- Dam: Sister Dot
- Damsire: Secretariat
- Sex: Stallion
- Foaled: 1991
- Country: United States
- Colour: Bay
- Breeder: Due Process Stable
- Owner: Due Process Stable
- Trainer: Reynaldo Nobles
- Record: 9: 6-2-0
- Earnings: $723,712

Major wins
- Sanford Stakes (1993); Hopeful Stakes (1993); Saratoga Special Stakes (1993); Champagne Stakes (1993); Fountain of Youth Stakes (1994)

Awards
- U.S. Champion 2-Year-Old-Colt (1993)

Dehere (April 13, 1991 - c. May 16, 2014) was an American Champion Thoroughbred racehorse. He was bred and raced by Robert E. Brennan's Due Process Stable. Sired by Canadian Hall of Fame inductee and two-time North American Champion sire, Deputy Minister, he was out of the mare Sister Dot, a daughter of the U.S. Triple Crown champion Secretariat.

Racing at age two in 1993, Dehere joined Regret (1914), Campfire (1916), and City Zip (2000) as the only horses to ever win all three Saratoga Race Course events for two-year-olds: the Saratoga Special Stakes, Sanford Stakes and Hopeful Stakes. Dehere's other major victory in 1993 came in the Grade I Champagne Stakes. He went into the Breeders' Cup Juvenile having won five of his six starts. In his only loss, he had finished second to Holy Bull in the Belmont Futurity Stakes. Breeders' Cup bettors made him a prohibitive favorite, bet down to odds of 7-10. In the race, at the three-quarter pole Dehere moved into third place but then faded and finished eighth to winner Brocco. Despite the loss, Dehere's 1993 performances earned him the Eclipse Award for Outstanding 2-Year-Old Male Horse.

Dehere raced only twice as a three-year-old, winning the Fountain of Youth Stakes. A fracture of his right hind cannon bone during training ended his racing career. Acquired by Ireland's Coolmore Stud, he was retired to breeding duty at their Ashford Stud in Versailles, Kentucky. During his five years there, he was shuttled to Coolmore breeding operations in Australia before being sold in 1999 to the Japan Bloodhorse Breeders' Association's Iburi Stallion Station in Hokkaidō, Japan. In 2005, Coolmore reacquired Dehere and he is again shuttling between Ashford Stud and Coolmore Australia.

== Notable progeny ==
c = colt, f = filly, g = gelding

Foaled	Name	Sex	Major Wins
1997	Belle De Jour	f	Golden Slipper, Newmarket Handicap
1997	Defier	g	Queen Elizabeth Stakes, George Main Stakes, Doomben Cup
1999	Bollinger	f	Coolmore Classic
1999	Take Charge Lady	f	Ashland Stakes, Spinster Stakes (twice)
2008	Invest	f	Australasian Oaks
2008	Pear Tart	f	Tattersall's Tiara
2009	Dear Demi	f	VRC Oaks
