= Omaha Beach (horse) =

American racehorse

- Sire: War Front
- Grandsire: Danzig
- Dam: Charming
- Damsire: Seeking the Gold
- Sex: stallion
- Foaled: April 24, 2016
- Country: United States
- Colour: Dark bay
- Breeder: Charming Syndicate
- Owner: Fox Hill Farms (Rick Porter)
- Trainer: Richard Mandella
- Record: 10: 5-4-1
- Earnings: $1,651,800

Major wins
- Rebel Stakes (2019); Arkansas Derby (2019); Santa Anita Sprint Championship (2019); Malibu Stakes (2019)
- Last updated on December 29, 2019

Omaha Beach (foaled April 24, 2016) is an American Thoroughbred racehorse who was the morning-line favorite for the 2019 Kentucky Derby after winning the Rebel Stakes and Arkansas Derby. However, he missed the race due to the diagnosis of an entrapped epiglottis. After a long layoff, he returned in October 2019 to win the Santa Anita Sprint Championship.

== Background ==
Omaha Beach is a dark bay stallion that was bred in Kentucky by Charming Syndicate. The syndicate owns the mare Charming, a daughter of Seeking the Gold out of Kentucky Broodmare of the Year Take Charge Lady. Charming, a half sister to Take Charge Indy and champion Will Take Charge, had previously produced champion filly Take Charge Brandi. In 2016, she foaled Omaha Beach, whose sire is War Front. War Front was a stakes winner on the dirt in America but established his reputation as a major sire with turf runners in Europe including Declaration of War, Roly Poly and U S Navy Flag.

In 2017, Omaha Beach attracted a bid of $625,000 at the Keeneland September Yearling Sale but did not meet his reserve as "he didn't vet", a reference to problems revealed by X-ray imaging. On a recommendation from trainer Larry Jones, Rick Porter had Dr. Larry Bramlage review the images. Bramlage concluded that the issue would heal up so Porter privately purchased the colt for an undisclosed price for his Fox Hill Stables. Omaha Beach is trained by Hall of Famer Richard Mandella.

== Racing career ==
=== 2018: two-year-old season ===
Omaha Beach was winless in three starts at age two, all of them run over the turf. He finished third in his first start on September 2, 2018, then second in his next start on September 29, losing the latter by a nose. In his last start on November 18, he finished second by a neck.

=== 2019: three-year-old season ===
For his first start as a three-year-old, Mandella opted to switch the colt from turf to dirt in a maiden race at Santa Anita on January 4, 2019. Omaha Beach stumbled at the start then recovered and moved to challenge for the lead. He moved into first place around the far turn but after a lengthy stretch duel again finished second, this time losing by half a length.

His next start was on February 2 over a sloppy dirt track at Santa Anita. He pressed the early pace while racing three wide, then took command around the turn. He continued to draw away down the stretch, eventually winning by nine lengths. "We always thought he was a really good horse," said Mandella later. "Being a War Front, I thought maybe he was going to want turf. But I was wrong with that. He wants dirt."

Omaha Beach entered into contention on the 2019 Road to the Kentucky Derby when he won the second division of the Rebel Stakes at Oaklawn Park on March 16. The decision to ship to the Arkansas racetrack was in part due to the temporary closure of Santa Anita due to unsafe track conditions caused by heavy winter rains. He was the second choice in a field of ten that included champion two-year-old Game Winner (Breeders' Cup Juvenile). Ridden for the first time by Hall of Fame jockey Mike Smith, he pressed the early pace then moved to the lead down the backstretch. Leading by two lengths in mid-stretch, he then held off the rapidly closing Game Winner to win by a nose despite being bumped.

"Game Winner ran really good," said Mandella. "He'll probably be tough next time, but [Omaha Beach] just broke his maiden. He might be tougher, too."

On April 13, Omaha Beach followed up by winning the Arkansas Derby, also at Oaklawn Park, moving him to second place in the Derby qualification standings. On a sloppy track, he went off as the slight favorite over the highly regarded colt Improbable (Los Alamitos Futurity). Breaking from an inside post position, Omaha Beach was outrun for the early lead, so dropped back and moved to the outside around the first turn. Down the backstretch, he moved to the lead and then held off Improbable to win by a length.

"My first thought was, 'Jeez, don't move too quick' and then I thought, 'Don't be second-guessing Mike Smith,' Mandella said. He then added, "We'd already ran in the slop at home, so that wasn't much of a concern. He's a very tractable horse. I don't think we need to pick a surface."

On April 30, the post position draw for the Kentucky Derby was held. Omaha Beach drew post position 12 and was installed as the morning-line favorite. On the same day, it was announced that he would stand at Spendthrift Farm after retirement. On May 1 however, his connections announced he would miss the Derby due to the discovery of an entrapped epiglottis, which affected his ability to breathe. Manual efforts to deal with the problem failed, meaning Omaha Beach had to undergo minor surgery, which was successfully performed on May 3.

He was originally expected to return to racing in the summer meet at Del Mar but came down with a virus. He was then being pointed to a race at Churchill Downs in late September but suffered another setback. Mandella then decided to try the colt in the Grade I Santa Anita Sprint Championship, over a distance of six furlongs. "I was thinking it may be too short," he said. "But now that I have given him a little freshener and blew him out, it may not be too short. He's just a good horse. So maybe fate has forced us into doing something a little better."

Given the lengthy layoff and Omaha Beach's lack of experience at six furlongs, he was the second betting choice in the field of six. His main rival was expected to be Shancelot (Amsterdam Stakes), who went off at odds of 3-10. Omaha Beach stumbled at the start then settled a few lengths off the early pace set by Shancelot. Around the turn, Omaha Beach started his drive, angling away from the rail for racing room. However, Shancelot swung slightly wide as they entered the stretch, leaving room for Omaha Beach to move through on the rail. Omaha Beach closed ground steadily and won by a head.

== Statistics ==
Date	Distance	Race	Grade	Track	Odds	Field	Finish	Winning Time	Winning (Losing) Margin	Jockey	Ref
2018 – two-year-old season
Sep 2, 2018	1 mile	Maiden Special Weight		Del Mar	1.00*	10	3	1:37.90	(2 lengths)	Flavien Prat	
Sep 29, 2018	1 mile	Maiden Special Weight		Santa Anita	1.30*	11	2	1:34.53	(nose)	Flavien Prat	
Nov 18, 2018	1 1/16 miles	Maiden Special Weight		Del Mar	0.90*	8	2	1:41.70	(neck)	Flavien Prat	
2019 – three-year-old season
Jan 4, 2019	1 mile	Maiden Special Weight		Santa Anita	1.10*	10	2	1:37.49	(1/2 length)	Flavien Prat	
Feb 2, 2019	7 furlongs	Maiden Special Weight		Santa Anita	0.70*	7	1	1:21.02	9 lengths	Flavien Prat	
Mar 16, 2019	1 1/16 miles	Rebel Stakes (Note: Rebel Stakes was split and run in divisions. Omaha Beach won the second division.)	II	Oaklawn Park	4.40	10	1	1:42.42	nose	Mike E. Smith	
Apr 13, 2019	1 1/8 miles	Arkansas Derby	I	Oaklawn Park	1.70*	11	1	1:49.91	1 length	Mike E. Smith	
Oct 5, 2019	6 furlongs	Santa Anita Sprint Championship	I	Santa Anita	2.60	6	1	1:08.79	head	Mike E. Smith	
Nov 2, 2019	1 mile	Breeders' Cup Dirt Mile	I	Santa Anita	1.00*	10	2	1:36.58	(2 3/4 lengths)	Mike E. Smith	
Dec 28, 2019	7 furlongs	Malibu Stakes	I	Santa Anita	0.40*	5	1	1:22.33	2 3/4 lengths	Mike E. Smith	

Legend:
Dirt Turf

Notes:
An (*) asterisk after the odds means Omaha Beach was the post-time favorite for the race.

== Stud career ==
On April 30, 2019, Spendthrift Farm announced Omaha Beach would stand the 2020 breeding season after retirement. In late 2020 Omaha Beach shuttled to Australia and stood at Spendthrift Australia for a price of AU$22,000. His fee in the United States for 2020 was $40,000.

In 2025 his stud fee was set to $35,000.

=== Notable progeny ===
c = colt, f = filly, g = gelding

Foaled	Name	Sex	Major Wins
2021	Kopion	f	La Brea Stakes, Derby City Distaff Stakes
2022	And One More Time	f	Natalma Stakes
2022	Nevada Beach	c	Goodwood Stakes

== Pedigree ==
Pedigree of Omaha Beach, dark bay colt, April 24, 2016
Sire War Front 2002	Danzig; 1977	Northern Dancer (CAN)	Nearctic
Sire War Front 2002	Danzig; 1977	Northern Dancer (CAN)	Natalma (USA)
Sire War Front 2002	Danzig; 1977	Pas de Nom	Admiral's Voyage
Sire War Front 2002	Danzig; 1977	Pas de Nom	Petitioner (GB)
Sire War Front 2002	Starry Dreamer; 1994	Rubiano	Fappiano
Sire War Front 2002	Starry Dreamer; 1994	Rubiano	Ruby Slippers
Sire War Front 2002	Starry Dreamer; 1994	Lara's Star	Forli (ARG)
Sire War Front 2002	Starry Dreamer; 1994	Lara's Star	True Reality
Dam Charming 2005	Seeking the Gold; 1985	Mr. Prospector	Raise a Native
Dam Charming 2005	Seeking the Gold; 1985	Mr. Prospector	Gold Digger
Dam Charming 2005	Seeking the Gold; 1985	Con Game	Buckpasser
Dam Charming 2005	Seeking the Gold; 1985	Con Game	Broadway
Dam Charming 2005	Take Charge Lady; 1999	Dehere	Deputy Minister (CAN)
Dam Charming 2005	Take Charge Lady; 1999	Dehere	Sister Dot
Dam Charming 2005	Take Charge Lady; 1999	Felicita	Rubiano
Dam Charming 2005	Take Charge Lady; 1999	Felicita	Grand Bonheur (family: 22-c)

Omaha Beach is inbred 3 × 4 to Rubiano, meaning Rubiano appears in the third generation of the sire's side of the pedigree and in the fourth generation of the dam's side.
