= Rubiano (horse) =

American Thoroughbred racehorse

- Sire: Fappiano
- Grandsire: Mr. Prospector
- Dam: Ruby Slippers
- Damsire: Nijinsky II
- Sex: Stallion
- Foaled: March 26, 1987; Virginia
- Died: November 19, 2002; Kentucky
- Country: United States
- Colour: Grey
- Breeder: Third Kirsmith Racing Associates
- Owner: Centennial Farms; Lane's End Farm
- Trainer: Scotty Schulhofer
- Record: 28: 13–6–1
- Earnings: $1,252,817

Major wins
- NYRA Mile (1991); Carter Handicap (1992); Vosburgh Stakes (1992); Forego Handicap (1992)

Awards
- American Champion Sprint Horse (1992); Eclipse Award

Rubiano (March 26, 1987 – November 19, 2002) was an American champion Thoroughbred racehorse and sire. Trained by Hall of Fame racehorse trainer, Scotty Schulhofer, Rubiano began his racing career as a three year old in 1990. He won three races that season and placed in several allowance races before finishing second in the G2 Jamaica Handicap, his first graded stakes appearance, although he struggled in his first G1 start in the NYRA Mile. Rubiano later established himself as a leading New York-based stakes horse in 1991. He won the G3 Westchester Handicap and earned his first G1 victory in the NYRA Mile at four.

In 1992 at five, Rubiano won the Westchester Handicap before winning the Carter Handicap, Tom Fool Stakes, and Forego Handicap. His victory in the Forego pushed his career earnings past $1 million and further cemented his reputation as one of the country's top sprinters. Later that year, he delivered another outstanding performance in the G1 Vosburgh Stakes, defeating the five other G1 winners in the race, including European champion sprinter and Breeders' Cup Sprint winner Sheikh Albadou and Breeders' Cup Juvenile winner Fly So Free. Rubiano entered the 1992 Breeders' Cup Sprint as the favorite, where he again rallied from well off the pace and finished third behind Thirty Slews and Meafara. Following the race, Rubiano was retired. He won 13 of his 28 starts, including three G1 races. (Note: Rubiano won the NYRA Mile (now the Cigar Mile), the Carter Handicap, and the Vosburgh Stakes, all of which held G1 status at the time he won them. The Forego Handicap (now the Forego Stakes), was a G2 race at the time of his victory, though it was later promoted to G1 status in 2001 and remains one as of 2026.)

His dominant 1992 season earned him the Eclipse Award for American Champion Sprint Horse.Throughout his career, Rubiano was also particularly known for his ability to close from behind with a powerful late finish. Hall of Fame jockey Julie Krone, who rode him that year, called Rubiano one of the best horses she's ever ridden. In 1993, he entered stud at Lane's End Farm in Kentucky, where he went on to achieve considerable success as a sire.

== Background ==
Rubiano was a powerful, well made, "near-white" gray (registered as roan) stallion, standing at approximately 15.3½ hands (161 centimeters tall), with a white stocking on his left leg bred by Third Kirsmith Racing Associates in Virginia, who had also owned his dam Ruby Slippers. Rubiano was known to have a bit of a fierce temperament; during races, he was described as being very competitive and having a habit of attempting to bite horses who crowded him.

He was later purchased for $650,000 at the Fasig-Tipton Saratoga Yearling Sale by Centennial Farms. His sire, Fappiano, was a successful sire and a winner of the Metropolitan Handicap and Forego Handicap in 1981. Fappiano's other notable progeny include Cryptoclearance, Unbridled, Tasso and Quiet American.

His dam, Ruby Slippers, was by the 1970 English Triple Crown winner Nijinsky. She had won 5 of her 14 starts. Through Ruby Slippers, Rubiano was also a half brother to Tap Your Heels, who's best known as the dam of Tapit.

== Racing career ==
=== 1990: three year old season ===
Rubiano did not race as a two-year-old, instead debuting as three-year-old. Rubiano won a maiden race at Gulfstream Park on January 30 by four lengths. From March 2nd to September 26, he competed in seven different allowance races, winning 2 of the races and placing second in 3 of them.

Making his graded debut on October 20th, he placed second to Confidential Talk in the G2 Jamaica Handicap at Belmont Park. Rubiano had started leading late into the race before being caught in the final strides by the undefeated horse Confidential Talk, who had won his fourth consecutive race by a neck with a time of 1:35.60. Despite being overtaken for the win, Rubiano fought to hold second place by half a length over Sunshine Jimmy, the 9-10 favorite who rallied for third after a poor start.

He then entered his first G1 race on March 11th, the NYRA Mile at Aqueduct. In the race, Quiet American stayed in third place along the backstretch, just one length behind the leader, Norquestor. Around the far turn, jockey Chris McCarron urged the horse forward. Quiet American answered instantly, catching up to Norquestor on the outside and taking the lead at the start of the final stretch. Rubiano on the other hand, wasn't able to catch up to the rest of the horses in the final stretch, falling behind to finish dead last in 12th place. Quiet American won by five lengths in 1:32.80, tying Dispersal's winning time from the year before.

=== 1991: four year old season ===
On January 14, 1991, Rubiano made his first start as a four-year-old by winning an allowance race by a length at Gulfstream Park. Next, he entered the Donn Handicap on February 9th. The undefeated Jolie’s Halo took an early lead, pulling away to win by eight lengths in 1:47.2 for his fifth consecutive victory. Rubiano showed determination in the final stretch, making a late push and rallying between horses to improve his position but finished sixth. Sports View finished second, followed by Secret Hello, while the favored Rhythm struggled throughout the race to end up eighth.

In the Listed Broward Handicap on March 2nd, the race was won by Chief Honcho, who pulled away from the field in midstretch to defeat No Marker by 4½ lengths in 1:48.10. Barkada finished third, while the multiple-stakes winner Sports View was fourth. Rubiano, however, was unable to challenge the leaders and remained well back of the top four horses, finishing sixth place again. The jockey of Chief Honcho, Mike Smith, described the race as a "picture-perfect trip," saying he had little to do other than stay aboard. Trainer Bill Mott was also pleased with Chief Honcho's performance.

Rubiano won his first graded stakes victory the following month in the G3 Westchester Handicap at Belmont Park on the 29th in 1:34.94 by 1¾ lengths. Senor Speedy, who set the early pace, finished second, while Killer Diller was third. The favorite Profit Key, who placed fourth, never challenged. He continued to face good competition throughout the spring.

In the Carter Handicap on May 4, he finished fourth behind the winner Housebuster, the last year's sprint champion. Housebuster had defeated Black Tie Affair by 2 ½ lengths in 1:21.20. Rubiano raced near the front early but faded in the final stretch, finishing fourth. Senor Speedy also weakened late and finished sixth.

Later that month, on May 27, Rubiano faced Housebuster, Black Tie Affair, and Senor Speedy again in the Metropolitan Handicap. Rubiano turned in one of the more surprising performances of the Metropolitan Handicap, finishing second behind the Irish-bred, English-trained runner In Excess as a long shot at 243-10 odds. In Excess pulled away to win by more than two lengths in 1:35.40, while Rubiano finished another 1¾ lengths ahead of Gervazy in third. Housebuster, the 4-5 favorite, broke sharply and led for much of the mile, but he began to shorten his stride near the quarter pole and faded badly in the stretch to 8th place. As In Excess moved past him on the outside, Rubiano also surged forward to win second, while five other horses passed the tiring favorite. Gervazy held on for third, while Black Tie Affair faded to ninth and Senor Speedy, who had stayed in the middle of the field early, tired to finish 13th.

On July 13, Rubiano again finished second in the Tom Fool Handicap, a four-horse race won by Mr. Nasty. Rubiano, entering as the favorite at 4-5, was unable to overcome the sloppy conditions that heavily favored the winner, Mr. Nasty. The sloppy conditions played a major part in his victory, as Mr. Nasty had already shown a strong preference for muddy tracks, having won the Gravesend Handicap over a muddy Aqueduct course previously. In the race, Mr. Nasty took the lead immediately and remained in front from start to finish, covering the seven furlongs in 1:21.79 on the muddy outer track. Rubiano chased him closely from the inside rail, attempting to launch a challenge, but Mr. Nasty was never seriously threatened and held on comfortably for the victory. Among the two other racers were Senor Speedy, who had recently been racing on turf and entered the Tom Fool after finishing third and second in his previous two Belmont starts. He was unable to match either Mr. Nasty or Rubiano on this occasion, however, finishing third. Formal Dinner completed the field in fourth and never stood as a major challenge. The Tom Fool field had originally been larger, but morning rain forced Diablo, Double Negative, and Heady Days to scratch, leaving only the four horses to compete. Years later, Preciado still remembered the race as one of Mr. Nasty's most significant victories, recalling, "Mr. Nasty ran against the best horses in New York every time, He won the Tom Fool. He beat Rubiano."

Rubiano again encountered Housebuster and Senor Speedy in the Forego Handicap at Saratoga on August 25. Housebuster won the Forego Handicap by defeating the 32-1 outsider Senor Speedy by a nose, Senor Speedy had finished second, one length ahead of Clever Trevor, while Rubiano came home another two and a half lengths behind Clever Trevor in fourth. In the race, riding under Craig Perret, Housebuster set the pace from the start and quickly established himself at the front. He covered the opening half-mile in roughly 43.4 seconds while facing pressure from Clever Trevor, who stayed close to the front runners. Housebuster eventually shook off Clever Trevor and opened a two-length advantage entering the stretch. But Senor Speedy, who had been well back early and was still fifth after a half-mile, made a powerful move along the rail. He surged toward Housebuster in the final yards, Housebuster, however, responded to the challenge and fought back strongly enough to win in 1:21.08 by the narrowest margin.

Jerry Bailey, who had been originally scheduled to ride Rubiano in the Forego, was unable to continue riding after being involved in a "violent spill" that had happened earlier. While Bailey was uninjured, his horse, Docent, fell on the final turn, broke her ankle, and was put down.

Rubiano returned to his winning form in his next two starts, winning a one-mile allowance race on September 19 and a handicap race at Belmont Park on October 19, both in a "driving" finish.

==== 1991 NYRA Mile ====
Rubiano made his second attempt at the G1 NYRA Mile at Aqueduct Racetrack on October 26. Ridden by Hall of Fame jockey, Jose Santos, in a field of 15 runners, Rubiano settled well back early and was running tenth behind a strong pace. The leaders moved through an exceptionally fast opening three-quarters of a mile, reaching six furlongs in rapid succession. Santos initially found himself boxed in around the three-eighths pole with little room to maneuver. Santos later recalled that at that point he was effectively trapped, unable to move toward either the rail or the outside. With Rubiano still sitting behind a wall of rivals, Santos said he could do little more than pray for an opportunity of an opening. As the field began to fan out entering the stretch, Santos found room on the far outside and sent Rubiano through it.

Rubiano immediately began making up ground, he had been around tenth earlier in the race, but once in the clear he began passing runners in rapid succession. By the final furlong, Rubiano continued his momentum through the closing yards and caught Sultry Song, who had been near the front. The two battled toward the finish, with Rubiano gradually gaining the advantage. In the final strides, he edged past Sultry Song to win by a head. Rubiano completed the mile in 1:33.68, earning $300,000 of the $500,000 purse. Sultry Song held second, with Diablo finishing another length behind in third. The race was run fast. minutes after the finish, heavy fog settled over Aqueduct, briefly obscuring the track.

"Jose was behind a wall of horses, and he had no place to go. How he got him out, I don’t know."

— Scotty Schulhofer on Rubiano winning the 1991 NYRA Mile

The NYRA mile was Rubiano's most notable win of the season, his fifth victory in 11 starts in 1991 and his first GI win. His performance also reinforced his reputation as a powerful late-running miler in New York. He had already won the Westchester Handicap earlier in the year and had entered the NYRA Mile having won his two previous starts at Belmont Park. Rubiano's finish left an impression on both Santos and trainer Scotty Schulhofer. Santos later emphasized how difficult it had been to find an opening, while Schulhofer was amazed at how his jockey had managed to get Rubiano out of trouble and into the clear.

=== 1992: five year old season ===
Rubiano began his five-year-old season strong on March 22, winning the G3 Westchester Handicap, rallying from just behind the leaders to claim his second win in the race. He defeated Out Of Place by a nose, while jockey Jose Santos also earned his second Westchester victory after previously winning the race with King's Swan in 1987.

He returned to Aqueduct for the Carter Handicap on May 2, where he had finished fourth the previous year behind Housebuster. This time, Rubiano turned the tables, capturing the Carter Handicap and defeating In Excess, who finished third. In the race, Nine Carat took the early lead and held a narrow advantage around the far turn, where In Excess soon moved forward to take the lead. Two Freedom also began gaining ground as the field entered the home stretch. Entering the final furlong, Kid Russell made a strong move on the outside and briefly took the lead. In Excess fought back, while Rubiano closed rapidly from the outside. Nine Carat faded from contention as the race came down to the final strides. Rubiano and In Excess battled with Kid Russell toward the finish, but Rubiano would end up winning in 1:21.20 by a head over Kid Russell, with In Excess finishing third.

Rubiano returned to the Metropolitan Handicap on May 25 at 4-1 odds, facing a field that included Dixie Brass, In Excess and Pleasant Tap. However, unlike his finish in the previous year, Rubiano struggled to place high and finished eighth in the 11 horse field behind the winner Dixie Brass, it was his first defeat of the season and his first defeat in six races. The pace was exceptionally fast, with Dixie Brass completing the first quarter-mile in 22.4 seconds and the half-mile in 44.8. As the field approached the final turn, In Excess moved closer and was only about a length behind Dixie Brass, while Twilight Agenda also remained within striking distance. Rubiano, however, was still well back, roughly nine lengths off the lead. Despite the pressure from the older runners, Dixie Brass still maintained his advantage.

Pleasant Tap then made a strong late move, while In Excess and Twilight Agenda tried to challenge for the minor placings. Dixie Brass continued to pull away and won wire-to-wire in 1:33.60. Pleasant Tap finished second, with In Excess fighting Twilight Agenda for third place. Rubiano, who had been sent off at 4-1 odds, struggled to make an impact, finishing eighth. The result was also disappointing for In Excess, last year's Metropolitan Handicap winner and New York handicap champion. His trainer, Bruce Jackson, commented that the horse was not yet performing at the same level he had shown the previous season, saying "I guess he's not back to where he was at this time last year. Hey, things happen." Twilight Agenda, another highly regarded older horse, also failed to challenge for the victory despite breaking well and staying near the front early in the race.

After a streak of five narrow photo-finish victories and a disappointing eighth-place finish, Rubiano bounced back with a win in the Tom Fool Stakes at Belmont. Ridden by Julie Krone, Rubiano won a one length victory over runner-up Take Me Out, who finished a length and a half ahead of Arrowtown. As the field turned for home, Shining Bid held a slim lead while Take Me Out pressured from the outside, and Rubiano waited closely in fourth. Rounding into the final stretch, Take Me Out made a strong push, but Rubiano surged through an opening on the inside rail. Rubiano and Take Me Out battled fiercely into the final sixteenth of a mile before Rubiano pulled ahead to finish. He completed the race in 1:21.6.

In the Forego Handicap on August 16, Formal Dinner, Arrowtown, Shining Bid, Diablo, and Burn Fair all scrambled for the lead. Formal Dinner and Shining Bid claimed the front positions, pushing a fast quarter-mile in 22.2 seconds, while Drummond Lane advanced from the back and Rubiano sat seventh, trapped behind horses. Down the backstretch, the pace remained demanding with a half-mile in 45.2 seconds as Shining Bid and Formal Dinner battled, Diablo tracked them, and Drummond Lane moved four wide. Entering the far turn, Shining Bid led narrowly over Formal Dinner while Drummond Lane threatened outside and Rubiano's jockey, Julie Krone, searched for running room. Turning for home, Rubiano shifted outside, found his stride, and launched a strong rally at the top of the stretch. He joined Drummond Lane past the eighth pole, took the lead, drew clear by a half-length, and widened his margin to finish 4 lengths ahead of Drummond Lane. Diablo placed third, trailing Drummond Lane by 1½ lengths. The victory earned $70,080 for his owners Centennial Farms, pushing Rubiano's career earnings past the $1 million mark with 12 wins in 26 starts. his jockey for the race, Julie Krone, recalled the race's turning point,

"When I started coming around the turn, Chris Antley tried to take Diablo out and started pushing us. Rubiano just held his ground and tried to bite him. He exudes confidence. It's like a big game to him. If someone were to ask me who's the best horse I've ever ridden, I'd have to put him at the top of the list. Riding a horse like Rubiano is one in a million."

— Julie Krone on Rubiano winning the 1992 Forego Handicap

Another one of Rubiano's strong performances of the season came on October 3 in the G1 Vosburgh Stakes. The race had an exceptionally strong field that included five G1 winners. Among his rivals were Salt Lake, Dixie Brass, Furiously, and 1991 Breeders’ Cup Juvenile winner Fly So Free, as well as Sheikh Albadou, the European Champion Sprinter and winner of the 1991 Breeders’ Cup Sprint.

At the start, Burn Fair, Salt Lake, and Dixie Brass broke quickly, with Dixie Brass taking the early lead. Salt Lake settled just behind him, with Sheikh Albadou, Burn Fair, Furiously, and Fly So Free just behind. Rubiano was seventh along the inside about three lengths from the lead. Binalong was far behind the field. Dixie Brass set the pace through the first quarter-mile in 22.6 seconds, but Salt Lake soon moved forward to challenge for the lead. Furiously was forced to race four wide, while Sheikh Albadou remained prominently placed and began to look like a serious threat. Around the far turn, Salt Lake took command as Dixie Brass retreated, while Sheikh Albadou stayed close. The half-mile was completed in 45.4 seconds.

Rubiano had quietly worked his way into position behind the leaders, but as the field approached the stretch, he was boxed in and needed racing room. Salt Lake held the lead, with Sheikh Albadou applying pressure. Rubiano attempted to squeeze through a narrow opening along the inside, but ended up having to switch to the outside. Sheikh Albadou surged into the lead while Salt Lake continued fighting, but Rubiano found clear running room and charged after Sheikh Albadou in the final stages, rapidly closing the gap and continuing to press forward all the way to the wire. In an extremely close finish, Rubiano caught Sheikh Albadou on the wire and defeated him by a length, winning the Vosburgh in 1:22.80. It would also be his trainers, Scotty Schulhofer, fourth Vosburgh victory.

==== 1992 Breeders Cup Sprint ====
Rubiano returned to Gulfstream Park on October 31 for the G1 Breeders' Cup Sprint. He entered the race as the 2-1 favorite. Among Rubiano's other notable rivals were the Bob Baffert trainee Thirty Slews, Salt Lake, King Corrie, Meafara, Sheikh Albadou, Elbio, Arrowtown, Senor Speedy, and Mr Brooks. Mr Brooks, another accomplished European sprinter along with Elbio, had finished second to Sheikh Albadou in the King's Stand Stakes before later defeating him in the July Cup. He also finished strongly behind Sheikh Albadou in the Haydock Sprint Cup. King Corrie was a champion in his home country Canada, winning the Sovereign Award for 1991 Champion Sprinter.

When the gates opened, Meafara immediately established herself on the lead. Rubiano also broke very well but did not remain close to the front. Rubiano dropped all the way back to around 12th on the backstretch, putting a substantial number of horses between himself and the leaders. While Meafara continued to race strongly on the front end, Thirty Slews stayed within striking distance and Sheikh Albadou remained closer to the action than Rubiano.

As the field approached the final turn, Rubiano began moving forward, but he had an enormous amount of ground to make up. At the front, Meafara continued to run strongly. Thirty Slews had followed her throughout the race and was beginning to draw alongside her as they entered the final stages. Rubiano began passing horses through the stretch, but the same conditions that had helped him close effectively in the NYRA Mile and Vosburgh Stakes were not present here. Thirty Slews finally wore down Meafara in the closing strides and managed to edge ahead and win over Meafara by a neck. The winning time was 1:08.21, setting a new Breeders' Cup record for the Sprint and giving his trainer, Bob Baffert, his first G1 win, Breeders Cup win, and great recognition. Meafara got second, while Rubiano's late charge carried him into third, finishing from the 4th place runner Sheikh Albadou by a nose.

After the race, Rubiano was retired and given the Eclipse Award for American Champion Sprint Horse, earning $1,252,817 overall.

== Stud record ==
In 1993, Rubiano entered stud at Lane's End Farm in Kentucky, where he would find great success as a sire. Rubiano produced over 360 winners, and 33 stakes winners from 510 named foals. His most notable progeny are the G1 winners Burning Roma and Impression, Too Much Bling, Starry Dreamer who's also the dam of War Front, with War Front being the sire of Declaration of War, Air Force Blue, Roly Poly, U S Navy Flag, Omaha Beach, War of Will, and many others. Rubiano's son, Impression, was a successful racehorse in Argentina and was the sire of Gloria De Campeao, a champion Brazilian racehorse and the highest money earner in South America.

Rubiano was euthanized on November 19, 2002 at Lane's End Farm after developing laminitis.

== Pedigree ==
Pedigree of Rubiano (USA) Grey Stallion 1987
Sire Fappiano (USA)	Mr. Prospector (USA)	Raise a Native (USA)	Native Dancer
Sire Fappiano (USA)	Mr. Prospector (USA)	Raise a Native (USA)	Raise You
Sire Fappiano (USA)	Mr. Prospector (USA)	Gold Digger (USA)	Nashua
Sire Fappiano (USA)	Mr. Prospector (USA)	Gold Digger (USA)	Sequence
Sire Fappiano (USA)	Killaloe (USA)	Dr. Fager (USA)	Rough'n Tumble
Sire Fappiano (USA)	Killaloe (USA)	Dr. Fager (USA)	Aspidistra
Sire Fappiano (USA)	Killaloe (USA)	Grand Splendor (USA)	Correlation
Sire Fappiano (USA)	Killaloe (USA)	Grand Splendor (USA)	Cequillo
Dam Ruby Slippers (USA)	Nijinsky (CAN)	Northern Dancer (CAN)	Nearctic
Dam Ruby Slippers (USA)	Nijinsky (CAN)	Northern Dancer (CAN)	Natalma
Dam Ruby Slippers (USA)	Nijinsky (CAN)	Flaming Page (USA)	Bull Page
Dam Ruby Slippers (USA)	Nijinsky (CAN)	Flaming Page (USA)	Flaring Top
Dam Ruby Slippers (USA)	Moon Glitter (USA)	In Reality (USA)	Intentionally
Dam Ruby Slippers (USA)	Moon Glitter (USA)	In Reality (USA)	My Dear Girl
Dam Ruby Slippers (USA)	Moon Glitter (USA)	Foggy Note (USA)	The Axe II
Dam Ruby Slippers (USA)	Moon Glitter (USA)	Foggy Note (USA)	Silver Song
