= Roly Poly (horse) =

American-bred Thoroughbred racehorse

- Sire: War Front
- Grandsire: Danzig
- Dam: Misty For Me
- Damsire: Galileo
- Sex: Mare
- Foaled: 2 February 2014
- Country: United States
- Colour: Bay
- Breeder: Misty For Me Syndicate
- Owner: Derrick Smith, Susan Magnier & Michael Tabor
- Trainer: Aidan O'Brien
- Record: 18: 6-4-0
- Earnings: £710,142

Major wins
- Grangecon Stud Stakes (2016); Duchess of Cambridge Stakes (2016); Falmouth Stakes (2017); Prix Rothschild (2017); Sun Chariot Stakes (2017)

Roly Poly (foaled 2 February 2014) is an American-bred, Irish-trained Thoroughbred racehorse. As a two-year-old in 2016 she won three of her eight races including the Grangecon Stud Stakes and the Duchess of Cambridge Stakes as well as finishing second in the Cheveley Park Stakes and the Lowther Stakes. In the following year she proved herself to be a top-class performer over one mile, recording Group 1 victories in the Falmouth Stakes, Prix Rothschild and Sun Chariot Stakes and running second in both the Irish 1,000 Guineas and the Coronation Stakes.

== Background ==
Roly Poly is a bay mare with a white blaze bred in Kentucky by the Misty For Me Syndicate. As a yearling in September 2015 she was offered for sale at Keeneland but failed to reach her reserve price of $575,000. She was then sent to Europe and entered training with Aidan O'Brien at Ballydoyle. She is owned by John Magnier's Coolmore Stud partnership (officially Michael Tabor, Susan Magnier and Derrick Smith).

She was sired by War Front who won the Alfred G. Vanderbilt Handicap in 2006. Since retiring War Front has also sired War Command, Declaration of War, and Air Force Blue. Roly Poly's dam Misty For Me was an outstanding racemare whose wins included the Moyglare Stud Stakes, Prix Marcel Boussac, Irish 1,000 Guineas and Pretty Polly Stakes. As a broodmare, she has also produced Roly Poly's full brother U S Navy Flag. Misty For Me's dam Butterfly Cove was a half-sister to Fasliyev.

== Racing career ==
=== 2016: two-year-old season ===
Roly Poly made a successful racecourse debut on 25 April when she won a maiden race over five furlongs at Naas Racecourse, starting at odds of 10/1 and prevailing by a short head from the David Wachman-trained Gone To Russia. The filly was immediately stepped up in class and matched against male opposition for the Listed Marble Hill Stakes at the Curragh in which she finished fourth behind her stablemate Caravaggio. She was then sent to England for the Group 2 Queen Mary Stakes at Royal Ascot on 15 June but proved no threat to the American filly Lady Aurelia and came home in eighth place. Eleven days after her run at Ascot Roly Poly was made 3/1 favourite for the Grangecon Stud Stakes over six furlongs on yielding ground at the Curragh. Ridden by Ryan Moore she settled behind the leaders before making steady progress in the last quarter mile, gaining the advantage in the final strides and winning by a neck from the English challenger Seafront.

On 8 July Roly Poly was back in England for the Group 2 Duchess of Cambridge Stakes at Newmarket Racecourse and started the 6/1 third choice in the betting behind Bletchley (runner-up in the Albany Stakes) and the Godolphin representative Nasimi. With Moore again in the saddle she was among the leaders from the start and went to the front inside the final furlong despite hanging left under pressure. She kept on well in the final strides to win by half a length, a head and a short head from Magical Fire, Nations Alexander and Kilmah. After the race, Moore said "I’m delighted with her. It was too soft for her at Ascot and it was a fast race. She was very brave at the Curragh and she's backed up in under two weeks. She's very tough and genuine and has plenty of pace". The filly's busy schedule continued in August when she was sent to York Racecourse for the Lowther Stakes and finished second to Queen Kindly having led until well inside the final furlong.

In the Group 1 Cheveley Park Stakes at Newmarket Roly Poly started third favourite behind Lady Aurelia and Queen Kindly in a six-runner field. After tracking the front-running Lady Aurelia she overhauled the American filly 50 yards from the finish but was caught on the line and beaten a short head by her unfancied stablemate Brave Anna. Roly Poly ended her season with a trip to California to contest the Breeders' Cup Juvenile Fillies Turf at Santa Anita Park on 4 November. She never looked likely to win and finished ninth of the fourteen runners behind Good Money Honey.

=== 2017: three-year-old season ===
==== Spring ====
On her three-year-old debut Roly Poly started favourite for the Nell Gwyn Stakes (a trial race for the 1000 Guineas) over seven furlongs at Newmarket but finished only seventh behind Daban. In the Poule d'Essai des Pouliches run that year at Deauville Racecourse on 13 May, Roly Poly briefly took the lead 300 metres from the finish but was outpaced in the closing stages and came home sixth behind Precieuse. Two weeks later in the Irish 1,000 Guineas at the Curragh she produced a better effort as she stayed on well in the closing stages to take second place, four and three quarter lengths behind her stablemate Winter with Hydrangea in third place.

==== Summer ====
The filly continued her progress in the Coronation Stakes at Royal Ascot in June as she finished two and a quarter lengths second to Winter with Hydrangea in third and Precieuse in seventh. On 14 July Roly Poly started 6/4 favourite for the Group 1 Falmouth Stakes over one mile at Newmarket. Her six rivals were Wuheida (Prix Marcel Boussac), Sea of Grace (runner-up in the Poule d'Essai des Pouliches), Arabian Hope (Ganton Stakes), Delectation (Schwarzgold-Rennen), Opal Tiara (Balanchine) and the Argentinian Grade I winner Greta G. In a tactical change, Moore sent the favourite into the lead from the start and Roly Poly was never seriously challenged, establishing a clear advantage in the final furlong and winning "comfortably" by one and a quarter lengths from Wuheida. After the race her co-owner Michael Tabor commented "It was pretty straightforward. She loves this ground, that's for sure. Ryan said when he came into the paddock that he thought the best thing would be to take her to the front, and she did it well. She's a tough, hardy filly; she's small but she battles well and this surface really suits her".

Sixteen days after her win in the Falmouth, Roly Poly was sent to France for the Group 1 Prix Rothschild over 1600 metres at Deauville and started the 3.2/1 second favourite behind Qemah. The other eight runners included Usherette (Duke of Cambridge Stakes), Persuasive, Dame du Roi (Prix Miesque), Via Ravenna (Prix Imprudence), Siyoushake (Prix Perth) and Furia Cruzada (Al Maktoum Challenge, Round 2). Roly Poly was up with the leaders from the start and took the advantage 500 metres out. She kept on strongly in the closing stages and held on to win in a four-way photo-finish from Via Ravenna, Siyoushake and Qemah. Ryan Moore commented "All through the season she has continued to progress and this was her best-ever performance. She tries so hard and is a high-class filly who seems to thrive on her racing".

==== Autumn ====
On 9 September Roly Poly started 13/2 fourth choice in a strongly contested edition of the Matron Stakes at Leopardstown. After leading for most of the way she was overtaken approaching the final furlong and faded in the closing stages to finish sixth behind Hydrangea, Winter, Persuasive, Wuheida and Qemah. Four weeks after her run in the Matron the filly had her eighth run in England when she started 4/1 second favourite behind Persuasive in the Sun Chariot Stakes at Newmarket. The other eleven fillies and mares included Qemah, Usherette, Siyoushake, Aljazzi (Atalanta Stakes) and Muffri'Ha (Darley Stakes). After leading for most of the way she was overtaken by the outsider Dawn of Hope but rallied to regain the advantage inside the final furlong. She drew away from her rivals in the last strides and won by one and quarter lengths from Persuasive. Her win brought took Aidan O'Brien's total of Group 1 wins for the season to 23, two behind Bobby Frankel's record. The trainer commented "She's a great filly, with a great heart. She's tactical and tough, amazing really".

As in the previous year, Roly Poly produced a disappointing run in the Breeders Cup. On this occasion she started third favourite for the Breeders' Cup Mile at Del Mar Racetrack on 4 November but finished unplaced behind World Approval. She ended the season with a trip to Hong Kong for the Hong Kong Mile at Sha Tin Racecourse on 10 December but came home last of the fourteen runners.

== Assessment and awards ==
In the Cartier Racing Awards for 2016, Roly Poly was nominated for the Champion Two-year-old Filly award. In the following year, Roly Poly was one of four nominees for the Champion Three-year-old Filly title, but lost out to Enable.

== Pedigree ==
Pedigree of Roly Poly, bay filly, 2014
Sire War Front (USA) 2002	Danzig (USA); 1977	Northern Dancer	Nearctic
Sire War Front (USA) 2002	Danzig (USA); 1977	Northern Dancer	Natalma
Sire War Front (USA) 2002	Danzig (USA); 1977	Pas de Nom	Admiral's Voyage
Sire War Front (USA) 2002	Danzig (USA); 1977	Pas de Nom	Petitioner
Sire War Front (USA) 2002	Starry Dreamer (USA); 1994	Rubiano	Fappiano
Sire War Front (USA) 2002	Starry Dreamer (USA); 1994	Rubiano	Ruby Slippers
Sire War Front (USA) 2002	Starry Dreamer (USA); 1994	Lara's Star	Forli
Sire War Front (USA) 2002	Starry Dreamer (USA); 1994	Lara's Star	True Reality
Dam Misty For Me (IRE) 2008	Galileo (IRE); 1998	Sadler's Wells	Northern Dancer
Dam Misty For Me (IRE) 2008	Galileo (IRE); 1998	Sadler's Wells	Fairy Bridge
Dam Misty For Me (IRE) 2008	Galileo (IRE); 1998	Urban Sea	Miswaki
Dam Misty For Me (IRE) 2008	Galileo (IRE); 1998	Urban Sea	Allegretta
Dam Misty For Me (IRE) 2008	Butterfly Gold (USA); 2001	Storm Cat	Storm Bird
Dam Misty For Me (IRE) 2008	Butterfly Gold (USA); 2001	Storm Cat	Terlingua
Dam Misty For Me (IRE) 2008	Butterfly Gold (USA); 2001	Mr P's Princess	Mr. Prospector
Dam Misty For Me (IRE) 2008	Butterfly Gold (USA); 2001	Mr P's Princess	Anne Campbell (Family: 16-h)

- Roly Poly was inbred 3 × 4 to Northern Dancer, meaning that this stallion appears in both the third and fourth generations of her pedigree.
