= Brave Anna =

American-bred Thoroughbred racehorse

- Racing silks of Evie Stockwell
- Sire: War Front
- Grandsire: Danzig
- Dam: Liscanna
- Damsire: Sadler's Wells
- Sex: Mare
- Foaled: 3 March 2014
- Country: United States
- Colour: Bay
- Breeder: Evie Stockwell
- Owner: Evie Stockwell
- Trainer: Aidan O'Brien
- Record: 7: 3-0-0
- Earnings: £161,867

Major wins
- Albany Stakes (2016); Cheveley Park Stakes (2016)

Awards
- Top-rated European-trained two-year-old filly (2016)

Brave Anna (foaled 3 March 2014) is an American-bred, Irish-trained Thoroughbred racehorse. As a two-year-old in 2016 she was rated the joint-best filly of her generation trained in Europe, inferior only to the American filly Lady Aurelia. After running moderately on her racecourse debut she won a maiden race before taking the Albany Stakes at Royal Ascot. She was unplaced in her next two races before ending her season with a win in the Cheveley Park Stakes.

== Background ==
Brave Anna is a bay mare with a white blaze bred in Kentucky by her owner Evelyn "Evie" Stockwell. Stockwell was the mother of John Magnier, the owner of the Coolmore Stud organisation. The filly was sent into training with Aidan O'Brien at Ballydoyle.

She was sired by War Front who won the Alfred G. Vanderbilt Handicap in 2006. Since retiring War Front has also sired Declaration of War, War Command, Air Force Blue, Summer Soiree (Del Mar Oaks), Sweet Orange (Hong Kong Classic Mile), Data Link (Maker's Mark Mile Stakes) and The Factor (Malibu Stakes).

Brave Anna's dam Liscanna was a good sprinter who won the Ballyogan Stakes for Evie Stockwell as a three-year-old in 2007. In addition to Brave Anna, she has also produced Hit It A Bomb (also sired by War Front) who won the Breeders' Cup Juvenile Turf in 2015. Liscanna's dam Lahinch won the Leopardstown 1,000 Guineas Trial and was a descendant of the American broodmare Evening Belle (foaled 1945) who was also the female-line ancestor of Overskate.

== Racing career ==
=== 2016: two-year-old season ===
Brave Anna made her racecourse debut in a maiden race over five furlongs at Naas Racecourse on 25 April in which she made little impression and finished eighth behind her stablemate Roly Poly. On 21 May at the Curragh the filly started at odds of 9/2 for a maiden over six furlongs and recorded her first success, taking the lead inside the final furlong and winning by a length from Lady Beware. On 17 June Brave Anna was sent to England and stepped up in class for the Group Three Albany Stakes at Royal Ascot. Ridden as on her previous start by Seamie Heffernan she started a 16/1 outsider in a sixteen-runner field headed by her stablemate Cuff, the 2/1 favourite. She started slowly and raced towards the rear of the field in the early stages before beginning to make progress in the last quarter mile. She took the lead a furlong out and held on to win by a short head from Bletchley, with Queen Kindly half a length away in third place. Heffernan commented "She's a lovely filly and came here on the back of a good win at the Curragh. It's nice we can pitch up here on the big day and win again. Aidan told me to give her a chance and hopefully she'd finish out well and that's what she's done." whilst Aidan OBrien said that the filly would improve over longer distances and was a potential 1,000 Guineas contender.

After a break of over two months Brave Anna returned in the Group Two Debutante Stakes over six furlongs at the Curragh in August. She started at odds of 5/1 but was never able to challenge the leaders and finished sixth behind the Aidan O'Brien-trained Rhododendron. Yet another stablemate Hydrangea finished second ahead of Intricately who was trained by O'Brien's son Joseph. On 11 September Brave Anna was moved up to Group One level for the Moyglare Stud Stakes over seven furlongs at the same track and finished sixth again, as Intricately won from Hydrangea and Rhododendron.

Thirteen days after her poor effort in the Moyglare, Brave Anna was sent to England for the second time for the Group One Cheveley Park Stakes over six furlongs at Newmarket Racecourse. She was again partnered by Heffernan and started a 25/1 outsider in a six-runner field. The unbeaten American-trained filly Lady Aurelia started 4/6 favourite ahead of Queen Kindly (Lowther Stakes) and Roly Poly (Duchess of Cambridge Stakes) whilst the other two runners were Holy Cat (second in the Round Tower Stakes) and Pellucid (third in the Dick Poole Stakes). Lady Aurelia went to the front and opened up a clear lead as Brave Anna raced towards the rear of the field. The American filly began to struggle a furlong out as Brave Anna began to stay on and make progress. Roly Poly overtook the favourite 50 yards from the finish but Brave Anna maintained her run, caught her stablemate in the final stride and won by a short head. After the race Aidan O'Brien, who was winning the race for the first time, said "She's a good, hardy filly and we were afraid the seven furlongs was a bit too much for her the last day, but you'd say, looking at her today, she'd get the seven okay. She had a good break after Ascot and maybe she got a little bit tired in the Moyglare at the Curragh, but she came home very well".

=== 2017: three-year-old season ===
On her first appearance of 2017 Brave Anna was sent back to Newmarket to contest the seven furlong Nell Gwyn Stakes (a trial race for the 1000 Guineas) on 19 April. Ridden by Heffernan she started at odds of 13/2 but never looked likely to win and finished unplaced behind Daban.

== Assessment ==
In the official European Classification of two-year-olds for 2016 Brave Anna was given a rating of 116, making her the second best juvenile filly of the season, five pounds behind Lady Aurelia and level with Rhododendron.

== Pedigree ==
Pedigree of Brave Anna, bay filly, 2014
Sire War Front (USA) 2002	Danzig (USA); 1977	Northern Dancer	Nearctic
Sire War Front (USA) 2002	Danzig (USA); 1977	Northern Dancer	Natalma
Sire War Front (USA) 2002	Danzig (USA); 1977	Pas de Nom	Admiral's Voyage
Sire War Front (USA) 2002	Danzig (USA); 1977	Pas de Nom	Petitioner
Sire War Front (USA) 2002	Starry Dreamer (USA); 1994	Rubiano	Fappiano
Sire War Front (USA) 2002	Starry Dreamer (USA); 1994	Rubiano	Ruby Slippers
Sire War Front (USA) 2002	Starry Dreamer (USA); 1994	Lara's Star	Forli
Sire War Front (USA) 2002	Starry Dreamer (USA); 1994	Lara's Star	True Reality
Dam Liscanna (IRE) 2004	Sadler's Wells (USA); 1981	Northern Dancer	Nearctic
Dam Liscanna (IRE) 2004	Sadler's Wells (USA); 1981	Northern Dancer	Natalma
Dam Liscanna (IRE) 2004	Sadler's Wells (USA); 1981	Fairy Bridge	Bold Reason
Dam Liscanna (IRE) 2004	Sadler's Wells (USA); 1981	Fairy Bridge	Special
Dam Liscanna (IRE) 2004	Lahinch (IRE); 1999	Danehill Dancer	Danehill
Dam Liscanna (IRE) 2004	Lahinch (IRE); 1999	Danehill Dancer	Mira Adonde
Dam Liscanna (IRE) 2004	Lahinch (IRE); 1999	Dublah	Private Account
Dam Liscanna (IRE) 2004	Lahinch (IRE); 1999	Dublah	Separate Checks (Family: 22-b)

- Brave Anna was inbred 3 × 3 to Northern Dancer, meaning that this stallion appears twice in the third generation of her pedigree.
