= U S Navy Flag (horse) =

Thoroughbred racehorse trained in Ireland

- Racing silks of Mr Derrick Smith
- Sire: War Front
- Grandsire: Danzig
- Dam: Misty For Me
- Damsire: Galileo
- Sex: Colt
- Foaled: 6 February 2015
- Country: United States
- Colour: Bay
- Breeder: Misty For Me Syndicate
- Owner: Derrick Smith, Susan Magnier & Michael Tabor
- Trainer: Aidan O'Brien
- Record: 18: 5-2-2
- Earnings: £1,021,755

Major wins
- Round Tower Stakes (2017); Middle Park Stakes (2017); Dewhurst Stakes (2017); July Cup (2018)

Awards
- Cartier Champion Two-year-old Colt (2017); Top-rated European two-year-old (2017)

U S Navy Flag (foaled 6 February 2015) is an American-bred, Irish-trained Thoroughbred racehorse. In 2017 he became the first horse in 35 years to win both the Middle Park Stakes and the Dewhurst Stakes. As two-year-old he was beaten in his first four racecourse appearances, including the Coventry Stakes before winning a maiden race in July. He then finished second in the July Stakes and fourth in the Phoenix Stakes before recording his first significant win in the Group 3 Round Tower Stakes. He won the Middle Park Stakes at Newmarket Racecourse on 30 September and returned to the same track two weeks later to follow up in the Dewhurst Stakes. As a three-year-old in 2018 he ran in several major mile races without success before dropping back to sprint distances to win the July Cup.

== Background ==
U S Navy Flag is a bay horse bred in Kentucky by the Misty For Me Syndicate. During his racing career U S Navy Flag has been trained by Aidan O'Brien at Ballydoyle. He is owned by John Magnier's Coolmore Stud partnership (officially Michael Tabor, Susan Magnier and Derrick Smith), usually racing in the purple and white colours of Derrick Smith. He usually races in a tongue-tie.

He was sired by War Front who won the Alfred G. Vanderbilt Handicap in 2006. Since retiring War Front has also sired War Command, Declaration of War and Air Force Blue. U S Navy Flag's dam Misty For Me was an outstanding racemare whose wins included the Moyglare Stud Stakes, Prix Marcel Boussac, Irish 1,000 Guineas and Pretty Polly Stakes. As a broodmare, she has also produced U S Navy Flag's full sister Roly Poly. Misty For Me's dam Butterfly Cove was a half-sister to Fasliyev.

== Racing career ==
=== 2017: two-year-old season ===
U S Navy Flag began his racing career in a maiden race over five furlongs at Naas Racecourse on 1 May in which he started at odds of 11/2 and finished fourth of the six runners. He ran third in a minor race at the Curragh twelve days later and was then stepped up in class for the Listed Marble Hill Stakes at the same track in which he finished third to Brother Bear. In June the colt was sent to England to contest the Group 2 Coventry Stakes at Royal Ascot but made little impact as he came home fourteenth of the eighteen runners behind Rajasinghe. The colt was then dropped back in class for a maiden at the Curragh of 1 July and was equipped with blinkers for the first time. Ridden as on his four previous starts by Seamie Heffernan he took the lead from the start and won "comfortably" by three and a half lengths.

Twelve days after recording his first success U S Navy Flag was sent to England for the second time for the July Stakes at Newmarket Racecourse in which he was partnered by Ryan Moore. Starting at odds of 10/1 he led for most of the way but was overtaken in the closing stages and beaten by the Mark Johnston-trained Cardsharp, with Rajasinghe in third. At the Curragh on 13 August the colt was partnered by his trainer's son Donnacha O'Brien when he was stepped up to Group 1 class to contest the Phoenix Stakes. He attempted to make all the running as usual but was outpaced in the final furlong and finished fourth behind his stablemate Sioux Nation, beaten two and a half lengths by the winner. Two weeks later the colt started 5/4 favourite for the Group 3 Round Tower Stakes over the same course and distance. With Moore again in the saddle he produced his customary front-running display before drawing away from his opponents in the final furlong and winning by six lengths from Landshark.

On 30 September at Newmarket, U S Navy Flag, ridden by Heffernan, was one of twelve colts to contest the Group 1 Middle Park Stakes over six furlongs and started at odds of 10/1. The Railway Stakes winner Beckford started favourite, whilst the other runners included Sioux Nation, Cardsharp, Rajasinghe, Unfortunately (Prix Morny) and Sands of Mali (Gimcrack Stakes). U S Navy Flag tracked the leader Hey Jonesy before taking the lead approaching the final furlong. He held off the sustained challenge of his unfancied stablemate Fleet Review to win by half a length, with a gap of two and a quarter lengths back to Cardsharp in third. After the race O'Brien said "He takes his racing well and is progressing with every run. He is long and he is powerful. I think he will go down the sprinting route, but there is nothing to say he won't get seven. He is a hardy horse that is progressing and when horses are like that, you can keep going with them". Heffernan added "He's a horse that's a bit gawky and looks around, so the blinkers help him focus and make the jockey's job easier".

At Newmarket on 14 October U S Navy Flag attempted to become the first horse since Diesis in 1982 to follow up a win in the Middle Park Stakes with a victory in the Dewhurst Stakes. Racing over seven furlongs for the first time he was ridden by Moore and went off the 5/1 second choice in the betting behind Expert Eye, a colt from the Michael Stoute stable who was unbeaten in two races including the Vintage Stakes. The other seven contenders included Cardsharp, Emaraaty and three other Aidan O'Brien-trained runners, namely Seahenge (Champagne Stakes), Threeandfourpence and Mendelssohn. After breaking quickly Moore brought the colt over to the rails on the stands side (the left hand side from the jockey's viewpoint) and set the pace from the start. U S Navy Flag opened up a clear advantage approaching the final furlong and kept on "strongly" to win by two and a half lengths from Mendelssohn. Seahenge and Threeandfourpence came next to complete a 1-2-3-4 for the Ballydoyle stable. O'Brien commented "I think he was overlooked a bit, wasn’t he? He's a tough, hardy horse. A very exciting horse really."

On his final appearance of the season U S Navy Flag was sent to California to contest the Breeders' Cup Juvenile at Del Mar Racetrack on 4 November. Racing on dirt for the first time he led for most of the way before dropping back in the last quarter mile and finishing tenth of the twelve runners behind Good Magic.

=== 2018: three-year-old season ===
U S Navy Flag made his seasonal debut in the 7 furlong Leopardstown 2,000 Guineas Trial Stakes on 14 April. He was sent off at odds of 6/1 in a field of four runners which included two stablemates in Gustav Klimt and Kenya. Ridden by Seamie Heffernan, U S Navy Flag raced in second place early in the race but dropped away to finish last of the four runners. The race was run on heavy going and O'Brien stated "We knew US Navy Flag would hate the ground, but we needed to get him out [he] might go to the English or French Guineas and he'll grow another leg between now and then." In the Poule d'Essai des Poulains over 1600 metres on 13 May he led for most of the way but after stumbling badly he was overtaken and faded to finish fifth behind Olmedo. Thirteen days the later the colt started second favourite for the Irish 2000 Guineas at the Curragh. He took the lead from the start and maintained his advantage until the last 100 metres when he was passed by the 25/1 outsider Romanised and beaten two and a quarter lengths into second place. In the St James's Palace Stakes at Royal Ascot the colt set the pace as usual but after being headed in the straight he dropped back quickly and came home ninth of the ten runners behind Without Parole.

On 14 July U S Navy Flag was dropped back to sprint distances to contest the July Cup over six furlongs at Newmarket and started at odds of 8/1 in a thirteen-runner field. Blue Point started favourite while the other contenders included Eqtidaar, Limato, Sands of Mali, Sioux Nation, Redkirk Warrior (Newmarket Handicap) and Brando (Prix Maurice de Gheest). Ridden by Moore, U S Navy Flag raced up the centre of the course and led the way throughout, keeping on well in the closing stages to win by one and three quarter lengths from Brando, with third place going to the 50/1 outsider Fleet Review. After the race Moore said "He loves Newmarket and ran a mighty race in the Irish Guineas. He's just a very fast horse and loves a fight – he found plenty when the second came to him. I was never worried about the trip, he just needs to have fast ground" while O'Brien commented "He had tough races in the Classics and had a very tough race in the Curragh. We thought it might leave his mark. He went to Ascot and Ryan said to come back in distance with him. We've seen what's happened. He's a very good horse, to be able to do it that as a three-year-old. In all fairness to the horse, he deserves a break. He's had a tough time".

In the autumn of 2018 U S Navy Flag was sent to race in Australia but had no success as finished unplaced in The Everest, the Manikato Stakes and the VRC Sprint Classic.

== Assessment and awards ==
On 16 November 2017 at the Cartier Racing Awards, U S Navy Flag was named Champion two-year-old colt.

In the official European Classification of two-year-olds for 2017, published in January 2018, U S Navy Flag was given a rating of 122, making him the best juvenile of the season, three pounds ahead of his stablemate Saxon Warrior.

In the 2018 World's Best Racehorse Rankings U S Navy Flag was rated the best three-year-old in the world over sprint distances and the 59th best horse of any age or sex.

== Stud career ==
In 2019 U S Navy Flag commenced stallion duties at Coolmore Stud.

In the same year he also performed as a shuttle stallion out of Valachi Downs Stud in Matamata, New Zealand and sired over 100 foals in his first two years. In 2021 he was relocated to the Oaks Stud and his service fee in 2022 was $15,000.

In 2020 U S Navy Flag had a service fee of €17,500 at Coolmore Stud.

By 2026 he had covered over 500 broodmares and his service fee was NZ$12,500.

== Pedigree ==
Pedigree of U S Navy Flag, bay colt, 2015
Sire War Front (USA) 2002	Danzig (USA); 1977	Northern Dancer	Nearctic
Sire War Front (USA) 2002	Danzig (USA); 1977	Northern Dancer	Natalma
Sire War Front (USA) 2002	Danzig (USA); 1977	Pas de Nom	Admiral's Voyage
Sire War Front (USA) 2002	Danzig (USA); 1977	Pas de Nom	Petitioner
Sire War Front (USA) 2002	Starry Dreamer (USA); 1994	Rubiano	Fappiano
Sire War Front (USA) 2002	Starry Dreamer (USA); 1994	Rubiano	Ruby Slippers
Sire War Front (USA) 2002	Starry Dreamer (USA); 1994	Lara's Star	Forli
Sire War Front (USA) 2002	Starry Dreamer (USA); 1994	Lara's Star	True Reality
Dam Misty For Me (IRE) 2008	Galileo (IRE); 1998	Sadler's Wells	Northern Dancer
Dam Misty For Me (IRE) 2008	Galileo (IRE); 1998	Sadler's Wells	Fairy Bridge
Dam Misty For Me (IRE) 2008	Galileo (IRE); 1998	Urban Sea	Miswaki
Dam Misty For Me (IRE) 2008	Galileo (IRE); 1998	Urban Sea	Allegretta
Dam Misty For Me (IRE) 2008	Butterfly Gold (USA); 2001	Storm Cat	Storm Bird
Dam Misty For Me (IRE) 2008	Butterfly Gold (USA); 2001	Storm Cat	Terlingua
Dam Misty For Me (IRE) 2008	Butterfly Gold (USA); 2001	Mr P's Princess	Mr. Prospector
Dam Misty For Me (IRE) 2008	Butterfly Gold (USA); 2001	Mr P's Princess	Anne Campbell (Family: 16-h)

- U S Navy Flag was inbred 3 × 4 to Northern Dancer, meaning that this stallion appears in both the third and fourth generations of his pedigree.
