= Gufo (horse) =

American racehorse

- Sire: Declaration of War
- Grandsire: War Front
- Dam: Floy
- Damsire: Petionville
- Sex: Horse
- Foaled: February 28, 2017
- Country: United States
- Color: Chestnut
- Breeder: John Little & Stephen Cainelli
- Owner: Otter Bend Stables
- Trainer: Christophe Clement
- Record: 21 : 9 - 4 - 5
- Earnings: $2,176,530

Major wins
- Kent Stakes (2020); Belmont Derby (2020); Sword Dancer Stakes (2021, 2022); Pan American Stakes (2022)
- Last updated on 9 October 2022

Gufo (foaled February 28, 2017) is a retired American multiple Grade I turf-winning Thoroughbred racehorse. His Grade I wins include the Belmont Derby in 2020 and the Sword Dancer Stakes in 2021 and 2022.

== Background ==
Gufo is a chestnut horse that was bred in Kentucky by John Little and Stephen Cainelli. He is a son of Declaration of War out of the Petionville mare Floy, who also produced another millionaire, track record holder and multiple graded stakes winner Hogy (Grade III Canadian Turf Stakes). Sire Declaration of War began his career at Ashford Stud in Kentucky and has been relocated only to sire Grade 1 winners on four continents. Gufo is currently owned by John and Laurie Little's Cave Brook Farm after being campaigned by their friend Steve Cainelli and trained by Christophe Clement.

== Racing career ==
As a two-year-old in 2019, Gufo finished third in a maiden special weight event at Aqueduct, then won first place at Gulfstream Park.

After winning two more events in July 2020, Gufo won his first Graded stakes event, the GIII Kent Stakes at Delaware Park. He broke the track record for the 1 1/8-mile distance.

Gufo was entered in the NYRA Turf Trinity events at Saratoga Derby Invitational Stakes and the Belmont Derby, which were moved to a later date in 2020 due to the COVID-19 pandemic in the United States. Gufo finished second to the British-bred Domestic Spending in the Saratoga Derby but then turned the tables in the Belmont Derby, capturing his first Grade I event.

In 2021, as a four-year-old, Gufo ran well at the highest levels at Belmont Park, finishing second in the Grade I Man o' War Stakes to Channel Cat by the smallest of margins (a nose) and then third in the Manhattan Stakes again to Domestic Spending after settling last and finishing wide beaten by four lengths. Later in the summer, Gufo captured his second Grade I event at Saratoga in the Sword Dancer Stakes with a game victory over British-bred and trained Japan by a neck. Gufo finished the season with a third as the 9/5 favorite in the GI Joe Hirsch Turf Classic and tenth in the Breeders' Cup Turf at Del Mar.

In his first start as a five-year-old, Gufo returned to the winner's circle with a comfortable two-length victory in the GII Pan American Stakes at Gulfstream Park. Gufo followed the same path as he had in 2021, running unsuccessfully in the Man o' War Stakes, finishing second to the longshot Irish-bred Highland Chief in a small field of five and once again finishing third in the Manhattan Stakes. Returning to Saratoga, Gufo showed his preference for the longer-distance Sword Dancer Stakes and displayed a strong finish to win the event for the second time. In his next start, Gufo was beaten by a nose in the GII Kentucky Turf Cup at Kentucky Downs as the 8/5 favorite. On October 8, she ran in the Grade I Joe Hirsch Turf Classic at Aqueduct. Gufo settled on the outside in the three-to-four path without the benefit of the cover, came under urging with three furlongs to run, turned into the upper stretch under a drive, and failed to rally, finishing last in a field of seven won by War Like Goddess.

== Retirement ==
On April 4, 2023, Gufo's retirement was announced by his trainer, Christophe Clement. Clement said that Gufo suffered a setback the previous month, citing owner/co-breeder Dr. Stephen Cainelli's assessment that Gufo had "done enough." He was sold to Cave Brook Farm and Gufo was sent to begin his stud career in 2024 at Ballycroy Bloodstock, outside Toronto, Ontario for a fee of CAN$4,500.

== Statistics ==
Date	Distance	Race	Grade	Track	Odds	Field	Finish	Winning Time	Winning (Losing) Margin	Jockey	Ref
2019 – two-year-old season
Nov 17, 2019	1 1/16 miles	Maiden Special Weight		Aqueduct	7.90	11	3	1:44.14	(1 1/2 lengths)	Irad Ortiz Jr.	
Dec 29, 2019	1 1/16 miles	Maiden Special Weight		Gulfstream Park	1.50*	10	1	1:42.46	nose	Irad Ortiz Jr.	
2020 – three-year-old season
Mar 27, 2020	1 1/8 miles	Allowance Optional Claiming		Gulfstream Park	2.10	11	1	1:47.23	1/2 length	Joel Rosario	
May 2, 2020	1 1/16 miles	English Channel Stakes		Gulfstream Park	2.20*	11	1	1:39.70	1 1/2 lengths	Irad Ortiz Jr.	
Jul 4, 2020	1 1/8 miles	Kent Stakes	III	Delaware Park	0.60*	7	1	1:46.94 (Note: Gufo set a new track for the 1 1/8-mile distance at Delaware Park)	1/2 length	Trevor McCarthy	
Aug 15, 2020	1 3/16 miles	Saratoga Derby		Saratoga	5.80	8	2	1:52.52	(head)	John Velazquez	
Oct 3, 2020	1 1/4 miles	Belmont Derby	I	Belmont Park	1.45*	8	1	2:02.25	1 length	Junior Alvarado	
Nov 28, 2020	1 1/8 miles	Hollywood Derby	I	Del Mar	3.20	11	3	1:47.15	(neck)	Flavien Prat	
2021 – four-year-old season
May 8, 2021	1 3/8 miles	Man o' War Stakes	I	Belmont Park	1.50*	8	2	2:13.34	(nose)	Joel Rosario	
Jun 5, 2021	1 1/4 miles	Manhattan Stakes	I	Belmont Park	4.00	10	3	1:59.08	(4 lengths)	Joel Rosario	
Jul 5, 2021	1 1/2 miles	Grand Couturier Stakes		Belmont Park	0.90*	6	1	2:28.73	1 length	Joel Rosario	
Aug 28, 2021	1 1/2 miles	Sword Dancer Stakes	I	Saratoga	2.55*	7	1	2:28.30	neck	Joel Rosario	
Oct 9, 2021	1 1/2 miles	Joe Hirsch Turf Classic	I	Belmont Park	1.85*	7	3	2:25.61	(3 1/2 lengths)	Joel Rosario	
Nov 6, 2021	1 1/2 miles	Breeders' Cup Turf	I	Del Mar	8.00*	14	10	2:25.90	(10 lengths)	Joel Rosario	
2022 – five-year-old season
Apr 2, 2022	abt. 1 1/2 miles	Pan American Stakes	II	Gulfstream Park	1.30*	7	1	2:27.28	2 lengths	Joel Rosario	
May 14, 2022	1 3/8 miles	Man o' War Stakes	I	Belmont Park	2.45	5	2	2:17.04	(1 length)	Joel Rosario	
Jun 11, 2022	1 1/4 miles	Manhattan Stakes	I	Belmont Park	2.25*	10	3	1:59.54	(4 1/2 lengths)	Joel Rosario	
Jul 23, 2022	1 3/8 miles	United Nations Stakes	I	Monmouth Park	2.40	10	5	2:12.68	(2 1/2 lengths)	Joel Rosario	
Aug 27, 2022	1 1/2 miles	Sword Dancer Stakes	I	Saratoga	4.40	10	1	2:28.92	1/2 length	Joel Rosario	
Sep 10, 2022	1 1/2 miles	Kentucky Turf Cup	II	Kentucky Downs	1.63*	12	2	2:26.96	(nose)	Joel Rosario	
Oct 8, 2022	1 1/2 miles	Joe Hirsch Turf Classic	I	Aqueduct	2.90	7	7	2:27.29	(7 lengths)	Junior Alvarado	

Legend:
Turf Dirt
Notes:
An (*) asterisk after the odds means Gufo was the post-time favorite.

== Pedigree ==
Pedigree of Gufo, chestnut horse, February 28, 2017
Sire Declaration of War (2009)	War Front (2002)	Danzig (1977)	Northern Dancer (1961)
Sire Declaration of War (2009)	War Front (2002)	Danzig (1977)	Pas de Nom (1968)
Sire Declaration of War (2009)	War Front (2002)	Starry Dreamer (1994)	Rubiano (1987)
Sire Declaration of War (2009)	War Front (2002)	Starry Dreamer (1994)	Lara's Star (1981)
Sire Declaration of War (2009)	Tempo West (1999)	Rahy (1985)	Blushing Groom (FR) (1974)
Sire Declaration of War (2009)	Tempo West (1999)	Rahy (1985)	Glorious Song (CAN) (1976)
Sire Declaration of War (2009)	Tempo West (1999)	Tempo (1992)	Gone West (1984)
Sire Declaration of War (2009)	Tempo West (1999)	Tempo (1992)	Terpsichorist (1975)
Dam Floy (2005)	Petionville (1992)	Seeking The Gold (1985)	Mr. Prospector (1970)
Dam Floy (2005)	Petionville (1992)	Seeking The Gold (1985)	Con Game (1974)
Dam Floy (2005)	Petionville (1992)	Vana Turns (1985)	Wavering Monarch (1979)
Dam Floy (2005)	Petionville (1992)	Vana Turns (1985)	The Wheel Turns (1977)
Dam Floy (2005)	Risen Miss (1997)	Peteski (CAN) (1990)	Affirmed (1975)
Dam Floy (2005)	Risen Miss (1997)	Peteski (CAN) (1990)	Vive (1985)
Dam Floy (2005)	Risen Miss (1997)	Eddie's Star (1991)	Risen Star (1985)
Dam Floy (2005)	Risen Miss (1997)	Eddie's Star (1991)	Bald Facts (1979) (family 21-a)
