= War Front (horse) =

American-bred Thoroughbred racehorse

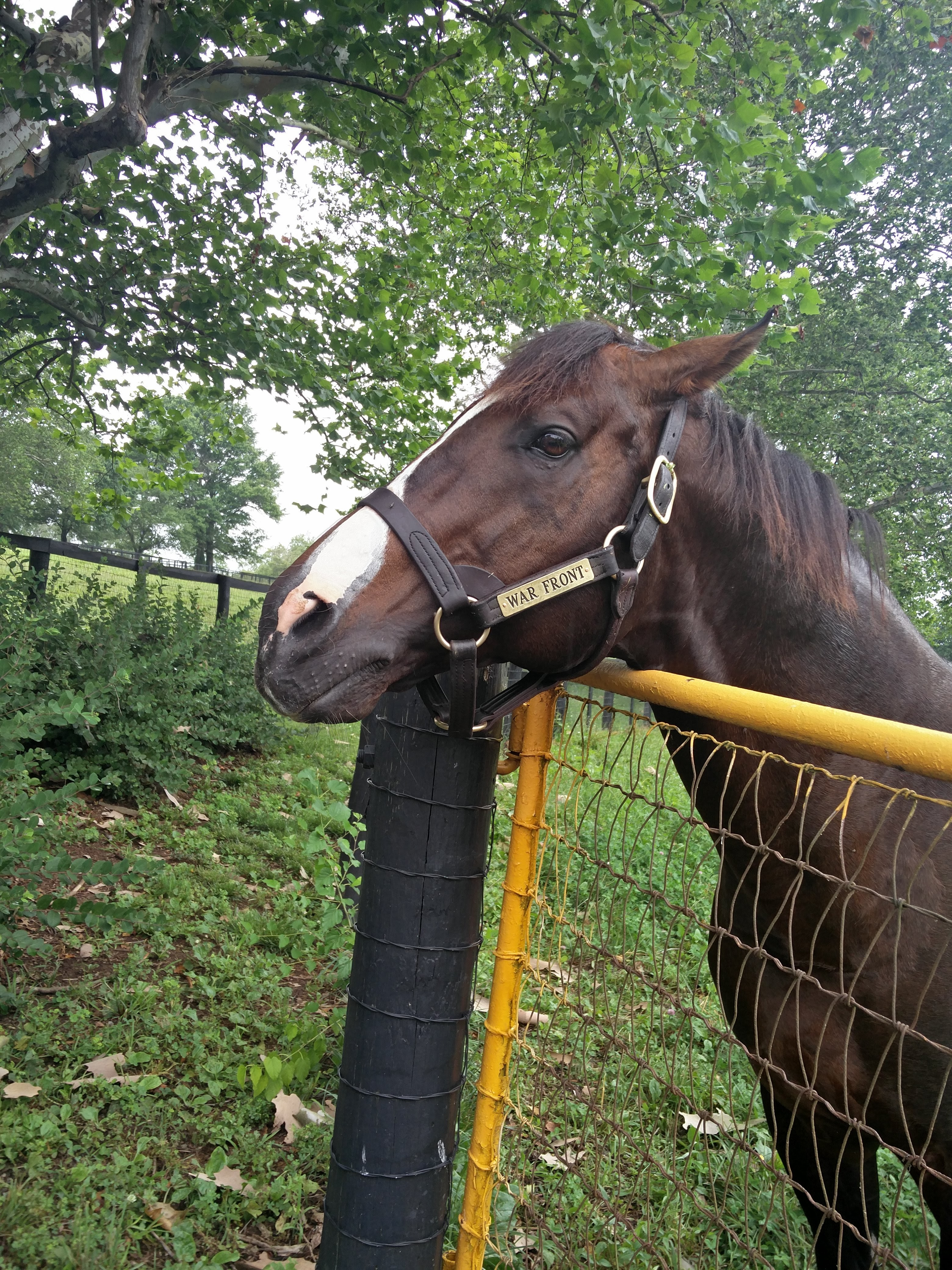
- War Front in 2016
- Sire: Danzig
- Grandsire: Northern Dancer
- Dam: Starry Dreamer
- Damsire: Rubiano
- Sex: Stallion
- Foaled: February 11, 2002 (age 24); Paris, Kentucky, U.S.
- Country: United States
- Color: Bay
- Breeder: Joseph Allen
- Owner: Joseph Allen
- Trainer: H. Allen Jerkens
- Jockey: Richard Migliore; José Santos; John Velazquez
- Record: 13: 4–5–1
- Earnings: $424,205

Major wins
- Alfred G. Vanderbilt Handicap (2006)

War Front (foaled February 11, 2002) is an American Thoroughbred racehorse. In 2006 he won the Alfred G. Vanderbilt Handicap and finished second in the Forego Handicap and Vosburgh Stakes. Since retiring from racing he has become one of the most expensive sires in the world. His offspring include Declaration of War, The Factor, Roly Poly, U S Navy Flag, Omaha Beach, Siege of Orleans and War of Will.

== Background ==
War Front is a bay horse bred by Joseph Allen and was foaled on February 11, 2002, at Claiborne Farm in Paris, Kentucky. He was sired by Danzig, who won three minor races, but was then retired to stud undefeated as a result of knee problems. He went on to become a successful stallion and was champion sire of North America in 1991, 1992 and 1993. Amongst his other progeny are Chief's Crown, Dance Smartly, Danehill, Dayjur, Green Desert, Hard Spun and Lure. War Front's dam is Starry Dreamer, a daughter of Rubiano who won six races and was placed in a number of graded races. War Front was trained by H. Allen Jerkens. At maturity he reached 15.3 hands (63 inches, 160 cm) high.

== Racing career ==
=== 2004: Two-year-old season ===
War Front made his racecourse debut on December 18, 2004, in a six-furlong maiden race at Aqueduct. He never challenged the leaders and finished in seventh place behind winner Diamond Wildcat. This was War Front's only race as a two-year-old.

Racing silks of Joseph Allen.

=== 2005: Three-year-old season ===
War Front's second race came on January 16, 2005, in a one-mile maiden at Aqueduct. After stumbling at the start he recovered to be up with the leaders. He raced three horses wide around the bend, before fading slightly in the final furlong, finishing in third place behind winner Tashdeed. War Front did not race again until August 31, when he was one of six horses to run in a six-furlong maiden at Saratoga. Jockey José Santos sent War Front into a clear lead and he drew away in the closing stages to win by over ten lengths from runner-up Master Command. War Front followed this up by winning an allowance race at Belmont Park on September 18. After being bumped by another horse at the start, he contested the lead for most of the race, before pulling clear in the home straight to win by six lengths from Stars Above. On October 10, War Front stepped up in class for the Princelet Stakes, which is run of one mile and half a furlong at Belmont Park. After racing near the front on the inside, he drew clear when José Santos got him to quicken, and won the race by eight lengths from Skagway. War Front's final race of 2005 was the Discovery Handicap, where he finished in sixth place behind winner Magna Graduate.

=== 2006: Four-year-old season ===
On January 7, 2006, War Front finished second in the Mr. Prospector Handicap at Gulfstream Park, a neck behind winner Gaff. The following month, War Front started as favorite for the Deputy Minister Handicap. After racing near the front in the early stages, War Front drew clear inside the final furlong, but was caught near the line by winner Universal Form, finishing a length behind him in second place. War Front then had a break from racing, returning on July 16 for the Tom Fool Handicap, where he again finished as the runner-up, beaten a neck by Silver Train. On his next start, the Alfred G. Vanderbilt Handicap on August 12, War Front started as the favorite and was ridden by regular jockey José Santos. He was up near the front as the six-runner field as the field went into the turn, before accelerating to take the lead while racing four horses wide. In the finishing straight he pulled steadily away to win by two and a half lengths from Judiths Wild Rush, who was a further one and a half lengths clear of third-placed Mass Media. Three weeks later, War Front raced at Grade I level for the first time when he contested the Forego Handicap. He bumped with Silver Wagon at the start and then raced up with the pace. He challenged in the finishing stretch, but could not get past winner Pomeroy and faded in the final stages to finish in second place, two and a quarter lengths behind Pomeroy, and a neck ahead of third-placed Friendly Island. Later in the year, War Front finished second in the Vosburgh Stakes. In his final race he finished seventh behind winner Thor's Echo in the Breeders' Cup Sprint.

== Stud career ==
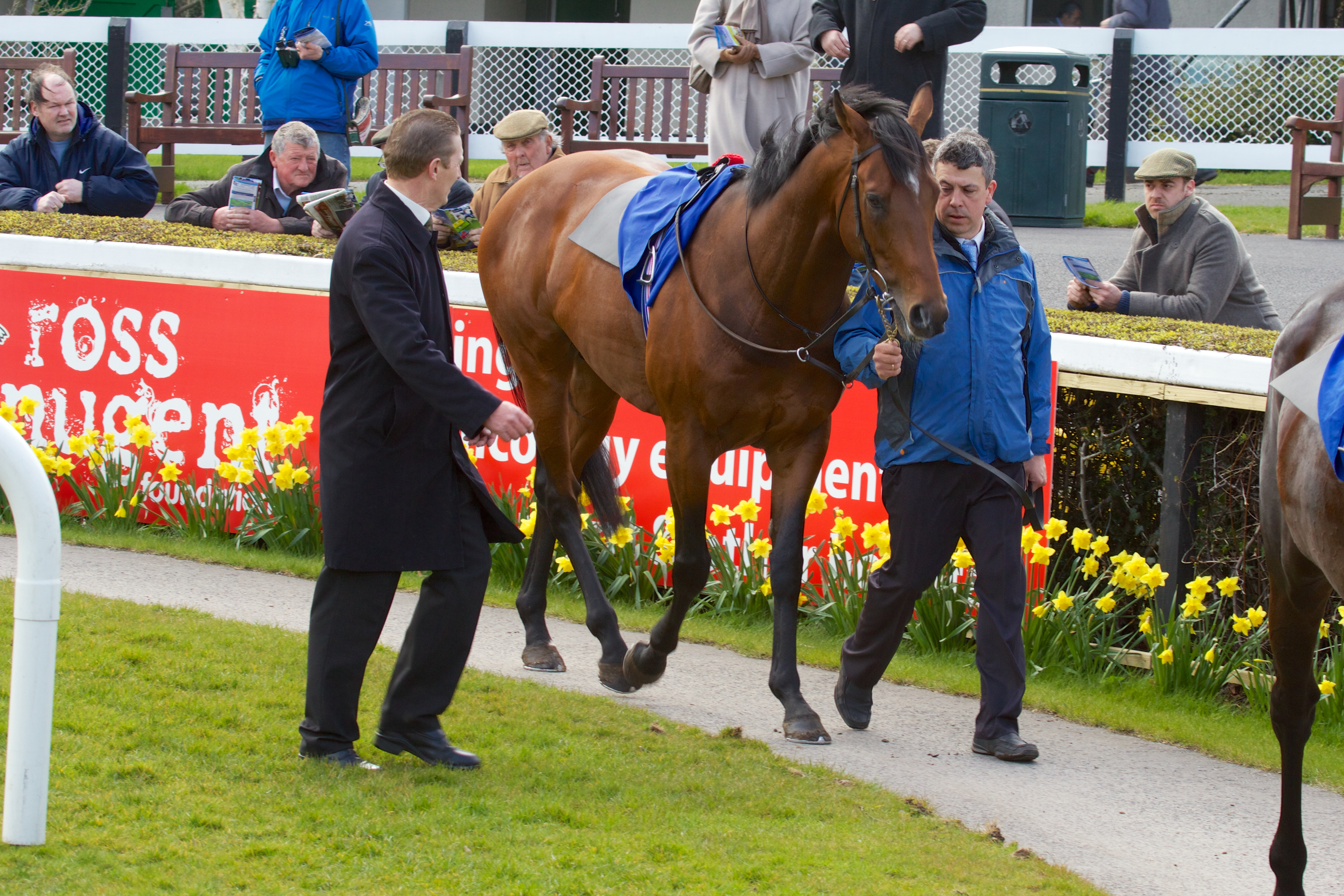
War Front's son Declaration of War

War Front was retired to stud at Claiborne Farm in Paris, Kentucky. Expectations were initially moderate, and his stud fee dipped to a low of $10,000 in 2011. That same year though, his first crop turned age three and several of them became stakes winners, both in America on dirt and then in Europe on turf. "He started out with more of a reputation as a dirt sire", said Walker Hancock, president of Claiborne. "It wasn't until he had two winners at Royal Ascot (Declaration of War and War Command) on the same day that he got dubbed a turf sire."

Thanks in part to the support of Coolmore Stud, he started attracting better quality mares and his stud fee steadily increased. His stud fee for 2018 and 2019 was $250,000 (increased from $200,000 for 2016 and $150,000 for 2015 and 2014). This was tied for the highest fees in North America for 2019 and is among the highest in the world.

However, by 2025 his standing fee had been lowered from $100,000 to $75,000. He was retired from stud following the 2026 breeding season, during which he stood for a private fee.

=== Notable progeny ===
His most notable progeny so far are:

c = colt, f = filly, g = gelding

| Foaled | Name | Sex | Major Wins |
| 2008 | Data Link | c | Maker's Mark Mile Stakes |
| 2008 | Summer Soiree | f | Del Mar Oaks |
| 2008 | Sweet Orange (Note: Sweet Orange raced as Warning Flag in Ireland before he was exported to Hong Kong in 2011) | c | Hong Kong Classic Mile (HK) |
| 2008 | The Factor | c | Pat O'Brien Handicap, Malibu Stakes |
| 2009 | Declaration of War | c | Queen Anne Stakes, International Stakes |
| 2010 | Helene Super Star (Note: Helene Super Star raced as Lines of Battle in Ireland, UAE and US. He was sold to Hong Kong and renamed) | c | Hong Kong Champions & Chater Cup (HK) |
| 2010 | Jack Milton | c | Maker's Mark Mile Stakes |
| 2011 | War Command | c | Dewhurst Stakes |
| 2012 | Avenge | f | Rodeo Drive Stakes |
| 2012 | Peace and War | f | Alcibiades Stakes |
| 2013 | Air Force Blue | c | Phoenix Stakes, National Stakes, Dewhurst Stakes |
| 2013 | American Patriot | c | Maker's Mark Mile Stakes |
| 2013 | Hit It A Bomb | c | Breeders' Cup Juvenile Turf |
| 2014 | Brave Anna | f | Cheveley Park Stakes |
| 2014 | Homesman | g | Underwood Stakes, Australian Cup |
| 2014 | Lancaster Bomber | c | Tattersalls Gold Cup |
| 2014 | Roly Poly | f | Falmouth Stakes, Prix Rothschild, Sun Chariot Stakes |
| 2015 | Civil Union | f | Flower Bowl Stakes |
| 2015 | U S Navy Flag | c | Middle Park Stakes, Dewhurst Stakes, July Cup |
| 2016 | Fog of War | c | Summer Stakes (Canada) |
| 2016 | Halladay | c | Fourstardave Handicap |
| 2016 | Omaha Beach | c | Arkansas Derby, Santa Anita Sprint Championship, Malibu Stakes |
| 2016 | War of Will | c | Preakness Stakes, Maker's Mark Mile Stakes |
| 2019 | Annapolis | c | Coolmore Turf Mile Stakes |
| 2019 | Fort Washington | c | Arlington Million |

== Pedigree ==
Pedigree of War Front, bay stallion, 2002
| Sire Danzig (USA) b. 1977 | Northern Dancer (CAN) b. 1961 | Nearctic br. 1954 | Nearco |
| Sire Danzig (USA) b. 1977 | Northern Dancer (CAN) b. 1961 | Nearctic br. 1954 | Lady Angela |
| Sire Danzig (USA) b. 1977 | Northern Dancer (CAN) b. 1961 | Natalma b. 1957 | Native Dancer |
| Sire Danzig (USA) b. 1977 | Northern Dancer (CAN) b. 1961 | Natalma b. 1957 | Almahmoud |
| Sire Danzig (USA) b. 1977 | Pas de Nom (USA) b. 1968 | Admiral's Voyage b. 1959 | Crafty Admiral |
| Sire Danzig (USA) b. 1977 | Pas de Nom (USA) b. 1968 | Admiral's Voyage b. 1959 | Olympia Lou |
| Sire Danzig (USA) b. 1977 | Pas de Nom (USA) b. 1968 | Petitioner b. 1952 | Petition |
| Sire Danzig (USA) b. 1977 | Pas de Nom (USA) b. 1968 | Petitioner b. 1952 | Steady Aim |
| Dam Starry Dreamer (USA) gr. 1994 | Rubiano (USA) gr. 1987 | Fappiano b. 1977 | Mr. Prospector |
| Dam Starry Dreamer (USA) gr. 1994 | Rubiano (USA) gr. 1987 | Fappiano b. 1977 | Killaloe |
| Dam Starry Dreamer (USA) gr. 1994 | Rubiano (USA) gr. 1987 | Ruby Slippers gr. 1982 | Nijinsky |
| Dam Starry Dreamer (USA) gr. 1994 | Rubiano (USA) gr. 1987 | Ruby Slippers gr. 1982 | Moon Glitter |
| Dam Starry Dreamer (USA) gr. 1994 | Lara's Star (USA) b. 1981 | Forli ch. 1963 | Aristophanes |
| Dam Starry Dreamer (USA) gr. 1994 | Lara's Star (USA) b. 1981 | Forli ch. 1963 | Trevisa |
| Dam Starry Dreamer (USA) gr. 1994 | Lara's Star (USA) b. 1981 | True Reality b. 1973 | Round Table |
| Dam Starry Dreamer (USA) gr. 1994 | Lara's Star (USA) b. 1981 | True Reality b. 1973 | Secret Promise |

Note: b. = Bay, br. = Brown, ch. = Chestnut, gr. = Gray
