= Anthony S. Black =

American horse jockey (born 1951)

Tony Black
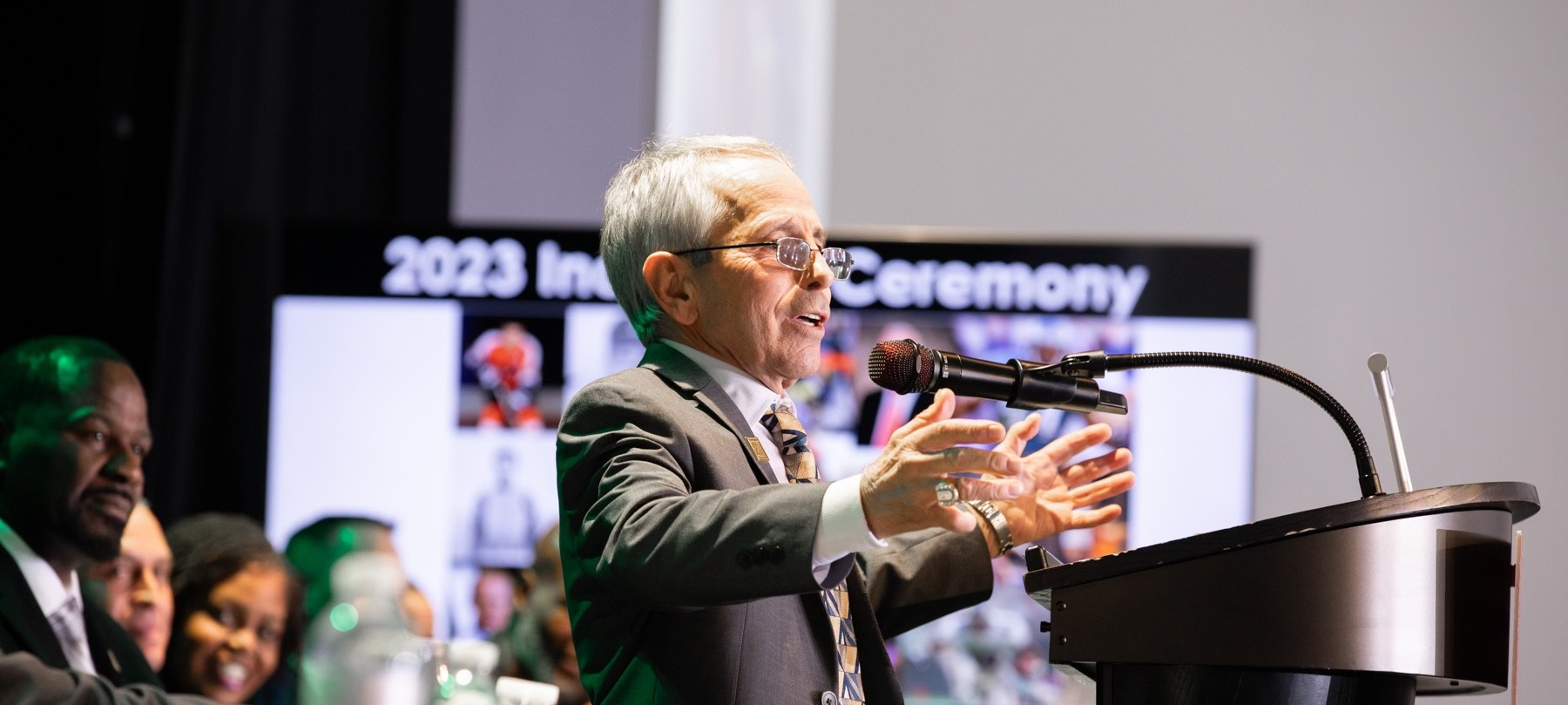

Personal information
- Born: September 4, 1951 (age 74) Mt. Holly, New Jersey, United States
- Occupation: Jockey

Horse racing career
- Sport: Horse racing
- Career wins: 5,211

Major racing wins
- Vosburgh Handicap (1976); Villager Stakes (1976); Cotillion Stakes (1977); Michigan Mile And One-Eighth Handicap (1977); Selima Stakes (1978); Ashland Stakes (1979); John B. Campbell Handicap (1982); Paterson Handicap (1992); Cherry Hill Mile Stakes (1993, 1996); Longfellow Handicap (1995); Morven Stakes 1995); Oceanport Handicap (1995); Pennsylvania Derby (1996); Philadelphia Park Breeders' Cup Handicap (2002); Leonard Richards Stakes (2003)

Significant horses
- Candy Éclair, My Juliet, What a Summer
- Updated on March 19, 2013

Anthony S. "Tony" Black (born September 4, 1951) is an American jockey in Thoroughbred horse racing. He is a nephew of U.S. Racing Hall of Fame jockey and New Jersey state steward, Sam Boulmetis Sr.

He was raised in Haddon Township, New Jersey, where he has been a longtime resident, and attended Haddon Township High School, graduating in the class of 1970.

Black won his first race at Liberty Bell Park Racetrack in Philadelphia, Pennsylvania, on June 15, 1970. At Philadelphia Park (now Parx Casino and Racing) on May 1, 2006, the 54-year-old Black became only the 21st jockey in North American racing history to win 5,000 races.

Black is also a co-holder of the North American record for most consecutive wins by a jockey, tying Albert Adams' 63-year-old record set on July 30, 1993. Black won three back to back to back rides races at the Atlantic City Race Course, followed by two straight at Philadelphia Park on July 31 and another four in a row that same day back at Atlantic City.

Black won his 5,200th career race in the ninth race at Parx on March 18, 2013, aboard Smart Tori, a horse owned by his son. Black had previously indicated that he would retire as a jockey after reaching that milestone.

== Year-end charts ==
Chart (2001–present)	Peak position
National Earnings List for Jockeys 2001	68
National Earnings List for Jockeys 2002	48
National Earnings List for Jockeys 2003	68
