= Morven Stakes =

- Class: Discontinued stakes
- Location: Meadowlands Racetrack, East Rutherford, New Jersey; United States
- Inaugurated: 1978
- Race type: Thoroughbred - Flat racing

Race information
- Distance: 5/8 mile (5 furlongs)
- Surface: Turf
- Track: Left-handed
- Qualification: Two-year-olds
- Purse: $50,000

The Morven Stakes was an American Thoroughbred horse race run between 1978 and 2001 at Meadowlands Racetrack in East Rutherford, New Jersey. A race on turf for two-year-old horses or either sex, it was last run over a distance of five furlongs (5/8 mile).

== Historical notes ==
From inception in 1978 through 1998, the event was run on dirt. Its first two editions were run as the Morven Handicap. By 1984 the race had earned Grade 3 status which it maintained through 1987.

Future Hall of Fame jockey Angel Cordero Jr. won the 1979 and 1982 runnings of the Morven Stakes. Cordero was aboard Fappiano to win the December 20, 1979 when cold weather had frozen the racetrack surface. However, in spite of the difficult racing conditions, Fappiano broke the Meadowlands track record for six furlongs with a time of 1:08 3/5.

The only filly to win the Morven Stakes was Clever Power in 1987. Ridden by future Hall of Fame inductee, Kent Desormeaux, she won easily by four lengths for owner Sondra Bender.

== Records ==
Speed record:

- 0:57 4/5 @ 5 furlongs on turf: Numbers Man (2001)
- 1:08 3/5 @ 6 furlongs on dirt: Fappiano (1979)

Most wins by a jockey:

- 2 - Angel Cordero Jr. (1979, 1982)
- 2 - Shaun Bridgmohan (1998, 2000)

Most wins by a trainer:

- no trainer won this race more than once.

Most wins by an owner:

- 2 - Sondra D. Bender (1987, 1992)

== Winners ==
Year	Winner	Age	Jockey	Trainer	Owner	Dist. (Miles)	Time	Win $	Gr.
2001	Numbers Man	2	José Vélez Jr.	Edwin T. Broome	Richard Malouf	5 f (t)	0:57.80	$50,000	L/R
2000	Unchained Storm	2	Shaun Bridgmohan	Mark E. Casse	Harry T. Mangurian Jr.	5 f (t)	0:58.09	$45,000	B/T
1999	Brilliant Deniro	2	John R. Velazquez	H. Graham Motion	Minranshe Nanbri Stables, Inc.	5 f (t)	0:58.60	$45,000	B/T
1998	Shadow Caster	2	Shaun Bridgmohan	Charles Assimakopoulos	Gatsas Thoroughbreds LLC	6 f (d)	1:10.74	$60,000	B/T
1997	Unreal Madness	2	Chuck Lopez	Edward T. Allard	Gilbert G. Campbell	6 f (d)	1:10.32	$35,000	B/T
1996	Hoop Coyote Hoop	2	William S. Klinke	Cathleen J. Rera	Jeannette Lupoli	6 f (d)	1:10.60	$40,000	B/T
1995	In Contention	2	Anthony Black	Cynthia G. Reese	Noreen Carpenito	6 f (d)	1:10.32	$35,000	B/T
1994	Highest Yield	2	Edwin L. King Jr.	Daniel Perlsweig	Guy H. Burt	6 f (d)	1:09.88	$60,000	B/T
1943	Race not held								
1992	Secret Odds	2	Larry Saumell	Lawrence E. Murray	Sondra D. Bender	6 f (d)	1:10.80	$60,000	B/T
1991	Pas by Pas	2	Chris Antley	James H. Iselin	Robert Kaufman	6 f (d)	1:09.77	$60,000	B/T
1990	Ole Grumby	2	Mike E. Smith	Glenn L. Hild	Sharon Hild	6 f (d)	1:10.80	$35,000	UGS
1989	Housebuster	2	Art Madrid Jr.	Ronald L. Benshoff	Robert P. Levy	6 f (d)	1:09.80	$25,000	UGS
1943	Race not held								
1987	Clever Power	2	Kent Desormeaux	Marvin L. Moncrief	Sondra D. Bender	6 f (d)	1:10.00	$50,000	G3
1986	Great Smoke	2	Rafael Arroyave	John E. Salzman Sr.	Guy P. Snowden	6 f (d)	1:11.60	$50,000	G3
1985	Georgia Bird Dog	2	José A. Santos	Norman R. Pointer	Thoroughbred Racing Stable	6 f (d)	1:11.40	$50,000	G3
1984	Medieval Love	2	William J. Passmore	Robert L. Wheeler	Napton Hill Farm	6 f (d)	1:12.60	$50,000	G3
1983	Fortunate Prospect	2	Buck Thornburg	LeRoy Jolley	Philip Pender, et al.	6 f (d)	1:10.60	$50,000	L/R
1982	Game Dancer	2	Angel Cordero Jr.	John P. Campo	W. Gaston Caperton III	6 f (d)	1:12.00	$40,000	UGS
1981	Grey Bucket	2	Richard Migliore	Stephen A. DiMauro	Akuma Stable	6 f (d)	1:11.00	$50,000	UGS
1980	Triocala	2	Ruben Hernandez	Frank "Pancho" Martin	Viola Sommer	6 f (d)	1:11.40	$50,000	UGS
1979	Fappiano	2	Angel Cordero Jr.	Jan H. Nerud	John A. Nerud	6 f (d)	1:08.60	$50,000	UGS
1978	Terrific Son	2	Vincent Bracciale Jr.	Anthony J. Delloso	Jacques Zinman	6 f (d)	1:11.40	$50,000	UGS
