= Henryk de Kwiatkowski =

Soldier, engineer and race horse owner

- Born: February 22, 1924; Poznań, Poland
- Died: March 17, 2003 (aged 79); Lyford Cay, Bahamas
- Occupations: Aircraft sales/leasing, Racehorse owner/breeder, Polo player, Art collector
- Known for: Calumet Farm
- Board member of: De Kwiatkowski Aircraft Ltd., Intercontinental Aircraft Ltd.
- Spouse(s): 1) Lynne Burke Sawdon; 2) Barbara Tanner Allen
- Children: 7

Henryk Richard de Kwiatkowski (February 22, 1924 – March 17, 2003) was a Polish-born member of the Royal Air Force who became an aeronautical engineer, made a fortune in business in North America, and who owned Calumet Farm, one of the most prestigious thoroughbred horse breeding and racing farms in the United States, which throughout its history of over 87 years, has produced some of the greatest Thoroughbred horses of all time.

== Biography ==
=== Early life ===
Born in Poznań, Poland, at age 15 Henryk de Kwiatkowski was captured by the Russian Army and sent to a Siberian labor camp. After being imprisoned for two years he escaped and made his way through Iran then to South Africa where in March 1943 he boarded the troopship Empress of Canada heading for England. The ship was torpedoed and sunk by an Italian submarine, but de Kwiatkowski survived and eventually reached England where he joined the Royal Air Force, serving until 1947. According to his son, Henryk de Kwiatkowski was the basis for the character Abel Rosnovski in the Jeffrey Archer novel Kane and Abel.

=== Career ===
After the War, de Kwiatkowski worked at a factory job and put himself through university. In 1952 he emigrated to Canada to work as an engineer at the Pratt & Whitney aircraft company in Montreal. In 1957, he went to the United States where he established Kwiatkowski Aircraft Ltd. and Intercontinental Aircraft Ltd headquartered in New York City making his fortune through leasing and brokering the sale of used commercial airplanes.

In 1967, de Kwiatkowski purchased a home in the exclusive community of Lyford Cay on New Providence Island in The Bahamas that was developed by friend and fellow thoroughbred owner/breeder, E. P. Taylor. He would also acquire a luxury Beekman Place apartment in Manhattan and an 80-acre (320,000 m^{2}) estate in the exclusive gated community of Conyers Farm in Greenwich, Connecticut that included four guest houses and a 22-stall stable. The property was sold by his estate in 2004 for US$45 million.

An art collector who favored the Impressionists, his collection included works by Paul Gauguin, Georges Braque and Claude Monet.

=== Polo ===
Kwiatkowski began playing the sport of polo. His Kennelot Stables in Greenwich, Connecticut operated a polo team on which he played. He was also a member and player with the Palm Beach Polo and Country Club in Wellington, Florida. Along with Canadian retailing magnate Galen Weston and American actress Stefanie Powers, Henryk de Kwiatkowski was among the first foreign members of the Royal County of Berkshire Polo Club, Windsor, Berkshire whose membership includes the Prince of Wales.

=== Thoroughbred horse racing ===
De Kwiatkowski's involvement in horse racing began in 1977 when he acquired two 2yo fillies, Noiritza and Sunwing, through his friend Rhydian Morgan-Jones following a meeting in Annabel's nightclub. Trained by Irishman Mick O'Toole they both came second at the Royal meeting. However he switched his interest to the United StatesIn when he acquired the filly Kennelot who became the foundation for his racing and breeding business and for whom he named his stables in Greenwich, Connecticut. At its peak, Kennelot Stables owned more than 60 horses. De Kwiatkowski bought the stallion Danzig but constant health problems forced the horse into retirement after winning the three races entered. However, Danzig became one of North America's most successful sires. De Kwiatkowski owned Conquistador Cielo, the Belmont Stakes winner and 1982 Horse of the Year who was syndicated for a then record price of $36.4 million. Among his other horses were 1985 Kentucky Derby runner-up Stephan's Odyssey, Danzig Connection who won the 1986 Belmont Stakes and Sabin, a multiple Grade I stakes-winning filly that won 18 of her 25 starts.

At a 1992 liquidation auction, de Kwiatkowski purchased the fabled 770-acre (3.1 km^{2}) racing and breeding facilities of Calumet Farm in Lexington, Kentucky. In addition to the $17 million for the main property, he acquired another 30 acres (120,000 m^{2}) for $175,000, and the Calumet name for $210,000. Following de Kwiatkowski's death at his home in Lyford Cay in 2003, John Asher, a spokesman for Churchill Downs said: "He did a lot of things in thoroughbred racing, but saving Calumet Farm was something the industry will be eternally indebted to him for."
