= Barbara Allen de Kwiatkowski =

American socialite (1951–2020)

- Born: 1951; New Mexico
- Died: June 8, 2020 (aged 68–69)
- Other names: Barbara Tanner; Barbara Tanner Allen; Barbara de Kwiatkowski
- Occupations: model, actor, journalist
- Known for: associate of Andy Warhol
- Spouse(s): Joseph Allen Henryk de Kwiatkowski (m. 1989; died 2003)
- Children: Nicholas

Barbara Allen de Kwiatkowski (née Tanner) was a model, journalist, and socialite. She is also known as an associate of Andy Warhol, working with him on Interview magazine.

== Life and career ==
She was born in 1951, in New Mexico, but moved to the United Kingdom that year when her father, an officer with the USAF was posted there. Kwiatkowski describes growing up British. However her family later moved to Paris, when her father was posted to France.

She married Joseph Allen, described then as a "newsprint entrepreneur", when she was 19 and he was 29. Allen bought a share of Interview, which he put in Barbara's name, "so she would have something to do". Fran Liebowitz, also an associate of Warhol, said her marriage to Allen was essentially over, after Barbara joined the Warhol entourage.

After joining the Warhol entourage, and starting a career in modeling, Barbara became someone whose partying became noteworthy.

During the next decade, in addition to working with Warhol, Barbara modeled, tried appearing in movies, and rebuffed many ardent admirers. In the mid-1970s she was the girlfriend of Peter Beard, a celebrated photographer. She described one incident where, early one morning, Mick Jagger tried to sneak in her bedroom window, only to sneak into the window of Beard's bedroom. She said the three of them had a good laugh over Jagger's misadventure. In another account Jagger snuck into the window of houseguest Bob Colacello. Other boyfriends and admirers from this period included Taki Theodoracopulos, Philip Niarchos, Ilie Nastase and Warren Beatty.

After an eight-year courtship, she married Henryk de Kwiatkowski in 1989. Henryk was a wealthy Canadian aircraft broker. He was 31 years older than she was. The couple were married until he died in 2003. Their son, Nicholas, was born in 1988.

Barbara appears 73 times in The Andy Warhol Diaries, which was released in 1989, and contains many embarrassing details. She described how Henryk's grown children from his first marriage were shocked, and showed the diaries' account of Barbara's wild times to their father. She said he told her he didn't care.

The New York Times profiled her again, in August 2019, when she put the 5,000 square foot Manhattan apartment she had shared with her husband up for sale. The article noted that, while she and her husband had used the apartment's large spaces to host parties attended by "bold-face names", she now lived a more retired life-style, and would be more comfortable in a smaller space.

She died, of natural causes, at age 69, on June 8, 2020.

On November 2, 2020, Christie's auction house announced that they would be in charge of auctioning off her collections of art, jewelry and clothing.
