= Air Force Blue =

American-bred Thoroughbred racehorse

- Racing sils of Sue Magnier
- Sire: War Front
- Grandsire: Danzig
- Dam: Chatham
- Damsire: Maria's Mon
- Sex: Colt
- Foaled: 2 May 2013
- Country: United States
- Colour: Bay
- Breeder: Stone Farm
- Owner: Michael Tabor, Derrick Smith and Sue Magnier
- Trainer: Aidan O'Brien
- Record: 9: 4-1-0
- Earnings: £566,265

Major wins
- Phoenix Stakes (2015); National Stakes (2015); Dewhurst Stakes (2015)

Awards
- Cartier Champion Two-year-old Colt (2015); Top-rated European two-year-old (2015)

Air Force Blue (foaled 2 May 2013) is an American-bred, Irish-trained Thoroughbred racehorse. As a juvenile in 2015 he established himself as the best two-year-old colt in Europe by recording three consecutive Group One wins in the Phoenix Stakes, National Stakes and Dewhurst Stakes. On his reappearance in 2016 he was unplaced when odds-on favourite for the 2000 Guineas, was well beaten in the Irish 2,000 Guineas on his second start and suffered two further defeats over shorter distances before being retired to stud.

== Background ==
Air Force Blue is a bay horse with no white markings bred in Kentucky by Arthur Hancock's Stone Farm. He was sired by War Front who won the Alfred G. Vanderbilt Handicap in 2006. Since retiring War Front has also sired War Command, Declaration of War, Del Mar Oaks winner Summer Soiree, Hong Kong Classic Mile winner Sweet Orange and Malibu Stakes winner The Factor. Air Force Blue's dam Chatham won three of her sixteen races in the United States between 2006 and 2008. She was a descendant of the American broodmare Furlough, making her a distant relative of One Count, Mrs Penny and Hatoof.

In September 2014 the colt was sent as a yearling to the Keeneland and was bought for $490,000 by M V Magnier acting for his father John Magnier's Coolmore Stud organisation. The colt was sent to Ireland to be trained by Aidan O'Brien at Ballydoyle.

== Racing career ==
=== 2015: two-year-old season ===
Air Force Blue began his racing career in a six furlong maiden race at the Curragh Racecourse on 24 May and started at odds of 4 to 1 in an eleven-runner field. Ridden by Ryan Moore he led from the start, went clear of the field a furlong out and held off the late challenge of Rockaway Valley to win by a neck. The colt was then sent to England and moved up in class for the Group Two Coventry Stakes at Royal Ascot on 16 June. He took the lead a furlong from the finish but was overtaken and beaten two lengths by the Mark Johnston-trained Buratino.

Air Force Blue faced Buratino again in the Group One Phoenix Stakes at the Curragh on 9 August and started 9/4 second favourite behind the English colt. The other five runners included Air Force Blue's stable companions Painted Cliffs (Railway Stakes) and Washington, D.C. (Windsor Castle Stakes) as well as Rockaway Valley. Ridden by his trainer's son Joseph O'Brien he was settled towards the rear of the field before accelerating into the lead a furlong out and drew clear to win by two lengths from Washington, D.C., with Buratino in third. After the race O'Brien commented "He won his maiden here and didn't learn a lot, and was a baby going to Ascot. He settled, travelled and quickened up well today, and he was very professional. He put it to bed very quickly and he galloped out well".

On 13 September Air Force Blue returned to the Curragh and started 10/11 favourite for the Vincent O'Brien National Stakes over seven furlongs. Painted Cliffs was again in opposition, but more serious opposition appeared to come from the other three runners: Herald The Dawn (Futurity Stakes), Birchwood (Superlative Stakes) and Final Frontier (Anglesey Stakes). Joseph O'Brien tracked the leaders before taking the lead a furlong out and Air Force Blue went clear in the closing stages to win by three lengths from Herald The Dawn. O'Brien said "He's a very good horse. He has speed and travels. We were a bit worried about the trip in the ground today but it proved to be no problem.... I had no worries on him. He's a big scopey horse and we think he's a little bit special".

For his final race of the year, Air Force Blue was sent to England for the second time and started 4/6 favourite for the Group One Dewhurst Stakes at Newmarket Racecourse on 10 October. His main rival appeared to be Emotionless from the Godolphin stable who had been an impressive winner of the Champagne Stakes, whilst the other four runners included Sanus Per Aquam (Somerville Tattersall Stakes) and Tashweek (Flying Scotsman Stakes). After tracking the leaders Ryan Moore sent Air Force Blue into the lead a furlong from the finish and the colt broke away from his opponents to win by three and a quarter lengths from the 20/1 outsider Massaat with Sanus Per Aquam two and three quarter lengths back in third.

On 10 November 2015, Air Force Blue was named Cartier Champion Two-year-old Colt at the 25th edition of the Cartier Racing Awards. In January Air Force Blue was officially rated the best European two-year-old of 2015. His mark of 124 placed him three pounds ahead of Shalaa and four pounds ahead of the filly Minding.

=== 2016: three-year-old season ===
Air Force Blue's first target as a three-year-old was the 2000 Guineas at Newmarket on 30 April. He started the 4/5 favourite against twelve opponents but after tracking the leaders he began to struggle a quarter of a mile from the finish and quickly dropped back to finish twelfth behind Galileo Gold. Three weeks later he faced Galileo Gold again in the Irish 2,000 Guineas at the Curragh and started 4/1 second favourite. He was towards the rear throughout the race and finished seventh of the eight runners behind Awtaad. For his next race Air Force Blue was dropped back in distance to six furlongs for the July Cup but finished well-beaten in twelfth place of the eighteen runners. He was subsequently dropped in class for the Group 3 Phoenix Sprint Stakes at The Curragh in August but again ran well below his juvenile form and finished last of the seven runners, eleven lengths behind the sixth-placed horse.

== Stud record ==
Air Force Blue was retired from racing in September 2016 to stand as a breeding stallion at Ashford Stud in Versailles, Kentucky.

== Pedigree ==
Pedigree of Air Force Blue, bay colt, 2013
Sire War Front (USA) 2002	Danzig (USA); 1977	Northern Dancer	Nearctic
Sire War Front (USA) 2002	Danzig (USA); 1977	Northern Dancer	Natalma
Sire War Front (USA) 2002	Danzig (USA); 1977	Pas de Nom	Admiral's Voyage
Sire War Front (USA) 2002	Danzig (USA); 1977	Pas de Nom	Petitioner
Sire War Front (USA) 2002	Starry Dreamer (USA); 1994	Rubiano	Fappiano
Sire War Front (USA) 2002	Starry Dreamer (USA); 1994	Rubiano	Ruby Slippers
Sire War Front (USA) 2002	Starry Dreamer (USA); 1994	Lara's Star	Forli
Sire War Front (USA) 2002	Starry Dreamer (USA); 1994	Lara's Star	True Reality
Dam Chatham (USA) 2004	Maria's Mon (USA); 1993	Wavering Monarch	Majestic Light
Dam Chatham (USA) 2004	Maria's Mon (USA); 1993	Wavering Monarch	Uncommitted
Dam Chatham (USA) 2004	Maria's Mon (USA); 1993	Carlotta Maria	Caro
Dam Chatham (USA) 2004	Maria's Mon (USA); 1993	Carlotta Maria	Water Malone
Dam Chatham (USA) 2004	Circle of Gold (USA); 1999	Seeking the Gold	Mr. Prospector
Dam Chatham (USA) 2004	Circle of Gold (USA); 1999	Seeking the Gold	Con Game
Dam Chatham (USA) 2004	Circle of Gold (USA); 1999	Starlet Storm	Storm Bird
Dam Chatham (USA) 2004	Circle of Gold (USA); 1999	Starlet Storm	Cinegita (Family: 25)
