= Albany Stakes (Great Britain) =

Flat horse race in Britain

- Class: Group 3
- Location: Ascot Racecourse; Ascot, England
- Inaugurated: 2002
- Race type: Flat / Thoroughbred
- Website: Ascot

Race information
- Distance: 6f (1,207 metres)
- Surface: Turf
- Track: Straight
- Qualification: Two-year-old fillies
- Weight: 9 st 2 lb
- Purse: £100,000 (2022); 1st: £59,200

Albany Stakes
2026
Libertango	Sun Goddess	Light Of Dawn

Previous years
2025
Venetian Sun	Awaken	Balantina
2024
Fairy Godmother	Simmering	Heavens Gate
2023
Porta Fortuna	Matrika	Soprano
2022
Meditate	Mawj	Ivory Madonna
2021
Sandrine	Hello You	Oscula

2020-2011
2020
Dandalla	Setarhe	Mother Earth
2019
Daahyeh	Celtic Beauty	Aroha
2018
Main Edition	La Pelosa	Fairyland
2017
Different League	Alpha Centauri	Take Me With You
2016
Brave Anna	Bletchley	Queen Kindly
2015
Illuminate	Ashadihan	Elegant Supermodel
2014
Cursory Glance	Sunset Glow	Patience Alexander
2013
Kiyoshi	Sandiva	Joyeuse
2012
Newfangled	Agent Allison	Premier Steps
2011
Samitar	Inetrobil	Illaunglass

2010-2002
2010
Memory	Margot Did	Tiz My Time
2009
Habaayib	Lillie Langtry	Chachamaidee
2008
Cuis Ghaire	Penny's Gift	Danidh Dubai
2007
Nijoom Dubai	You'resothrilling	Baffled
2006
Sander Camillo	Silk Blossom	Scarlet Runner
2005
La Chunga	Vague	Rumplestiltskin
2004
Jewel In The Sand	Spirit of Chester	Salsa Brava
2003
Silca's Gift	Tolzey	Malaica
2002
Duty Paid	Luvah Girl	Pearl Dance

The Albany Stakes is a Group 3 flat horse race in Great Britain open to two-year-old fillies. It is run at Ascot over a distance of 6 furlongs (1,207 metres), and it is scheduled to take place each year in June.

The event was established in 2002, and it was initially classed at Listed level and run as the Henry Carnavon Stakes in memory of Henry Herbert, 7th Earl of Carnarvon, Queen Elizabeth II's racing manager, who had died in September 2001. It was first run under its present title in 2003 and was promoted to Group 3 status in 2005.

The race is currently held on the fourth day of the five-day Royal Ascot meeting.

== Records ==
Leading jockey (4 wins):

- Jamie Spencer – La Chunga (2005), Nijoom Dubai (2007), Samitar (2011), Kiyoshi (2013)

Leading trainer (3 wins):

- Mick Channon – Silca's Gift (2003), Nijoom Dubai (2007), Samitar (2011)
- Aidan O'Brien - Brave Anna (2016), Mediate (2022), Fairy Godmother (2024)

== Winners ==
Year	Winner	Jockey	Trainer	Time
2002	Duty Paid	Richard Quinn	David Elsworth	1:15.90
2003	Silca's Gift	Steve Drowne	Mick Channon	1:15.66
2004	Jewel in the Sand	Richard Hughes	Richard Hannon Sr.	1:16.13
2005 (Note: The 2005 running took place at York)	La Chunga	Jamie Spencer	Jeremy Noseda	1:10.35
2006	Sander Camillo	Frankie Dettori	Jeremy Noseda	1:14.27
2007	Nijoom Dubai	Jamie Spencer	Mick Channon	1:15.55
2008	Cuis Ghaire	Kevin Manning	Jim Bolger	1:15.72
2009	Habaayib	Richard Hills	Ed Dunlop	1:15.63
2010	Memory	Richard Hughes	Richard Hannon Sr.	1:13.70
2011	Samitar	Jamie Spencer	Mick Channon	1:15.93
2012	Newfangled	William Buick	John Gosden	1:16.78
2013	Kiyoshi	Jamie Spencer	Charles Hills	1:13.82
2014	Cursory Glance	Andrea Atzeni	Roger Varian	1:13.85
2015	Illuminate	Richard Hughes	Richard Hannon Jr.	1:13.20
2016	Brave Anna	Seamie Heffernan	Aidan O'Brien	1:15.20
2017	Different League	Antoine Hamelin	Matthieu Palussiere	1:14.60
2018	Main Edition	James Doyle	Mark Johnston	1:13.67
2019	Daahyeh	David Egan	Roger Varian	1:14.05
2020	Dandalla	Ben Curtis	Karl Burke	1:16.38
2021	Sandrine	David Probert	Andrew Balding	1:18.00
2022	Meditate	Ryan Moore	Aidan O'Brien	1:14.38
2023	Porta Fortuna	Frankie Dettori	Donnacha O'Brien	1:13.97
2024	Fairy Godmother	Ryan Moore	Aidan O'Brien	1:13.48
2025	Venetian Sun	Clifford Lee	Karl Burke	1:12.87
2026	Libertango	Billy Loughnane	George Boughey	1:13.12

== See also ==
- Horse racing in Great Britain
- List of British flat horse races
