= War Command =

American-bred Thoroughbred racehorse

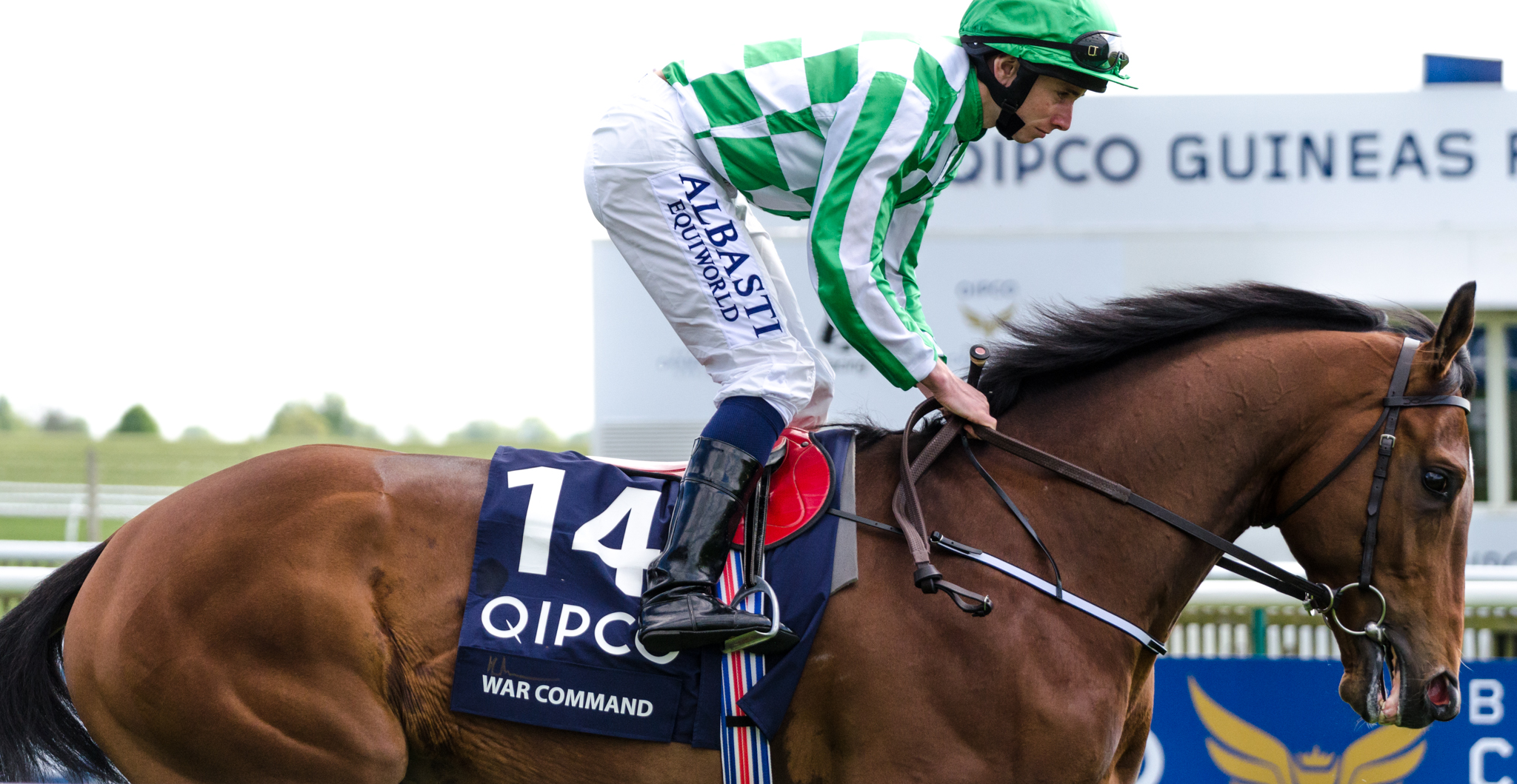
- War Command at the 2014 2000 Guineas.
- Sire: War Front
- Grandsire: Danzig
- Dam: Wandering Star
- Damsire: Red Ransom
- Sex: Colt
- Foaled: 27 April 2011
- Country: United States
- Colour: Bay
- Breeder: Joseph Allen
- Owner: Joseph Allen; Mrs John Magnier; Michael Tabor; Derrick Smith
- Trainer: Aidan O'Brien
- Jockey: Joseph O'Brien; Seamie Heffernan; Ryan Moore
- Record: 8: 4-0-1
- Earnings: £389,364

Major wins
- Coventry Stakes (2013); Futurity Stakes (2013); Dewhurst Stakes (2013)

War Command (foaled 27 April 2011) is an American-bred, Irish-trained Thoroughbred racehorse. As a two-year-old he won the Coventry Stakes at Royal Ascot by six lengths and then won the Futurity Stakes, before going on to record his first Group 1 win in the Dewhurst Stakes. In his first run as a three-year-old he finished down the field in the 2000 Guineas. He was subsequently beaten in two other Group One races as a three-year-old before being retired to stud where he has proved a successful young sire. In his racing career he was trained by Aidan O'Brien and owned by Joseph Allen, Mrs John Magnier, Michael Tabor and Derrick Smith.

== Background ==
War Command is a bay colt with a white star bred by Joseph Allen and foaled on 27 April 2011. He was sired by War Front who won the Alfred G. Vanderbilt Handicap in 2006. Since retiring he has also sired Queen Anne and International Stakes winner Declaration of War, Del Mar Oaks winner Summer Soiree and Malibu Stakes winner The Factor. War Command's dam is Wandering Star, a daughter of Red Ransom, who won the Atalanta Stakes and E. P. Taylor Stakes in 1996. The colt is trained by Aidan O'Brien.

== Racing career ==
=== 2013: Two-year-old season ===
War Command's first start came on 7 June 2013 in a seven-furlong maiden race at Leopardstown, which he won by a neck from the pre-race favourite Intensified. Eleven days later War Command travelled to Royal Ascot for the Coventry Stakes. He was an outsider for the race and started at the price of 20/1, with his trained Aidan O'Brien also having two more fancied runners in the colts Stubbs and Sir John Hawkins. War Command's jockey Seamie Heffernan, held him up near the rear of the field in the early stages of the race, before moving closer to the leaders with two furlongs left to run. He took the lead with over one furlong before the finish and pulled clear to win by six lengths from Parbold. War Command's stable-mate Sir John Hawkins finished three quarters of a length behind Parbold in third place. After the performance he was priced as short as 5/1 for the 2014 running of the 2000 Guineas Stakes.

War Command then stepped up to Group 1 level for the Phoenix Stakes at The Curragh. He started as the 2/5 favourite of the field of five. Ridden by Joseph O'Brien, he could only manage to finish third, one length behind winner Sudirman. War Command returned to The Curragh on 24 August for the Futurity Stakes. After again starting as an odds-on favourite he took the lead inside the final furlong and pulled clear to win by three lengths from Mustajeeb.

On 12 October, War Command was sent back to England to contest Britain's most prestigious two-year-old race, the Dewhurst Stakes over seven furlongs at Newmarket Racecourse. Ridden by Joseph O'Brien, he started the 10/11 favourite against a field which included the July Stakes winner Anjaal and the Champagne Stakes winner Outstrip. He raced behind the leaders before taking the lead a furlong from the finish and winning by one and a quarter lengths from the 20/1 outsider Cable Bay.

In November, War Command was narrowly defeated by Kingston Hill in the voting for Champion Two-year-old Colt at the Cartier Racing Awards.

=== 2014: Three-year-old season ===
War Command began his three-year-old season in the 2000 Guineas in which he was ridden by Ryan Moore. He entered the race at odds of 8/1 and could only finish ninth of the fourteen runners five and a quarter lengths behind 40/1 winner, Night of Thunder. His next engagement was the St James's Palace Stakes at Royal Ascot, in which he finished fourth behind Kingman, Night of Thunder and Outstrip. In July he was matched against older horses for the first time in the Eclipse Stakes over ten furlong at Sandown Park Racecourse. Starting at odds of 8/1 he finished seventh of the nine runners behind the five-year-old Mukhadram.

== Stud career ==
War Command stands at unknown.

=== Notable Progeny ===
c = colt, f = filly, g = gelding

Foaled	Name	Sex	Major Wins
2017	Kalapour	g	Tancred Stakes

== Pedigree ==
Pedigree of War Command, bay colt, 2011
Sire War Front b. 2002	Danzig b. 1977	Northern Dancer b. 1961	Nearctic
Sire War Front b. 2002	Danzig b. 1977	Northern Dancer b. 1961	Natalma
Sire War Front b. 2002	Danzig b. 1977	Pas de Nom b. 1968	Admiral's Voyage
Sire War Front b. 2002	Danzig b. 1977	Pas de Nom b. 1968	Petitioner
Sire War Front b. 2002	Starry Dreamer gr. 1994	Rubiano gr. 1987	Fappiano
Sire War Front b. 2002	Starry Dreamer gr. 1994	Rubiano gr. 1987	Ruby Slippers
Sire War Front b. 2002	Starry Dreamer gr. 1994	Lara's Star b. 1981	Forli
Sire War Front b. 2002	Starry Dreamer gr. 1994	Lara's Star b. 1981	True Reality
Dam Wandering Star b. 1993	Red Ransom b. 1987	Roberto b. 1969	Hail To Reason
Dam Wandering Star b. 1993	Red Ransom b. 1987	Roberto b. 1969	Bramalea
Dam Wandering Star b. 1993	Red Ransom b. 1987	Arabia b. 1977	Damascus
Dam Wandering Star b. 1993	Red Ransom b. 1987	Arabia b. 1977	Christmas Wind
Dam Wandering Star b. 1993	Beautiful Bedouin b. 1984	His Majesty b. 1968	Ribot
Dam Wandering Star b. 1993	Beautiful Bedouin b. 1984	His Majesty b. 1968	Flower Bowl
Dam Wandering Star b. 1993	Beautiful Bedouin b. 1984	Gris Vitesse gr. 1966	Amerigo
Dam Wandering Star b. 1993	Beautiful Bedouin b. 1984	Gris Vitesse gr. 1966	Matchiche

Note: b. = Bay, gr. = Grey
