= H. Joseph Allen =

American businessman (born 1941)

- Born: July 19, 1941 (age 85); The Bronx, New York, U.S.
- Education: University of Michigan
- Occupations: Businessman: Newsprint production Racehorse owner/breeder
- Spouses: Barbara Tanner (divorced) Rhonda Roland Shearer (divorced)

Joseph Allen (born July 19, 1941) is an American businessman and Thoroughbred racehorse owner and breeder.

== Biography ==
A graduate of the University of Michigan, Allen is a partner with his cousin Peter M. Brant in the privately owned newsprint company, Brant-Allen Industries, Inc, co-founded by their fathers. Allen served as vice chairman and president of the company.

For a number of years Joseph Allen has been involved in Thoroughbred racing and with Peter Brant, owned Just A Game, winner of the 1980 Eclipse Award for American Champion Female Turf Horse. The Grade 1 Just A Game Stakes at Belmont Park is run in her honor.

== Personal life ==
In the early 1970s, at the age of 29, Allen married 19 year old Barbara Tanner. He bought her a 25 percent stake of Andy Warhol's Interview magazine. He later married and divorced Rhonda Roland Shearer.
