= Declaration of War (horse) =

American-bred Thoroughbred racehorse

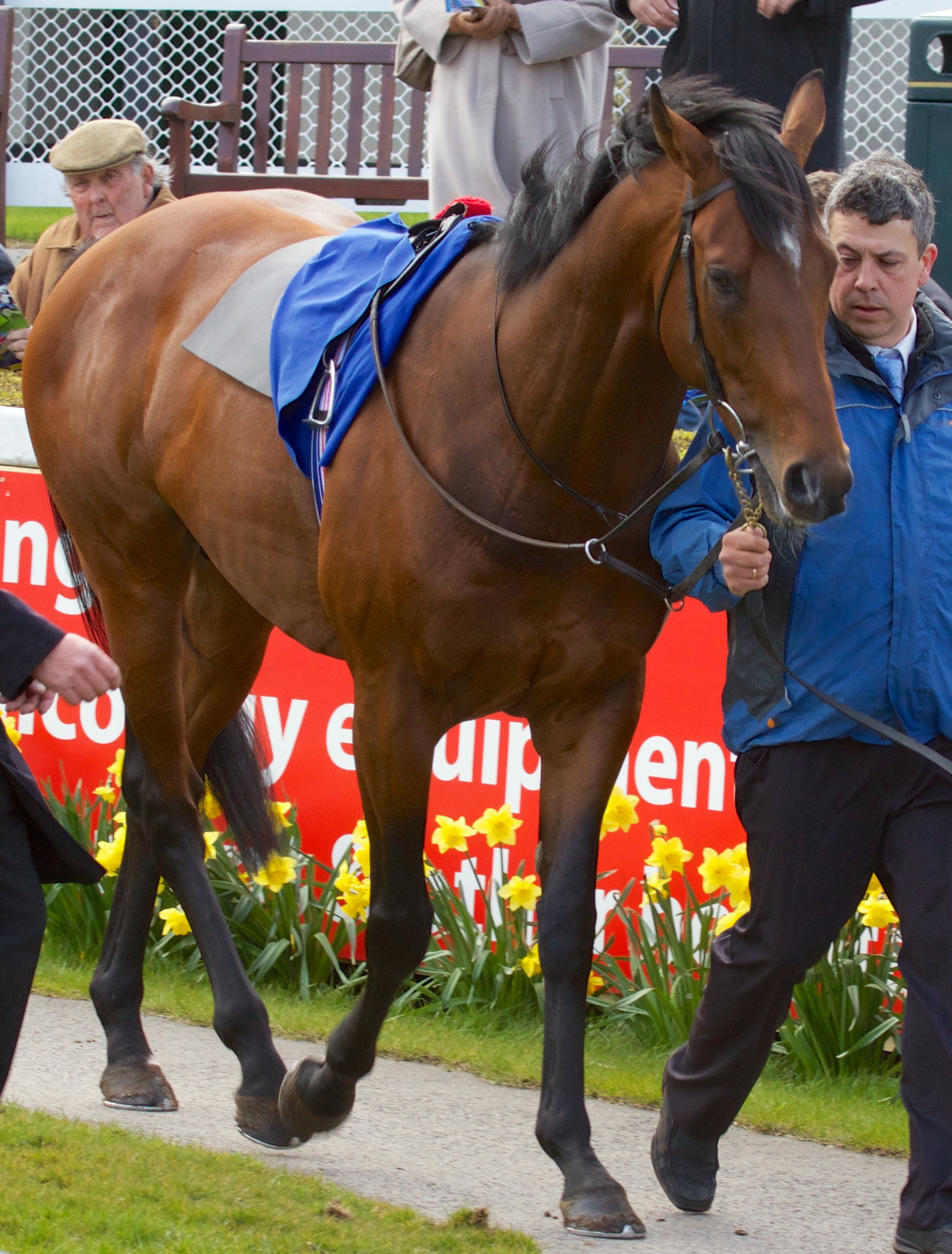
- Declaration of War at Leopardstown in 2013.
- Sire: War Front
- Grandsire: Danzig
- Dam: Tempo West
- Damsire: Rahy
- Sex: Stallion
- Foaled: 29 April 2009
- Country: United States
- Colour: Bay
- Breeder: Joseph Allen
- Owner: Michael Tabor; Derrick Smith; Mrs John Magnier; Joseph Allen
- Trainer: Jean-Claude Rouget; Aidan O'Brien
- Record: 13: 7-1-2
- Earnings: £863,758

Major wins
- Diamond Stakes (2012); Queen Anne Stakes (2013); International Stakes (2013); Heritage Stakes (2013)

Declaration of War (foaled 29 April 2009) is an American-bred, Irish-trained Thoroughbred racehorse. He won the Group Three Diamond Stakes in 2012, but emerged as a world-class performer in the following year, winning the Queen Anne Stakes and International Stakes and being placed in the Eclipse Stakes, Sussex Stakes and Breeders' Cup Classic.

== Background ==
Declaration of War is a bay horse with a white star and a white coronet on his left hind foot, bred by his owner Joseph Allen. He was sired by War Front who won the Alfred G. Vanderbilt Handicap in 2006. Since retiring War Front has also sired War Command, Del Mar Oaks winner Summer Soiree, Hong Kong Classic Mile winner Sweet Orange and Malibu Stakes winner The Factor. Declaration of War's dam Tempo West was descended from Glad Rags, an Irish-bred mare who won the 1000 Guineas in 1966. Other descendants of Glad Rags include the Irish 2,000 Guineas winner Prince of Birds and the Belmont Stakes winners Colonial Affair and Union Rags.

Declaration of War was sent into training in France with Jean-Claude Rouget as a two-year-old.

== Racing career ==
=== 2011 & 2012: early career ===
Declaration of War did not race until November 2011 when he won a minor race over 1700 metres on the all-weather track at Pornichet la Baule. In December he ran in the Prix Habitat over 1500 metres at Deauville Racecourse and won impressively by eight lengths from twelve opponents.

In early 2012 a majority share in Declaration of War was sold to John Magnier's Coolmore Stud organisation and the colt was moved to Ireland to be trained by Aidan O'Brien at Ballydoyle. He did not race for his new trainer until 9 September when he finished fourth behind the Dermot Weld-trained seven-year-old in the Group Three Solonaway Stakes over one mile at the Curragh. Three weeks later he was moved up in distance for a race over ten furlongs on heavy ground at the same course. Ridden by his trainer's son Joseph O'Brien he started the 11/10 favourite and won by 3 1/2 lengths. In October he was moved up to Group Three class for the Diamond Stakes over 10 1/2 furlongs on the Polytrack course at Dundalk Racecourse. Joseph O'Brien restrained the colt at the back of the twelve runner field before switching to the outside in the straight. Declaration of War finished strongly to take the lead in the closing stages and won by half a length from Along Came Casey.

=== 2013: four-year-old season ===
Declaration of War began his third season in the Listed Heritage Stakes over one mile at Leopardstown Racecourse on 14 April and won easily by 2 1/2 lengths from four opponents. For his next race, the colt was sent to the United Kingdom and moved up to Group One class for the Lockinge Stakes at Newbury Racecourse. He was strongly supported in the betting and started the 5/4 favourite, but weakened in the closing stages and finished fifth, more than eleven lengths behind the winner Farhh.

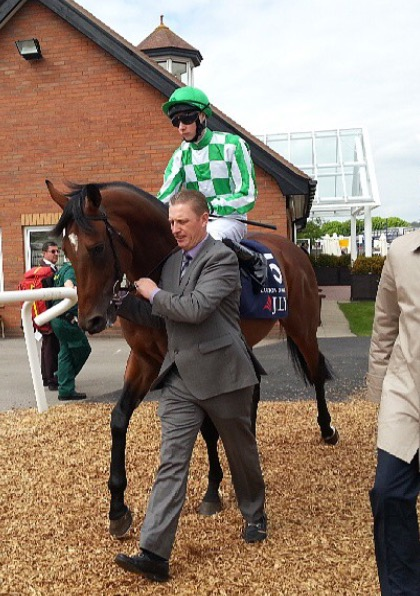
Declaration of War at Newbury

Declaration of War returned to England in June for the Group One Queen Anne Stakes at Royal Ascot where he started at odds of 15/2 with the American-trained five-year-old Animal Kingdom being made the 5/4 favourite. Joseph O'Brien settled the colt just behind the leaders but was unable to obtain a clear run and switched the colt to the left in the last quarter mile. In the final furlong Declaration of War accelerated into the lead and won from Aljamaheer, Gregoran and Elusive Kate. Declaration of War was beaten in his next three races, but ran well on each occasion. He finished second to Al Kazeem in the Eclipse Stakes, third to Toronado and Dawn Approach in the Sussex Stakes and fourth to Moonlight Cloud, Olympic Glory and Intello in the Prix Jacques Le Marois.

On 21 August Declaration of War started at odds of 7/1 for the Juddmonte International Stakes over 10 1/2 furlongs at York Racecourse. Joseph O'Brien tracked the leaders before moving the colt forward in the straight. He took the lead inside the furlongs and won by one and a quarter lengths from Trading Leather and Al Kazeem with Toronado last of the six runners. After the race O'Brien paid tribute to the winner, saying "He has an unbelievable constitution. He's made like a big sprinter, he works with a lot of speed at home, travels very strongly and definitely he's improving. Racing is the thing which is bringing him [on], which is brilliant."

Bookmakers made him the 9/4 favourite for the Irish Champion Stakes but he was withdrawn on the day of the race due to the going. The race was won by The Fugue.

On 2 November, Declaration of War was one of two European runners in the Breeders' Cup Classic at Santa Anita Park. Before Shipping to California he was given a trial gallop on the synthetic surface at Southwell Racecourse and performed very impressively, leading O'Brien to compare him favourably to his 2000 Classic runner up Giant's Causeway. He started at odds of 6.7/1 in a strong field which included Game On Dude (the favorite), Paynter, Palace Malice, Mucho Macho Man, Fort Larned, Will Take Charge and Flat Out. Joseph O'Brien settled the colt behind the leaders, before moving up to make his challenge in the straight. In a closely contested finish he finished third in a three-way photo, beaten a nose and a head by Mucho Macho Man and Will Take Charge.

== Assessment ==
In the 2013 edition of the World's Best Racehorse Rankings Declaration of War was given a rating of 124 making him joint 11th best rated horse in the work, the same as stable mates Magician and St Nicholas Abbey.

== Stud career ==
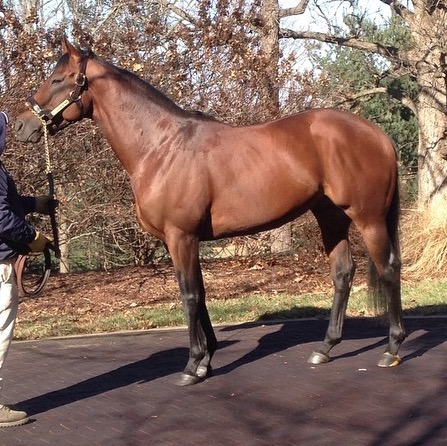
Declaration of War at stud

After the Breeders' Cup Declaration of War was retired and it was announced that he would stand as a stallion at Coolmore stud in County Tipperary in 2014. Declaration of War covered 172 mares in 2014 including a sister to derby winner High Chaparral and Danetime Out the dam of Toormore and Estidhkaar. Later in 2014 he was shuttled to Australia along with fellow first season stallion Camelot for the southern hemisphere breeding season.

In 2015, Declaration of War was moved to stand at Ashford Stud in Kentucky.

The filly foal, Countess Chrissy was born on 29 December 2014. She is unraced and a broodmare. Her dam, Monzza (by Montjeu ex Zee Zee Top) was in the Tattersalls December Sales 2014. Catalogue states that Monzza had last been covered by Declaration Of War on the 12 February 2014.

His first colt foal, Boston T Party out of the Pivotal mare Sri Kandi, was born 7 January 2015.

Declaration of War was represented by his first winner on May 8, 2017, in England, when colt Declarationoflove won a five-furlong Novice Stakes.

Filly Actress became Declaration of War's first graded stakes winner in July 2017, when she won the Group 3 Anglesey Stakes at the Curragh, defeating colts.

=== Notable progeny ===
Declaration of War Group/Grade 1 winners:

c = colt, f = filly, g = gelding

Foaled	Name	Sex	Major Wins
2015	Vow And Declare	g	Melbourne Cup
2015	Olmedo	c	Poule d'Essai des Poulains
2015	Winning Ways	f	Queensland Oaks
2016	Warning	g	Victoria Derby
2017	Decorated Invader	c	Summer Stakes (Canada)
2017	Gufo	c	Belmont Derby; Sword Dancer Stakes (twice)
2018	Fire At Will	c	Breeders' Cup Juvenile Turf

== Pedigree ==
Pedigree of Declaration of War, bay stallion, 2009
Sire War Front (USA) 2002	Danzig (USA); 1977	Northern Dancer	Nearctic
Sire War Front (USA) 2002	Danzig (USA); 1977	Northern Dancer	Natalma
Sire War Front (USA) 2002	Danzig (USA); 1977	Pas de Nom	Admiral's Voyage
Sire War Front (USA) 2002	Danzig (USA); 1977	Pas de Nom	Petitioner
Sire War Front (USA) 2002	Starry Dreamer (USA); 1994	Rubiano	Fappiano
Sire War Front (USA) 2002	Starry Dreamer (USA); 1994	Rubiano	Ruby Slippers
Sire War Front (USA) 2002	Starry Dreamer (USA); 1994	Lara's Star	Forli
Sire War Front (USA) 2002	Starry Dreamer (USA); 1994	Lara's Star	True Reality
Dam Tempo West (USA) 1999	Rahy (USA); 1985	Blushing Groom	Red God
Dam Tempo West (USA) 1999	Rahy (USA); 1985	Blushing Groom	Runaway Bride
Dam Tempo West (USA) 1999	Rahy (USA); 1985	Glorious Song	Halo
Dam Tempo West (USA) 1999	Rahy (USA); 1985	Glorious Song	Ballade
Dam Tempo West (USA) 1999	Tempo (USA); 1992	Gone West	Mr. Prospector
Dam Tempo West (USA) 1999	Tempo (USA); 1992	Gone West	Secrettame
Dam Tempo West (USA) 1999	Tempo (USA); 1992	Terpsichorist	Nijinsky
Dam Tempo West (USA) 1999	Tempo (USA); 1992	Terpsichorist	Glad Rags (Family: 13-b)
