= Fappiano =

20th-century American Thoroughbred racehorse

- Sire: Mr. Prospector
- Grandsire: Raise a Native
- Dam: Killaloe
- Damsire: Dr. Fager
- Sex: Stallion
- Foaled: May 19, 1977
- Country: United States
- Colour: Bay
- Breeder: John A. Nerud
- Owner: John A. Nerud
- Trainer: Jan H. Nerud
- Record: 17: 10–3–1
- Earnings: US$370,213

Major wins
- Morven Stakes (1979); Discovery Handicap (1980); Metropolitan Handicap (1981); Forego Handicap (1981)

Fappiano (May 19, 1977 – September 3, 1990) was an American Thoroughbred racehorse whose most important win was the 1981 Metropolitan Handicap. When retired to stud, he became a major sire whose offspring included Kentucky Derby winner Unbridled. He was named for Joseph C. Nichols (1905–1984), a long-time sportswriter for The New York Times, who was born Giuseppe Carmine Fappiano.

== Background ==
Fappiano was bred and raced by U.S. Racing Hall of Fame trainer John Nerud and trained by his son, Jan. Bred in Florida, he was from one of the first crops of Mr. Prospector, then based in Florida, and helped establish Mr. Prospector's reputation as one of North America's leading sires. Fappiano was out Killaloe, an allowance race-winning daughter of Hall of Fame inductee Dr. Fager. Killaloe also produced stakes winners Torrential (FR-G1), Portroe (US-G3), Jedina and Royal Troon. Nerud had also bred Dr. Fager and Fappiano's second dam, Grand Splendor, while managing Tartan Farms. The family traces to the highly influential broodmare, Plucky Liege.

== Racing career ==
At age two in 1979, Fappiano went undefeated in four starts. Among those wins was the Morven Stakes with future Hall of Fame jockey Angel Cordero Jr. aboard. Run on December 20, cold weather had frozen the track but in spite of the conditions Fappiano broke the Meadowlands track record for six furlongs with a time of 1:08 3/5. t. He went on to win several important races through 1980 and 1981, including the Grade I Metropolitan Handicap.

== At stud ==
While successful in racing, Fappiano is best known as a sire and a sire of sires. At the end of 1981, he was retired and syndicated for a reported $300,000 per share. He stood at stud at Tartan Farms near Ocala, Florida, where he remained until the summer of 1987. He was then moved to Lane's End Farm in Versailles, Kentucky. Though himself a sprinter, he became known as a source of class (the ability to carry speed over distance). He was designated an Intermediate/Classic chef-de-race.

Fappiano was the grandsire of two different horses that combined to win all three U.S. Triple Crown races in the same year when Real Quiet won the 1998 Kentucky Derby and Preakness Stakes, and Victory Gallop won the 1998 Belmont Stakes. Through Unbridled, Fappiano is the great-great-grandsire of 2015 Triple Crown winner American Pharoah.

In early September 1990, Fappiano was humanely euthanized when laminitis set in while he was recovering from a fractured leg.

Fappiano notably sired:

- Tasso (b. 1983) – won 1985 Breeders' Cup Juvenile, voted American Champion Two-Year-Old Colt;
- Cryptoclearance (b. 1984) – multiple Grade 1 stakes winner with career earnings of US$3,376,327, sired Victory Gallop, Volponi;
- Tappiano (b. 1984) – won Spinaway Stakes, Demoiselle Stakes, Matron Stakes, career earnings of US$1,305,522;
- Aptostar (b. 1985) - won Grade 1 Acorn Stakes.
- Quiet American (b. 1986) – won NYRA Mile Handicap, sire of Real Quiet;
- Some Romance (b. 1986) – won Frizette Stakes, Matron Stakes;
- Defensive Play (b. 1987) – won Sandown Classic Trial and Rose of Lancaster Stakes in U.K. and Man o' War Stakes, Strub Stakes in U.S., career earnings of US$1,695,557;
- Grand Canyon (b. 1987) – won Hollywood Futurity, Norfolk Stakes, career earnings of $1,019,540;
- Rubiano (b. 1987) – multiple stakes winner with career earnings US$1,203,457, voted American Champion Sprint Horse in 1992;
- Unbridled (b. 1987) – won 1990 Kentucky Derby and Breeders' Cup Classic, voted American Champion Three-Year-Old Male Horse, career earnings of US$4,489,475. sire of Empire Maker, Grindstone, Halfbridled, and Unbridled's Song;
- Serape (b. 1988) - won Grade 1 Ballerina Handicap
- Cahill Road (b. 1988) – won Wood Memorial Stakes.
- Hum Along (b. 1989) Dam of Storm Song American Champion Two-Year-Old Filly
- Comet Shine (b. 1991) won Summer Stakes and Cup and Saucer Stakes. Champion at 2 in Can.

== Pedigree ==
Pedigree of Fappiano, bay horse, May 19, 1977
Sire Mr. Prospector 1970	Raise a Native	Native Dancer	Polynesian
Sire Mr. Prospector 1970	Raise a Native	Native Dancer	Geisha
Sire Mr. Prospector 1970	Raise a Native	Raise You	Case Ace
Sire Mr. Prospector 1970	Raise a Native	Raise You	Lady Glory
Sire Mr. Prospector 1970	Gold Digger	Nashua	Nasrullah
Sire Mr. Prospector 1970	Gold Digger	Nashua	Segula
Sire Mr. Prospector 1970	Gold Digger	Sequence	Count Fleet
Sire Mr. Prospector 1970	Gold Digger	Sequence	Miss Dogwood
Dam Killaloe 1970	Dr. Fager	Rough'n Tumble	Free For All
Dam Killaloe 1970	Dr. Fager	Rough'n Tumble	Roused
Dam Killaloe 1970	Dr. Fager	Aspidistra	Better Self
Dam Killaloe 1970	Dr. Fager	Aspidistra	Tilly Rose
Dam Killaloe 1970	Grand Splendor	Correlation	Free America
Dam Killaloe 1970	Grand Splendor	Correlation	Braydore
Dam Killaloe 1970	Grand Splendor	Cequillo	Princequillo
Dam Killaloe 1970	Grand Splendor	Cequillo	Boldness (family 16-a)
